= 2008 Oregon Ballot Measure 59 =

Measure 59
- Creates an unlimited deduction for federal income taxes on individual taxpayers' Oregon income-tax returns.

Results
Choice	Votes	%
Yes	615,894	36.22%
No	1,084,422	63.78%
Total votes	1,700,316	100.00%
Registered voters/turnout		85.7%
- Results by county No 50%-60% 60%-70% 70%-80%

Oregon Ballot Measure 59 was an initiated state statute ballot measure sponsored by Bill Sizemore that appeared on the November 4, 2008 general election ballot in Oregon, United States. If it had passed, Oregon would have join Alabama, Iowa, and Louisiana as the only states to allow federal income taxes to be fully deducted on state income tax returns.

== Background ==
=== Official Ballot Title ===
The official ballot title is: Creates an unlimited deduction for federal income taxes on individual taxpayers' Oregon income-tax returns.

=== History ===
This is the third time Sizemore has put a similar measure on the ballot. In 2000, he qualified Measure 91, which would have made federal income taxes fully deductible on state taxes. It lost 55–45, but a legislative referral that increased limited state deductions of federal taxes passed. In 2007, the limit on federal deductions was $5,600 — it increases each year indexed to inflation.

In 2006, Sizemore associate Russ Walker introduced Measure 41, which would have allowed "income tax deduction equal to federal exemptions deduction to substitute for state exemption credit." It failed 63–37.

Along with Measures 60 and 64, Measure 59 is one of the three initiatives on the 2008 ballot that Sizemore has brought to the ballot in the past.

== Newspaper Endorsements ==
Here is how Oregon's major newspapers have endorsed on Measure 59:

Newspapers	Yes	No
The Oregonian		No
Medford Mail-Tribune		No
Statesman Journal		No
Bend Bulletin		No
Portland Tribune		No
Eugene Register-Guard		No
Daily Astorian		No
East Oregonian		No
Corvallis Gazette Times		No
Coos Bay The World		No
Willamette Week		No
Yamhill Valley News Register		No
Gresham Outlook		No
Hillsboro Argus		No

No Oregon newspapers have endorsed a yes vote on Measure 59.

== Specific provisions of the initiative ==
The ballot title is "An Act to Prohibit Double Taxation". Specific provisions include:

- Adding Section 1 to the Oregon Revised Statutes. Prohibition on Double Taxation. Whereas it is unjust for one government to impose an income tax on money a taxpayer has been required to pay to another government as an income tax; therefore, for tax years beginning on or after January 1, 2010, no Oregon taxpayer shall be required to pay to the state, a local government, or other taxing district, an income tax of any kind on money paid to the federal government as federal income taxes. All money paid to the federal government to satisfy, wholly or in part, a taxpayer's federal income tax obligation for tax years beginning on or after January 1, 2010 shall be fully deductible against income on the taxpayer's Oregon income tax return. This section applies only to (i) federal income taxes paid on income subject to tax in Oregon, and (ii) federal income taxes, including capital gains taxes, paid by individuals. This section does not apply to corporate income taxes or corporate excise taxes.
- Adding Section 2 to the Oregon Revised Statutes. This 2008 Act supersedes any existing law or rule with which it conflicts. If any phrase, clause or part of this 2008 Act is determined to be invalid by a court of competent jurisdiction, the remaining phrases, clauses, and parts shall remain in full force and effect.

=== Estimated fiscal impact ===
The state's Financial Estimate Committee prepares estimated fiscal impact statements for any ballot measures that will appear on the ballot. The estimate prepared by this committee for Measure 58 says:

- Measure 59 would benefit about a quarter of Oregon taxpayers.
- It would lower state revenues by $1.3 billion in the 2009-2011 biennium and $2.4 billion in the 2011-2013 biennium.
- The state budget would have to make up those reduced revenues in its general fund which pays for education, health care for children, the elderly, and the disabled, and public safety.

=== Other fiscal estimates ===
The Oregon Center for Public Policy (OCPP) issued a separate financial impact study. Features of their report:

- OCPP says the overall cost would be $1.1 billion rather than the $1.3 billion estimate provided by the government.
- 22 percent of Oregon's taxpayers would see a savings from Measure 59.
- Households with annual incomes exceeding $82,200 would receive 97% of the savings under the plan.

== Proponents ==
Bill Sizemore, Timothy R. Trickey and R. Russell Walker are the measure's chief petitioners.

The committee that put Measure 59 on the ballot was called "Stop the Double Tax". There is no committee currently supporting the ballot measure.

=== Arguments Supporting Measure 59 ===
- This measure would save taxpayers over $1.3 billion over the next two years.
- Tax cuts allow families and business to keep more of their own money, which reduces the need for government program spending.

=== Donors supporting Measure 59 ===
The Oregonian reported in September 2007 that Nevada millionaire Loren Parks was the leading contributor to the effort to put Measure 59 and other measures on the ballot. According to the newspaper, Parks gave money directly to the signature gathering firm, rather than to Sizemore directly. A court injunction stemming from a 2000 fraud case prevents Sizemore from spending money directly on politics, although he told Oregon Public Broadcasting in May 2008 that he "found a way to put the measures on the ballot and give voters those choices without me actually handling the money. And so I'm still able to put measures on the ballot, I just have to do it in a sort of round-about way."

== Opponents ==
Measure 59 is opposed by the Defend Oregon, which includes the American Heart Association, 1000 Friends of Oregon, AARP Oregon, Children First for Oregon, and others.

=== Arguments against Measure 59 ===
Notable arguments that have been made against Measure 59 include:

- "There are many good wealthy folks who will not suffer with the failure of Measure 59. Society as a whole, however, will suffer mightily if it passes", said Gary Stutzman of the Hillsboro Argus.
- Because the measure would reduce overall tax revenues for the state, it would reduce the amount of money available for the state's most vulnerable populations, who rely on government programs for various types of assistance.
- For the same reason, state spending on public safety programs would likely have to be reduced.
- The $1.1 billion (or $1.3 billion) cost estimate is equivalent to the total funding that Oregon's public universities will receive from the state in the current biennium or to cutting the salaries of all Oregon K-12 public school teachers by 70 percent.
- In addition to not benefiting a majority of taxpayers, Measure 59 actually increases taxes on about 120,000 people, mostly retirees, according to the Oregon Center for Public Policy.

=== Donors opposing Measure 59 ===
Defend Oregon, as a committee, is fighting seven different ballot measures, and supporting two others. As a result, it is not possible to discern how much of its campaign spending is going specifically to defeat Measure 58. Altogether, the group has raised $9 million in 2008.

Major donations to the Defend Oregon group as of October 23 include:

- $5.2 million from the Oregon Education Association.,
- $1.2 million from SEIU.
- $450,000, American Federation of Teachers
- $600,000, AFSCME.
- $100,000 from School Employees Exercising Democracy (SEED)
- $100,000 from the AFL-CIO.
- $50,000 from Oregon AFSCME Council 75.

== Petition drive history ==
The office of the Oregon Secretary of State announced on June 16, 2008 that its unofficial signature verification process showed that the initiative's supporters had turned in 83,136 valid signatures, versus a requirement of 82,769 signatures. This represented a validity rate of 64.76% calculated over the 128,380 signatures turned in. The measure formally qualified for the ballot on August 2.,

A union-funded watchdog group asked the Oregon Secretary of State to conduct an investigation into how some of the signatures on the measure were collected. Bill Bradbury, the Secretary of State has said, ""...most all of the initiatives Oregon voters will decide this fall got there through practices that are now illegal. But those practices were legal at the time most of the signatures were submitted." The state's Election Division is investigating the charges.
