= Hector Macpherson Jr. =

American politician (1918–2015)

Member of the Oregon Senate from the 8th district
- In office 1971–1974
- Preceded by: Glenn Huston
- Succeeded by: John Powell
- Constituency: Linn County

Personal details
- Born: September 18, 1918 Corvallis, Oregon
- Died: March 21, 2015 (aged 96) Corvallis, Oregon
- Party: Republican
- Spouse: Katharine "Kitty" Macpherson
- Education: Oregon State Agricultural College
- Profession: Dairy farmer

Hector "Huck" Macpherson Jr. (September 18, 1918 – March 21, 2015) was an American dairy farmer and politician in the state of Oregon. Macpherson was a member of the Oregon State Senate from 1971 to 1974 and is best remembered as a primary author of the seminal 1973 Land Conservation and Development Act (SB 100) which established the Oregon Land Conservation and Development Commission and statewide land use planning regulation.

As the navigator aboard a B-17 Flying Fortress during World War II, Macpherson flew 50 combat missions and was the recipient of the Distinguished Flying Cross and the Bronze Star Medal for his service, leaving the United States Army Air Corps in 1945 with the rank of Major. Following the war Macpherson took over the family dairy farm and became involved with the politics of land use planning over concerns with encroaching urban development of farmland.

Macpherson was the son of former Oregon state representative Hector Macpherson Sr. and the father of former Oregon state representative Greg Macpherson.

== Biography ==
=== Early years ===
The Oregon-born Hector Macpherson Jr. was the youngest of three siblings.

Hector Macpherson Jr., known to family and personal friends from his earliest years by the nickname "Huck," was born September 19, 1918, in Corvallis, Oregon. He was the third of three children of the Canadian-born Hector Macpherson Sr., a professor of agricultural economics at Oregon Agricultural College (today known as Oregon State University) and his Chicago-born wife, the former Margaret Buchanan Dupee. His father, an academic expert on the cooperative movement, resigned his academic position in 1926 to dedicate his time to politics. His father was elected in 1926, 1928, and 1938 as a progressive Republican member the Oregon Legislative Assembly and was instrumental in a controversial high-profile initiative campaign for education reform in Oregon.

The Macpherson family lived on a small dairy farm several miles outside of Corvallis and Huck and his siblings were responsible for performance of farm tasks from an early age. Although nominally Presbyterian, the family was skeptical towards Biblical literalism and both parents were believers in the doctrine of evolution.

Elementary school was attended in the small rural school at Oakville, Oregon, from which Macpherson graduated 8th grade in May 1932 — a member of a graduating class of seven students. Macpherson's youthful academic history was unremarkable, and he was neither the valedictorian or salutatorian in his tiny graduating class.

In 1936, Macpherson graduated from Corvallis High School and enrolled in Oregon State Agricultural College (from 1937 Oregon State College, today's OSU). He began his collegiate career in the sciences but switched majors to the OSC's School of Agriculture after two years of study, graduating with a Bachelor's degree in 1940. He was a member of the U.S. Army's Reserve Officers' Training Corps throughout his collegiate years, initially training for potential assignment in the infantry.

=== Military years ===
Capt. Hector Macpherson Jr. receiving the Distinguished Flying Cross from Maj. Gen. Nathan Farragut Twining, summer 1944

Following graduation, Macpherson applied for a teaching fellowship at Washington State College in Pullman, Washington. American entry into World War II, which had erupted the previous autumn, was clearly on the horizon, however. Rather than face the prospect of entry into the conflict as a 2nd Lieutenant of the infantry, Macpherson instead chose to enlist in the Army Air Corps. He trained as a pilot at the new Vandenberg Air Force Base in Santa Maria, California, but was scrubbed from the pilot program following a rough landing during training. He was instead stationed as a 2nd Lieutenant of the Army Air Corps at Albrook Field, located near Panama City, Panama, where he was placed in charge of the base photo laboratory.

In 1943, now a 1st Lieutenant, Macpherson was enrolled in Navigation School at Selman Field in Monroe, Louisiana, where he was trained as a navigator for high-altitude bombers. Prior to assignment abroad he took time to get married in May 1943 to Katharine Brownell Smith of New York, whom he had met in 1941 and corresponded with for two years. His military training would be completed during the summer of 1943 and he was dispatched to Casablanca in Northern Africa aboard a so-called Liberty Ship. There he was assigned to the 416 squadron of the 99th Bombardment Group, for which he began flying missions from Tunis late in October 1943.

In December 1943 Macpherson and the rest of his crew were transferred to Italy, from which they continued to fly frequent bombing missions aboard a B-17 Flying Fortress. He was one of a group of a dozen navigators selected for training in H2X radar, a new form of radar navigation system developed by the British Royal Air Force, and returned stateside for instruction to Boca Raton, Florida, in January 1944. Training was completed in the middle of March 1944 and Macpherson was again transported to Northern Africa, where he became a member of a 7-man crew aboard a B-17.

By early August 1944 Macpherson had recorded his 50th mission as a bomber flight navigator, ending his stint in that capacity. Promoted to the rank of Captain later that month, Macpherson was awarded the Distinguished Flying Cross for his service.

Macpherson was then assigned to desk duty at Air Force Headquarters in Bari, Italy. There he was assigned the task of writing a manual on the use and combat applications of HX2 "Pathfinder" radar, which he completed along with two other experienced navigators. He also helped to launch a training school for radar navigators and assisted with mission planning. Macpherson would receive a Bronze Star for his work helping to expand the use of the Pathfinder radar navigation program, a technology which proved itself vital to successful operations against enemy oil refineries.

A final promotion to the rank of Major followed, just in time for his return to the United States in May 1945, just one day ahead of V-E Day.

=== Post-war career ===
Following his discharge from the military, Macpherson returned to Oregon where his father, Hector Macpherson Sr., operated a dairy farm in rural Linn County, Oregon. The idea of farming held an appeal to the returning flight navigator and father and son entered into a business partnership in the fall of 1945. Funds accumulated during the war years were plowed into the business. At the end of a pre-arranged one-year partnership, his father sold son Huck the 180-acre homestead for a modest sum. A growing family and farm consumed the next quarter century, with the farm expanded and modernized during the second half of the 1950s.

In addition to life on the farm, Macpherson pursued outside interests, including activity in the local Community Club and telephone cooperative. He was instrumental in the establishment of the Linn-Benton Dairy Breeders and Corvallis Milk Producers organizations, and was elected president of each. These activities made the dairy farmer aware of broader political and economic issues impacting farmers of the region and helped Macpherson hone his public speaking skills.

In 1962 Macpherson first became involved in land use planning after the national farm press began publishing articles on the topic. Around the country residential housing was beginning to encroach upon established farm land, driving up land values and making agricultural production uneconomic. In California an alternative had been conceived in the form of special farm zones, which would protect farmers from this escalating problem. Macpherson could foresee a similar situation developing in his own area and was interested by the idea, which he was able to promote through his chairmanship of an advisory committee to the Oregon State University Extension Service.

Aided by a favorable resolution of the Linn County Chamber of Commerce, Macpherson was able to help orchestrate a hearing on land use planning before the Linn County Commission, the elected county government authority for rural Linn County. The hearing, at which positive testimony was heard from a broad range of community figures including the head of the Linn Chamber of Commerce, led to an initial appropriation of $5,000 towards the development of a first building code for the county. A county planning commission was established, with Macpherson recruited as chairman, and in 1967 the first land use zoning hearings for Linn County were held. Macpherson would remain active in the Linn County planning commission's affairs, acutely aware of the rapidly changing land-use planning landscape in Oregon.

=== Land use planning in Oregon ===
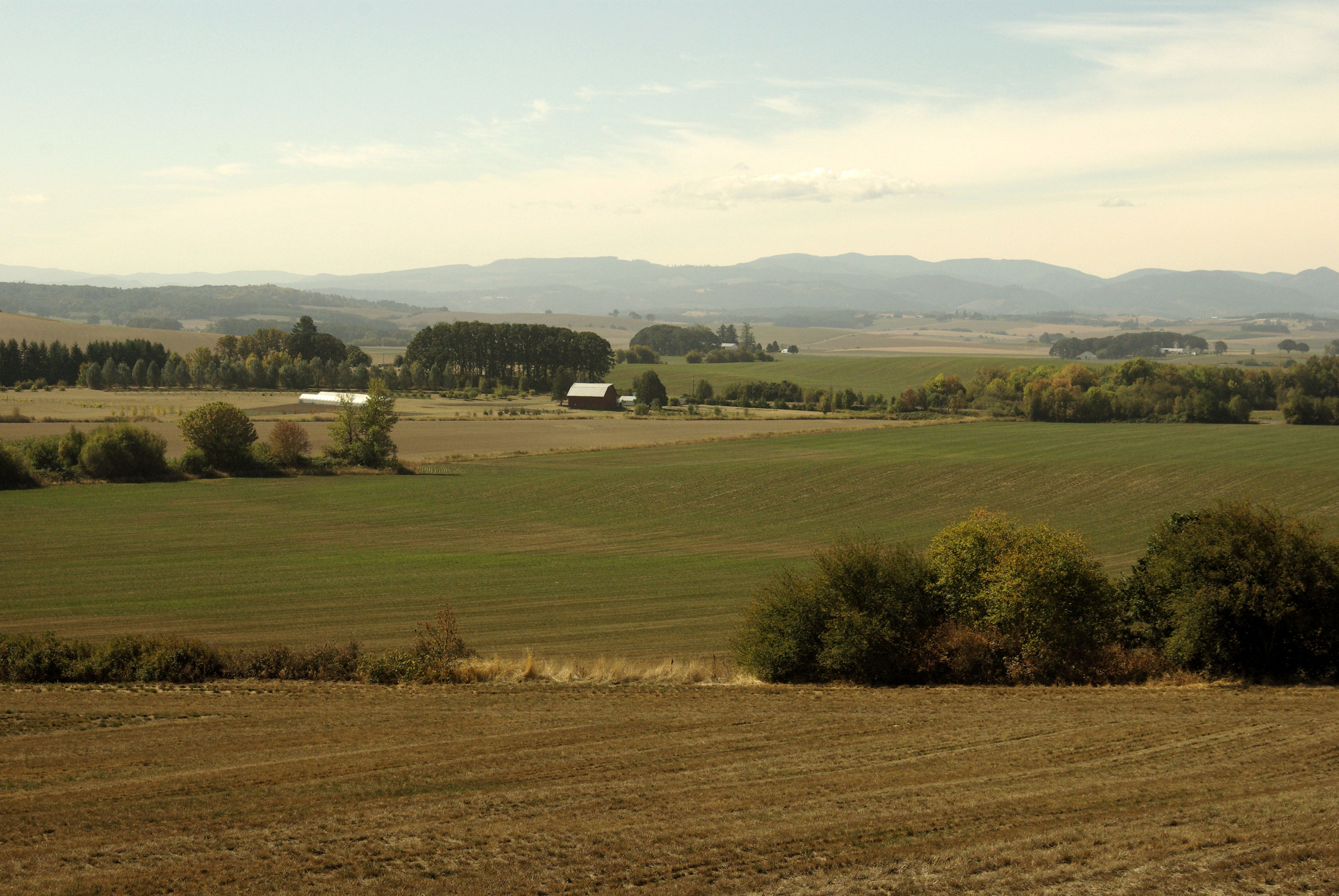
View of a rural section the Willamette Valley in Oregon's Polk County. Rapid population growth and haphazard county development regulations placed prime farmland in danger of destruction prior to the institution of statewide land-use planning in 1973.

During the decade of the 1960s, the population of Oregon grew by approximately 18%, with the vast majority of this expansion taking place in the nine counties of the Willamette Valley in the northwestern section of the state. This rate of growth would increase in the subsequent decade, with Oregon's population expanding by another 26% during the 1970s. This substantial expansion of the population base increased pressure on the state's finite land supply, which impacted land values as residential and agricultural users came into competition.

A hodge-podge of local land use regulations had emerged during the 1940s and 1950s when county governments were first empowered to zone land for specific uses. Most county governments showed little appetite for land-use planning, however, with sprawling suburban development which dissected prime farmland an all too frequent result of the lack of centralized oversight.

In 1969 the Oregon Legislature passed initial legislature attempting to increase the level of state oversight of the land-use planning process. The law, remembered as Senate Bill 10 (SB 10), mandated that every city and county government in the state to adopt a comprehensive land-use plan and to establish "border-to-border" zoning of its jurisdiction by the end of 1971. SB 10 originated in the powerful Senate Agriculture Committee with farmland preservation in clear view and was firmly supported by Tom McCall, the state's progressive Republican governor, for whom environmental and livability issues were matters of primary importance. The passage of this legislation made Oregon the first state in the union to universally require local zoning ordinances and the second to mandate comprehensive planning.

SB 10 was controversial. The law was challenged by planning opponents with a ballot initiative in 1970, which was defeated. Despite the law being upheld by the voters, the lack of state financial support for the law's planning mandates and entrenched resistance in certain counties undermined the effect of the law. By the end of 1971, the deadline set by the law, fewer than one-third of Oregon's counties and just over 40% of the state's cities had adopted the comprehensive plans and "border-to-border" zoning ordinances required by law. Unable to cope with non-compliance on such a massive scale, the Governor's office — which was to take over the task of planning and zoning in the event of failure by lower governmental authorities — was forced to grant extensions en masse. Oregon's land-use planning system remained incomplete and in need of more powerful central authority.

=== Oregon State Senator ===
In 1970 the 52-year-old Macpherson decided to make his first run for elected political office, moved by a lifelong interest in public policy and his father's political example. Himself a progressive Republican, Macpherson was unwilling and unable to challenge the incumbent Republican state representative in his district, but saw a potential opening in the race for Oregon State Senate for a seat held by two-term conservative Democrat Glenn Huston of Lebanon. Macpherson emerged victorious over a single opponent in the May Republican primary election and then set his sights on the November general election, studying his opponent's voting history exhaustively until, as Macpherson later recalled, "I knew his public record better than he did."

After a bitter campaign during which he spent between $5,000 and $6,000, Macpherson managed to unseat the incumbent by a bare 200 votes. The Republican Macpherson's election had the effect of splitting the 30-member State Senate exactly down the middle in terms of party representation, 15-15. A two-week fight for the position of Senate President — and the inevitable repercussions it would have over committee assignments — ensued before Republicans finally acquiesced to the election of Condon Democrat John Burns and a split of committee chairs. The election of Burns was not the result of negotiated compromise, however, but rather was the result of a deal made behind the scenes in which Burns crossed party lines to vote for himself without consultation with the Democratic caucus. The situation was tense and bitter.

As part of the political imbroglio following the 1970 election, Senate Democrats moved to investigate charges levied by defeated Senator Huston against Macpherson, alleging fraudulent misrepresentation of his positions during the recently completed campaign. Although an attorney was retained by Macpherson to defend himself against this charge, a political settlement was negotiated behind the scenes in which Macpherson was seated but publicly censured for having made campaign misstatements. "This let the brouhaha fade quickly from public view, and [it] was barely mentioned in the next election cycle," Macpherson later recalled.

Macpherson was made a member of three Senate committees — Agriculture, Environment, and Consumer Affairs. As a member of the Environment Committee Macpherson attempted to navigate a centrist course between those seeking to eliminate and those seeking to preserve agricultural field burning. Macpherson helped scuttle an effort to speedily phase out the contentious practice but was instrumental in adding a per acre fee to fund research of burning alternatives to legislation establishing a permit system for the regulation of field burning.

As a member of the 5-member Consumer Affairs Committee, Macpherson found himself the swing vote in support of the landmark Oregon Bottle Bill, which established a 5-cent deposit on containers for beer and carbonated drinks. He also broke ranks with Senate Republican leader Vic Atiyeh and helped to pass the Oregon Bicycle Bill, which mandated the expenditure of a minimum of 1% of funds each fiscal year by the Oregon Department of Transportation for the construction of bicycle paths.

=== Land Conservation and Development Act of 1973 ===
Macpherson's signature legislative achievement would come in the 1973 biennial session of the Oregon Legislature with the passage of the Land Conservation and Development Act, Senate Bill 100. Already in the summer of 1971 Macpherson was driven by an interest in expanding and solidifying state land use planning regulations and he sought the establishment of an official legislative body called an "interim committee" to develop a new round of legislation on the topic. Senate President John Burns declined to fulfill an earlier verbal commitment to establish such a body, however, and in November Macpherson angrily broke with the Senate leader to establish a non-governmental committee of his own creation for this purpose.

Macpherson worked closely with Bob Logan, a top staffer in the office of Governor Tom McCall, to construct a pair of work-groups called the Land Use Policy Committee and the Rural Planning and Conservation Committee, to bring together urban and rural advocates of land use planning. The former group would work to create a central administrative body to coordinate and regulate land use planning on a statewide basis; the latter would study the specific question of farmland preservation and the regulation of construction of subdivisions. Participants included representatives of city and county governments, the Oregon Farm Bureau Federation, Associated Oregon Industries, the Oregon Environmental Council, and the Oregon Student Public Interest and Research Group.

These committees launched their work with a kickoff meeting in Salem in January 1972. The only state support of this committee work was the use of a room at the Oregon State Capitol — no reimbursement was made for travel or other expenses, as was customary for official interim committees of the Oregon Legislature. Macpherson was the only legislator to participate in the work of this committee.

By the summer of 1972 the informal Macpherson committee had generated the first draft of proposed legislation of what would become Senate Bill 100.

According to Henry Richmond, former director of the land use watchdog group 1000 Friends of Oregon, rather than liberal anti-growth activists it was Hector Macpherson and a "small group of conservative Republican farmer-legislators" who proved decisive in the battle for the passage of Senate Bill 100:

The one who got it started was Hector Macpherson, a dairy farmer who was a member of the Linn County Planning Commission for many years. County planning commissions might try to preserve farmland, but state laws were so weak back then that the commissions were really powerless whenever developers waived enough money around in front of hard-pressed farmers ... But Hector saw that the farming economy — and a whole way of life — was being paved over by urban sprawl year after year. * * * ... At every critical legislative juncture there was a conservative Republican farmer-legislator in the middle of the reform battle. Hector Macpherson, of course. Jim Smart and Randy Smith from Polk County, Stafford Hansell from Umatilla County. Salt-of-the-earth types with real dirt under their fingernails. At legislative hearings they spoke with the moral authority of Old Testament prophets. They're the ones who really put Oregon's land use law on the books.

Poignant testimony and persuasive speaking is not what passes legislation, however; political compromise, arm-twisting, and parliamentary creativity are what is necessary to get a bill signed into law. The Senate Environmental and Land Use Committee, of which Macpherson was a member but not the chair, stood as an obstacle to passage, with only a minority of 3 of its 7 members supportive of SB 100. All efforts to clear compromise legislation through the committee failed. An end run was made around the legislative logjam through the establishment of a new ad hoc committee chaired by former legislator L. B. Day, which attempted to "breathe life into a dead bill," as Day phrased it.

Backed with the strong support of popular Governor Tom McCall, Day's interim committee negotiated a set of compromises which somewhat weakened central authority and made passage of SB 100 possible. The elimination of the ability of the proposed Land Use and Development Commission to require permits for development within "areas of critical state concern" proved decisive in the construction of passable legislation.

The political divide over SB 100 was not partisan so much as it was regional, as members of both the Republican and Democratic parties fell on each side of the issue. Within the populous Willamette Valley, support for the measure was high, with legislators voting by a margin of 5-to-1 in favor of the bill. Outside of the 9 valley counties, conservative legislators opposed passage of SB 100 by a ratio of more than 2-to-1. The populous valley's representation proved decisive, however, and on May 29, 1973, Governor McCall signed the bill into law.

=== Electoral defeat ===
Macpherson declared his candidacy for reelection in 1974 and would find himself facing a young and well-spoken high school teacher named John Powell in the November election. The year was not a good one for Republicans, with the election coming on the heels of the resignation of President Richard M. Nixon in connection with the Watergate scandal. Moreover, the centrist Macpherson's prominent work on the issue of land-use planning, anathema to many conservative rural voters, undermined his potential base of support, enabling his more liberal Democratic challenger to defeat him at the polls.

=== Death and legacy ===
Hector Macpherson Jr. died March 21, 2015, in Corvallis, Oregon. He was 96 years old at the time of his death.

Prior to assignment abroad in May 1943 Macpherson married Katharine "Kitty" Smith (1921–2016), with whom he would have five children – two daughters and three sons. One of the boys, Greg Macpherson, would follow in the footsteps of his grandfather and father as an elected member of the Oregon Legislature, in which he served from 2003 to 2009.

At his public funeral, held April 9, 2015, Macpherson was eulogized by Henry Richmond, longtime executive director of state land use watchdog group 1000 Friends of Oregon. He was also remembered as an energetic and enthusiastic hiker and mountaineer who had in his lifetime climbed nearly all the peaks of the Cascade Mountain Range from Mount Rainier in Washington to Mount Shasta in California. His ashes were interred at Oakville Cemetery in Shedd, Oregon.

== See also ==
- Land use in Oregon

== Works ==
- Hector Macpherson, Jr. with Katharine Smith Macpherson, The Macpherson Family Through Four Generations. n.c. [Corvallis, OR]: Janet Macpherson Wershow, 2010.
