= Neighborhood Preservation Committee (Oregon) =

The Neighborhood Preservation Committee is a political action committee in Portland, Oregon, United States. It was founded by Kate Scheile, a 2002 candidate for President of Metro (Oregon regional government). The Oregon Secretary of State's web site lists two committees with identical names; their committee numbers are 5043 and 5148.

Neighborhood Preservation Committee published an argument in support of Oregon Ballot Measure 2 (2000), opposing urban density.

NPC supported Oregon Ballot Measure 37 (2004), though its financial contributions to the campaign were negligible.

NPC financed Initiative Petition Drive 57 in 2006, which placed Oregon Ballot Measure 39 (2006) on the ballot.

In the first half of 2006, NPC contributed $55,000 to Oregonians In Action, a political action committee that is known for having passed Measure 37 in 2004, as well as supporting Measure 39 and Republican candidates for the Oregon Legislative Assembly in 2006.
