= Proposition 2 =

Proposition 2 may refer to:

- 2005 Texas Proposition 2
- 2006 Idaho Proposition 2
- 2008 California Proposition 2
- 2018 Idaho Proposition 2
