= Oregon Ballot Measure 60 =

Oregon Ballot Measure 60 may refer to:

- 1998 Oregon Ballot Measure 60, measure that made Oregon the first state in the United States to conduct its elections exclusively by mail
- 2008 Oregon Ballot Measure 60, measure to create a new Oregon state statute mandating that only undefined "classroom performance" would determine teachers' pay raises
