= 2008 Oregon Ballot Measure 60 =

Measure 60
- Teacher "classroom performance", not seniority, determines pay raises; "most qualified" teachers retained, regardless of seniority.

Results
| Choice | Votes | % |
|---|---|---|
| Yes | 673,296 | 38.61% |
| No | 1,070,682 | 61.39% |
| Total votes | 1,743,978 | 100.00% |
| Registered voters/turnout | | 85.7% |
- Results by county Yes 50%-60% No 50%-60% 60%-70% 70%-80%

Oregon Ballot Measure 60 was an initiated state statute ballot measure filed by Bill Sizemore and R. Russell Walker. Sizemore referred to it the "Kids First Act." The measure appeared on the November 4, 2008 general election ballot in Oregon.

The goal of the initiative was to create a new Oregon state statute mandating that only "classroom performance" — not seniority, additional duties, qualifications, advanced degrees, or additional training — would determine teachers' pay raises. It would also mandate that the "most qualified" teachers be retained under employment, replacing seniority as a major consideration. "Classroom performance" and "most qualified" are not defined by the measure.

This is the second time Sizemore has placed a similar measure on the ballot. Measure 95 in 2000 was defeated 65–35. Likewise, Oregon voters rejected Measure 60 by 61.39% to 38.61%, with rejection coming from all but five counties.

The official ballot title for Measure 60 was: Teacher "classroom performance", not seniority, determines pay raises; "most qualified" teachers retained, regardless of seniority.

Vote tallies by county:

| County | No | Votes | Yes | Votes | Total |
|---|---|---|---|---|---|
| Baker | 51.88 | 4,391 | 48.12 | 4,073 | 8,464 |
| Benton | 68.33 | 30,237 | 31.67 | 14,016 | 44,253 |
| Clackamas | 59.11 | 108,232 | 40.89 | 74,881 | 183,113 |
| Clatsop | 60.55 | 10,755 | 39.45 | 7,006 | 17,761 |
| Columbia | 58.24 | 13,916 | 41.76 | 9,978 | 23,894 |
| Coos | 55.58 | 16,703 | 44.42 | 13,348 | 30,051 |
| Crook | 49.08 | 4,925 | 50.92 | 5,110 | 10,035 |
| Curry | 52.13 | 6,169 | 47.87 | 5,665 | 11,834 |
| Deschutes | 55.68 | 42,248 | 44.32 | 33,629 | 75,877 |
| Douglas | 53.14 | 27,046 | 46.86 | 23,851 | 50,897 |
| Gilliam | 54.75 | 582 | 45.25 | 481 | 1,063 |
| Grant | 47.95 | 1,790 | 52.05 | 1,943 | 3,733 |
| Harney | 50.16 | 1,777 | 49.84 | 1,766 | 3,543 |
| Hood River | 63.23 | 5,920 | 36.77 | 3,442 | 9,362 |
| Jackson | 59.87 | 57,717 | 40.13 | 38,690 | 96,407 |
| Jefferson | 53.97 | 4,374 | 46.03 | 3,731 | 8,105 |
| Josephine | 54.78 | 21,969 | 45.22 | 18,135 | 40,104 |
| Klamath | 53.14 | 15,140 | 46.86 | 13,349 | 28,489 |
| Lake | 51.38 | 1,825 | 48.62 | 1,727 | 3,552 |
| Lane | 63.91 | 111,682 | 36.09 | 63,059 | 174,741 |
| Lincoln | 59.33 | 13,615 | 40.67 | 9,333 | 22,948 |
| Linn | 56.17 | 27,908 | 43.83 | 21,781 | 49,689 |
| Malheur | 44.14 | 4,436 | 55.86 | 5,613 | 10,049 |
| Marion | 58.83 | 70,601 | 41.17 | 49,399 | 120,000 |
| Morrow | 53.62 | 2,116 | 46.38 | 1,830 | 3,946 |
| Multnomah | 70.93 | 244,787 | 29.07 | 100,311 | 345,098 |
| Polk | 59.96 | 20,760 | 40.04 | 13,865 | 34,625 |
| Sherman | 52.45 | 525 | 47.55 | 476 | 1,001 |
| Tillamook | 58.27 | 7,444 | 41.73 | 5,331 | 12,775 |
| Umatilla | 51.50 | 12,626 | 48.50 | 11,892 | 24,518 |
| Union | 56.09 | 6,796 | 43.91 | 5,321 | 12,117 |
| Wallowa | 48.85 | 2,059 | 51.15 | 2,156 | 4,215 |
| Wasco | 60.26 | 6,556 | 39.74 | 4,324 | 10,880 |
| Washington | 61.80 | 138,512 | 38.20 | 85,613 | 224,125 |
| Wheeler | 49.11 | 386 | 50.89 | 400 | 786 |
| Yamhill | 57.62 | 24,157 | 42.38 | 17,771 | 41,928 |

== Newspaper Endorsements ==
Here is how Oregon's major newspapers have endorsed on the measure:

| Newspapers | Yes | No |
|---|---|---|
| The Oregonian | | No |
| The Portland Mercury | Yes | |
| Medford Mail-Tribune | | No |
| Statesman Journal | | No |
| Bend Bulletin | | No |
| Portland Tribune | | No |
| Eugene Register-Guard | | No |
| Daily Astorian | | No |
| East Oregonian | | No |
| Corvallis Gazette Times | | No |
| Coos Bay The World | | No |
| Willamette Week | | No |
| Yamhill Valley News Register | | No |
| Gresham Outlook | | No |
| Hillsboro Argus | | No |

== Specific provisions in the initiative ==
The language of the proposed statute is:

- Section 1. Teacher pay raises and job security shall be based on job performance. (a) After the effective date of this 2008 Act, pay raises for public school teachers shall be based upon each teacher's classroom performance and not related or connected to his or her seniority. If a school district reduces its teaching staff, the district shall retain the teachers who are most qualified to teach the specific subjects, which they will be assigned to teach. A determination as to which teacher is most qualified shall be based upon each teacher's past classroom experience successfully teaching the specific subject(s) or class, as well his or her as academic training in the relevant subject matter.
- (b) This 2008 Act shall be called the "Kids First Act" and shall supersede any previously existing law, rule, or policy with which it conflicts. This Act shall not be implemented in a manner so as to violate or impair the obligation of any contract in existence as of the effective date of this Act, but shall govern later extensions to those contracts and new contracts entered into after the effective date of this Act.

Note: "Classroom performance" and "most qualified" are not defined in the measure.

=== Estimated fiscal impact ===
The state's Financial Estimate Committee prepares estimated fiscal impact statements for any ballot measures that will appear on the ballot. The estimate prepared by this committee for Measure 60 says:

- Measure 60 would require between $30 and $72 million in additional state and local spending in the first year.
- After the first year, it would require between $30 and $60 million a year in additional state and local spending.

== Supporters ==
Preserve Our Best Teachers was the name of the committee sponsoring the original initiative. There is no committee filed to support the ballot measure.

The Oregonian reported in September 2007 that Nevada millionaire Loren Parks was the leading contributor to Measure 60.

Randall J. Pozdena, Ph.D., of the Cascade Policy Institute, authored a commentary that argued, "Absent serious structural reforms such as school-level competition, paying for performance in the classroom may be the best way to stimulate higher academic achievement among our K-12 public school students."

=== Arguments in favor of Measure 60 ===
- Good teachers should be rewarded.
- "While money may not be the only way to attract the teachers we need, it is a useful tool and one we can readily wield."
- What's more important to our kids' education: tenure or good teaching skills? (Oregon doesn't have tenure.)
- The proposal will "reward good teachers, weed out bad ones and improve the quality of the state's schools."

== Opposition ==
Measure 60 is opposed by the Parents and Teachers Know Better Coalition, which describes itself as "a broad coalition of parents, teachers, and school advocates who care about Oregon's students & schools." The Parents and Teachers Know Better campaign is part of the Defend Oregon Coalition, which opposes all five of the ballot initiatives on the 2008 ballot measures that are sponsored by Sizemore.

Members of the coalition include Stand for Children, Oregon PTA, United Way of the Mid-Willamette Valley, Oregon Education Association, American Federation of Teachers-Oregon, Oregon School Employees Association, and the Human Services Coalition of Oregon, among others.

=== Arguments against Measure 60 ===
Notable arguments made against Measure 60 include:

- Because none of the terms are defined in the measure, there is no way to know how teachers will actually be judged, or who will be doing the judging.
- It is "costly, ill-conceived, inflexible and potentially damaging to the children of Oregon...poorly written, vague and not based on best practices."
- It could lead to more standardized testing and cause low-income areas to lose teachers.

=== Donors opposing Measure 60 ===
Defend Oregon, as a committee, is fighting seven different ballot measures, and supporting two others. Altogether, the group has raised over $6 million in 2008.

Major donations to the Defend Oregon group as of October 8 include:

- $4.1 million from the Oregon Education Association.
- $100,000 from School Employees Exercising Democracy (SEED)
- $100,000 from the AFL-CIO.
- $50,000 from Oregon AFSCME Council 75.

== Petition drive history ==
Initiative Petition 20 was originally approved for circulation on August 30, 2006, and the signatures were turned in the month of July. 83,724 signatures were found to be valid of those submitted, versus a qualification threshold of 82,769.

A union-funded watchdog group asked the Oregon Secretary of State to conduct an investigation into how some of the signatures on the measure were collected. Bill Bradbury, the Secretary of State has said, "...most all of the initiatives Oregon voters will decide this fall got there through practices that are now illegal. But those practices were legal at the time most of the signatures were submitted." The state Elections Division is currently investigating the charges.
