= Bill Sizemore =

American activist (born 1951)

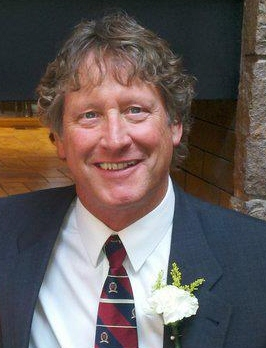

Personal details
- Born: June 2, 1951 (age 75) Aberdeen, Washington, U.S.
- Party: Republican
- Spouse: Cindy
- Children: 5
- Education: Portland Bible College (BA)

Bill Sizemore (born June 2, 1951) is an American political activist and writer in Redmond, Oregon, United States. Sizemore has never held elected office, but has nonetheless been a major political figure in Oregon since the 1990s.

He is considered one of the main proponents of the Oregon tax revolt, a movement that seeks to reduce taxes in the state. Oregon Taxpayers United, a political action committee he founded in 1993, has advanced numerous ballot initiatives limiting taxation, and has opposed spending initiatives. Sizemore made an unsuccessful run for Governor of Oregon in 1998. He also announced his intention to run for governor in 2010, but was indicted by the state on charges of tax evasion. The charges were later amended to failure to file tax returns.

== Early life ==
Sizemore was born in Aberdeen, Washington on June 2, 1951. He graduated from Montesano High School in Montesano, Washington, where he played varsity basketball and was voted by his teammates as the best defensive player and most inspirational player. He earned a degree in theology from Portland Bible College in 1976. After graduating, Sizemore taught Old Testament History and Systematic Christian Theology at Portland Bible College and ran a series of businesses, including a retail carpet business, a toy manufacturing company, and two Portland radio stations. For four years, he hosted the Bill Sizemore Show, a two-hour daily news/talk program on Great Talk 1150 AM.

== Ballot initiatives ==
In 1993, Sizemore founded Oregon Taxpayers United and became its executive director. He is noted as the author and driving force behind a number of ballot initiatives in Oregon. One of the first measures Sizemore was involved in was a referendum which stopped Portland's $3.4 billion light rail expansion.

Sizemore added several initiatives in 2008.

Sizemore's most notable success was passing Measure 47 in 1996. The measure rolled back property taxes to 1995 levels. Measure 47 also mandated a double majority for ballot measures increasing taxes. With Sizemore's assistance, the Oregon Legislative Assembly amended some of the provisions of Measure 47 in 1997, and referred the amendments back to the voters as Measure 50, which also passed.

In 2000, Sizemore drafted and placed on the ballot Measure 7, which required governments to pay just compensation to property owners when a government-imposed regulation reduced the fair market value of their property. Oregon voters approved Measure 7, but the Oregon Supreme Court later nullified it. A similar measure, 2004's Measure 37, subsequently passed, and was amended by 2007's Measure 49.

== 1998 gubernatorial election ==
In the 1998 elections, Sizemore ran for Governor of Oregon. He ran as a Republican and won his party's primary, defeating the Republican Party Chairman and three other candidates who had little or no name recognition. During the general election, The Oregonian ran three major articles detailing Sizemore's alleged shady business practices, both in private business and in the operation of his political action committee and non-profit educational foundation. These included one about a "Trail of Debt" he had allegedly left behind, one of which involved an outstanding loan from a fellow church member, which Sizemore says was eventually repaid; one about a fishing club on a private lake, to which he tried to sell memberships before obtaining state permission; and one about an apparently falsified loan application on which he claimed not to have declared bankruptcy when, in fact, he had done so. Sizemore said he did not check the boxes on the loan application relating to bankruptcy and that the loan officer who submitted the application did that on his own. Sizemore lost the November general election to incumbent Governor John Kitzhaber, a Democrat. Sizemore won 30% of the vote, to Kitzhaber's 64%.

== Racketeering case ==
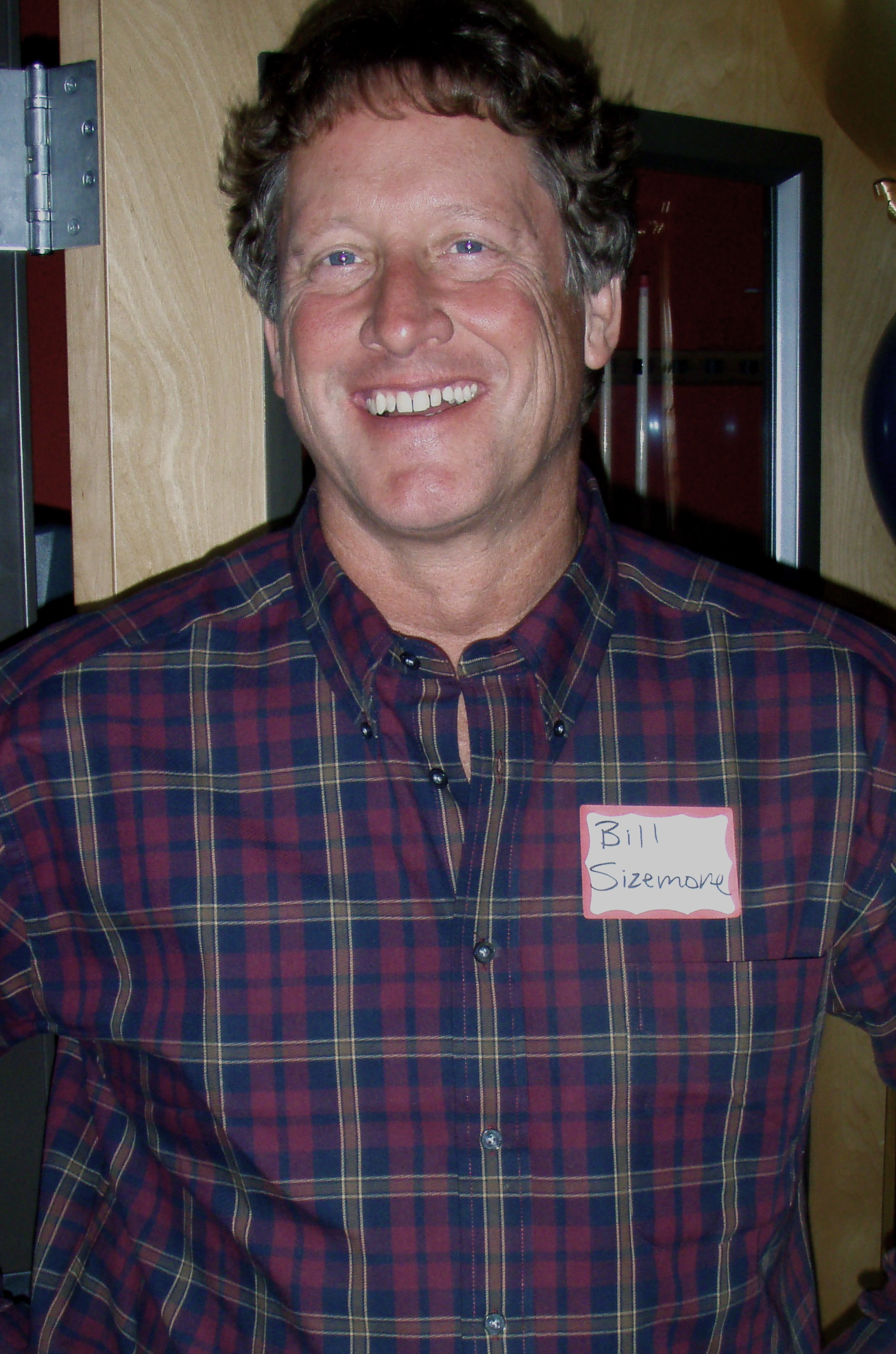
Bill Sizemore (2008)

In July 2000, the Oregon Education Association and the American Federation of Teachers filed a civil racketeering lawsuit against two of Sizemore's organizations: Oregon Taxpayers United and the OTU Education Foundation. Sizemore was not named personally as a defendant or party to the case. During the trial, Becky Miller, Sizemore's top aide, under protection of state and federal immunity deals, testified in detail about allegedly unethical and illegal practices of Oregon Taxpayers United. These included alleged money laundering involving both Sizemore and Americans for Tax Reform founder Grover Norquist, as well as falsification of federal tax returns and state campaign finance reports. Additional testimony reported financial deals allegedly designed to disguise or hide the sources of funding for campaigns, as well as to allow Sizemore to personally profit from the campaigns.

After three weeks of testimony and a million dollars in union legal fees, the jury found Sizemore's organizations guilty of racketeering, and the organizations were fined approximately $2.5 million. Sizemore refused to pay the fines and attempted to continue doing business by changing the name of his organizations to Oregon Taxpayers Association and carrying on with business as usual. After a post-trial hearing in which no evidence was submitted, Sizemore was found personally liable for his organization's civil racketeering liability, and the judge shut down his 501(c)(3) education foundation. On appeal both sides claimed victory, as the Oregon Taxpayers United organizations were found liable for the judgments, but the personal judgment against Sizemore was nullified by the Oregon Supreme Court.

The judge handling the case, Judge Jerome LaBarre, recused himself three years later, informing attorneys that his son was a teachers union member and had been recently elected union president of the Woodburn local.

== Measure 42 in 2006 ==
In 2006, Sizemore broke with his pattern of anti-tax measures by filing Measure 42, a consumer-oriented bill that would have denied insurance companies the ability to take credit scores into account when setting insurance premiums. In the most expensive Oregon ballot measure campaign of 2006, the insurance industry spent $4 million to defeat the measure. The campaign to defeat the measure, which focused heavily on Sizemore's credibility, was successful.

== Arrest in 2008 ==
On December 1, 2008, Sizemore was sent to jail after a Multnomah County judge found him in contempt of court for the fourth time in his long-running legal battle with two Oregon teachers unions. Multnomah County Circuit Judge Janice R. Wilson ordered Sizemore, who was not an officer of the corporation, jailed until he signed and filed federal and state tax forms that charitable organizations are required to complete to maintain their tax-exempt status. He was released the next day on December 2, 2008.

== 2010 gubernatorial election ==
On November 23, Sizemore announced his candidacy for the Republican nomination for Governor of Oregon in 2010.

On November 30, Sizemore and his wife were indicted by the State of Oregon on charges of tax evasion for failing to file state income tax returns for the years 2006–2008. He had previously acknowledged failing to file in sworn testimony and was indicted after he failed to file during Oregon's tax amnesty ended on November 19. Sizemore called the charges politically inspired and said he had paid $51,000 in estimated taxes for 2006 and 2007, but could not file actual returns until an ongoing civil case resolved the amount of his income for the years in question. Teachers union and Department of Justice lawyers had claimed in court that Sizemore had personally taken $850,000 from a nonprofit he had been running, but a later audit by the Oregon Department of Revenue determined that Sizemore's income for the three years in question was $392,000, $500,000 less than the teachers unions and Oregon DOJ lawyers had claimed. In 2011, after the judge in the case ruled that Sizemore would not be allowed to put on any defense, he pleaded guilty to three counts of felony failure to file state income-tax returns, with a plea agreement to serve 30 days jail and 3 years probation. Three years later, Marion County Judge Claudia Burton retroactively converted the felonies to misdemeanors and all of Sizemore's rights were restored.

== See also ==
- List of Oregon ballot measures
- Loren Parks, who has financed numerous Sizemore initiatives
- Tax reform § United States
- Tea Party movement

Party political offices
| Preceded by Denny Smith | Republican nominee for Governor of Oregon; 1998 | Succeeded by Kevin Mannix |
