= Oregon Land Conservation and Development Act of 1973 =

Land use planning law

The Oregon Land Conservation and Development Act of 1973, formally Oregon Senate Bills 100 and 101 of 1973 (SB 100 and SB 101), were pieces of landmark legislation passed by the Oregon State Senate in 1973 and later signed into law. It created a framework for land use planning across the state, requiring every city and county to develop a comprehensive plan for land use.

SB 100 expanded on Senate Bill 10 (SB 10) of 1969. This legislation created the Oregon Land Conservation and Development Commission (LCDC), which expanded on the statewide planning goals of SB 10. It also established the Oregon Department of Land Conservation and Development.

== Planning goals ==
By 1976, the planning goals laid out by the act numbered 19:

1. Citizen Involvement
2. Land Use Planning
3. Agricultural Land
4. Forest Lands
5. Open Spaces, Scenic and Historic Areas, and Natural Resources
6. Air, Water, and Land Resources Quality
7. Areas Subject to Natural Disaster and Hazards
8. Recreational Needs
9. Economy of the State
10. Housing
11. Public Facilities and Services
12. Transportation
13. Energy Conservation
14. Urbanization
15. Willamette River Greenway
16. Estuarine Resources
17. Coastal Shorelands
18. Beaches and Dunes
19. Ocean Resources

== Attempts to repeal ==
An attempt to repeal SB 100 was launched as early as 1976. In an editorial, the Eugene Register-Guard asserted its staff had attended many of the legislative hearings leading to the bills' passage, and that it was "too early to talk about a repeal of Senate Bill 100, when it [had] hardly a chance to work." The initiative petition succeeded in putting Measure 10 on the November ballot, but the measure was the first of many repeal attempts to fail in subsequent decades. The Central Lane County League of Women Voters published a booklet on land use planning that year.

In 2000, Measure 7 passed, but was later overturned by the Oregon Supreme Court; 2004's Measure 37 also passed, but its impacts were lessened with 2007's Measure 49.

== See also ==
- Land use in Oregon
- Hector Macpherson, Jr.
- Wilbur Ternyik
- Tom McCall, Oregon governor intimately involved in the passage of these bills
- Willamette Valley
- Metro (Oregon regional government)
