= Brian Bruney =

American baseball player (born 1982)

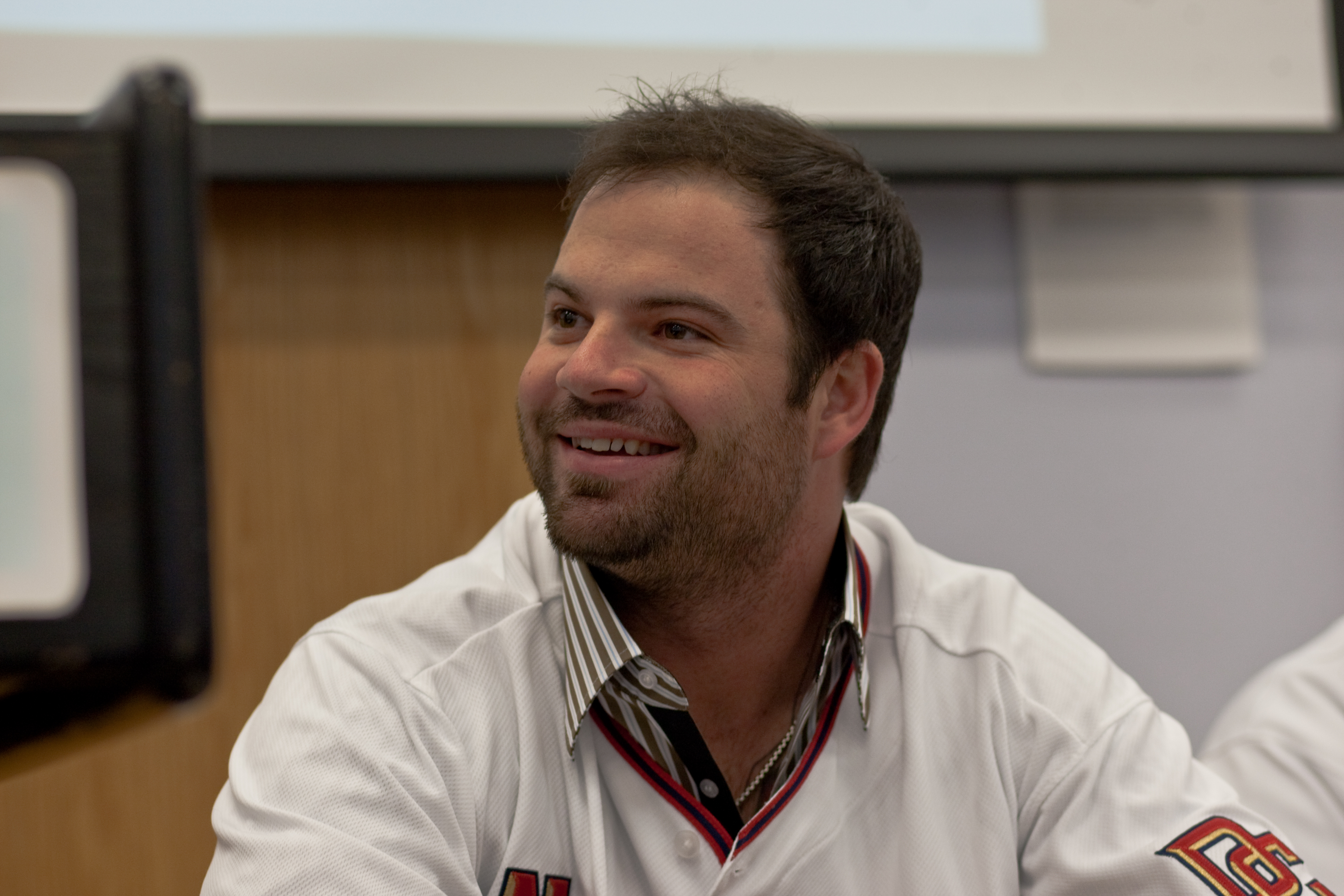
- Bruney with the Washington Nationals
- Pitcher
- Born: February 17, 1982 (age 44); Astoria, Oregon, U.S.
- Batted: Right Threw: Right

MLB debut
- May 8, 2004, for the Arizona Diamondbacks

Last MLB appearance
- June 24, 2012, for the Chicago White Sox

MLB statistics
- Win–loss record: 19–12
- Earned run average: 4.68
- Strikeouts: 252
- Stats at Baseball Reference

Teams
- Arizona Diamondbacks (2004–2005); New York Yankees (2006–2009); Washington Nationals (2010); Chicago White Sox (2011–2012)

Career highlights and awards
- World Series champion (2009)

Brian Anthony Bruney (born February 17, 1982) is an American former professional baseball pitcher. He played in Major League Baseball (MLB) for the Arizona Diamondbacks, New York Yankees, Washington Nationals, and Chicago White Sox. He won the 2009 World Series with the Yankees, beating the Philadelphia Phillies.

== High school career ==
Bruney graduated from Warrenton High School in Oregon. In 2000, he earned Player of the Year honors for the state. He set records for career home runs (34), batting average (.505) and RBIs in a season (52). He ranked third in career strikeouts (277).

== Professional career ==
=== Arizona Diamondbacks ===
Bruney was drafted by the Arizona Diamondbacks in the 12th round (369th overall). That year, he threw 25 innings with the AZL Diamondbacks. In 2001, Bruney reached A ball, pitching for the Short-Season Yakima Bears of the Northwest League and then the South Bend Silver Hawks of the Midwest League. He reached Double-A in 2002, pitching for the El Paso Diablos, and served as the closer for the Scottsdale Scorpions of the Arizona Fall League.

Bruney reached Triple-A in 2003, pitching for the Tucson Sidewinders. He compiled a 2.70 ERA with 26 saves in 63.1 innings to earn the Diamondbacks' minor league pitcher of the year honors. After the season, he pitched for USA Baseball in the 2004 Americas Olympic Baseball Qualifying Tournament. Team USA ultimately did not qualify for the 2004 Summer Olympics after losing to Mexico in the quarterfinals.

Bruney began the 2004 season with the Sidewinders, but was called up to the Diamondbacks on May 8. and made his major league debut that day against the Philadelphia Phillies, tossing a scoreless ninth inning in Arizona's 8–7 loss. He allowed four runs on seven hits and 11 walks in 9.2 innings before he went on the disabled list with elbow inflammation. Bruney returned on July 6 but was demoted after five games and told to incorporate more off-speed pitches. He returned on August 20 and pitched to 4.41 ERA with 18 strikeouts and 12 walks in 16.1 innings through the end of the year. Overall, he poste a 4.31 ERA and struck out 34 batters in 31.1 innings.

Bruney was included on the Diamondbacks opening day roster in 2005. After Brandon Lyon went on the disabled list in May, Arizona tried Bruney as their closer. He saved 12 games in 16 opportunities. Overall, the 2005 season turned out to be a poor showing for Bruney. In 47 relief appearances, he posted a 7.43 ERA in 46 innings.

He began the 2006 season in Triple-A and missed time to an elbow injury. On May 20, Bruney was designated for assignment by the Diamondbacks.

=== New York Yankees ===
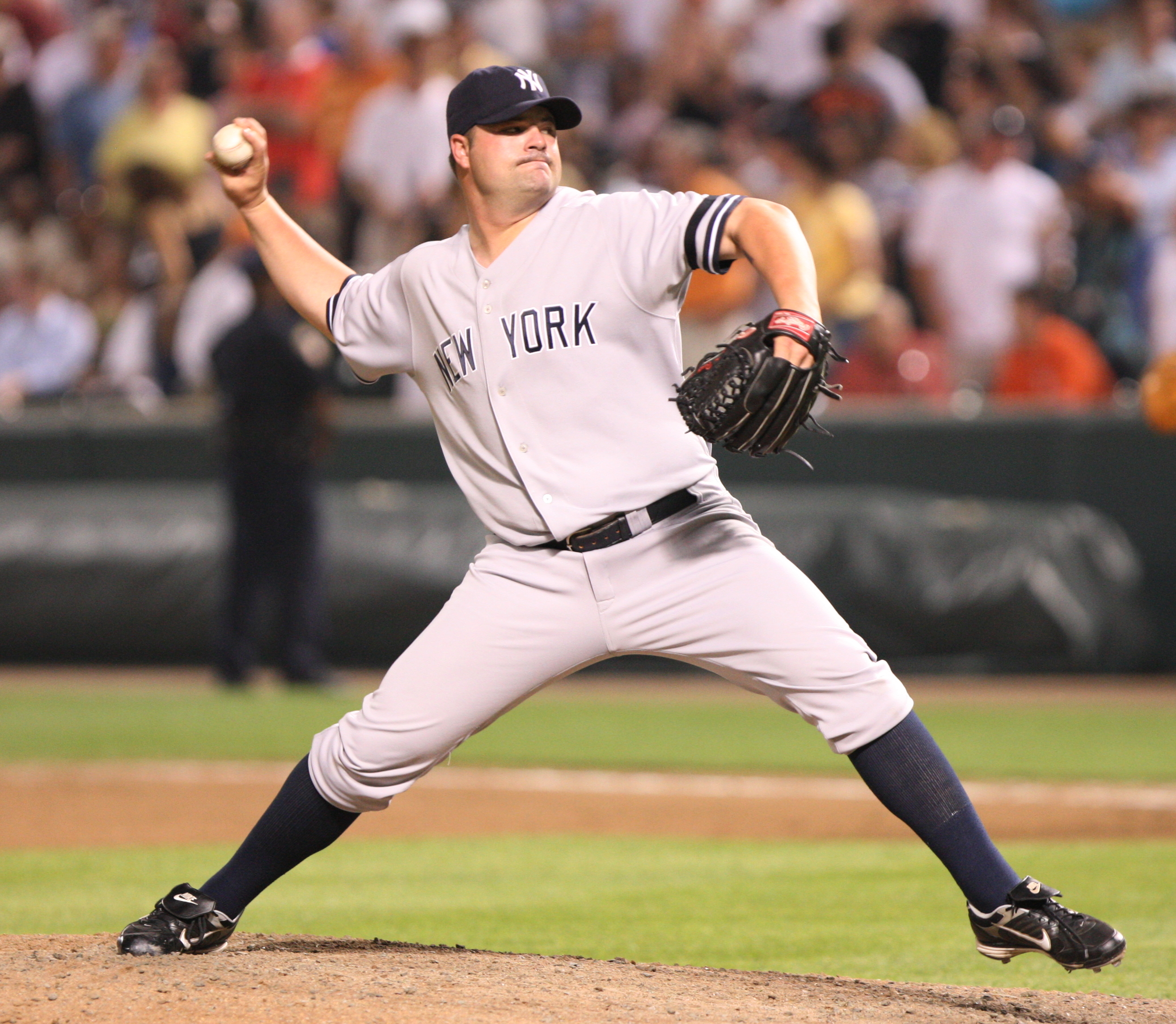
Bruney with the Yankees in 2007.

After he was released by the Diamondbacks, he went two months without playing. His confidence shaken, Bruney considered giving up baseball. He was signed as a minor league free agent by the New York Yankees. Bruney pitched for the Triple-A Columbus Clippers until being recalled by the Yankees. Armed with an upper-90s fastball, mid-80s curveball and an aggressive approach, Bruney quickly established himself as one of the better relief pitchers in the Yankees' bullpen. Bruney finished 2006 with a 1–1 record and a 0.87 ERA in 20.2 innings over 19 games. He was on the playoff roster for the 2006 American League Division Series against the Detroit Tigers.

Bruney was stricken by the flu and a rib cage injury during spring training in 2007, but still managed to crack the opening day roster. He spent most of the season with the Yankees but began to struggle with his control. The Yankees had Bruney change his mechanics, but by August 5, he had walked 30 batters against 32 strikeouts in 42.1 innings. He was then demoted to Triple-A; he later told the media he felt the Yankees should have given him more leeway to fix things. He ended the season with a 4.68 ERA in 58 major league games. Bruney returned August 25 and allowed 10 runs on eight hits and seven walks over 7.2 innings to close out the season.

Bruney reported to spring training 2008 having lost 20 pounds in the offseason, in addition to gaining speed on his fastball. On April 25, 2008, it was learned that Bruney would likely miss the remainder of the season due to a fracture in his foot (Lisfranc) but he chose to forgo foot surgery in order to rehab the injury. After spending time rehabbing in the minors, he returned to the Yankees on August 1 following the trade of Kyle Farnsworth. On January 30, 2009, Bruney signed a one-year deal worth $1.25 million to avoid arbitration with the Yankees. He was slated to be Mariano Rivera's primary setup man going into the 2009 season.

In 2009, Bruney pitched in eight games to start the season before hitting the disabled list with an elbow injury on April 25. He was slow to recover and later revealed he had his the injury during spring training. He returned and pitched one scoreless inning versus the Baltimore Orioles on May 19 before going back on the disabled list. On June 13, 2009, Bruney criticized New York Mets closer Francisco Rodríguez, calling his antics on the mound "unbelievable" and saying that Rodriguez has "got a tired act." Rodríguez responded after the Mets won that day's game by saying "somebody like that, it doesn't bother me," and suggesting that Bruney "better keep his mouth shut and do his job, not worry about somebody else. I don't even know who the guy is. I'm not going to waste my time with that guy. Instead of sending messages through the paper, next time when you see me at Citi Field, come up to me and say it to my face." During batting practice the following day at Yankee Stadium, Rodríguez confronted Bruney on the field, pointing and shouting at him before teammates from both sides could separate the two. He was finally activated on June 16.

Bruney did not appear in the 2009 American League Division Series against the Minnesota Twins or the American League Championship Series against the Los Angeles Angels, but was added to the World Series roster. On October 28, it was announced that Bruney would be replacing backup catcher Francisco Cervelli on the 25-man roster for the World Series.

=== Washington Nationals ===
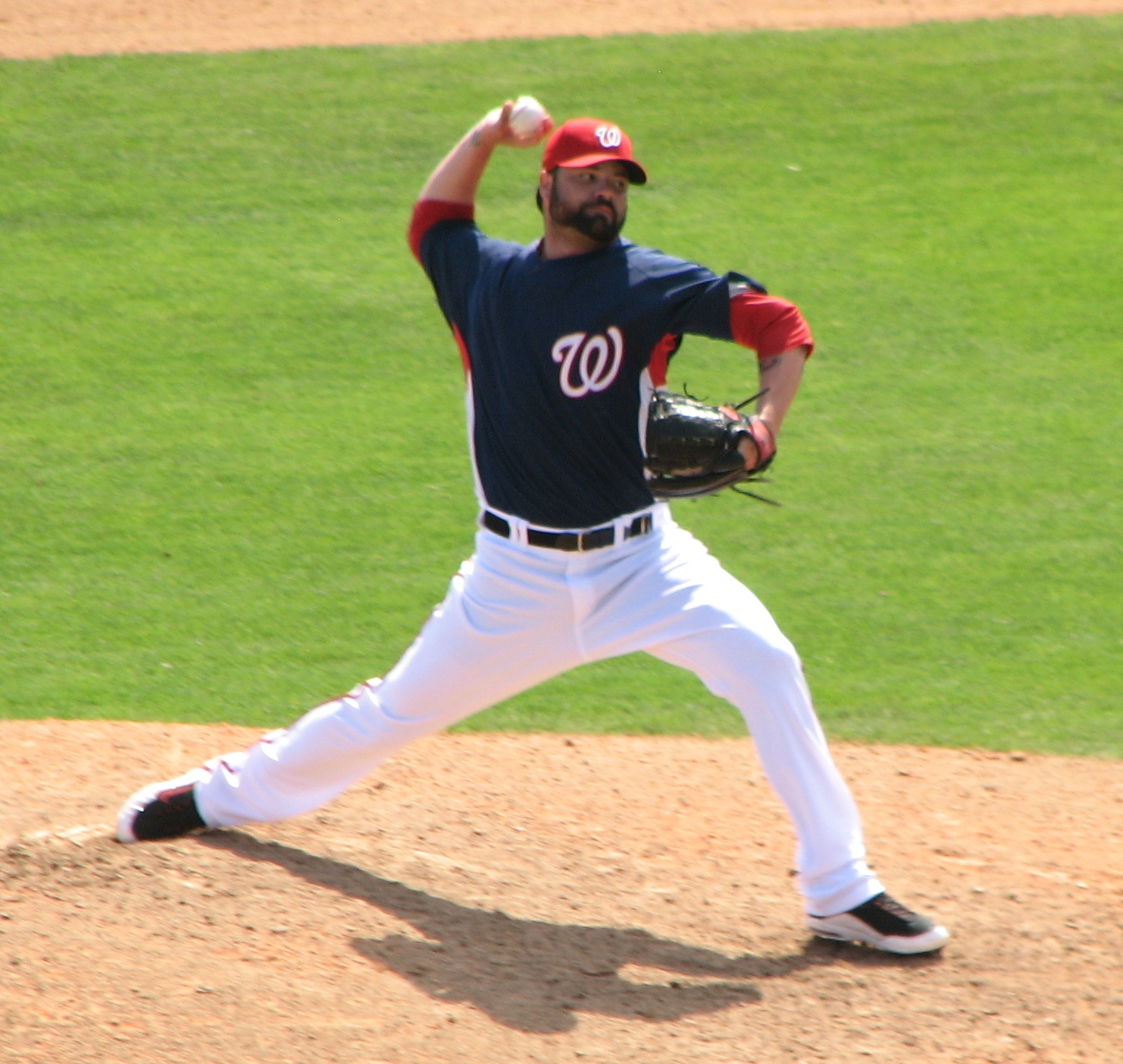
Bruney with the Washington Nationals during spring training in 2010

On December 7, 2009, Bruney was traded to the Washington Nationals for Jamie Hoffmann, Washington's pick in the 2009 Rule 5 draft. After allowing 15 earned runs and walking 20 batters in 17.2 innings, he was designated for assignment on May 17, 2010. Bruney cleared waivers and refused an outright assignment to Triple-A. He was released on May 17.

=== Milwaukee Brewers ===
On June 6, 2010, Bruney signed a minor league contract with the Milwaukee Brewers. He was released on June 21 prior to his opt out date, having pitched 3.1 scoreless innings with the Triple-A Nashville Sounds.

=== New York Mets ===
On July 2, 2010, Bruney signed a minor league contract with the New York Mets. Bruney became a free agent after the 2010 season ended.

=== Chicago White Sox ===
On December 2, 2010, Bruney signed a minor league contract with the Chicago White Sox. He had his contract purchased on May 30, 2011. He made his debut with the White Sox on May 31 against the Boston Red Sox, allowing two runs in 2/3 of an inning. On August 3, he was ejected for arguing a call with first base umpire Marvin Hudson. After the game, White Sox manager Ozzie Guillen and pitching coach Don Cooper both expressed displeasure with Bruney for getting ejected. Two days later, the White Sox designated Bruney for assignment. He was released on August 15 after he cleared waivers and refused an outright assignment.

On November 3, 2011, Bruney re-signed a minor league contract with the White Sox. He was called up from Triple-A Charlotte on June 22, 2012, after Philip Humber was placed on the disabled list. Bruney pitched in one game for Chicago and then went on the disabled list with a hip injury. After spending two months out of action and attempting to rehab the injury, he underwent season-ending hip surgery in August. He became a free agent following the season.

== Personal life ==
As a child, Bruney was an extra in the movie Kindergarten Cop. He is married and has three children; Shelby, Bo, and Bree.

Since the end of his playing career, Bruney is now a youth baseball and basketball coach in Astoria, Oregon. He also opened a restaurant in nearby Seaside in 2020.
