= Wilbur Ternyik =

American civic leader and land use planning advocate

- Born: Wilbur Earl Ternyik; January 26, 1926; Astoria, Oregon
- Died: April 2, 2018 (aged 92)
- Known for: Coastal planning

Wilbur E. Ternyik (January 26, 1926 – April 2, 2018) was an American civic leader who has been characterized as a founding father of coastal planning, a coastal advocate, and a guardian of the Oregon Coast. News coverage of his work has described him as an international expert on sand dunes, and has noted his "decades of work to protect the environment that draws thousands to the Oregon coast." Ternyik's outreach to skeptical local officials in the early 1970s, persuading them to engage with then-Governor Tom McCall's call for land use planning in advance of the state's landmark land use legislation, has been identified as his most significant achievement.

He served multiple terms as the mayor of Florence, Oregon (from 1985 to 1988 and again from 1991 to 1992), as well as 16 years on the Florence City Council and 29 years as a commissioner on the Port of Siuslaw.

== Personal life and military service ==
Wilbur Ternyik was a descendant of Clatsop leader Chief Coboway, who met the Lewis and Clark expedition in 1804 when they arrived at the Pacific Coast near Astoria, Oregon. His father was a Hungarian immigrant. His father moved back to the east coast prior to Ternyik's birth, and his mother suffered from alcoholism; he was mostly raised by his grandparents. Ternyik was born in Astoria and grew up in Warrenton, Oregon, graduating from Warrenton High School. He often wore a tan buckskin jacket and used what he called his "tomahawk peace pipe" as a gavel in meetings.

Ternyik, a U.S. Marine, was awarded a Purple Heart award after an injury on May 10, 1945, during his World War II service in Okinawa. He spent eight months recovering in the hospital from machine gun wounds to his leg. Ternyik had a brain cyst removed in 1991.

== Career ==
At age 16 Ternyik began working part-time for the U.S. Soil Conservation Service, (precursor to Natural Resources Conservation Service). In 1952, Ternyik supervised early efforts to stabilized sand dunes on the Oregon Coast.

In 1953 he established Wave Beach Grass Nursery, and is credited with planting European beach grass in dune stabilization efforts.

Then-governor Tom McCall delivered a speech to coastal government officials in 1970, urging them to engage in land use planning. His speech was poorly received, but Ternyik agreed with him, and set about building a coalition of "people on the coast who wanted to control their own fate." He and this group later persuaded the legislature to establish the Oregon Coastal Conservation and Development Commission (OCCDC). The OCCDC's work would serve as a model for land use legislation later adopted more broadly in Oregon.

In 1971, Ternyik was elected chair of the OCCDC, presiding over a group of 24 elected officials and six at-large representatives appointed by Governor Tom McCall. The commission included "developers and environmentalists, Republicans and Democrats, property right advocates and land use activists, economic doomsayers and coastal naturalists," who all contributed to the discussions. Ternyik's work with the OCCDC was not without controversy. Oregon Student Public Interest Research Group (OSPIRG) criticized OCCDC's estuary planning as potentially destructive of "Oregon's most pristine estuaries." On the other hand, one of the commissioners resigned as chair of two committees, saying he didn't believe the OCCDC gave "enough weight to the economic consequences of proposed environmental restrictions."

Ternyik chaired the Oregon Coastal Conservation and Development Commission (OCCDC) from 1971 to 1975. The OCCDC's central task was to develop an overall land use plan for the coast. According to Dylan Darling of The Register-Guard, "[Ternyik's] impact on the Oregon Coast was conservational — he helped stop drifting dunes by planting grass and guided state and federal laws to protect coastal natural resources". Darling wrote, "The coastal commission's decisions laid the groundwork for state and federal land use laws."

The OCCSC published many reports, including estuary planning guidelines and a historical and archaeological site inventory, as well as interim reports to the Oregon Legislature. Over the years, Ternyik worked with "Governors Tom McCall, Robert Straub and later Victor Atiyeh, in addition to working with state legislators, local elected officials and residents addressing development and implementation of Oregon's Coastal Goals and Guidelines." The Oregon Legislature passed the Oregon Land Conservation and Development Act of 1973, and the OCCDC's work leading to that legislation was acknowledged in a 2006 presentation on the history of land use planning in Oregon.

Lincoln County Planning Director Onno Husing said, "...for years Ternyik was the most influential figure on the Oregon Coast." Husing wrote,

The work of OCC&DC also had a national impact. Senator Mark Hatfield and Senator Bob Packwood could tell their colleagues that Oregonians were already making coastal management a reality. It wasn't a theory. As such, Oregon's successful experience birthing coastal planning played a vital role in the passage of the federal Coastal Zone Management Act (CZMA) in 1972.

Ternyik authored the 1979 book, Beach and Dune Implementation Techniques, "a primer in the field of beach restoration", according to the Siuslaw News. By the mid-1990s, European beach grass was considered an invasive species, harmful to snowy plover habitat.

In 1984, Ternyik promoted an effort to form a new county, to be named "McCall County", out of the western portions of Lane and Douglas counties. He ceased the effort at the request of the governor. "At the time we were being treated like a bunch of garbage, and we'd had enough of it," said Ternyik in 2005. Though the effort was not successful, Ternyik credited the effort with getting the county to treat their coastal constituents "a lot nicer," in part due to nervousness about losing timber revenue.

== Tributes ==
A life-size bronze bust of Ternyik by sculptor Lorenzo Ghiglieri was placed in the Gateway to Discovery building in Seaside by the Bridges Foundation of Turner in 2006. At that tribute, Senator Mark Hatfield said, "Wilbur Ternyik never expected recognition. His work was the tangible creation of his heart's vision." In 2009, the bronze bust was displayed at the state capitol in Salem before being exhibited at the Siuslaw Pioneer Museum in Florence, Oregon.

== See also ==
- Land use in Oregon
