= 1998 Oregon gubernatorial election =

- November 3, 1998
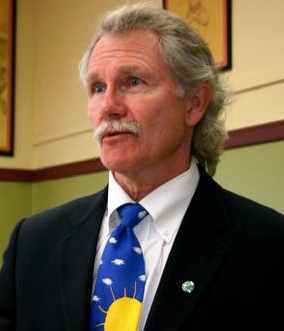

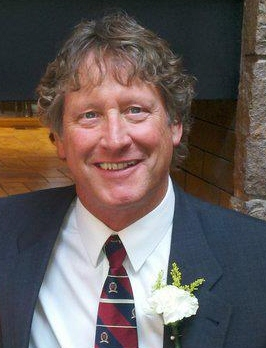
Nominee	John Kitzhaber	Bill Sizemore
Party	Democratic	Republican
Popular vote	717,061	334,001
Percentage	64.42%	30.01%
- County results Kitzhaber: 40–50% 50–60% 60–70% 70–80% Sizemore: 50–60%
Governor before election
John Kitzhaber
Democratic
Elected Governor
John Kitzhaber
Democratic

The 1998 Oregon gubernatorial election took place on November 3, 1998. Incumbent Democrat John Kitzhaber easily defeated Republican Bill Sizemore to win a second term. Kitzhaber won 35 out of 36 counties; the only county won by Sizemore was Malheur County. This is the only gubernatorial election since 1982 in Oregon in which the margin of victory was in double digits. It is also the most recent election in which any county in Eastern Oregon or Southern Oregon voted for the Democratic nominee, and the most recent gubernatorial election in which a candidate would win while carrying the majority of the state's counties. Sizemore ran again for governor in 2010 and 2022 and lost the Republican primary both times.

This election was the first time where an incumbent Democratic Governor of Oregon was re-elected since 1906.

== Primary election ==
Oregon held primary elections on May 19, 1998.

=== Democratic party ===
==== Candidates ====
- Dave Foley, retired engineer
- John Kitzhaber, incumbent governor
- Paul Damian Wells, anti-political party activist

==== Results ====
Democratic primary results
Party	Candidate	Votes	%
Democratic	John Kitzhaber (inc.)	271,781	87.74%
Democratic	Dave Foley	23,870	7.71%
Democratic	Paul Damian Wells	11,933	3.85%
Democratic	Scattering	2,161	0.70%
Total votes		309,745	100.00%

=== Republican party ===
Results by county: Bill Sizemore: 55–60% 50–55% 45–50% 40–45%

==== Candidates ====
- Jeffrey Brady, dentist
- Walter Huss, former Chair of the Oregon Republican Party
- Bill Sizemore, anti-tax activist
- Bill Spidal, investor and former police officer

==== Results ====
Republican primary results
Party	Candidate	Votes	%
Republican	Bill Sizemore	108,036	50.35%
Republican	Walter Huss	39,186	18.26%
Republican	Jeffrey Brady	34,460	16.06%
Republican	Bill Spidal	25,373	11.83%
Republican	Scattering	7,510	3.50%
Total votes		214,565	100.00%

== General election ==
=== Campaign ===
Incumbent governor Kitzhaber emphasized his support of education and the environment.

=== Polling ===
Poll source	Date(s) administered	Sample size (Note: Key: A – all adults RV – registered voters LV – likely voters V – unclear)	Margin of error	John Kitzhaber (D)	Bill Sizemore (R)	Undecided
Davis & Hibbitts	September 30 – October 6, 1998	618 (LV)	± 4.0%	70%	17%	13%
Davis & Hibbitts	March 20–29, 1998	618 (LV)	± 4.0%	67%	26%	7%

=== Results ===
1998 Oregon gubernatorial election
Party	Candidate	Votes	%	±%
Democratic	John Kitzhaber (inc.)	717,061	64.42%	+13.47%
Republican	Bill Sizemore	334,001	30.01%	−12.41%
Libertarian	Richard P. Burke	20,200	1.81%	+0.16%
Pacific Green	Blair Bobier	15,843	1.42%	
Reform	Roger G. Weidner	10,144	0.91%	
Natural Law	Patti Steurer	7,823	0.70%	
Socialist	Trey Smith	5,772	0.52%	
Write-in	Scattering	2,254	0.20%	
Total votes		1,113,098	100.00%	
Majority		383,060	34.41%	
Democratic hold		Swing	+25.88%	

=== Results by county ===
Kitzhaber was the first Democrat since Charles H. Martin in 1934 to win Jefferson County, Josephine County, and Sherman County. As of 2026, this is also the most recent election in which those three counties, along with Baker County, Coos County, Crook County, Curry County, Deschutes County, Douglas County, Gilliam County, Grant County, Harney County, Jackson County, Klamath County, Lake County, Linn County, Morrow County, Polk County, Sherman County, Umatilla County, Union County, Wallowa County, Wheeler County, and Yamhill County have backed a Democrat in a gubernatorial election.

County	John Kitzhaber Democratic		Bill Sizemore Republican		Richard P. Burke Libertarian		Blair Bobier Green		All Others Various		Margin		Total votes cast
County	#	%	#	%	#	%	#	%	#	%	#	%	Total votes cast
Baker	3,360	53.23%	2,631	41.68%	110	1.74%	35	0.55%	176	2.79%	729	11.55%	6,312
Benton	20,278	69.40%	6,918	23.67%	516	1.77%	952	3.26%	557	1.91%	13,360	45.72%	29,221
Clackamas	73,559	63.42%	37,372	32.22%	1,932	1.67%	1,068	0.92%	2,053	1.77%	36,187	31.20%	115,984
Clatsop	9,086	69.90%	3,212	24.71%	215	1.65%	151	1.16%	334	2.57%	5,874	45.19%	12,998
Columbia	10,956	65.16%	4,867	28.94%	365	2.17%	170	1.01%	457	2.72%	6,089	36.21%	16,815
Coos	14,233	59.59%	7,971	33.37%	520	2.18%	332	1.39%	828	3.47%	6,262	26.22%	23,884
Crook	2,934	53.31%	2,313	42.02%	89	1.62%	32	0.58%	136	2.47%	621	11.28%	5,504
Curry	5,086	55.06%	3,498	37.87%	187	2.02%	81	0.88%	386	4.18%	1,588	17.19%	9,238
Deschutes	22,274	56.64%	14,840	37.73%	894	2.27%	475	1.21%	846	2.15%	7,434	18.90%	39,329
Douglas	19,874	54.43%	14,340	39.27%	780	2.14%	293	0.80%	1,229	3.37%	5,534	15.16%	36,516
Gilliam	543	69.00%	220	27.95%	10	1.27%	2	0.25%	12	1.52%	323	41.04%	787
Grant	1,585	50.43%	1,354	43.08%	74	2.35%	11	0.35%	119	3.79%	231	7.35%	3,143
Harney	1,323	47.78%	1,308	47.24%	27	0.98%	8	0.29%	103	3.72%	15	0.54%	2,769
Hood River	3,936	66.98%	1,662	28.28%	88	1.50%	88	1.50%	102	1.74%	2,274	38.70%	5,876
Jackson	33,875	59.52%	19,984	35.11%	1,077	1.89%	632	1.11%	1,345	2.36%	13,891	24.41%	56,913
Jefferson	3,080	60.32%	1,771	34.68%	89	1.74%	25	0.49%	141	2.76%	1,309	25.64%	5,106
Josephine	13,177	48.74%	11,382	42.10%	775	2.87%	407	1.51%	1,296	4.79%	1,795	6.64%	27,037
Klamath	9,074	49.14%	8,464	45.83%	360	1.95%	97	0.53%	472	2.56%	610	3.30%	18,467
Lake	1,516	48.81%	1,425	45.88%	62	2.00%	18	0.58%	85	2.74%	91	2.93%	3,106
Lane	76,998	68.33%	28,367	25.17%	2,170	1.93%	2,634	2.34%	2,512	2.23%	48,631	43.16%	112,681
Lincoln	11,858	66.88%	4,776	26.94%	353	1.99%	289	1.63%	453	2.56%	7,082	39.95%	17,729
Linn	19,747	58.85%	12,163	36.25%	611	1.82%	267	0.80%	765	2.28%	7,584	22.60%	33,553
Malheur	3,348	45.26%	3,711	50.17%	85	1.15%	31	0.42%	222	3.00%	-363	-4.91%	7,397
Marion	56,181	64.53%	26,858	30.85%	1,292	1.48%	724	0.83%	2,006	2.30%	29,323	33.68%	87,061
Morrow	1,731	66.30%	766	29.34%	25	0.96%	12	0.46%	77	2.95%	965	36.96%	2,611
Multnomah	155,137	73.29%	42,657	20.15%	3,735	1.76%	5,093	2.41%	5,061	2.39%	112,480	53.14%	211,683
Polk	13,173	63.67%	6,583	31.82%	282	1.36%	184	0.89%	467	2.26%	6,590	31.85%	20,689
Sherman	564	65.51%	254	29.50%	25	2.90%	2	0.23%	16	1.86%	310	36.00%	861
Tillamook	6,980	68.53%	2,717	26.68%	155	1.52%	105	1.03%	228	2.24%	4,263	41.86%	10,185
Umatilla	9,127	63.86%	4,549	31.83%	194	1.36%	72	0.50%	351	2.46%	4,578	32.03%	14,293
Union	5,364	60.72%	3,015	34.13%	157	1.78%	54	0.61%	244	2.76%	2,349	26.59%	8,834
Wallowa	1,713	54.35%	1,294	41.05%	52	1.65%	19	0.60%	74	2.35%	419	13.29%	3,152
Wasco	5,788	67.73%	2,328	27.24%	134	1.57%	56	0.66%	240	2.81%	3,460	40.49%	8,546
Washington	83,455	65.52%	38,680	30.37%	2,202	1.73%	1,183	0.93%	1,849	1.45%	44,775	35.15%	127,369
Wheeler	376	54.18%	267	38.47%	21	3.03%	7	1.01%	23	3.31%	109	15.71%	694
Yamhill	15,772	58.95%	9,484	35.45%	537	2.01%	234	0.87%	728	2.72%	6,288	23.50%	26,755
Total	717,061	64.42%	334,001	30.01%	20,200	1.81%	15,843	1.42%	25,993	2.34%	383,060	34.41%	1,113,098

==== Counties that flipped from Republican to Democratic ====
- Baker
- Coos
- Crook
- Curry
- Deschutes
- Douglas
- Gilliam
- Grant
- Harney
- Jackson
- Jefferson
- Josephine
- Klamath
- Lake
- Linn
- Marion
- Morrow
- Polk
- Sherman
- Umatilla
- Union
- Wallowa
- Wheeler
- Yamhill
