= 2006 Washington Initiative 933 =

Initiative 933
- Property Rights

Results
Choice	Votes	%
Yes	839,992	41.18%
No	1,199,679	58.82%
County results
Yes: 50–60% 60–70%	No: 50–60% 60–70% 70–80%

Ballot Initiative 933 was a ballot initiative in the U.S. state of Washington in 2006. It concerned land use planning, and was voted down by 59% in the 2006 elections.

The controversial initiative pitted the interests of real estate developers against environmental protection and preservation of natural resources.

The initiative is also known as I-933, titled "Property Rights" by the Secretary of State, "The Property Fairness Initiative" by its supporters, and the "Developers Initiative" by its opponents.

== Content of the proposal ==
I-933 called for government agencies in the State of Washington to evaluate the effects directly on private real and personal property when implementing regulations or ordinances. It called for these government agencies to follow certain policies: either pay compensation when "damaging" property, to consider "less restrictive means," or to waive the implementation of the regulation.

== Cost ==
According to a study conducted by the University of Washington the initiative would have cost taxpayers an estimated $7.8 Billion during the first five years after enactment. The same study also found that "Virtually every county would likely be faced with claims, yet none have a tax revenue source in place for paying them."

== Other effects ==
I-933 would have impacted critical areas that are protected to prevent flooding and protect fish, wildlife and groundwater. Though it was described as establishing a "pay or waive" system, I-933 did not have the power to permit waivers in most relevant cases. This would have resulted in a "stymied decision" and uncertainty for both landowners and local governments, with the result of slowing down development permits.

I-933 would likely have led to a greater role for federal government in the region.

The initiative would have had implications not only for real estate, but on intellectual property rights, water rights, motor vehicles, securities and intangible commercial assets.

== People and organizations involved ==
=== Supporters ===
Supporters of I-933 argued that the proposal would have protected private property owners from "excessive land-use regulations or proposed regulations that damage the use and value of private property."

A significant portion of the financial support for the campaign came from Americans for Limited Government, a libertarian-oriented group based in Illinois.

Other supporters of the measure included:

- Bainbridge Citizens United
- Spokane Pro-America
- Washington Cattleman's Association
- Washington Contract Loggers Association
- Farm Bureaus from Washington State

=== Opponents ===
Opponents of the initiative questioned why taxpayers should have "to pay some land owners to follow laws already on the books or waive those protections for the community". I-933 required taxpayers to pay legal fees for all claims, including retroactive claims. Opponents of the proposal also pointed out that the Washington Farm Bureau represents primarily large corporations and has an established record of supporting Republican candidates with PAC money. The Association of Washington Cities argued the Initiative would have cost taxpayers 4.5 billion dollars a year in claims against municipalities. Environmentalists claimed "Initiative 933 would dismantle ... (environmental) protections, making it extremely difficult to enforce the Clean Air Act and the Clean Water Act." Moreover, I-933 allocated no funding for the payments it required, raising fears that taxes would have been increased and/or that funding to key infrastructural programs would have been cut. Lobbyists in favor of the bill dismissed these accusations as scare tactics. On October 10, 2006, all six of Washington's living former governors joined current Gov. Christine Gregoire to oppose Initiative 933. "I-933 is an extremely vague and loophole-ridden initiative that exposes our taxpayers to great expense," said former Gov. Gary Locke.

Organizations that opposed the initiative included:

- Former Governors Booth Gardner (D), Daniel J. Evans (R), Gary Locke (D), Mike Lowry (D), John Spellman (R)
- State Senators Luke Esser (R), Mary Margaret Haugen (D)
- State Representatives Fred Jarrett (R), Sam Hunt (D)
- American Institute of Architects, Washington Council and Seattle Chapter
- Greater Seattle Chamber of Commerce
- American Planning Association
- Washington State Building Trades
- AFSCME - Washington State Council of County & City Employees
- Washington State Labor Council
- Various neighborhood associations
- Washington Association of Churches
- American Lung Association of Washington
- Washington Physicians for Social Responsibility
- National Wildlife Federation
- United Farm Workers
- Amalgamated Transit Union Locals 1015 and 757
- American Federation of State, County, and Municipal Employees - Councils 2 and 28
- International Brotherhood of Electrical Workers Locals 112 and 483
- Ironworkers Local 14
- National Association of Letter Carriers 791
- Service Employees International Union, Washington State Council
- UNITE HERE Local 8
- United Food and Commercial Workers - Washington State Council and Local 21
- Democracy for America (Bellingham and Kitsap Bainbridge)
- Washington State Democrats, and 12 county committees and 17 legislative districts
- King County Young Democrats
- Green Party of Washington State
- League of Women Voters of Washington
- Permanent Defense
- American Federation of Teachers, Washington
- Audubon Society Washington
- Sierra Club Northwest and Cascade Chapter
- Surfrider Foundation Northwest Straits and Seattle Chapters
- The Nature Conservancy of Washington
- Cascade Bicycle Club
- Washington Conservation Voters
- Affiliated Tribes of Northwest Indians

== Precedents ==
I-933 was similar to Initiative 164, a 1995 bill passed by the Washington legislature and subsequently repealed by ballot initiative (referendum 48.)

It was also similar to Oregon Ballot Measure 37 (2004), as well as numerous 2006 initiatives promoted in other states (nearly all of which were defeated.)

== Results ==
2006 Washington Initiative 933
Choice	Votes	%
For	839,992	41.18
Against	1,199,679	58.82
Total	2,039,671	100.00
Source: Washington Secretary of State

=== By county ===
County results
County	No		Yes		Margin		Total votes
County	#	%	#	%	#	%	Total votes
Adams	1,472	42.80%	1,967	57.20%	-495	-14.39%	3,439
Asotin	3,859	53.76%	3,319	46.24%	540	7.52%	7,178
Benton	21,279	44.13%	26,944	55.87%	-5,665	-11.75%	48,223
Chelan	11,037	48.40%	11,767	51.60%	-730	-3.20%	22,804
Clallam	18,276	61.04%	11,666	38.96%	6,610	22.08%	29,942
Clark	55,780	49.70%	56,456	50.30%	-676	-0.60%	112,236
Columbia	825	44.09%	1,046	55.91%	-221	-11.81%	1,871
Cowlitz	13,368	43.96%	17,039	56.04%	-3,671	-12.07%	30,407
Douglas	5,037	46.12%	5,885	53.88%	-848	-7.76%	10,922
Ferry	1,044	37.62%	1,731	62.38%	-687	-24.76%	2,775
Franklin	4,597	36.78%	7,900	63.22%	-3,303	-26.43%	12,497
Garfield	566	49.35%	581	50.65%	-15	-1.31%	1,147
Grant	8,727	44.97%	10,680	55.03%	-1,953	-10.06%	19,407
Grays Harbor	12,143	55.68%	9,666	44.32%	2,477	11.36%	21,809
Island	19,645	66.22%	10,022	33.78%	9,623	32.44%	29,667
Jefferson	10,558	66.19%	5,392	33.81%	5,166	32.39%	15,950
King	412,024	66.97%	203,213	33.03%	208,811	33.94%	615,237
Kitsap	56,192	62.85%	33,209	37.15%	22,983	25.71%	89,401
Kittitas	5,744	47.38%	6,380	52.62%	-636	-5.25%	12,124
Klickitat	2,933	40.52%	4,305	59.48%	-1,372	-18.96%	7,238
Lewis	9,923	39.48%	15,212	60.52%	-5,289	-21.04%	25,135
Lincoln	2,426	52.26%	2,216	47.74%	210	4.52%	4,642
Mason	12,064	57.26%	9,006	42.74%	3,058	14.51%	21,070
Okanogan	5,489	43.12%	7,242	56.88%	-1,753	-13.77%	12,731
Pacific	3,719	43.38%	4,855	56.62%	-1,136	-13.25%	8,574
Pend Oreille	2,461	48.62%	2,601	51.38%	-140	-2.77%	5,062
Pierce	114,772	55.01%	93,854	44.99%	20,918	10.03%	208,626
San Juan	5,340	66.22%	2,724	33.78%	2,616	32.44%	8,064
Skagit	28,691	70.69%	11,897	29.31%	16,794	41.38%	40,588
Skamania	1,583	40.21%	2,354	59.79%	-771	-19.58%	3,937
Snohomish	123,483	60.94%	79,143	39.06%	44,340	21.88%	202,626
Spokane	85,059	56.34%	65,903	43.66%	19,156	12.69%	150,962
Stevens	7,585	45.27%	9,171	54.73%	-1,586	-9.47%	16,756
Thurston	53,844	64.59%	29,517	35.41%	24,327	29.18%	83,361
Wahkiakum	708	40.27%	1,050	59.73%	-342	-19.45%	1,758
Walla Walla	8,146	46.49%	9,376	53.51%	-1,230	-7.02%	17,522
Whatcom	42,200	62.22%	25,625	37.78%	16,575	24.44%	67,825
Whitman	7,456	58.55%	5,279	41.45%	2,177	17.09%	12,735
Yakima	19,624	36.73%	33,799	63.27%	-14,175	-26.53%	53,423
Totals	1,199,679	58.82%	839,992	41.18%	359,687	17.63%	2,039,671
