= Warrenton High School (Oregon) =

Public school in Warrenton, Oregon, United States

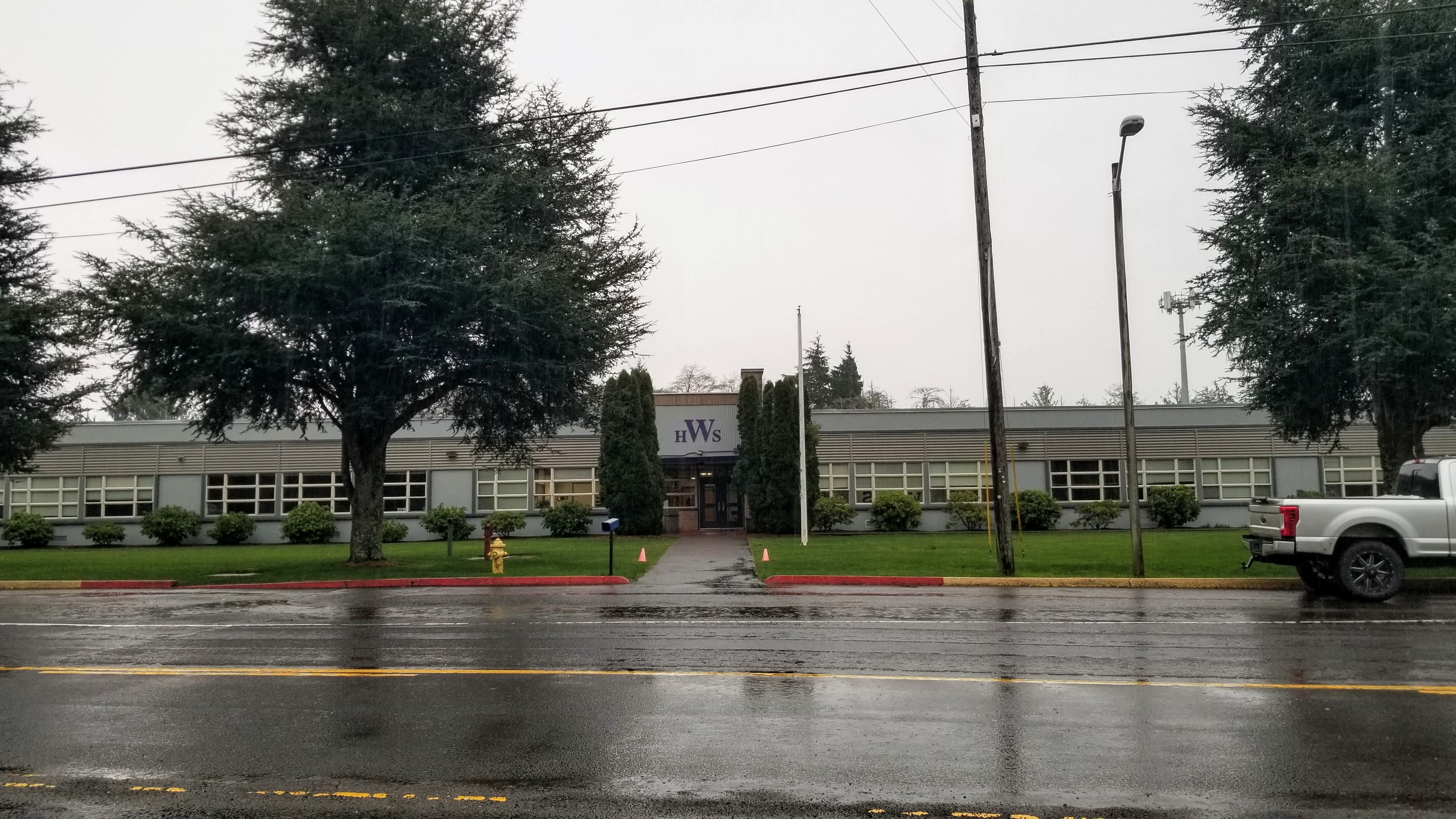

Location
- 1700 SE Main; Warrenton, (Clatsop County), Oregon 97146; United States; 46.147254°N 123.92826°W

Information
- Type: Public
- Opened: 1920
- School district: Warrenton-Hammond School District
- Principal: Dionne Marshall
- Teaching staff: 15.63 (FTE)
- Grades: 9-12
- Enrollment: 267 (2017–18)
- Student to teacher ratio: 17.08
- Campus size: 25 acres (100,000 m^{2})
- Campus type: Rural
- Colors: Purple and white
- Athletics conference: OSAA
- Mascot: Warrior
- Rival: Knappa
- Website: Warrenton High School

Warrenton High School (WHS) is a public high school in Warrenton, Oregon, United States. It is home to one of the first on-campus high school fish hatcheries and aquaculture programs in the state of Oregon.

== Academics ==
In 2008, 86% of the school's seniors received their high school diploma. Of 70 students, 60 graduated, eight dropped out, and two were still in high school the following year.

Warrenton High School offers seven opportunities for college credit through Clatsop Community College.

== Fisheries program ==
The Fisheries Program at WHS started as the "fish farm club" and became the aquaculture class in the early 1960s. The program was conceived and began in the late 1950s. It started with rearing salmonids in buckets and releasing them into the on-campus Skipanon River, and grew to eventually being one of the pioneers of netpen rearing in the Pacific Northwest, with the first netpens built in the 1960s. Warrenton was founded under water and after its diking and incorporation as a city, it still was mostly wetland. The fish rearing operation had only a 2"x6" wide wooden catwalk as the only means of reaching the operation, until the early 1970s when the Oregon National Guard cleared and built a road to the pump shed. The first on-campus fish hatchery was built in 1974 by the aquaculture, shop, welding, and PE classes alongside community volunteers directing the engineering.

During the early to mid-1980s, the operations expanded to the Warrenton Municipal Sewer Ponds in the form of netpens. This operation recorded extremely high growth rates. The fish were tested and later released. The test results revealed that the fish were healthy and consumable, despite their environment.

A new 2,000 sq ft (190 m^{2}) fisheries rearing and research facility was built by Warrenton High Fisheries, Inc. (WarHF), a non-profit corporation founded in 2005 by a then sophomore, Henry Balensifer. It was finished in 2007.

In 2010, WarHF received funds from the Oregon Department of Fish and Wildlife Restoration and Enhancement Board to assist in the construction of the first rain-powered hatchery in the state. While it may be the first in the nation, that claim has not yet been officially vetted.

== Wetlands and softball field construction ==
In 2009 in order to create a new softball field, the school needed to transplant an area of wetland. This project was to continue through 2011, until the wetland is once again fully functioning.

== Notable alumni ==
- Brian Bruney - relief pitcher for the Washington Nationals
- Wilbur Ternyik - known for Coastal Planning leading to passage of the federal Coastal Zone Management Act in 1972
