= Land use in Oregon =

Laws affecting land ownership

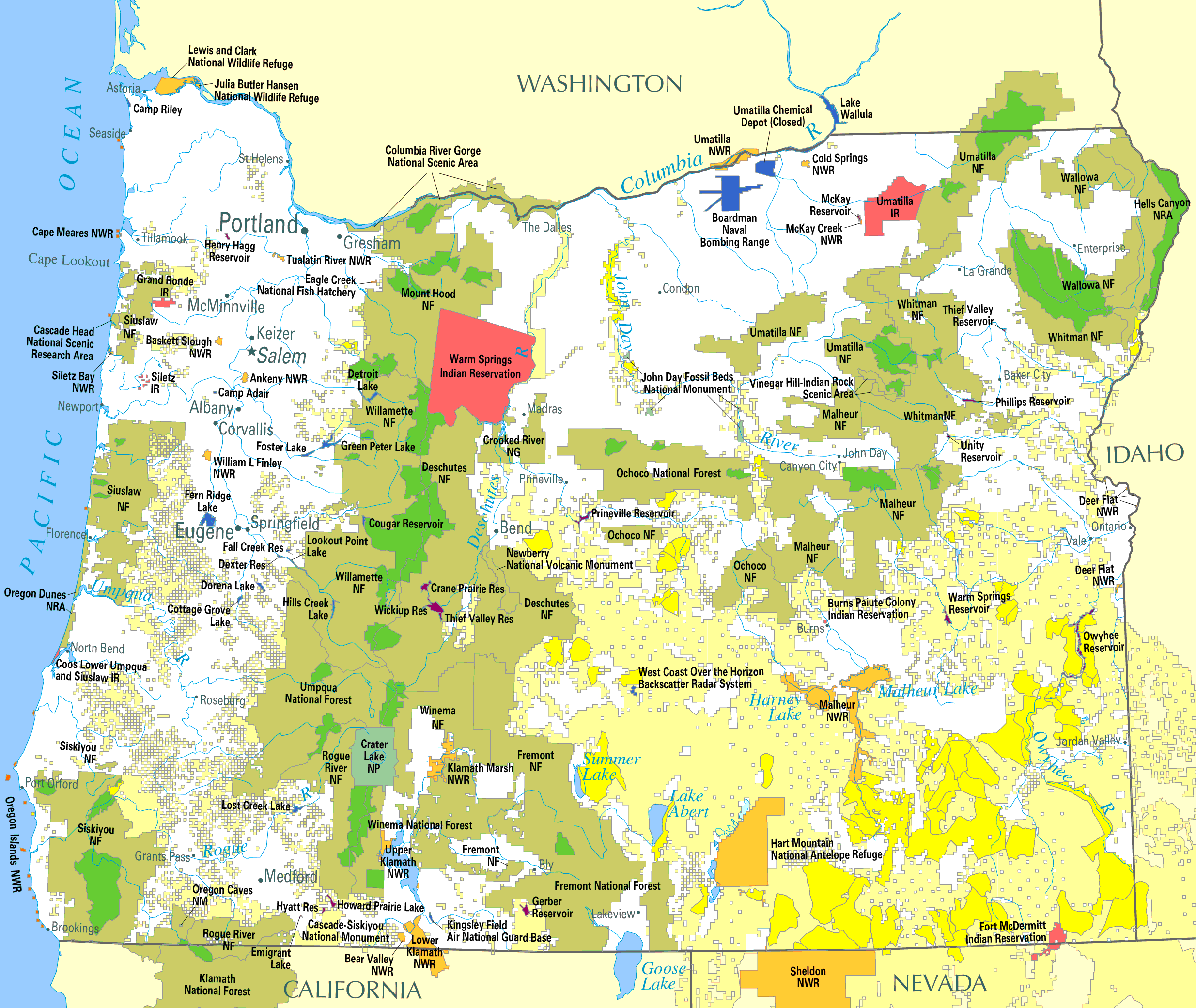
Map of federal land ownership in Oregon Bureau of Indian Affairs Bureau of Land Management(BLM) BLM Wilderness Area Department of Defense Fish and Wildlife Service (FWS) FWS Wilderness Area Forest Service (FS) FS Wilderness Area National Park Service

The U.S. state of Oregon has had an evolving set of laws affecting land ownership and its restrictions.

== Timeline ==
- 1822: Henry Schenck Tanner's map of the U.S. is likely the first to identify the "Oregon Terry."
- 1850: Donation Land Act
- 1851: Willamette Stone sited, became the basis for property lines throughout Oregon and Washington.
- 1862: Homestead Act (in effect till 1976, and 1986 in Alaska)
- October 27, 1868: Corvallis College (now Oregon State University) was designated Oregon's first and only Land Grant College under the federal Morrill Land-Grant Colleges Act.
- 1869: Oregon and California Railroad (O&C) receives land grant from US government with mandate to sell to settlers at $2.50/acre
- 1878: Timber and Stone Act

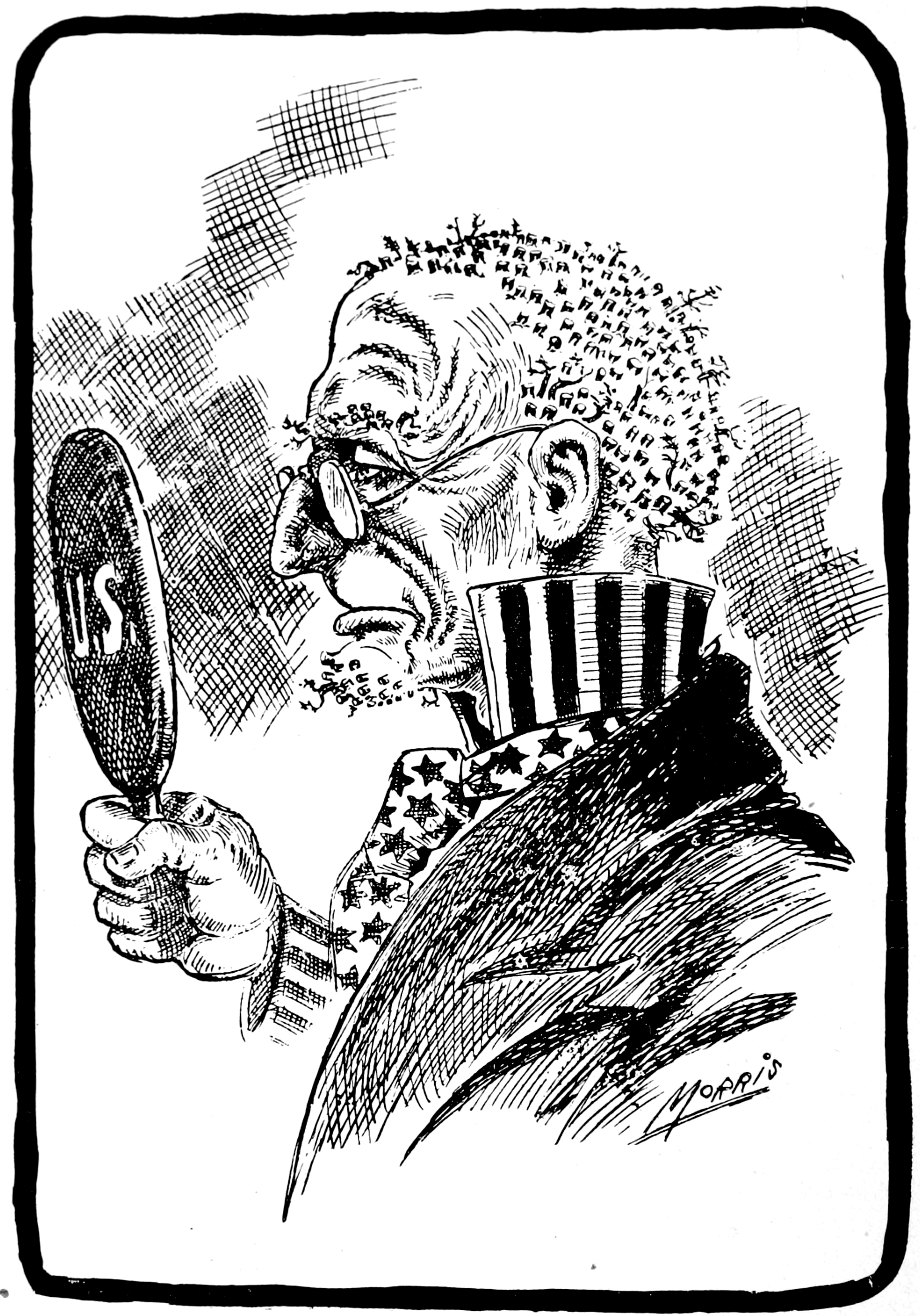
William Charles Morris cartoon, illustrating the prediction of Secretary of the Interior Gifford Pinchot, who warned U.S. timber resources in the west would be depleted.

- 1903: Southern Pacific Railroad, which acquired the O&C railroad, announces it will no longer sell land, in violation of terms of the land grant
- up to 1905: Abuse of land grant process results in Oregon land fraud scandal
- 1907: Three Arch Rocks first National Wildlife Refuge established west of Mississippi
- 1907: Walter Lafferty begins lawsuit on behalf of 18 western Oregon counties affected by the land fraud scandal
- 1913: public access to beaches formalized—originally for use as highways—codified general public understanding under Oswald West
- 1916: U.S. Congress passes Chamberlain-Ferris Act, which established payments for timber sales on 2.4 million acres of O&C lands, located in 18 Oregon counties; modified by the Stanfield Act of 1926
- 1937: Congress passes the Oregon and California Railroad and Coos Bay Wagon Road Grant Lands Act of 1937 (O&C Act), which further modifies the terms of the timber payments to O&C counties; payments are reduced in 1953.
- 1933–1951: Fire destroys much of what is now known as the Tillamook State Forest in the Tillamook Burn
- 1961: Farm tax deferral
- 1963: Exclusive Farm Use (EFU) zoning
- 1967: Oregon Beach Bill establishes public ownership of land along the Oregon Coast
  - Willamette River Greenway
- 1969: Senate Bill 10 required comprehensive land use plans for every city and county.
  - Sohappy v. Smith, along with Washington's Boldt Decision, established fishing rights for Native Americans
- 1970: Measure 11 failed (44%)
- 1971: Oregon Coastal Conservation and Development Commission (see Wilbur Ternyik)
- 1973: Many county-owned forests, largely owned as a result of property foreclosures, dedicated as Tillamook State Forest
- 1981: Senate votes down Senate Bill 945
- 1990: The northern spotted owl is listed as threatened as part of the Endangered Species Act; logging on federal lands is ended by court order
- 1993: Congress passes the Omnibus Budget Reconciliation Act of 1993 which replaces timber payments with "safety net" payment to 72 rural counties, including the O&C counties. Payments are to last until 2000.
- 1994: The Northwest Forest Plan is implemented and defines land use on federal lands in the Northwest that sharply reduces timber harvest
- 2000: Congress passes the Secure Rural Schools and Community Self-Determination Act of 2000 (SRSCSDA) (often called the county payments program), which authorizes western counties, including the 18 O&C counties along with 15 more Oregon counties with other federal lands, to receive federal payments to compensate for loss of timber revenue for 6 years.
- 2001: Northwest Coastal Forest Plan established, aimed to balance demands on forests in Tillamook and Clatsop counties. Largely regarded as a failure by 2008.
- 2006: SRSCSDA ends and is not reauthorized; as part of another bill, the U.S. Troop Readiness, Veterans' Care, Katrina Recovery, and Iraq Accountability Appropriations Act, 2007, payments were extended another year
- 2007: No extension to SRSCSDA is passed and federal payments to rural Oregon counties end; beginning July 1, 2008 Oregon loses $238 million in federal payments
- 2008: 4-year extension to SRSCSDA is surprisingly included in Emergency Economic Stabilization Act of 2008. Rep. DeFazio and Sen. Wyden, two of the biggest supporters of extending the payments to Oregon counties, vote against the bill due to their opposition to the overall bailout bill.
- 2011: With the extension to SRSCSDA expiring soon, backed by Governor John Kitzhaber and the entire Oregon congressional delegation, Senator Ron Wyden introduces legislation to extend the payments for another five years. Republican and Democratic members of Oregon's congressional delegation have proposed setting aside some of the federal land in Oregon as public trusts in which half would be designated for harvest to provide revenue for the counties, and half designated as a conservation area.
- 2012: The extension to SRSCSDA expires in January. President Obama's proposed 2013 United States federal budget includes $294 million to extend the program for fiscal year 2013 with a plan to continue the payments for four more years, with the amount declining 10% each year. Congress does not take up the President's proposal, but include a one-year extension to SRSCSDA in its omnibus transportation bill, which is signed by the President. This is expected to be the last renewal of the program.
- 2025: SRSCSDA is reauthorized after a two-year funding gap, the partial compensation provided through fixed federal payments has diminished over time, often resulting in funding shortfalls in rural Oregon county governments.

=== Senate Bill 100 ===
- 1973: Senate Bills 100 and 101 established Oregon Land Conservation and Development Commission, Oregon Department of Land Conservation and Development, etc. Led to adoption of 14 statewide planning goals and created statewide protections for farmland.
- 1976: Measure 10 failed (39%) Measure 12 sought to repeal SB 100. Failed by 60+%.
- 1978: Measure 10 sought to repeal SB 100. Failed (39% yes)
- 1979: Land Use Board of Appeals (LUBA) created
- 1982: Measure 6 sought to repeal SB 100. Fails (45% yes)
- 1991: PAPA and PR Reform
- 1993: Legislature passes HB 3661 and expands ability to build houses on farm and forestland.
- 1995: Republicans introduce multiple bills that strip SB 100. Democrats stop them.
- 1997: Republicans introduce multiple bills that strip SB 100. Democrats stop them.
- 1998: Measure 65 (sought to roll back land use regulation, failed)
- 1999: Measure 56 passed 80%
- 2000: Measure 2 (sought to roll back land use regulation, failed, 47% yes)
  - Measure 7 — an amendment to the Oregon Constitution which is subsequently declared illegal — passed. controversial but uncontested title language(?) Overturned by Oregon Supreme Court.
- 2004: Measure 37 passed (61%). controversial, uncontested title language(?)
- 2005–2009: Oregon Big Look Task Force, a citizen commission created by SB 82 of the 2005 session, charged with bringing land use recommendations to 2009 legislature.
- 2007: Measure 49 repeals/modifies much of Measure 37.

== See also ==
- Urban growth boundary
- United States Bureau of Reclamation
- United States Bureau of Land Management
- United States Forest Service
- Gifford Pinchot, Theodore Roosevelt
- Oregon State Land Board
- List of Oregon ballot measures
- Oregonians In Action (led by Dave Hunnicut, backers of "property rights movement" since late '90s?)
- 1000 Friends of Oregon (opposed 37, proponents of 49, very farm-aligned)
- Regulatory taking—the concept that regulating land use constitutes a "taking" of property value, thus should be considered an exercise of eminent domain
- Oregon Department of State Lands (and the Common School Fund)
