= 2006 Oregon Ballot Measure 39 =

Ballot Measure 39
- Limitations on Eminent Domain

Results
Choice	Votes	%
Yes	881,820	67.13%
No	431,844	32.87%
Yes
80–90%
70–80%
60–70%
50–60%

Oregon Ballot Measure 39, passed in the 2006 General Election, is a ballot measure that prohibits the government from condemning property from one private party (by eminent domain) on behalf of another private party.

Advocates both for and against the measure advanced misleading arguments during the 2006 campaign: once in a Voter's Pamphlet article by the League of Women Voters, and again in a radio advertisement by Oregonians In Action.

== Financing ==
The campaign for Measure 39 was heavily financed by Oregonians In Action, a political action committee that previously drove the campaign for Oregon Ballot Measure 37 (2004).

The Oregon Family Farm Association PAC, which contributed more than half of the money in support of ballot measure 39 and nearly all of the money in support of ballot measure 40, received 82 percent of its funding from just seven donors, including Loren Parks, several timber interests and a developer. Measure 39 has garnered no organized opposition. Unions and lawyers dominate fundraising in opposition to Measure 40.

Of the $622,160 the Family Farm Association PAC raised, 82% came from seven donors: Loren Parks $200,000 (32.1%); Norman Brenden and Swanson Group, Inc. $60,250 (9.7%) each; A-Dec Dental Equipment and Seneca Sawmill Company $51,250 (8.2%) each; Hire Calling Public Affairs (Jeld-Wen) and Columbia Helicopters/Wes Lematta $43,750 (7.0%) each.

== See also ==
- List of Oregon ballot measures
