= Oregonians In Action =

Oregonians in Action (OIA) is an organization in Oregon, United States, that seeks to reduce land use regulation. There are four legal entities that have used this name, but the one that is most active as of 2006 is the political action committee. Its committee number is 2793. It has existed since 1989, but gained prominence when it took over the campaign for Ballot Measure 7 in 2000.

This group also backed Measure 37 in 2004 which—similar to Measure 7—required the government to reimburse property owners whose property value is negatively impacted by land use regulation. OIA also supported Measure 39 in 2006, which restricted the government's power of eminent domain. David Hunnicutt, President of OIA, was chief petitioner for Oregon Ballot Measure 2 (2000).

== Finances ==
OIA received $55,000 from the Neighborhood Preservation Committee in the first half of 2006.

OIA's expenditures in the 2006 General Election cycle included $8000 to four Republican candidates for the Oregon Legislative Assembly: Ted Ferrioli, Sal Esquivel, Kim Thatcher, and Fred Girod.

== See also ==
- List of Oregon ballot measures
- Land use in Oregon
