= 2000 Oregon Ballot Measure 7 =

Ballot Measure 7, an Oregon, United States ballot initiative that passed with over 53% approval in 2000, amended the Oregon Constitution, requiring the government to reimburse land owners when regulations reduced the value of their property.

It was overturned by the Oregon Supreme Court, but Measure 37 in 2004 was largely similar. Measure 37 differed from Measure 7 in several key ways:

- Measure 37 did not amend the Constitution.
- Measure 37 gave government the option to waive regulations, rather than reimburse a property owner.
- Measure 37 was retroactive.

Voters in neighboring Washington had considered a similar measure, Initiative 164, in the mid-1990s, but did not pass it.

Oregonians In Action ran the campaign supporting Measure 7, after taking it over from Bill Sizemore's organization, Oregon Taxpayers United. 1000 Friends of Oregon opposed Measures 7 and 37.

== See also ==
- Land use in Oregon
- List of Oregon ballot measures
