= Oregon Department of Revenue =

Tax collection agency of Oregon, U.S.

The Oregon Department of Revenue is the principal tax collection agency in the U.S. state of Oregon. It is charged with administering the state's tax laws and collection of state taxes including personal and corporate income and excise taxes; gift and inheritance taxes; and tobacco taxes and those imposed by more than thirty other tax programs. The agency also has the responsibilities for collection of delinquent fees and other accounts on behalf of various state agencies, and provides training to local and regional government finance officials and their staffs. In addition, it appraises and establishes value for properties owned by utilities, forest lands, and most large industrial properties for county tax assessors, who are responsible for administration and collection of property taxes within the state.
