= 2006 Idaho Proposition 2 =

Proposition 2
- Shall the above-entitled measure [see text] proposed by Proposition Two be approved?

Results
Choice	Votes	%
Yes	105,778	23.94%
No	336,083	76.06%

Idaho Proposition 2 was a 2006 ballot initiative in the state of Idaho, U.S. that aimed to force government to reimburse property owners whose property value is decreased as a result of government regulation.

The initiative, which is similar to the controversial Oregon Ballot Measure 37 (2004), was defeated.

== Text ==
The long title of the proposition states:

AN INITIATIVE RELATING TO EMINENT DOMAIN; AMENDING SECTION 7 701, IDAHO CODE, TO PROVIDE LIMITATIONS ON EMINENT DOMAIN FOR PRIVATE PARTIES, AND FOR URBAN RENEWAL OR ECONOMIC DEVELOPMENT PURPOSES; AND PROVIDE FOR FURTHER JUDICIAL REVIEW OF PROCEEDINGS INVOLVING THE EXERCISE OF EMINENT DOMAIN; ADDING A NEW SECTION 7-701A TO PROVIDE FOR DEFINITIONS RELATING TO HIGHEST AND BEST USE, FAIR MARKET VALUE, JUST COMPENSATION, AND LAND USE LAW; AND AMENDING CHAPTER 80, TITLE 67, IDAHO CODE, TO PROVIDE FOR JUST COMPENSATION WHEN A REGULATORY ACTION REDUCES FAIR MARKET VALUE OF PROPERTY AND TO PROVIDE JUST COMPENSATION TO A CONDEMNEE.

== Result by county ==
County	Yes	Yes %	No	No %
Ada	29,002	24.68%	88,493	75.32%
Adams	387	23.08%	1,290	76.92%
Bannock	4,298	17.70%	19,991	82.30%
Bear Lake	752	33.59%	1,487	66.41%
Benewah	633	22.17%	2,222	77.83%
Bingham	2,278	17.87%	10,473	82.13%
Blaine	1,394	19.19%	5,870	80.81%
Boise	851	29.88%	1,997	70.12%
Bonner	3,505	25.47%	10,258	74.53%
Bonneville	5,505	18.24%	24,674	81.76%
Boundary	877	27.82%	2,275	72.18%
Butte	258	23.16%	856	76.84%
Camas	70	15.59%	379	84.41%
Canyon	11,672	27.80%	30,320	72.70%
Caribou	371	14.75%	2,145	85.25%
Cassia	1,274	22.40%	4,413	77.60%
Clark	68	20.30%	267	79.70%
Clearwater	827	28.40%	2,085	71.60%
Custer	585	30.92%	1,307	69.08%
Elmore	1,583	27.64%	4,026	72.36%
Franklin	1,402	36.76%	2,412	63.24%
Fremont	788	18.08%	3,570	81.92%
Gem	1,597	28.45%	4,016	71.55%
Gooding	778	18.93%	3,332	81.07%
Idaho	2,056	32.60%	4,250	67.40%
Jefferson	1,420	19.34%	5,921	80.66%
Jerome	921	19.64%	3,869	80.36%
Kootenai	9,873	26.74%	27,051	73.26%
Latah	2,793	23.69%	8,999	76.31%
Lemhi	807	26.01%	2,296	73.99%
Lewis	413	30.28%	951	69.72%
Lincoln	298	20.82%	1,133	79.18%
Madison	1,331	16.68%	6,650	83.32%
Minidoka	1,038	20.39%	4,053	79.61%
Nez Perce	3,438	29.08%	8,384	70.92%
Oneida	448	29.97%	1,047	70.03%
Owyhee	994	36.52%	1,728	63.48%
Payette	1,883	32.79%	3,860	67.21%
Power	327	15.63%	1,765	84.37%
Shoshone	1,034	27.90%	2,672	72.10%
Teton	643	21.02%	2,416	78.98%
Twin Falls	3,532	18.47%	15,594	81.53%
Valley	846	21.92%	3,014	78.08%
Washington	973	29.09%	2,372	70.91%

Source: Idaho Secretary of State

Proposition 2 results by county No: 80–90%; 70–80%; 60–70%
