= 2007 Oregon elections =

- November 6, 2007

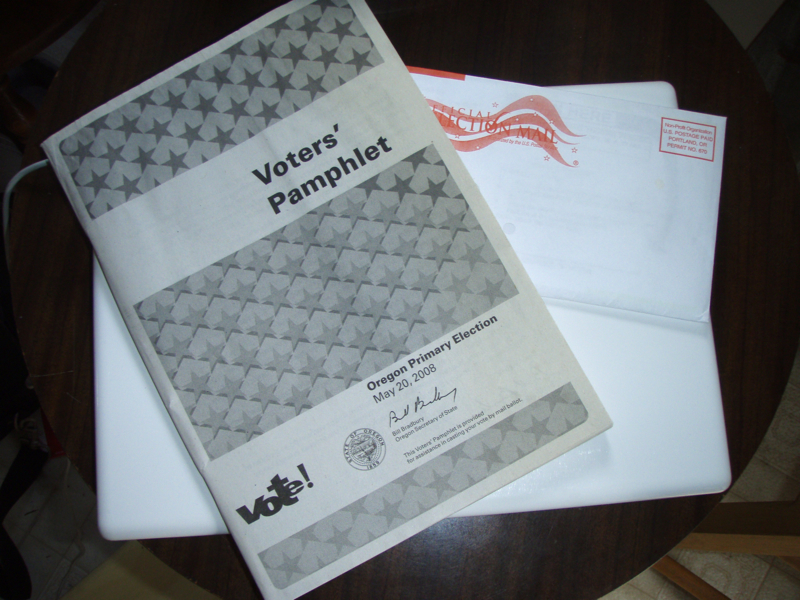
Oregon's elections are conducted by mail, and are accompanied by a Voters' Pamphlet like the one pictured here.

The November 6th, 2007, special election was an off-year election in which no members of the Congress, statewide offices, or members of the Oregon Legislative Assembly were scheduled for election. However, two statewide measures were referred by the legislature to the ballot. They touched on important enough issues that they attracted one hundred seventy-five arguments in total, both in favor of and against them, in the voter's pamphlet.

October 16 was the last day someone could have registered to vote in this election if this was their first time voting in Oregon. Because of a new centralized voter registration database, a voter previously registered could still move within the state, and could change their address until Election Day at 8 pm and still vote.

== Ballot measures ==
=== Measure 49 ===
Modifies Measure 37; clarifies right to build homes; limits large developments; protects farms, forests, groundwater.

Measure 49
Choice	Votes	%
For	718,023	62.15
Against	437,351	37.85
Total	1,155,374	100.00
Valid votes	1,155,374	99.33
Invalid/blank votes	7,836	0.67
Total votes	1,163,210	100.00
Registered voters/turnout		60.02

=== Measure 50 ===
Amends Constitution: Dedicates funds to provide health care for children, fund tobacco prevention, through increased tobacco tax..

Measure 50
Choice	Votes	%
For	472,063	40.75
Against	686,470	59.25
Total	1,158,533	100.00
Valid votes	1,158,533	99.60
Invalid/blank votes	4,677	0.40
Total votes	1,163,210	100.00
Registered voters/turnout		60.02

== See also ==
- Seventy-fourth Oregon Legislative Assembly
- Elections in Oregon
