= Oregon Department of Land Conservation and Development =

Oregon State regulatory agency

Agency overview
- Website: www.oregon.gov/LCD

The Oregon Department of Land Conservation and Development (DLCD) is the chief land-use planning and regulatory agency of the government of the U.S. state of Oregon. The DLCD administers the statewide land use planning program. A seven-member volunteer citizen board known as the Land Conservation and Development Commission (LCDC) guides DLCD.

Oregon's statewide land use planning program – originated in 1973 under Senate Bill 100 – provides protection of farm and forest lands, conservation of natural resources, orderly and efficient development, coordination among local governments, and citizen involvement. One of the primary objectives of the program is to create a predictable and sustainable development process by allocating land for industrial, commercial and housing needs within urban growth boundaries.

Under the program, all cities and counties have adopted comprehensive plans that meet mandatory state standards. The standards are set forth in 19 Statewide Planning Goals that address land use, development, housing, transportation, and conservation of natural resources. Periodic review of plans and technical assistance in the form of grants to local jurisdictions are key elements of the program.

Prior to passage of SB100, despite early state actions implementing some state land policy through its jurisdiction over state highways, land use planning was almost exclusively exercised by municipalities and counties.
