= 1000 Friends of Oregon =

US non-profit organization

- Founded: October 11, 1974; 52 years ago
- Tax ID no.: 93-0642086
- Legal status: 501(c)(3) nonprofit organization
- Headquarters: Portland, Oregon
- President: Eloise Koehler
- Executive Director: Sam Diaz
- Revenue: $2,616,737 (2020)
- Expenses: $1,498,219 (2020)
- Endowment: $2,874,004
- Employees: 14 (2022)
- Website: friends.org

1000 Friends of Oregon is a private, non-profit 501(c)(3) organization that advocates for land-use planning. It was incorporated on October 11, 1974, following the creation of Oregon's statewide land-use system in 1973 by then-governor Tom McCall and attorney Henry Richmond. By 1994, the organization had about 2,500 contributors and supporters. Richmond served as the organization's first executive director.

Richmond was succeeded as executive director in later years by Robert Liberty (in 1994), Bob Stacey (2002–2009), Jason Miner (March 2010 to November 2016), Russ Hoeflich (April 2017), and Sam Diaz (October 2021).

== Past initiatives ==
During the 1980s, one of the group's ongoing activities was fighting what it saw as improper land-use by the rapidly growing community of Rajneeshpuram, created in a rural part of central Oregon by the followers of the guru Bhagwan Shree Rajneesh.

=== Measures 37 and 49 ===
The group strongly opposed Measure 37, a controversial land-use ballot initiative passed by Oregon voters in 2004. 1000 Friends brought litigation in 2005 that led to Measure 37's being ruled unconstitutional by a circuit court, but the ruling was later overturned by the Oregon Supreme Court. The organization then advocated for the passage of 2007's Measure 49, which voters ultimately approved, and which limited the impacts of Measure 37.

== See also ==
- Land use in Oregon
- Hector Macpherson Jr.
