= Loren Parks =

American businessman and politician (1926–2023)

- Born: July 27, 1926; Wichita, Kansas, U.S.
- Died: October 13, 2023 (aged 97); Hillsboro, Oregon, U.S.
- Education: B.A. Psychology
- Occupation: Businessman

Loren Ernest Parks (July 27, 1926 – October 13, 2023) was an American businessman from the state of Nevada. He previously lived in Oregon, from 1957 to 2002, and was the biggest political contributor in the history of that state. He financed numerous ballot measure initiative petitions and campaigns from the mid-1990s. He also contributed heavily to races for prominent offices by his attorney, Kevin Mannix, a frequent chief petitioner of ballot campaigns.

== Early life ==
Loren Ernest Parks was born in Wichita, Kansas, on July 27, 1926. He served in the United States Navy from 1944 to 1946. He had a bacehlor of arts in psychology, having studied at five different universities. He spoke several languages. Parks married Auramae in 1951 while living in Minneapolis, Minnesota. The marriage produced three children, Gary, Raymond and Nancy (Sopp) before a divorce in 1972.

Parks started a business while living in Aloha, Oregon, in the Portland area. He founded Parks Medical Electronics in 1961. The business sold a number of instruments, including a plethysmograph, which measures the blood flow to sexual organs and is used in treating sexual dysfunction and assessing the arousal of sex offenders.

== Oregon politics ==
From 1996 to 2006, Parks contributed over $6 million to various political campaigns – far more than any other individual, and more than most organized lobbies. His entry into backing political concerns followed the passage of Ballot Measure 5 in 1990. His support was instrumental in launching Oregon Taxpayers United, according to executive director Bill Sizemore. Parks' dominance of the ballot measure system was said to undermine the grassroots intent of the system. Parks made contributions to uphold the Oregon Death with Dignity Act in 1997.

Parks was also a strong supporter of former state legislator and gubernatorial candidate Kevin Mannix. Mannix served as Parks' attorney. Parks' staff once said: "Mr. Parks thinks Kevin is one of the few leaders who keeps his word and gets things done." Parks did not indiscriminately back Mannix's proposed measures. In 2008, for instance, he declined to fund a proposed initiative that would have allowed for expanded local regulation of strip clubs. As a result, Mannix stopped pursuing ballot qualification. In 2008, Parks was the source of over half the money used to qualify ballot measures for the statewide ballot. None of the measures he supported in that year was successful. In March 2014, Parks gave a $30,000 donation to Greg Barreto (R) of Cove, Oregon towards his campaign for Oregon state legislature. That donation was returned in April.

== Later life and death ==
In 2001, a former employee filed a sexual harassment complaint and lawsuit against Parks. Parks moved from Oregon to Henderson, Nevada, in 2002. Parks was also a major contributor to charitable organizations, including health care and environmental concerns. Parks was not religious, but was a believer in faith healing. Parks died in Hillsboro, Oregon, on October 13, 2023, at the age of 97.

== See also ==
- List of Oregon ballot measures
- Oregon Ballot Measure 11 (1994)
