= Oregon Education Association =

U.S. public education employees' union

Oregon Education Association (OEA)
- Oregon Education Association
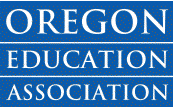

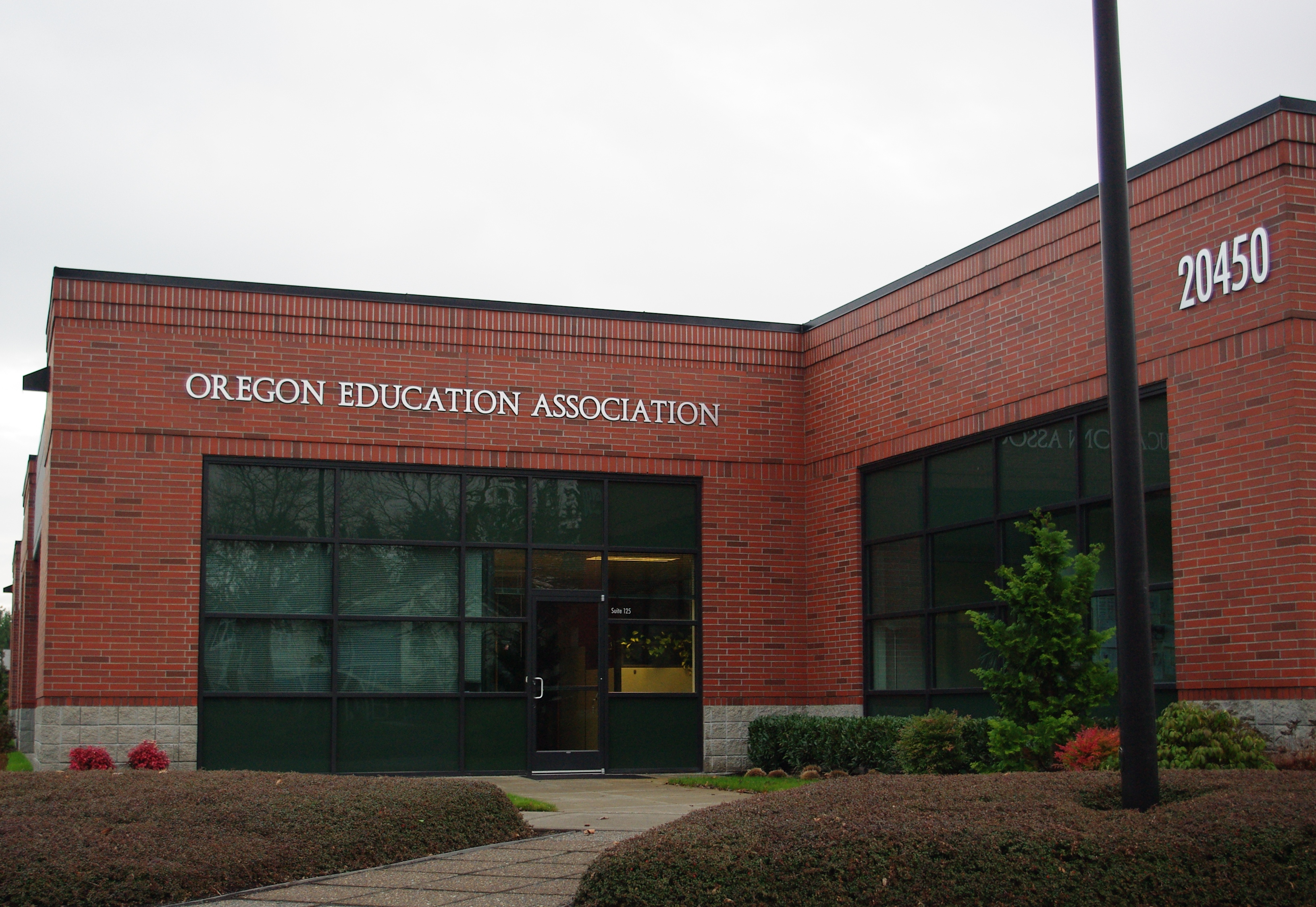
- Hillsboro office
- Founded: 1927
- Headquarters: 6900 SW Atlanta Street; Portland, OR 97223
- Location: Oregon
- Members: 44,000 (2016)
- Key people: Reed Scott-Schwalbach, President Tracy-Ann Nelson, Executive Director
- Affiliations: National Education Association (NEA)
- Website: oregoned.org

The Oregon Education Association (OEA) stands as the largest public education employees' union in the U.S. state of Oregon, advocating for the interests of 44,000 teachers and classified personnel. With local affiliates established in each of the state's 199 public school districts and 8 community colleges, the OEA serves as the state affiliate of the National Education Association.

Founded in 1927 as a non-profit educational organization, the Oregon Education Association (OEA) predates Oregon's Teacher-Board Consultation Law by almost four decades, marking one of the earliest collective bargaining laws for teachers in the United States. Its origins can be traced back to the Oregon State Educational Association, established in 1858. While the OEA engages in activities commonly associated with organized labor, it also prioritizes public educational policy and professional development programs.

In September 2008, the union's own professional-level employees went on strike against the union as their employer, protesting their workload and benefits. The strike was resolved, and the professional staff returned to work on October 13, 2008.
