= Bunn =

Bunn is a surname. Notable people with the surname include:

- Alfred Bunn (1796–1860), English theatrical manager
- Bennie M. Bunn (1907–1943), American Marine officer killed in World War II
- Beverly Atlee Bunn, birth name of American author Beverly Cleary
- Fru T. Bunn, fictional character from Viz
- George Bunn (disambiguation)
- Jim Bunn (b. 1956), former U.S. Congressman from Oregon
- John Bunn (basketball), American basketball coach
- John Whitfield Bunn and Jacob Bunn, American financiers, industrialists, and friends of Abraham Lincoln
- Leon Bunn (b. 1992), German professional boxer
- Olivia Bunn (b. 1979), Australian equestrian
- Romanzo Bunn, United States federal judge
- Stan Bunn (b. 1946), American state legislator in Oregon
- Tom Bunn, American state legislator in Oregon
- William M. Bunn, American politician

== See also ==
- Bunn-O-Matic Corporation, Illinois-based manufacturer of coffee equipment founded by George R. Bunn Jr. and owner of the BUNN brand
- Bunn, North Carolina
- Justice Bunn (disambiguation)
