= Oregon's 8th Senate district =

American legislative district

Oregon's 8th Senate District as of September 27, 2021

District 8 of the Oregon State Senate comprises northwestern Linn County, northeastern Benton County, and southern Marion County centered around Albany and Corvallis. It is composed of Oregon House districts 15 and 16. It is currently represented by Democrat Sara Gelser Blouin of Corvallis.

== Election results ==
District boundaries have changed over time. Therefore, senators before 2021 may not represent the same constituency as today. From 1993 until 2003, the district covered parts of north Portland, and since 2003, it has covered slightly different areas in Benton and Linn Counties, though maintaining its focus around Albany and Corvallis. The current district differs from the previous iteration by adding more land to the north and south of Corvallis in Benton County while also adding rural exurbs of Salem in southern Marion County.

The results are as follows:

Year	Candidate	Party	Percent	Opponent	Party	Percent	Opponent	Party	Percent
1984	Bill McCoy	Democratic	78.4%	Francis Chadwick McKenna	Republican	21.6%	No third candidate		
1988	Bill McCoy	Democratic	100.0%	Unopposed					
1992	Bill McCoy	Democratic	58.2%	Mike Fitz	Republican	41.8%	No third candidate		
1996	Thomas A. Wilde	Democratic	64.3%	Mike Fitz	Republican	35.7%	No third candidate		
2000	Margaret Carter	Democratic	79.3%	Whitney Smith	Pacific Green	19.3%	No third candidate		
2002	Frank Morse	Republican	54.6%	Barbara Ross	Democratic	45.4%	No third candidate		
2006	Frank Morse	Republican	58.9%	Mario Magana	Democratic	40.8%	No third candidate		
2010	Frank Morse	Republican	55.0%	Dan Rayfield	Democratic	44.7%	No third candidate		
2014	Sara Gelser	Democratic	55.3%	Betsy Close	Republican	44.2%	No third candidate		
2018	Sara Gelser	Democratic	63.0%	Erik Parks	Republican	34.7%	Brian Eggiman	Libertarian	2.2%
2022	Sara Gelser Blouin	Democratic	59.8%	Valerie Draper Woldeit	Republican	40.1%	No third candidate		
