= Senator Bunn =

Senator Bunn may refer to:

- Henry Gaston Bunn (1838–1908), Arkansas State Senate
- Jim Bunn (born 1956), Oregon State Senate
- Stan Bunn (born 1946), Oregon State Senate
