= Frank Morse (Oregon politician) =

American politician

Member of the Oregon State Senate from the 8th district
- In office 2003–2012
- Preceded by: Mae Yih
- Succeeded by: Betsy Close

Personal details
- Born: Lebanon, Oregon
- Party: Republican
- Spouse: Linda
- Education: Oregon State University
- Occupation: Businessman

Frank Morse is an American politician served as a member of the Oregon State Senate for the 8th district from 2003 until 2012. He was first elected in 2002, defeating Democrat Barbara Ross, and was re-elected in 2006 and 2010. In September 2012, Morse resigned his office, stating that it was "time for new energy" in the position.

== Early life and education ==
Frank Morse was born and raised in Lebanon, Oregon. He graduated from Lebanon High School in 1961, and went on to earn degrees from Oregon State University and Northwest Christian College.

== Career ==
=== Business ===
Morse has been part of the Morse Bros. family business since 1972, serving in the following positions: Albany Division Manager, Vice President of Operations, Executive Vice President, President, and Chairman. When Morse Bros. merged with MDU Resources Group, Frank continued as President until his retirement in 2000. He moved on to a new business, Environ-Metal Inc., and currently chairs its board.

Morse has also headed the boards of the Albany Chamber of Commerce, Cascade Employers Association, Oregon Concrete and Aggregate Producers Association, Greater Pacific Bank, Samaritan Albany General Hospital Board, Samaritan Health Services Board, and Northwest Christian College Trustees.

He has also served on the boards of the Albany Boys and Girls Club, the Vern Catt McDowell Corporation, Western Security Bank, OSU Family Business Council, Cockerline Foundation, and Albany Boys and Girls Club Foundation.

=== Politics ===
Morse was first elected to the Oregon State Senate in 2002, defeating Democrat Barbara Ross, a three-term member of the Oregon House of Representatives who had lost her seat due to the term limits then in effect. It was Morse's first run for political office. The race was one of six that year that were considered likely to affect party control of the Oregon Legislative Assembly, and that attracted hundreds of thousands of dollars in contributions. Ross and Morse raised a total of about $500,000, and were noted for eschewing negative advertising for most of the campaign.

Morse was reelected in 2006, defeating Democrat Mario Magana with 59% of the vote. He has served on the Joint Ways and Means Committee, the Emergency Board, the Public Commission on the Legislature, the Joint Information and Management Technology Committee, the Senate General Government Committee, and the Oregon Innovation and Technology Council.

In 2006, Morse delivered a speech on globalization, and specifically on Thomas Friedman's book The World Is Flat, to the Friends of the Albany Public Library. He was criticized for purchasing research for the speech from a firm in India that was cited as a primary source in Friedman's book.

In 2007, Morse proposed a comprehensive reform to Oregon's tax system, along with Democratic Senators Ben Westlund, Ryan Deckert, and Kurt Schrader. The plan, which would have included a sales tax, promised to raise more revenue while costing individual Oregon taxpayers less. It would have required a three-fifths supermajority in both houses of the Oregon Legislative Assembly. It did not pass.

The environmental Oregon League of Conservation Voters gave Morse's Senate votes a score of 0% in 2003, 17% in 2005, and 58% in 2007.

In 2008, the Oregon Legislative Assembly held an experimental session, to explore the possibility of holding annual sessions as a regular practice. Such a change would require an amendment to the Oregon Constitution. Senator Morse noted some successes of the experimental session, but advised that it would be more effective to shorten regular sessions in odd-numbered years, and lengthen supplemental sessions, such that sessions are closer in length.

Morse resigned halfway through his third term, and the county commissioners in his district appointed Betsy Close as his successor.

== Personal life ==
He and his wife, Linda, whom he married in 1965, have lived in Albany since 1972. They have two children and six grandchildren. They have attended First Christian Church for over 30 years. Morse has chaired the church's board and has served as an elder.

== Awards ==
Morse has received the OSU Family Business Award, OCCAPA Rocky Award, the Associated Oregon Industries Business Leader of the Year Award, and an honorary Doctor of Humanities Degree from Northwest Christian College.

== Electoral history ==
2006 Oregon State Senator, 8th district
Party	Candidate	Votes	%
Republican	Frank Morse	27,127	58.9
Democratic	Mario E. Magaña	18,767	40.8
Write-in		134	0.3
Total votes		46,028	100%

2010 Oregon State Senator, 8th district
Party	Candidate	Votes	%
Republican	Frank Morse	26,466	55.0
Democratic	Dan Rayfield	21,563	44.8
Write-in		123	0.3
Total votes		48,152	100%

== See also ==
- Politics of Oregon
