= Dayton High School =

Dayton High School may refer to:

- Dayton High School (Kentucky), Dayton, Kentucky
- Dayton High School (Nevada), Dayton, Nevada
- Dayton High School (Oregon), Dayton, Oregon
- Dayton High School (Texas), Dayton, Texas
- Dayton High School (Washington), Dayton, Washington
