= Mike Kopetski =

American politician (born 1949)

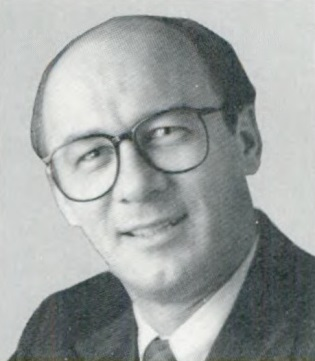

Member of the U.S. House of Representatives from Oregon's 5th district
- In office January 3, 1991 – January 3, 1995
- Preceded by: Denny Smith
- Succeeded by: Jim Bunn

Member of the Oregon House of Representatives from the 33rd district
- In office 1985–1988
- Preceded by: Peter Courtney
- Succeeded by: Peter Courtney

Personal details
- Born: Michael Joseph Kopetski; October 27, 1949 (age 77) Pendleton, Oregon, U.S.
- Party: Democratic
- Spouse: Frances Seymour
- Children: 1
- Education: American University (BA); Lewis and Clark College (JD)

Michael Joseph "Mike" Kopetski (born October 27, 1949, in Pendleton, Oregon) is an American lawyer, businessman, and former politician who served two terms as a member of the United States House of Representatives from 1991 to 1995.

== Early life and education ==
He earned his Bachelor of Arts from American University and Juris Doctor from Lewis & Clark Law School.

== Congress ==
He ran unsuccessfully for the United States House of Representatives in 1982, losing in the Democratic primary for Oregon's newly created 5th district. He ran again in 1988, this time winning the nomination. In the general election, he lost by a mere 707 votes to incumbent Denny Smith. In 1990, Kopetski ran against Smith again and defeated him, in part by tying Smith to the savings and loan crisis.

Kopetski served the 5th district from 1991 to 1995 and sat on the Ways and Means Committee. He did not seek reelection in 1994.

== Later career ==
After leaving Congress, Kopetski became an international trade consultant and currently serves on the board of On2 Technologies, in which he held a ten percent ownership interest until disposing of 50,000 of his 69,200 shares in September 2006.

He is a former Director General of the Center for International Forestry Research (CIFOR) in Indonesia.

He and his wife have lived in many countries.

U.S. House of Representatives
Preceded by Denny Smith	Member of the U.S. House of Representatives from Oregon's 5th congressional district 1991–1995	Succeeded by Jim Bunn
U.S. order of precedence (ceremonial)
Preceded by Alec G. Olson as Former U.S. Representative	Order of precedence of the United States as Former U.S. Representative	Succeeded by Jake LaTurner as Former U.S. Representative
