= Thomas Bunn =

Thomas Bunn may refer to:

- Thomas Bunn, Frome (1767–1853), English gentleman and philanthropist
- Thomas Bunn (Manitoba politician) (1830–1875), politician in Manitoba, Canada
- Tom Bunn (born c. 1959), politician in Oregon, U.S.A.
