= 1994 Oregon gubernatorial election =

- November 8, 1994
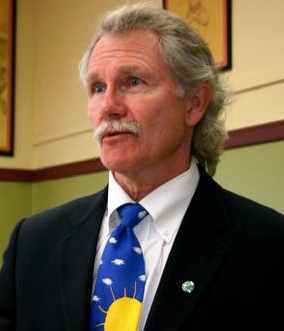

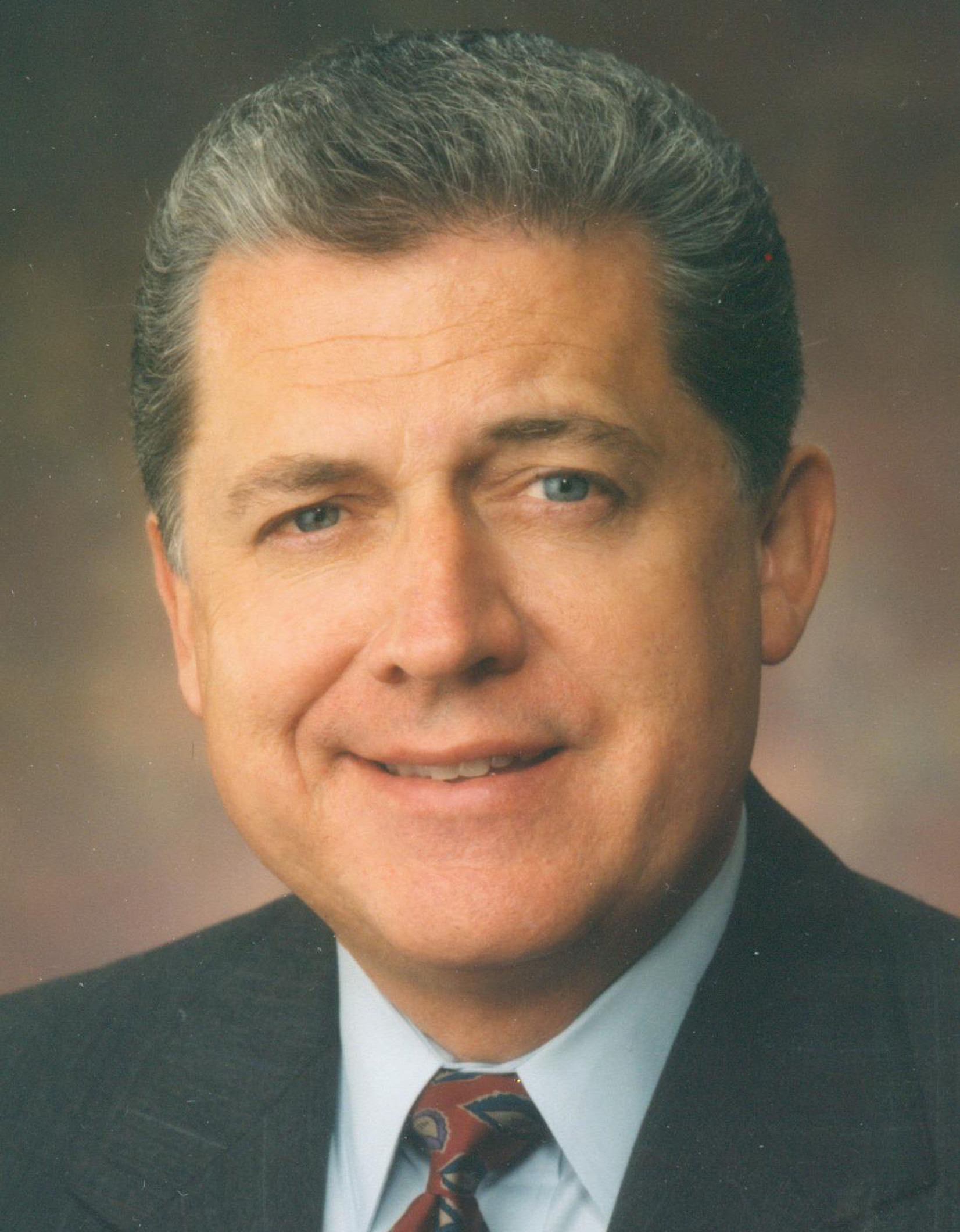
Nominee	John Kitzhaber	Denny Smith
Party	Democratic	Republican
Popular vote	622,083	517,874
Percentage	50.95%	42.41%
- County results Kitzhaber: 40–50% 50–60% 60–70% Smith: 40–50% 50–60% 60–70% 70–80%
Governor before election
Barbara Roberts
Democratic
Elected Governor
John Kitzhaber
Democratic

The 1994 Oregon gubernatorial election took place on November 3, 1994. Democratic nominee John Kitzhaber won the election, defeating Republican Denny Smith.

== Primary election ==
Oregon held primary elections on May 17, 1994.

=== Democratic party ===
==== Candidates ====
- John Kitzhaber, former member of Oregon State Senate
- Paul Damian Wells

==== Results ====
Democratic primary results
Party	Candidate	Votes	%
Democratic	John Kitzhaber	250,514	88.48%
Democratic	Paul Damian Wells	30,052	10.61%
Democratic	Scattering	2,570	0.91%
Total votes		283,136	100.00%

=== Republican party ===
==== Candidates ====
- Craig Berkman, businessman and former Chair of the Oregon Republican Party
- Jack Feder, businessman
- Donald Goff
- John E. Jewkes
- Bradford William Nudd
- Denny Smith, former representative from Oregon's 5th congressional district

==== Results ====
Republican primary results
Party	Candidate	Votes	%
Republican	Denny Smith	135,330	49.52%
Republican	Craig Berkman	110,821	40.55%
Republican	Jack Feder	15,055	5.51%
Republican	Donald Goff	5,200	1.90%
Republican	Bradford William Nudd	2,615	0.96%
Republican	John E. Jewkes	2,037	0.75%
Republican	Scattering	2,252	0.82%
Total votes		273,310	100.00%

== General election ==
=== Candidates ===
- John Kitzhaber, Democratic
- Denny Smith, Republican
- Ed Hickam, American
- Danford P. Vander Ploeg, Libertarian

=== Polling ===
Source	Date	John Kitzhaber (D)	Denny Smith (R)
KPTV	September 11, 1994	50%	29%

=== Results ===
1994 Oregon gubernatorial election
Party	Candidate	Votes	%	±%
Democratic	John Kitzhaber	622,083	50.95%	+5.23%
Republican	Denny Smith	517,874	42.41%	+2.46%
American	Ed Hickam	58,449	4.79%	
Libertarian	Danford P. Vander Ploeg	20,183	1.65%	+0.34%
Write-in	Mark Richanbach	92	0.01%	
Write-in	Ron Mellow	40	0.00%	
Write-in	"Mr. Bill" Spidal	39	0.00%	
Write-in	Richard Alevizos	24	0.00%	
Write-in	Scattering	2,226	0.18%	
Total votes		1,221,010	100.00%	
Majority		104,209	8.53%	
Democratic hold		Swing	+2.77%	

=== Results by county ===
County	John Kitzhaber Democratic		Denny Smith Republican		Ed Hickam American		Danford P. Vander Ploeg Libertarian		Scattering Write-in		Margin		Total votes cast
County	#	%	#	%	#	%	#	%	#	%	#	%	Total votes cast
Baker	3,608	44.39%	4,008	50.30%	247	3.04%	90	1.11%	95	1.17%	-480	-5.91%	8,128
Benton	19,047	59.49%	10,978	34.29%	1,233	3.85%	637	1.99%	122	0.38%	8,069	25.20%	32,017
Clackamas	65,454	50.68%	54,507	42.20%	7,187	5.56%	1,959	1.52%	42	0.03%	10,947	8.48%	129,149
Clatsop	7,623	55.17%	5,283	38.24%	669	4.84%	214	1.55%	28	0.20%	2,340	16.94%	13,817
Columbia	7,905	48.97%	6,683	41.40%	1,201	7.44%	309	1.91%	45	0.28%	1,222	7.57%	16,143
Coos	11,089	43.76%	12,479	49.25%	1,133	4.47%	522	2.06%	117	0.46%	-1,390	-5.49%	25,340
Crook	2,211	34.22%	3,785	58.57%	309	4.78%	117	1.81%	40	0.62%	-1,574	-24.36%	6,462
Curry	3,432	37.42%	5,236	57.09%	295	3.22%	184	2.01%	25	0.27%	-1,804	-19.67%	9,172
Deschutes	17,527	46.54%	18,067	47.98%	1,443	3.83%	562	1.49%	58	0.15%	-540	-1.43%	37,657
Douglas	14,7110	37.41%	22,396	56.96%	1,450	3.69%	643	1.64%	122	0.31%	-7,686	-19.55%	39,321
Gilliam	412	45.88%	442	49.22%	32	3.56%	12	1.34%	0	0.00%	-30	-3.34%	898
Grant	880	25.97%	2,336	68.95%	95	2.80%	45	1.33%	32	0.94%	-1,456	-42.98%	3,388
Harney	805	28.17%	1,910	66.83%	103	3.60%	30	1.05%	10	0.35%	-1,105	-38.66%	2,858
Hood River	3,339	49.31%	2,981	44.03%	353	5.21%	92	1.36%	6	0.09%	358	5.29%	6,771
Jackson	28,075	43.71%	32,914	51.24%	2,048	3.19%	1,165	1.81%	32	0.05%	-4,839	-7.53%	64,234
Jefferson	2,146	41.63%	2,639	51.19%	287	5.57%	74	1.44%	9	0.17%	-493	-9.56%	5,155
Josephine	9,993	36.67%	15,510	56.92%	1,076	3.95%	568	2.08%	102	0.37%	-5,517	-20.25%	27,249
Klamath	6,609	30.50%	13,805	63.72%	855	3.95%	322	1.49%	75	0.35%	-7,196	-33.21%	21,666
Lake	804	24.71%	2,308	70.93%	85	2.61%	39	1.20%	18	0.55%	-1,504	-46.22%	3,254
Lane	71,383	58.46%	42,166	34.53%	5,592	4.58%	2,805	2.30%	151	0.12%	29,217	23.93%	122,097
Lincoln	9,791	54.30%	6,869	38.10%	912	5.06%	449	2.49%	10	0.06%	2,922	16.21%	18,031
Linn	14,335	38.45%	19,687	52.80%	2,561	6.87%	682	1.83%	21	0.06%	-5,352	-14.35%	37,286
Malheur	1,824	21.79%	6,284	75.07%	159	1.90%	98	1.17%	6	0.07%	-4,460	-53.28%	8,371
Marion	43,779	45.21%	47,065	48.60%	4,427	4.57%	1,135	1.17%	430	0.44%	-3,286	-3.39%	96,836
Morrow	1,157	39.95%	1,530	52.83%	162	5.59%	43	1.48%	4	0.14%	-373	-12.88%	2,896
Multnomah	156,720	64.86%	68,005	28.14%	12,377	5.12%	3,865	1.60%	660	0.27%	88,715	36.72%	241,627
Polk	10,280	44.71%	11,424	49.69%	966	4.20%	311	1.35%	10	0.04%	-1,144	-4.98%	22,991
Sherman	411	42.81%	479	49.90%	50	5.21%	18	1.88%	2	0.21%	-68	-7.08%	960
Tillamook	5,199	51.95%	3,899	38.96%	742	7.41%	150	1.50%	18	0.18%	-1,300	-12.99%	10,008
Umatilla	7,189	38.97%	10,230	55.46%	808	4.38%	218	1.18%	2	0.01%	-3,041	-16.49%	18,447
Union	3,770	37.91%	5,602	56.34%	404	4.06%	163	1.64%	5	0.05%	-1,832	-18.42%	9,944
Wallowa	874	24.57%	2,520	70.85%	83	2.33%	49	1.38%	31	0.87%	-1,646	-46.27%	3,557
Wasco	4,692	50.74%	3,798	41.07%	613	6.63%	127	1.37%	17	0.18%	894	9.67%	9,247
Washington	72,747	52.79%	56,045	40.67%	6,874	4.99%	2,054	1.49%	74	0.05%	-16,702	-12.12%	137,794
Wheeler	215	29.53%	462	63.46%	32	4.40%	17	2.34%	2	0.27%	-247	-33.93%	728
Yamhill	12,048	43.79%	13,462	48.93%	1,586	5.76%	415	1.51%	0	0.00%	-1,414	-5.14%	27,511
Total	622,083	50.95%	517,874	42.41%	58,449	4.79%	20,183	1.65%	2,421	0.20%	104,209	8.53%	1,221,010

==== Counties that flipped from Republican to Democratic ====
- Columbia
- Hood River

==== Counties that flipped from Democratic to Republican ====
- Coos
- Yamhill
