= Kelley Wirth =

American politician

Member of the Oregon House of Representatives from the 16th district
- In office January 13, 2003 – November 15, 2005
- Preceded by: Jeff Merkley
- Succeeded by: Sara Gelser

Member of the Oregon House of Representatives from the 35th district
- In office January 3, 2001 – January 3, 2003
- Preceded by: Barbara Ross
- Succeeded by: Max Williams

Personal details
- Party: Democratic

Kelley Wirth is a former member of the house of representatives of the U.S. state of Oregon. She represented a District 35 (later renumbered as District 16 following the 2000 United States census), which included the city of Corvallis.

Wirth, a Democrat, was one of two Oregon lawmakers to resign during the 73rd Oregon Legislative Assembly due to separate personal issues; the other was Dan Doyle (R–Salem). She was indicted for unlawful possession of methamphetamine, and resigned from the legislature effective November 15, 2005. Wayne Krieger (R-Gold Beach) introduced a bill during the following session to institute mandatory drug testing for Oregon lawmakers, but stated the bill had nothing to do with Wirth.

Wirth was born in Panorama City, California. She graduated from Corvallis High School (Oregon), earned a Bachelor of Science in political science at Oregon State University and a Master of Science in systems management at the University of Southern California. She chaired the Corvallis Planning Commission and served on several other local commissions prior to being elected to the Oregon Legislative Assembly. She worked as a systems analyst while serving as a legislator. While in the legislature, she served as the Democratic floor leader, and as a member of the government efficiency committee and the stream and restoration and species recovery committee.

Wirth, who was first elected to the House in 2000, went through a divorce in 2003. She has two daughters.

== Electoral history ==
2004 Oregon State Representative, 16th district
Party	Candidate	Votes	%
Democratic	Kelley Wirth	17,832	62.3
Republican	Don Gist	9,933	34.7
Libertarian	Jared Ellefson	781	2.7
Write-in		89	0.3
Total votes		28,635	100%
