= Northwestern School of Law =

Northwestern School of Law may refer to:

- Northwestern School of Law of Lewis & Clark College, now known as Lewis & Clark Law School, in Portland, Oregon
- Northwestern University Pritzker School of Law, in Chicago, Illinois
