= H. Clay Myers Jr. =

American politician (1927-2004)

Clay Myers
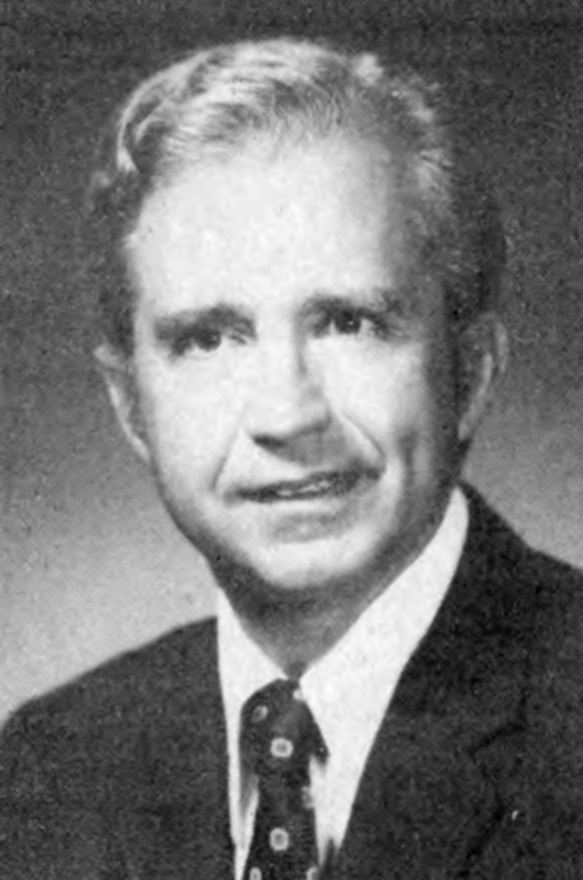

22nd Treasurer of Oregon
- In office January 3, 1977 – April 1, 1984
- Governor: Robert W. Straub; Victor Atiyeh
- Preceded by: James A. Redden
- Succeeded by: Bill Rutherford

19th Secretary of State of Oregon
- In office January 9, 1967 – January 3, 1977
- Governor: Tom McCall; Robert W. Straub
- Preceded by: Tom McCall
- Succeeded by: Norma Paulus

Personal details
- Born: May 27, 1927 Portland, Oregon, U.S.
- Died: October 29, 2004 (aged 77) Arizona, U.S.
- Party: Republican (Before 1999); Independent (1999-2003); Democratic (2003-2004)
- Spouse: Elizabeth Myers
- Children: 3

Henry Clay Myers Jr. (May 27, 1927 – October 29, 2004) was an American politician who, during his career, was considered one of Oregon's most influential moderate Republicans, together with his contemporaries, Tom McCall and Mark Hatfield.

== Early life ==
Born in Portland, Myers' childhood was spent in the coastal community of Tillamook, Oregon. He lived with his family briefly in Zimbabwe (known as Southern Rhodesia at the time) when he was 10 and in a 2004 interview with The Oregonian described it as "a mind-blowing experience." They lived miles from the nearest white family, and Myers said that he learned an enduring lesson in the futility of racism. ^{[1]}

A graduate of Portland's Benson High School (1945), Myers went on to the University of Oregon, where he founded the Zeta Omicron chapter of Lambda Chi Alpha (ZO 009), led the Young Republicans, and promoted student involvement in elections, campaigns and political issues. He studied law at Northwestern College of Law in Portland and attended the U.S. Coast Guard Academy in Connecticut.^{[1]}

Before entering politics, he pursued a business career in banking and insurance.

Myers and his wife Elizabeth had three children, Carolyn, David, and Richard Clay.

== Political career ==
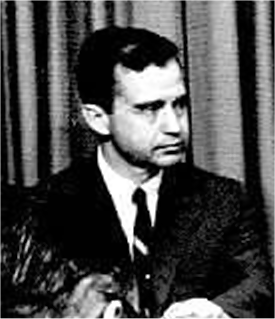
Clay Myers at a 1968 news conference

Myers' first held office as Oregon Secretary of State, being appointed to that post in 1967 by Tom McCall who had vacated the office to become governor. Myers had been a staff member on the McCall gubernatorial campaign. He was elected to the office in 1968, and re-elected in 1972. In 1974, he was defeated in a bid for the Republican nomination for Governor by Vic Atiyeh, whom he had previously recruited to run for the state legislature. Term limits prevented his running for reelection in 1976, so he entered and won the race for State Treasurer. He served seven years in that office, to complete an exceptional eighteen years in continuous service in statewide public office.

== Latter years ==
After leaving office, Myers returned to the business world, joining J.P. Morgan Investment Management in New York. He retired in 1989, and returned to Oregon, where he remained active in community and church affairs.

Health problems, including a lengthy battle with cancer, prompted his move in 1999 to Tubac, Arizona.

Long disenchanted with the rising social conservatism of the Republican Party, Myers announced in 1999 that he had registered as an independent, turning the tables on a quotation of Ronald Reagan by saying at the time, "I didn't leave the party. The party left me." In 2003, he registered as a Democrat in support of Howard Dean's primary campaign, later actively working to elect John Kerry.

He died of cancer on October 29, 2004, in his Arizona home.

== Legacy ==
Myers was deeply involved in public policy, as a Republican Party leader, a statewide office holder, and finally, as elder statesman. He is remembered for his work on some of Oregon's most innovative initiatives in land use planning, environmental and transportation policies and legislation. After his death, he was honored in a joint resolution of the Oregon State Legislature as "a gentle but tenacious leader who cared deeply about making Oregon a more livable and just place, and whose strong faith and unwavering efforts helped make Oregon a national model."

Preceded by James A. Redden	Oregon State Treasurer; 1977–1984	Succeeded by Bill Rutherford
Preceded by Tom McCall	Secretary of State of Oregon; 1967–1977	Succeeded by Norma Paulus
