= 2004 Oregon Secretary of State election =

- November 2, 2004
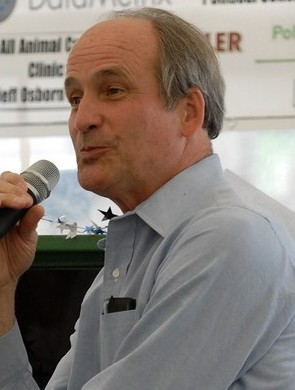

Nominee	Bill Bradbury	Betsy Close
Party	Democratic	Republican
Popular vote	1,002,052	690,228
Percentage	57.2%	39.4%
- County results Bradbury: 40–50% 50–60% 60–70% 70–80% Close: 40–50% 50–60% 60–70%
Secretary of State before election
Bill Bradbury
Democratic
Elected Secretary of State
Bill Bradbury
Democratic

The 2004 Oregon Secretary of State election was held on November 2, 2004, to elect the Oregon Secretary of State. Democratic incumbent Bill Bradbury won re-election, defeating Republican state representative Betsy Close.

== Democratic primary ==
=== Candidates ===
- Bill Bradbury, incumbent secretary of state
- Paul Damian Wells, electrical engineer

=== Results ===
Democratic Primary results
Party	Candidate	Votes	%
Democratic	Bill Bradbury	311,602	87.86
Democratic	Paul Damian Wells	41,196	11.61
Democratic	write-ins	1,839	0.51
Total votes		354,637	100

== Republican primary ==
=== Candidates ===
- Fred Granum, attorney
- Betsy Close, state representative

=== Results ===
Republican Primary results
Party	Candidate	Votes	%
Republican	Betsy Close	144,001	53.17
Republican	Fred Granum	124,072	45.81
Republican	write-ins	2,748	1.01
Total votes		270,821	100

== Other candidates ==
- Richard Morley (Libertarian), college professor

== Results ==
2004 Secretary of State general election
Party	Candidate	Votes	%
Democratic	Bill Bradbury	1,002,052	57.2
Republican	Betsy L. Close	690,228	39.4
Libertarian	Richard Morley	56,678	3.2
Write-in		3,871	0.2
Total votes		1,752,829	100%
