= Justice Bunn =

Justice Bunn may refer to:

- C. Haley Bunn (born 1985/86), associate justice of the Supreme Court of Appeals of West Virginia
- George Bunn (lawyer) (1865–1918), associate justice of the Minnesota Supreme Court
- Henry Gaston Bunn (1838–1908), chief justice of the Arkansas Supreme Court
