= George Bunn =

George Bunn may refer to:

- George Bunn (lawyer) (1865–1918), American lawyer, judge, and academic from Minnesota
- George Bunn (diplomat) (1925–2013), American diplomat, lawyer, and nonproliferation expert
- George R. Bunn Jr., the founder of Bunn-O-Matic Corporation
