= Robin Kundis Craig =

American lawyer and academic

Robin Kundis Craig is an American lawyer and academic, who is currently a professor at the University of Utah's S.J. Quinney College of Law. A leading environmental law scholar and commentator on coastal issues, she served as a member of the United States National Research Council's committee assessing the Clean Water Act's regulations of the Mississippi River.

Craig earned her Juris Doctor from Lewis & Clark Law School in Portland, Oregon. From 2005 to 2012, she was the Attorneys' Title Insurance Fund Professor at Florida State University College of Law. She also served as a tenured professor at the Robert H. McKinney School of Law at Indiana University.
