= Bill Rutherford (politician) =

American politician (born 1939)

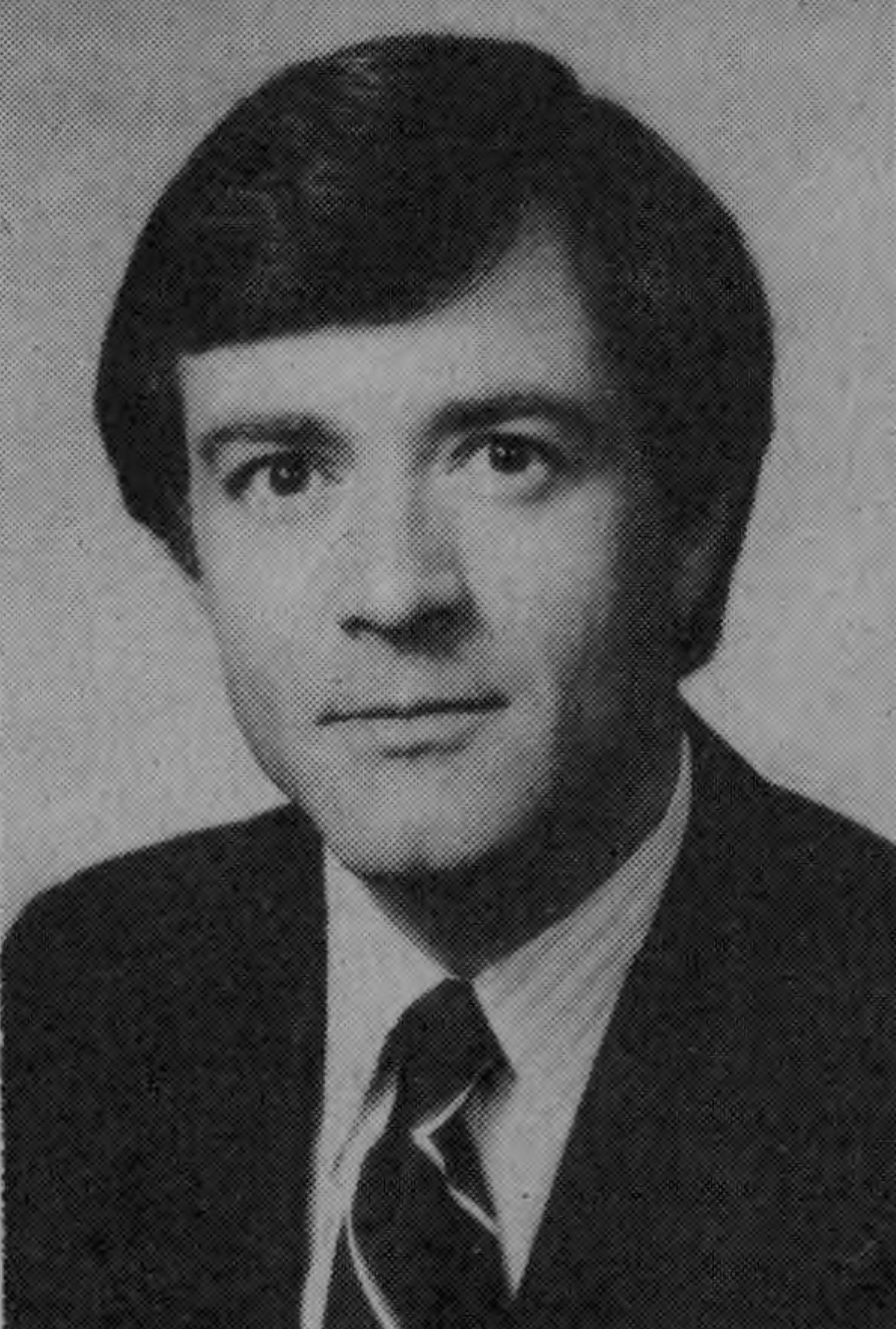

Oregon State Treasurer
- In office April 1, 1984 – July 9, 1987
- Governor: Victor Atiyeh; Neil Goldschmidt
- Preceded by: H. Clay Myers, Jr.
- Succeeded by: Tony Meeker

Member of the Oregon House of Representatives from the 29th district
- In office January 10, 1977 – April 1, 1984
- Preceded by: Stan Bunn
- Succeeded by: Stan Bunn

Personal details
- Born: January 14, 1939 (age 87) Marshalltown, Iowa, U.S.
- Party: Republican
- Spouse: Karen Klok Anderegg (m. 1994–2010)
- Education: University of Oregon; Harvard Law School

William D. Rutherford (born January 14, 1939) is an American Republican politician who served as Oregon State Treasurer from 1984 until 1987.

== Early life ==
Born in Iowa, Rutherford moved to McMinnville, Oregon as a child. He attended the University of Oregon and Harvard Law School, and joined the United States Army, serving for two years, where he became a first lieutenant.

== Career ==
Rutherford initially practiced law in Portland, but moved back to McMinnville, where he served as president of the local chamber of commerce. He was elected to the Oregon House of Representatives from 1977 until 1984, representing parts of Yamhill and Marion counties. Rutherford was appointed State Treasurer by Governor Victor Atiyeh in order to fill a vacancy caused by the resignation of H. Clay Myers, Jr. in 1984, subsequently winning election to the office. He resigned in 1987 in order to head an investment company in New York City. Rutherford moved back to Oregon in 1993 and currently heads his own investment company known as Rutherford Investment Management, which he founded in 1994.

== Personal life ==
While living in New York City, Rutherford met Karen Klok Anderegg (1940–2010), a business executive. They married on January 2, 1994, and she died in December 2010.

Political offices
Preceded by Clay Myers	Treasurer of Oregon; 1984–1987	Succeeded by Tony Meeker
