= Max Williams (politician) =

American politician

Director of Oregon Department of Corrections
- In office 2004–2011
- Governor: Ted Kulongoski, John Kitzhaber
- Succeeded by: Mitch Morrow (interim)

Member of the Oregon House of Representatives from the 35th, 9th district
- In office January 11, 1999 – January 10, 2005
- Preceded by: Tom Brian
- Succeeded by: Larry Galizio

Personal details
- Born: 1963 (age 62–63)
- Party: Republican
- Spouse: Gina
- Children: 3

Max Williams is an American politician who served as a member of the Oregon House of Representatives and as director of the Oregon Department of Corrections. He began public service in the 70th Oregon Legislative Assembly, representing Tigard's 9th district. He was redistricted into the 35th district in the 72nd Oregon Legislative Assembly, which would be his last term as a legislator. He served for 8 years as the director of the Oregon Department of Corrections.

== Education ==
Williams graduated from Brigham Young University in 1987 and Northwestern School of Law of Lewis & Clark College in 1991.

== Career ==
=== Lawyer ===
Williams worked for Miller Nash as a trial lawyer from 1991 to 2003 working in real estate, securities, and business law.

=== Legislature ===
Williams served 3 terms in the Oregon House of Representatives, in 2003 chairing the House Judiciary committee. He also worked to review public safety agencies, including the corrections department.

=== Department of Corrections ===
Williams worked for 8 years as director of the Oregon DOC. He described himself as "smart on crime", a play on tough on crime. He prioritized mental health care rather than punishment in his activities as director, opening a mental hospital in the Oregon State Penitentiary. His initial appointment was regarded with apprehension due to his political past, but was regarded as very competent and intelligent by corrections officers.

=== Oregon Community Foundation ===
Williams worked as president and CEO of the Oregon Community Foundation charity for from 2012 to 2022, being succeeded by Lisa Mensah. As president of OCF, Williams worked on "Project Turnkey", which allocated beds to people affected by the 2020 Oregon wildfires. He also helped create the Oregon Impact Fund, which lends money to nonprofits.
