= Andy Olson =

American politician

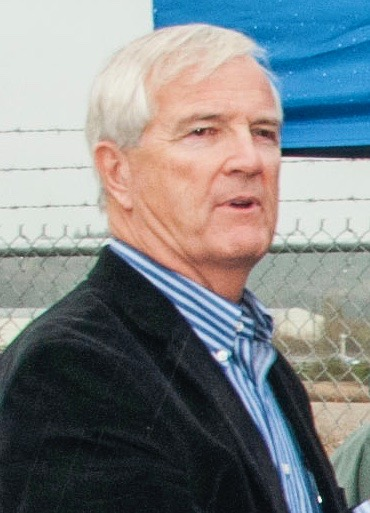

Member of the Oregon House of Representatives from the 15th district
- In office 2005–2019
- Preceded by: Betsy Close
- Succeeded by: Shelly Boshart Davis

Personal details
- Born: November 6, 1952 (age 73) Norfolk, Nebraska, U.S.
- Party: Republican
- Profession: Police officer (retired)
- Website: Legislative website

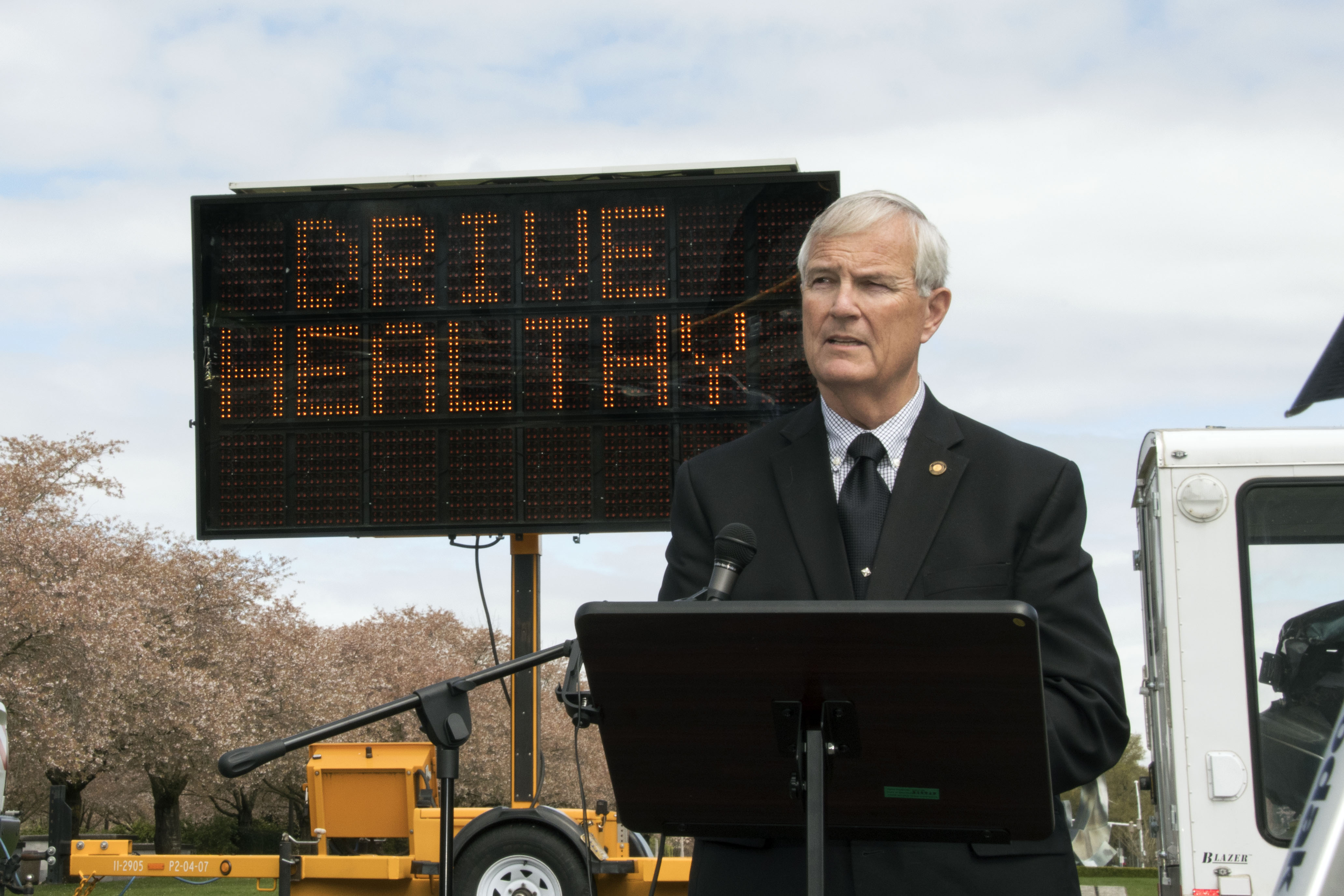
Olson speaking in 2017

Andy Olson (born November 6, 1952) is a Republican politician from the U.S. state of Oregon. He served in the Oregon House of Representatives for District 15, representing parts of Linn and Benton counties, including the city of Albany. Olson served as co-speaker pro tempore in the 76th Oregon Legislative Assembly with Democrat Tina Kotek due to a power-sharing arrangement in the evenly divided Oregon House.

== Early life and career ==
Olson was born in Norfolk, Nebraska. He earned an Associate of Arts in Law Enforcement from Chemeketa Community College and a BA in Human Resources Management from George Fox University. In 1978, Olson became an Oregon State Police Officer and was stationed all over the state, eventually serving as Lieutenant and Station Commander in Albany, McMinnville, and Beaverton. He retired from the state police in 2007. Olson continues to teach public safety with a focus on leadership and character at Linn–Benton Community College.

== Political career ==
In 2004, incumbent Republican Betsy Close announced that she would not seek re-election in district 15, while simultaneously endorsing Olson as her successor. Olson defeated Democrat Wes Price to win election in November and has since been re-elected six times.

In February 2018, Olson announced that he would not seek another term in office and that he would retire as of the end of the current term in January 2019. Including his 30 years with the Oregon State Police, Olson devoted almost 44 years to public service.

== Personal life ==
Olson and his wife Pam have three children and live in Albany.

== Electoral history ==
2004 Oregon State Representative, 15th district
Party	Candidate	Votes	%
Republican	Andy Olson	18,480	61.2
Democratic	Wesley B. Price	11,685	38.7
Write-in		47	0.2
Total votes		30,212	100%

2006 Oregon State Representative, 15th district
Party	Candidate	Votes	%
Republican	Andy Olson	16,317	68.0
Democratic	Sam H.W. Sappington	7,634	31.8
Write-in		47	0.2
Total votes		23,998	100%

2008 Oregon State Representative, 15th district
Party	Candidate	Votes	%
Republican	Andy Olson	18,808	63.0
Democratic	Dick Olsen	10,971	36.8
Write-in		60	0.2
Total votes		29,839	100%

2010 Oregon State Representative, 15th district
Party	Candidate	Votes	%
Republican	Andy Olson	17,033	68.2
Democratic	Bud Laurent	7,901	31.6
Write-in		51	0.2
Total votes		24,985	100%

2012 Oregon State Representative, 15th district
Party	Candidate	Votes	%
Republican	Andy Olson	17,977	66.4
Democratic	Ron Green	9,046	33.4
Write-in		57	0.2
Total votes		27,080	100%

2014 Oregon State Representative, 15th district
Party	Candidate	Votes	%
Republican	Andy Olson	19,048	97.7
Write-in		451	2.3
Total votes		19,499	100%

2016 Oregon State Representative, 15th district
Party	Candidate	Votes	%
Republican	Andy Olson	25,175	82.8
Progressive	Cynthia Hyatt	5,051	16.6
Write-in		163	0.5
Total votes		30,389	100%
