= Craig Berkman =

American businessman

Chair of the Oregon Republican Party
- In office 1989–1993

Personal details
- Born: Craig Lamont Willoughby; August 12, 1941 (age 85) Sioux City, Iowa, United States
- Spouses: Susan; Karen Hinsdale (until 2002); Mary Ann Farrell Karlsson (until 2017)
- Children: two daughters with Susan
- Education: McDaniel High School; Wheaton College; University of California, Berkeley; Lewis & Clark Law School

Craig L. Berkman (born August 12, 1941) is an American venture capitalist and a Republican politician in the U.S. state of Oregon. He was known as a major donor in national Republican circles. He chaired the Oregon Republican Party in the early 1990s, opposing the far right Oregon Citizens Alliance. He ran for chairman of the Republican National Committee in 1993 and for Governor of Oregon in 1994, losing the former race to Haley Barbour and the latter to Denny Smith in the primary election.

Berkman served as Oregon's state Republican Party chairman from 1989 to 1993 and ran unsuccessfully for the Republican nomination for Governor of Oregon in 1994.

He was arrested in March 2013 in the Tampa, Florida suburb of Odessa, where he has a $3.94 million home, on charges of selling pre-IPO shares of Facebook.

In June 2013, Berkman pleaded guilty to securities and wire fraud at the United States District Court for the Southern District of New York in Manhattan. On December 16, 2013, he was sentenced to 6 years in prison, and will be required to repay $8.4 million to investors.

== Early life and education ==
Craig Berkman was born Craig Lamont Willoughby in Sioux City, Iowa. His biological father was Roford "Pinky" Berkman. Craig Berkman was raised poor in the Roseway neighborhood of Portland, Oregon. As Craig Berkman, he graduated from Madison High School, went to Wheaton College in Illinois on a scholarship and later earned graduate degrees from University of California, Berkeley and Lewis & Clark Law School. Berkman was a trustee of Lewis & Clark College.

== Work history ==
In 1971, Berkman worked for a brief period on the staff of Portland city commissioner (council member) Connie McCready. He was elected in 1978 to the Metropolitan Service District's council, in Portland, where fellow councillors named him chairman, and served from 1979 to 1981. He quit in 1981 after his business interests began taking so much time that he had been missing more than half of the council meetings.

Berkman was chairman of the Oregon Republican Party from 1989–1993. He was chairman of high-technology and medical equipment companies. He worked as an administrative aide at his alma mater Lewis & Clark College.

== Criminal history ==
Berkman was sentenced to six years in prison for a scheme that cost investors $16 million in investments.

== Personal life ==
Berkman was married to Susan Woodward. They had two daughters.

Berkman was married to Karen Hinsdale-Berkman, who is the owner of wine shop The Cellar Door, on the board of directors of Self Enhancement Inc., and secretary of the Oregon Republican Foundation. Their divorce was settled in 2002.

Berkman was married to Mary Ann Farrell Karlsson (also known as Mary Ann Karlsson-Berkman), a former New York Miss America contestant. Their divorce was pronounced in 2017.

== Honors and awards ==
Berkman and his wife Karen Hinsdale-Berkman were awarded the University Advancement Award for the 2000–2001 year by the Portland State University Alumni Association.
