= Lou Savage =

American lawyer

Lou Savage was the Oregon Insurance Commissioner, appointed to that position on May 30, 2012 and resigning on July 15, 2013.

== Early career ==
Savage earned his undergraduate degree from the University of Oregon and a law degree from Lewis & Clark Law School. He worked for Multnomah County Legal Aid Services for more than a decade and a half and spent eight years as its executive director. He was also state director for then-U. S. Representative Ron Wyden's congressional office. He was president of the Oregon Law Center from 2002 until 2012. Also in 2002, he began working for the Oregon Insurance Division as a senior policy advisor.

== Insurance commissioner ==
Previously directing the Department of Consumer and Business Services legislative activities, Savage was appointed interim Oregon Insurance Commissioner in October 2011, and May 30, 2012, was named permanently to the post of Insurance Commissioner by Oregon Department of Consumer and Business Services director Patrick Allen.

He named the regulation and reform of health insurance as one of the top priorities of his administration.

Savage resigned as Oregon Insurance Commissioner effective July 15, 2013 to support legal reform in developing nations. He was replaced by Laura Cali.
