= Sara Gelser Blouin =

American politician (born 1973)

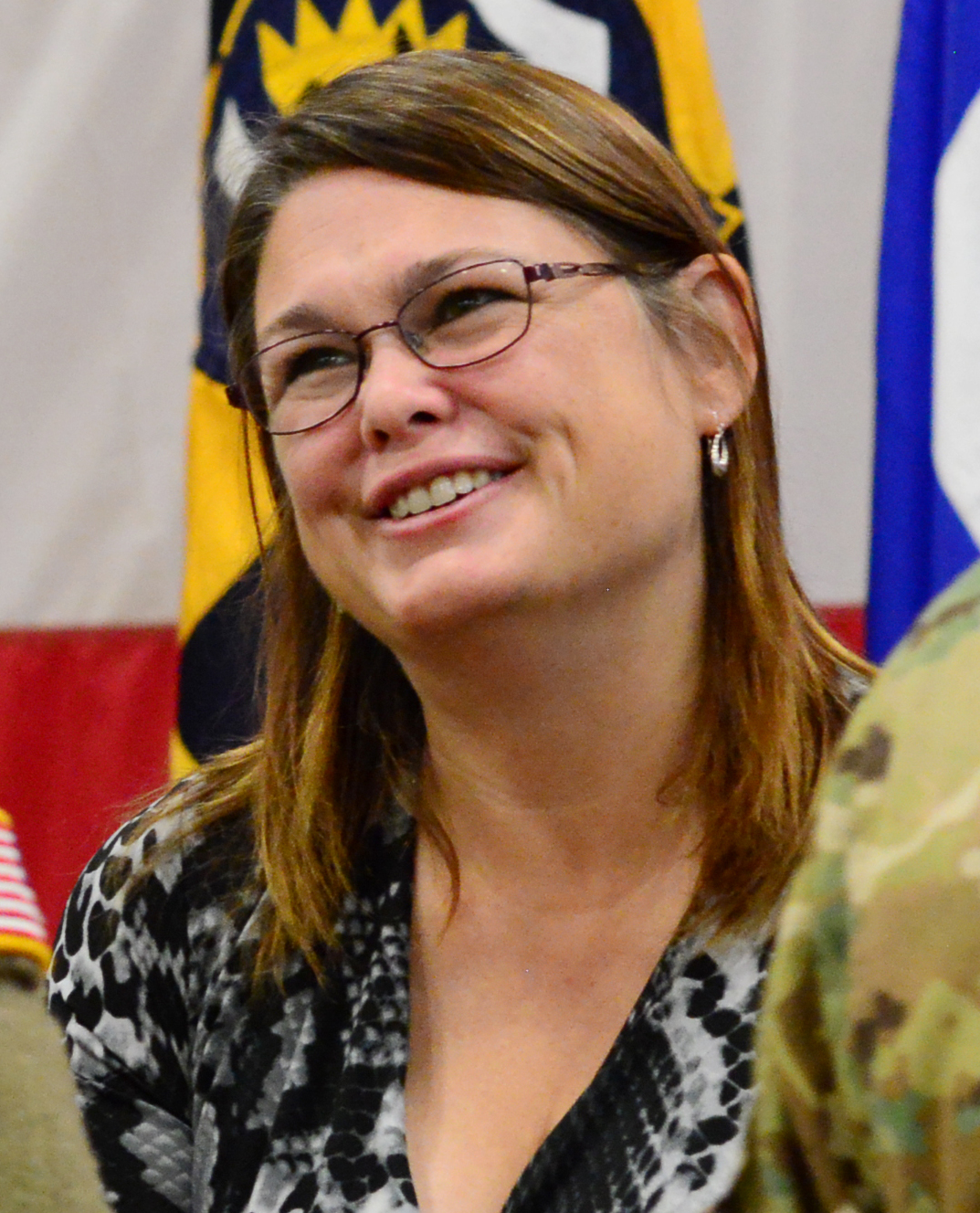

Member of the Oregon State Senate from the 8th district
- Incumbent
- Assumed office January 2015
- Preceded by: Betsy Close

Member of the Oregon House of Representatives from the 16th district
- In office December 2, 2005 – January 2015
- Preceded by: Kelley Wirth
- Succeeded by: Dan Rayfield

Personal details
- Born: December 20, 1973 (age 52) Las Vegas, Nevada, U.S.
- Party: Democratic
- Spouse: Michael Blouin (m. 2021)
- Children: 4
- Education: Earlham College (BA); Oregon State University (MA)

Sara Gelser Blouin (born December 20, 1973) is an American politician from Oregon. She is a member of the Democratic Party. She has represented District 8 in the Oregon State Senate since January 2015. From 2005 to 2015 she represented District 16 in the Oregon House of Representatives. Before entering the legislature she served on the Corvallis School Board and worked for the Oregon Department of Human Services.

In 2017, she was among the people featured in Time's "The Silence Breakers" Person of the Year issue, after she and another senator accused fellow senator Jeff Kruse of harassment.

== Early life and education ==
Gelser Blouin was born Sara Anne Acres was born in Las Vegas, Nevada. She earned a BA in history from Earlham College in 1994. She moved to Corvallis, Oregon in 1994. In 1999, she earned a master's degree in Interdisciplinary Studies from Oregon State University.

While at Earlham, she married Peter Gelser in 1993. They had four children together and remained married until 2017.

In July 2021, she married Dr. Michael Blouin, a professor of biology at Oregon State University, and changed her legal name became Sara Gelser Blouin.

== Legislative career ==
=== Oregon State House of Representatives ===
Gelser Blouin first ran for the House in 2004, and lost to the incumbent representative Kelley Wirth. When Wirth resigned in 2005, Gelser Blouin was appointed to the seat, and re-elected four times. She chaired the House Education Committee in 2009 and 2013 and was co-chair in 2011. She served as Assistant Caucus Leader from 2006 to 2011 and as Deputy Democratic Whip in 2011, co-chaired the Oregon Women's Health and Wellness Alliance, and was a founding member of the Seniors and Disabilities Caucus.

=== National Council on Disability ===
In December 2009, President Barack Obama announced his intent to nominate Gelser Blouin to the National Council on Disability. She was confirmed by the United States Senate and joined the council in 2010. Obama announced his intent to nominate her for a further term in November 2011. In 2011, she was also a Marshall Memorial Fellow of the German Marshall Fund.

=== Oregon State Senate ===
In September 2013, Gelser Blouin announced her candidacy for Senate District 8, which was held by Republican Betsy Close. In November 2014. She took office in January 2015 and was re-elected in 2018 and 2022.

Gelser Blouin chaired the Senate Committee on Human Services, including in 2019 and 2025.

In 2020, a former member of Gelser Blouin's staff alleged that Gelser Blouin had retaliated against her. After an outside investigation, a legislative conduct committee cleared Gelser Blouin in October 2020.

In 2026, Gelser Blouin carried Senate Bill 1551, which voids homeowners-association and planned-community rules that bar residents from using fire-hardened building materials.

== Kruse Complaint ==
In the fall of 2017, Gelser Blouin publicly accused Republican state senator Jeff Kruse of sexual harassment. Senate President Peter Courtney removed Kruse from his committee assignments in October 2017 over complaints about his behavior. In November 2017, Gelser Blouin and Senator Elizabeth Steiner filed formal complaints. An independent investigator hired by the Legislature concluded in a report released February 6, 2018, that Kruse had engaged in a pattern of unwelcome physical contact toward women in the workplace, including both senators. Kruse denied the allegations and announced his resignation on February 8, 2018, effective March 15.

In December 2017, Time named "The Silence Breakers" its Person of the Year. Gelser Blouin was among those featured in the cover story.

In a January 2019 report on workplace harassment at the Capitol, the state labor bureau's investigation included Gelser Blouin's account that she felt marginalized by how legislative leaders responded to her complaint.
