= Dante Rosario =

American football player (born 1984)

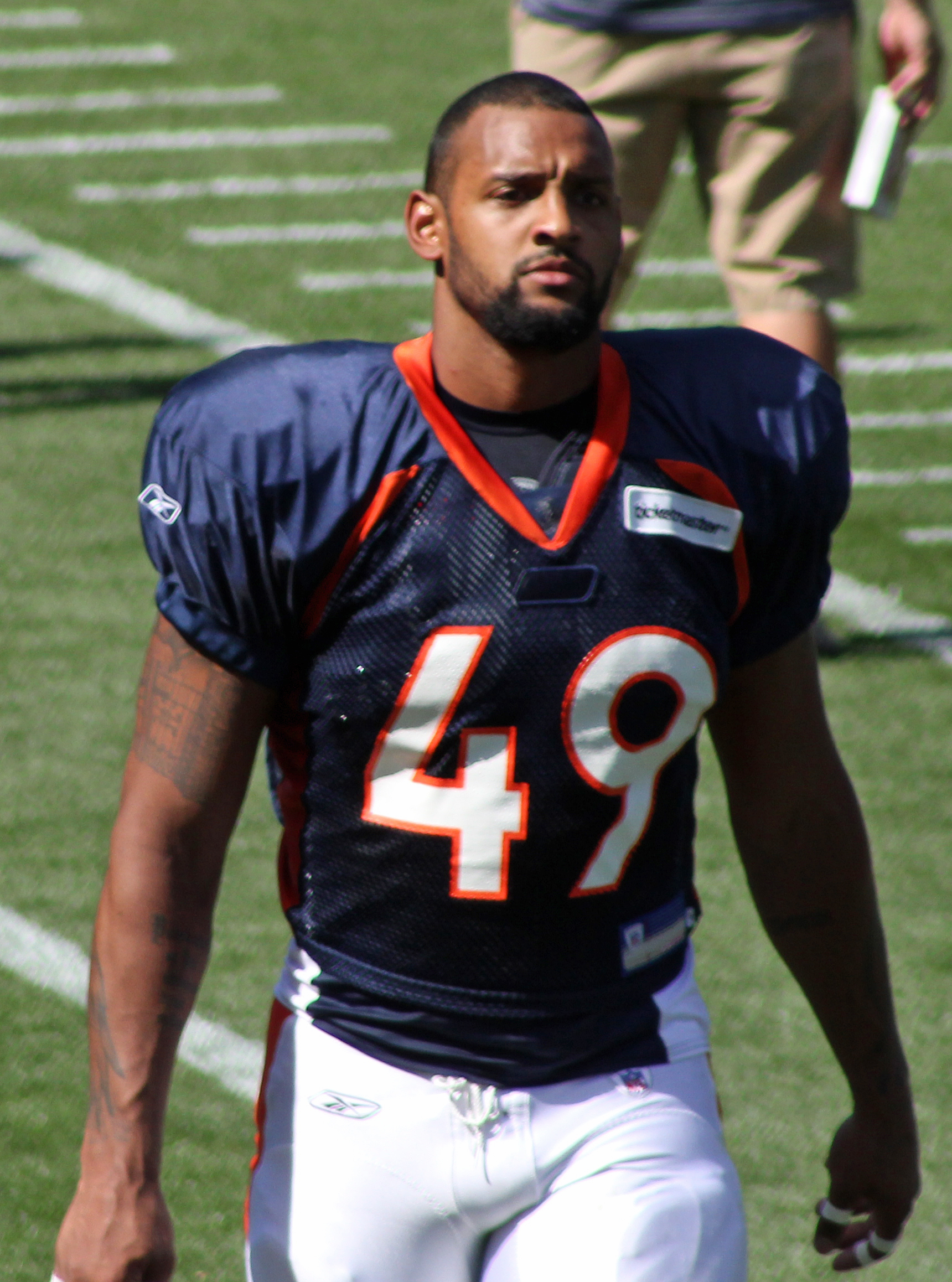
- Rosario with the Denver Broncos in 2011

No. 49, 81, 88
- Position: Tight end

Personal information
- Born: October 25, 1984 (age 42); Dayton, Oregon, U.S.
- Listed height: 6 ft 3 in (1.91 m)
- Listed weight: 244 lb (111 kg)

Career information
- High school: Dayton
- College: Oregon (2003–2006)
- NFL draft: 2007: 5th round, 155th overall pick

Career history
- Carolina Panthers (2007–2010); Denver Broncos (2011)*; Miami Dolphins (2011); Denver Broncos (2011); San Diego Chargers (2012); Dallas Cowboys (2013)*; Chicago Bears (2013–2014)
- * Offseason or practice squad member only

Career NFL statistics
- Receptions: 116
- Receiving yards: 1,235
- Receiving touchdowns: 8
- Stats at Pro Football Reference

Dante Santiago Rosario (born October 25, 1984) is an American former professional football player who was a tight end in the National Football League (NFL). He was selected by the Carolina Panthers in the fifth round of the 2007 NFL draft. He played college football for the Oregon Ducks.

He was also a member of the Miami Dolphins, Denver Broncos, San Diego Chargers, Dallas Cowboys, and Chicago Bears.

== Early life ==
Rosario attended Dayton High School in Dayton, Oregon. His father is Dominican and his mother is from Oregon. In his senior high school season, Rosario was named the 2002 Oregon 2A state defensive player of the year, and earned first-team all-state honors on both offense and defense in 2002 while leading the Pirates to the state 2A title. In a 45-20 victory against Amity in the 2002 2A state title game, Rosario rushed for 126 yards and four touchdowns on 22 carries. He was ranked as the No. 6 linebacker on the West Coast by SuperPrep after posting 144 tackles (75 unassisted), three quarterback sacks, and five interceptions as a free safety/middle linebacker. He returned three of those interceptions for touchdowns. On offense Rosario racked up 1,238 yards and 27 touchdowns rushing, plus two more touchdowns on punt returns. The 6-foot-4 Rosario also played center for the school’s two-time defending state basketball champions. As a junior, he was named first-team all-tournament after averaging 13.5 points and 8.8 rebounds in leading Dayton to its second straight state championship. Rosario also was a competitor on his high school track and field team.

== College career ==
In 49 games at the University of Oregon, Rosario recorded 94 receptions for 1,003 yards and 11 touchdowns. He also rushed for 84 yards and two touchdowns on 27 carries. Rosario played four different positions for the Ducks - halfback, H-back, fullback and tight end - and also was a special teams star for Oregon.

Rosario began his collegiate career at Oregon in 2003 and played H-back after being recruited primarily as a linebacker. He started three games as a freshman and made 12 catches for 131 yards and two touchdowns, and rushed for 55 yards and one touchdown on 17 carries.

In his sophomore season (2004), Rosario was shifted to fullback from H-back, and caught 25 passes for 278 yards and six touchdowns. He also rushed for 29 yards and a touchdown in 10 carries.

In 2005, Rosario's junior season, he moved to tight end from fullback, and caught 15 passes for 168 yards and two touchdowns. He also record 11 tackles, one forced fumble and one fumble recovery on special teams.

As a senior in 2006, Rosario was named as an All-Pac-10 honorable mention selection after making 42 receptions, a school single-season record for tight ends, for 426 yards and one touchdown. He was the co-recipient of the Gordon Wilson Award, given to Oregon's top special teams player, after recording ten tackles and one forced fumble.

== Professional career ==
=== Carolina Panthers ===
Rosario was chosen by Carolina Panthers in the fifth round (155th overall) of the 2007 NFL draft. As a rookie in 2007, he caught six passes for 108 yards (an 18.0 per-catch average) and two touchdowns. Rosario became just the third player in Carolina history to score a touchdown on first career NFL reception when he caught a five-yard pass from quarterback, Vinny Testaverde against the San Francisco 49ers on December 2, 2007. Rosario also returned two kickoffs for 39 yards (a 19.5 average).

In the Panthers' 2008 season opener against the Chargers on September 7, Rosario overcame double coverage to catch a 14-yard touchdown pass in the back of the end zone as time expired, to give Carolina a 26-24 victory against the heavily favored San Diego Chargers. It is considered to be one of the most memorable catches in Carolina Panther history. When the game ended, Fox's final statistics leaderboard for the game mistakenly displayed the name of actress Rosario Dawson. He finished the 2008 season with 18 catches for 209 yards and 1 touchdown. He started 22 games for the Panthers over four seasons, but only 6 in 2010. He was felt to be expendable after the signing of free agent Jeremy Shockey in March 2011.

=== Miami Dolphins ===
The Miami Dolphins signed Rosario on September 5, 2011. He was released on September 20.

=== Denver Broncos ===
Rosario was reunited with his former coach John Fox when he signed with the Denver Broncos in July 2011. He was released after the 2011 preseason due to the emergence of rookie tight ends Julius Thomas and Virgil Green. Rosario was re-signed by the Broncos on September 22, 2011.

=== San Diego Chargers ===
On March 19, 2012, Rosario was signed by the San Diego Chargers. He knocked Shane Lechler's punt down in week 1.

=== Dallas Cowboys ===
On June 3, 2013, Rosario signed with the Dallas Cowboys. He couldn't pass James Hanna on the depth chart during preseason.

=== Chicago Bears ===
On September 2, 2013, Rosario was traded to the Chicago Bears for a conditional seventh-round draft pick (#229-Nate Freese) in the 2014 NFL draft. On February 27, 2014, he and the Bears agreed to terms on a one-year contract throughout the 2014 season. He was released on March 10, 2014, eleven days after signing a new deal; he re-signed on March 13, 2014. On September 5, 2015, he was released by the Bears.

== Personal life ==
Rosario's mother, Yvonne (who died from cancer when Dante was a junior in high school), was a volleyball player at Oregon State University, and his father, Pedro Beltran, formerly pitched in the Atlanta Braves' organization. His younger brother, Sergio, was a basketball player at Linfield College in Oregon. He also has sister, Angela, who lives in Oregon.
