= Oregon's 15th House district =

Legislative district in the state of Oregon

Oregon's 15th House district after redistricting after the 2020 Census

District 15 of the Oregon House of Representatives is one of 60 House legislative districts in the state of Oregon. As of 2021, the boundary for the district includes portions of Benton, Marion, and Linn counties and is centered around Albany. The current representative for the district is Republican Shelly Boshart Davis of Albany.

== Election results ==
District boundaries have changed over time. Therefore, representatives before 2021 may not represent the same constituency as today. General election results from 2000 to present are as follows:

Year	Candidate	Party	Percent	Opponent	Party	Percent	Opponent	Party	Percent	Write-in percentage
2000	Steve March	Democratic	74.70%	Scott Lutz	Republican	25.30%	No third candidate			
2002 (Note: Betsy Close was the incumbent in this election. She previously represented District 36, but was moved to this district due to redistricting following the 2000 United States census.)	Betsy Close	Republican	51.85%	Joseph Novak	Democratic	47.98%	No third candidate			0.17%
2004	Andy Olson	Republican	61.37%	Wesley Price	Democratic	38.63%	No third candidate			
2006	Andy Olson	Republican	67.98%	Sam Sappington	Democratic	31.79%	No third candidate			0.23%
2008	Andy Olson	Republican	63.03%	Dick Olsen	Democratic	36.77%	No third candidate			0.20%
2010	Andy Olson	Republican	68.36%	Bud Laurent	Democratic	31.44%	No third candidate			0.20%
2012	Andy Olson	Republican	66.38%	Ron Green	Democratic	33.40%	No third candidate			0.21%
2014	Andy Olson	Republican	97.69%	Unopposed						2.31%
2016	Andy Olson	Republican	82.84%	Cynthia Hyatt	Progressive	16.62%	No third candidate			0.54%
2018	Shelly Boshart Davis	Republican	56.30%	Jerred Taylor	Democratic	38.62%	Cynthia Hyatt	Independent	4.96%	0.13%
2020	Shelly Boshart Davis	Republican	59.72%	Miriam Cummins	Democratic	40.05%	No third candidate			0.23%
2022	Shelly Boshart Davis	Republican	59.99%	Benjamin Watts	Democratic	39.90%	No third candidate			0.11%
2024	Shelly Boshart Davis	Republican	58.7%	Terrence Virnig	Democratic	41.2%	No third candidate			0.1%

== See also ==
- Oregon Legislative Assembly
- Oregon House of Representatives
