= Shelly Boshart Davis =

American politician (born 1980)

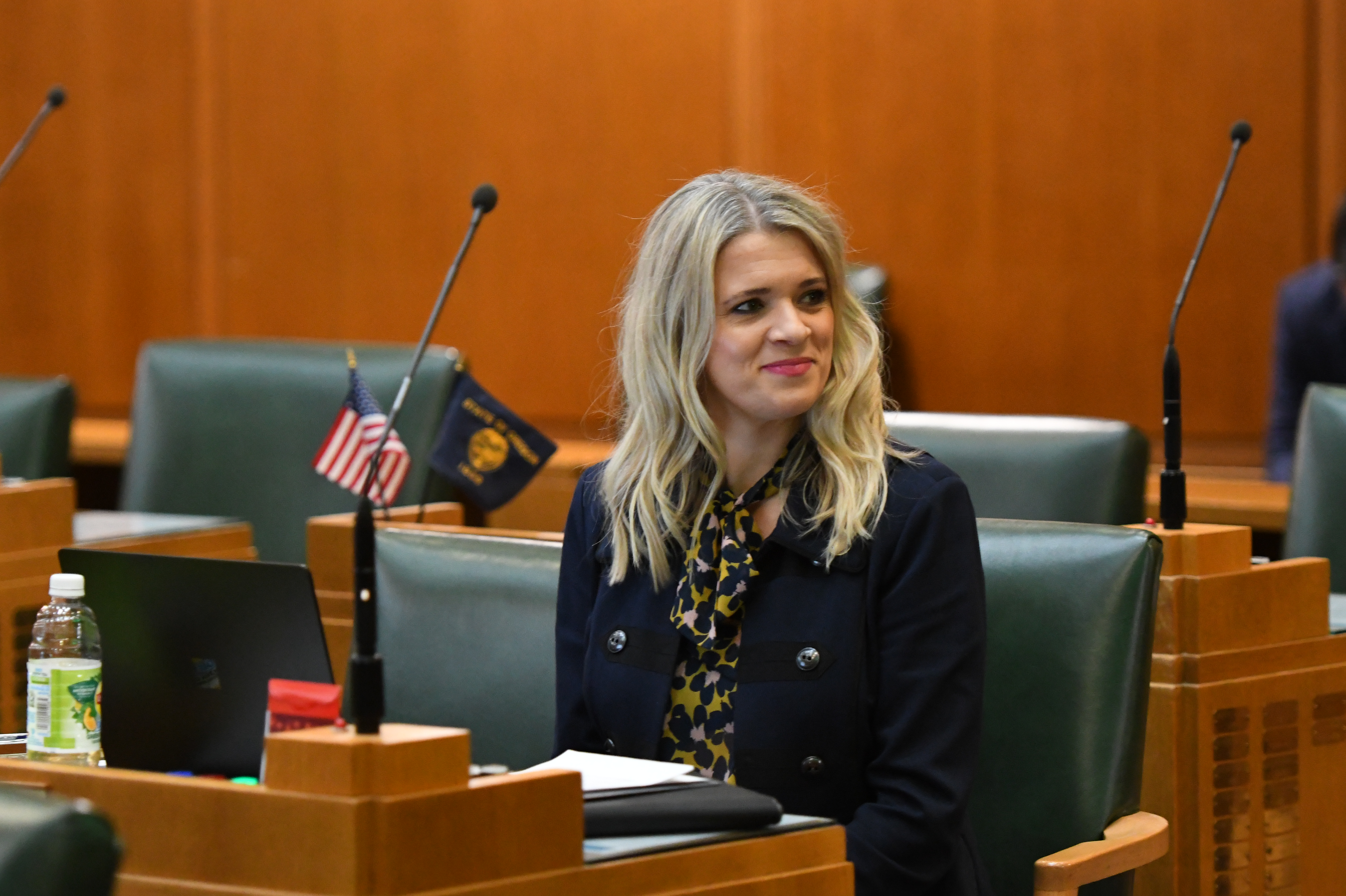

Member of the Oregon House of Representatives from the 15th district
- Incumbent
- Assumed office January 14, 2019
- Preceded by: Andy Olson

Personal details
- Born: January 8, 1980 (age 46)
- Party: Republican
- Spouse: Geoff
- Children: 3
- Education: Oregon State University
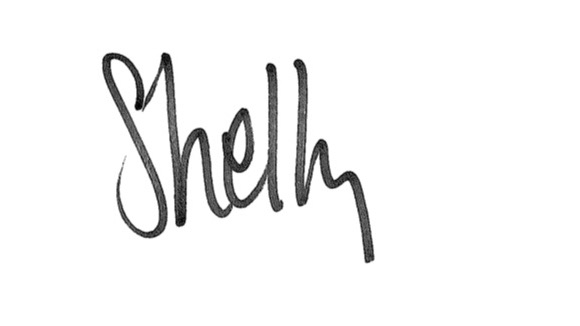
- Signature

Shelly Boshart Davis (born January 8, 1980) is an Oregon Republican politician and small business-owner. She serves in the Oregon House of Representatives for District 15, representing parts of Linn and Benton counties, including the cities of Albany, Millersburg, and Tangent.

== Early life and career ==
Boshart Davis grew up in the Mid-Willamette Valley on her family's farm. She earned her Bachelor of Science in Business Administration from Oregon State University. In 2018, Boshart Davis, with Macey Wessels, purchased Boshart Trucking from her parents.

She serves on the Government Affairs Committee for the Albany Chamber of Commerce, and previously sat on the local United Way board. In 2016, she was appointed to the Linn County Budget Committee. She is involved with the Linn County Farm Bureau, Oregon Women for Agriculture, Oregon Trucking Association, and Oregon Seed Council. Nationally, she has served as president for the U.S. Forage Export Council, and she sits on the advisory committee for the Agriculture Transportation Coalition. Boshart Davis has been involved in agricultural education in the Mid-Valley area, sitting on the board for the nonprofit association, Oregon Aglink, and volunteering with three local schools through the Adopt-A-Farmer program.

== Political career ==
After Andy Olson announced he would not seek an 8th term as Representative from District 15 in the Oregon Legislature, Boshart Davis announced she would be running to fill the vacancy with Olson's endorsement. She ran an unopposed primary election campaign. In November 2018, Boshart Davis defeated Democrat, Jerred Taylor and Independent, Cynthia Hyatt to become the representative of House District 15.

She assumed office on January 15, 2019, as an official member of the 80th Oregon Legislative Assembly. She serves on the House Committee on Business and Labor, House Committee on Agriculture and Land Use, and on the Joint Committee on Carbon Reduction.

=== 2025 Civil Rights lawsuit ===
In July 2025, a federal civil rights complaint was filed in the U.S. District Court for the District of Oregon, Eugene Division, naming Shelly Boshart Davis among the defendants.

According to the Albany Democrat-Herald, the lawsuit filed by Logan Martin Isaac names Boshart Davis as a defendant in a civil rights complaint alleging Boshart Davis acted under color of law to deprive him of First Amendment rights to assembly and speech.

As of the latest publicly available court filings, the case remains pending.

== Electoral history ==
2018 Oregon State Representative, 15th district
Party	Candidate	Votes	%
Republican	Shelly Boshart Davis	17,480	56.3
Democratic	Jerred Taylor	11,991	38.6
Independent	Cynthia Hyatt	1,539	5.0
Write-in		40	0.1
Total votes		31,050	100%

2020 Oregon State Representative, 15th district
Party	Candidate	Votes	%
Republican	Shelly Boshart Davis	23,481	59.7
Democratic	Miriam G Cummins	15,747	40.1
Write-in		90	0.2
Total votes		39,318	100%

2022 Oregon State Representative, 15th district
Party	Candidate	Votes	%
Republican	Shelly Boshart Davis	19,995	60.0
Democratic	Benjamin Watts	13,300	39.9
Write-in		35	0.1
Total votes		33,330	100%

2024 Oregon State Representative, 15th district
Party	Candidate	Votes	%
Republican	Shelly Boshart Davis	22,197	58.7
Democratic	Terrence Virnig	15,566	41.2
Write-in		43	0.1
Total votes		37,806	100%
