= Cliff Zauner =

American politician

Member of the Oregon House of Representatives from the 22nd district
- In office January 18, 2001 – January 10, 2005
- Preceded by: Laurie Monnes Anderson
- Succeeded by: Betty Komp

Personal details
- Died: November 29, 2020
- Party: Republican
- Spouse: Virginia
- Children: 4

Clifford Anthony Zauner was a former member of the Oregon House of Representatives, representing District 22 for one term. As of 2025, he is the last Republican to represent Woodburn in the legislature.

== Career ==
Zauner spent 40 years working as a sports radio host. Zauner was first elected in 2000 to the 38th district, but was later redistricted to the 22nd. After retiring from the legislature, Zauner put up political signs on state highways, using relationships he formed with farmers during his tenure. In 2001, he introduced a bill to ban bilingual education, which failed. He was a Roman Catholic, a Eucharistic Minister at St. Luke's church. On November 28, 2020, Zauner died due to complications related to stroke at age 86.
