= Tony Meeker =

American politician (born 1939)

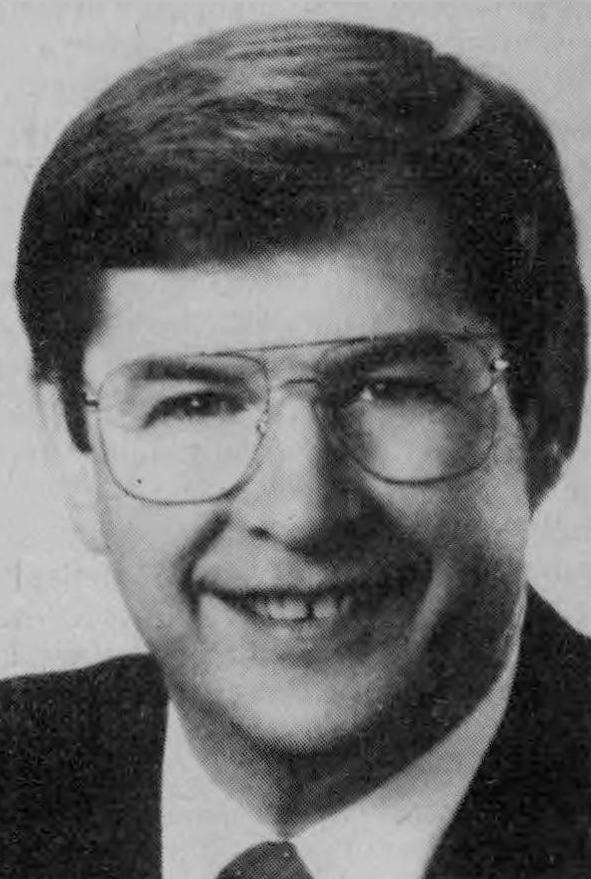

Oregon State Treasurer
- In office July 9, 1987 – January 4, 1993
- Governor: Neil Goldschmidt; Barbara Roberts
- Preceded by: Bill Rutherford (R)
- Succeeded by: Jim Hill (D)

Member of the Oregon Senate from the 15th district
- In office 1972–1986
- Succeeded by: Jim Bunn

Member of the Oregon House of Representatives from the 29th district
- In office 1968–1972
- Preceded by: Harold V. Lewis
- Succeeded by: Stan Bunn

Personal details
- Born: March 18, 1939 (age 87) Portland, Oregon, U.S.
- Party: Republican
- Occupation: Agricultural businessman

Anthony Meeker (born March 18, 1939) is a politician in Oregon. He was appointed State Treasurer in 1987. Oregon Governor Neil Goldschmidt appointed him to fill the vacancy created when Bill Rutherford resigned from office. Meeker was elected to a full term in 1988. He had also served in the Oregon House of Representatives and in the Oregon State Senate. To date, Meeker is the most recent Republican State Treasurer of Oregon.

== Biography ==
Meeker was born in Amity, Oregon, in 1939.

In 1986, Tony Meeker ran for Congress against Democrat Les AuCoin in Oregon's first congressional district. After losing to AuCoin, Meeker returned to the State Senate to continue his fifth term representing citizens in portions of Yamhill and Marion counties. Oregon State Treasurer Bill Rutherford announced he was stepping down to take a position in an investment firm in New York City. On July 9, 1987 Democratic Governor Neil Goldschmidt appointed Meeker, a Republican, to replace Rutherford, also a Republican, to fill the remainder of Rutherford's term. He made a second unsuccessful bid for U.S. Congress in 1992, losing to Elizabeth Furse. To date, he is the most recent Republican to serve as treasurer, as all subsequent treasurers have been Democrats.

Political offices
Preceded by Bill Rutherford	Treasurer of Oregon; 1987–1993	Succeeded by Jim Hill
