= Alan Brown (Oregon politician) =

American politician from Oregon

Member of the Oregon House of Representatives from the 10th district
- In office January 8, 2001 – January 2007
- Preceded by: Terry Thompson
- Succeeded by: Jean Cowan

Personal details
- Party: Republican

Alan Brown is an American politician who served in the Oregon House of Representatives from 2001 until 2006. He represented the 4th district in 2001, but was redistricted to the 10th following the 2000 United States census; both districts contained his residence of Newport. He chaired the Transportation committee in 2003, and worked in the Oregon Transportation Department for 14 years. He also worked as a Port of Newport commissioner and Newport City Council member. As of 2024, he is the last Republican elected to the House from Lincoln County. One project he worked on is the Highway 20 Pioneer Mountain to Eddyville road.
