= Lewis & Clark Law School =

Private law school in Portland, Oregon, US

Coordinates: 45.4525°N 122.677°W

- Motto: Explorare, Discere, Sociare (Latin)
- Parent school: Lewis & Clark College
- Established: 1915
- School type: Private
- Parent endowment: US$231.2 million
- Dean: Alicia Ouellette
- Location: Portland, Oregon, US
- Enrollment: 719
- Faculty: 107
- USNWR ranking: 84th (2024)
- Bar pass rate: 87% (ABA profile)
- Website: law.lclark.edu
- ABA profile: Lewis & Clark Profile

The Northwestern School of Law of Lewis and Clark College (also known as Lewis & Clark Law School), is an American Bar Association-approved private law school in Portland, Oregon.

The law school received ABA approval in 1970 and joined the Association of American Law Schools (AALS) in 1973.

Lewis & Clark Law School offers the Juris Doctor (J.D.) degree, including a range of scholastic concentrations and legal certificate programs, as well as Master of Laws (LLM) and Master of Studies in Law (MSL) degrees in environmental, natural resources, and energy law, and LLM and MSL degrees in animal law.

Each class in the three-year J.D. program has approximately 180 students. The former dean of Lewis & Clark Law School is Jennifer Johnson, Erskine Wood Sr. Professor of Law, a securities law scholar and arbitration expert, as well as a member of the American Law Institute. Dean Johnson stepped down from her role in August 2024, succeeded by former President of Albany Law School Alicia Ouellette. John Parry, the Edward Brunet Professor of Law, served as interim dean prior to Alicia Oullette taking up her post.

Lewis & Clark law students can complete their degrees on full-time or part-time schedules, take courses during the day or evening, and focus in a number of legal specialties. The institution has a general law review and a range of specialty programs, including environmental law, animal law, public interest law, and the lawyering program. According to Lewis & Clark's official ABA-required disclosures, 78% of the Class of 2024 obtained full-time, long-term, JD-required or JD-preferred employment nine months after graduation.

== Campus grounds ==
The law school grounds are adjacent to a forested natural area, replete with 14-miles of biking and jogging trails in Tryon Creek State Park. The Law School is 4-miles from downtown, in the Southern hills of Portland, west of the Willamette River, at the base of the undergraduate campus of Lewis & Clark College.

The Lewis & Clark College undergraduate, graduate school, and law campus grounds collectively occupy 137 acres (554,000 m^{2}), centered on the M. Lloyd Frank Estate on Palatine Hill in the Collins View neighborhood of Southwest Portland.

== History ==
Lewis & Clark Law School's origins began with the University of Oregon establishing a Department of Law in Portland in 1885. After the Oregon State Legislature moved the program to Eugene, Oregon in 1915, several law faculty members resisted the move, and formed the Northwestern College of Law.

In 1965, the faculty and overseers of Northwestern College of Law joined with the president and trustees of Lewis & Clark College to incorporate the Northwestern School of Law of Lewis & Clark College. Harold Wren was Dean of the law school from 1969 to 1972.

Today the college has over 100 faculty and staff. Faculty members regularly appear as expert witnesses in legal proceedings, publish legal texts, and contribute original research to legal scholarship nationwide.

== Law library ==
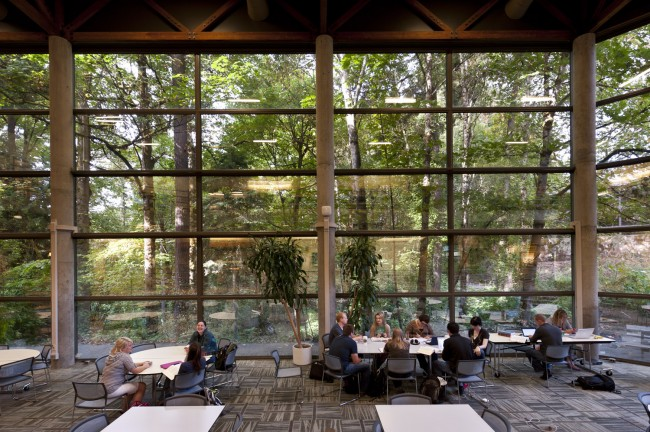
Legal research center

The Paul L. Boley Law Library is the largest law library in Oregon, with a collection of over 500,000 volumes as of 2025.

== Animal Law Program ==
Lewis & Clark Law School is a pioneer in the field of animal law, it offered some of the first animal law courses in the world and in 1992 students founded the first Animal Law Conference in the U.S. The Center for Animal Studies (CALS) was founded at the school in 2008, becoming the first formal animal law program in the world and eventually giving rise to the first Animal Law Clinic. In 2012 CALS launched the first post-JD master of laws (LLM) in Animal Law. The school has the top ranked animal law program in the United States.

== Rankings ==
In 2026, U.S. News & World Report ranked Lewis & Clark Law School #112. It also ranked Lewis & Clark #2 in Environmental law, (tie with UC Berkeley School of Law).

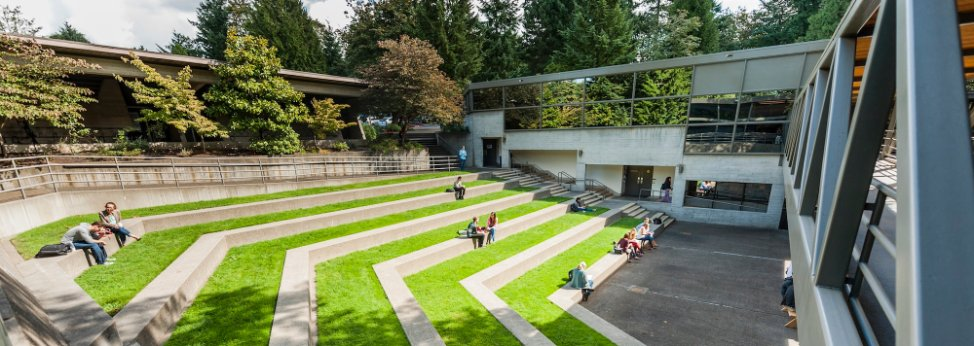
LC outdoor amphitheater

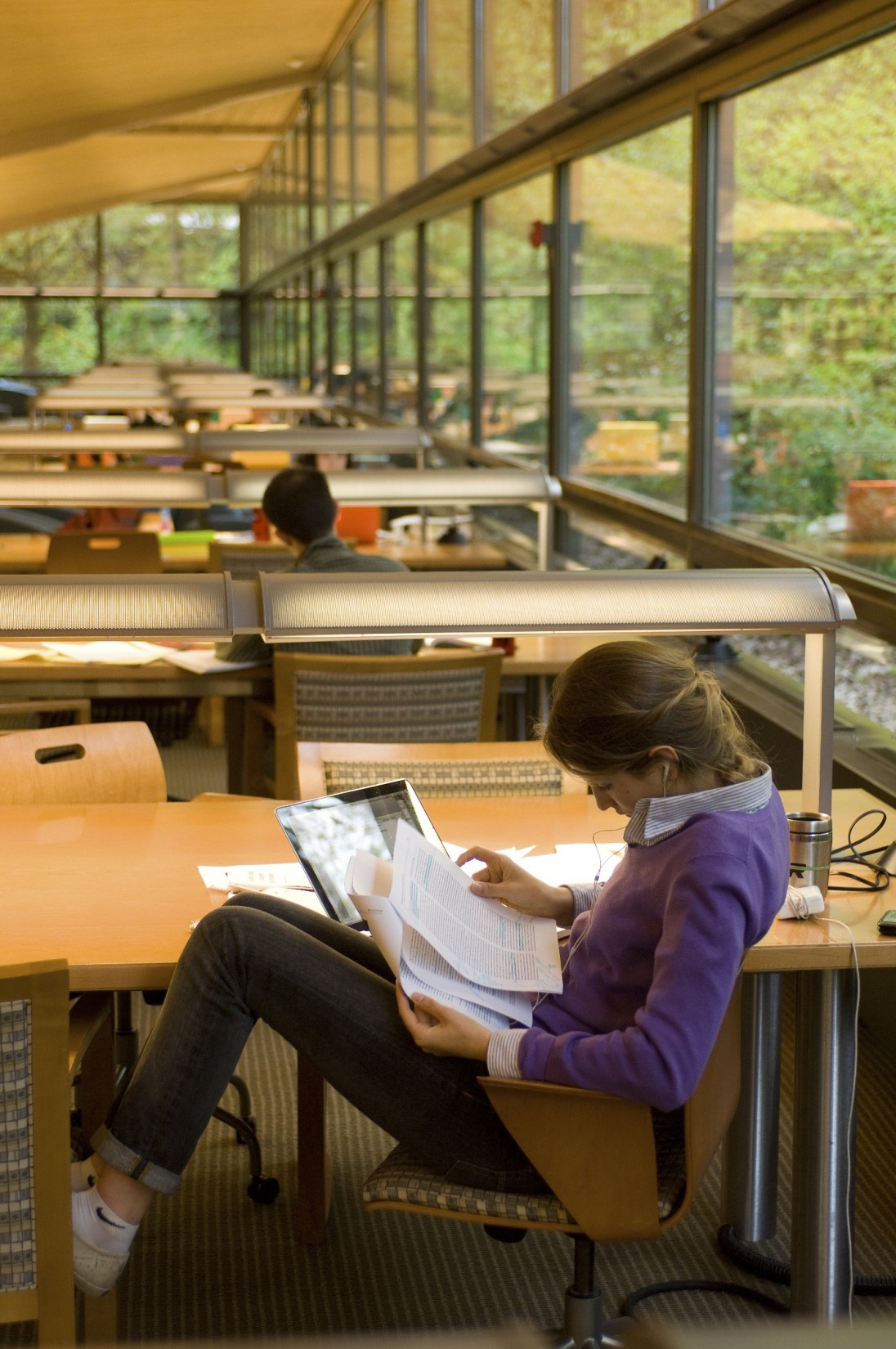
Boley Law library houses a quiet reading room (pictured) and is currently the largest law library in the state of Oregon.

== Law centers and institutes ==
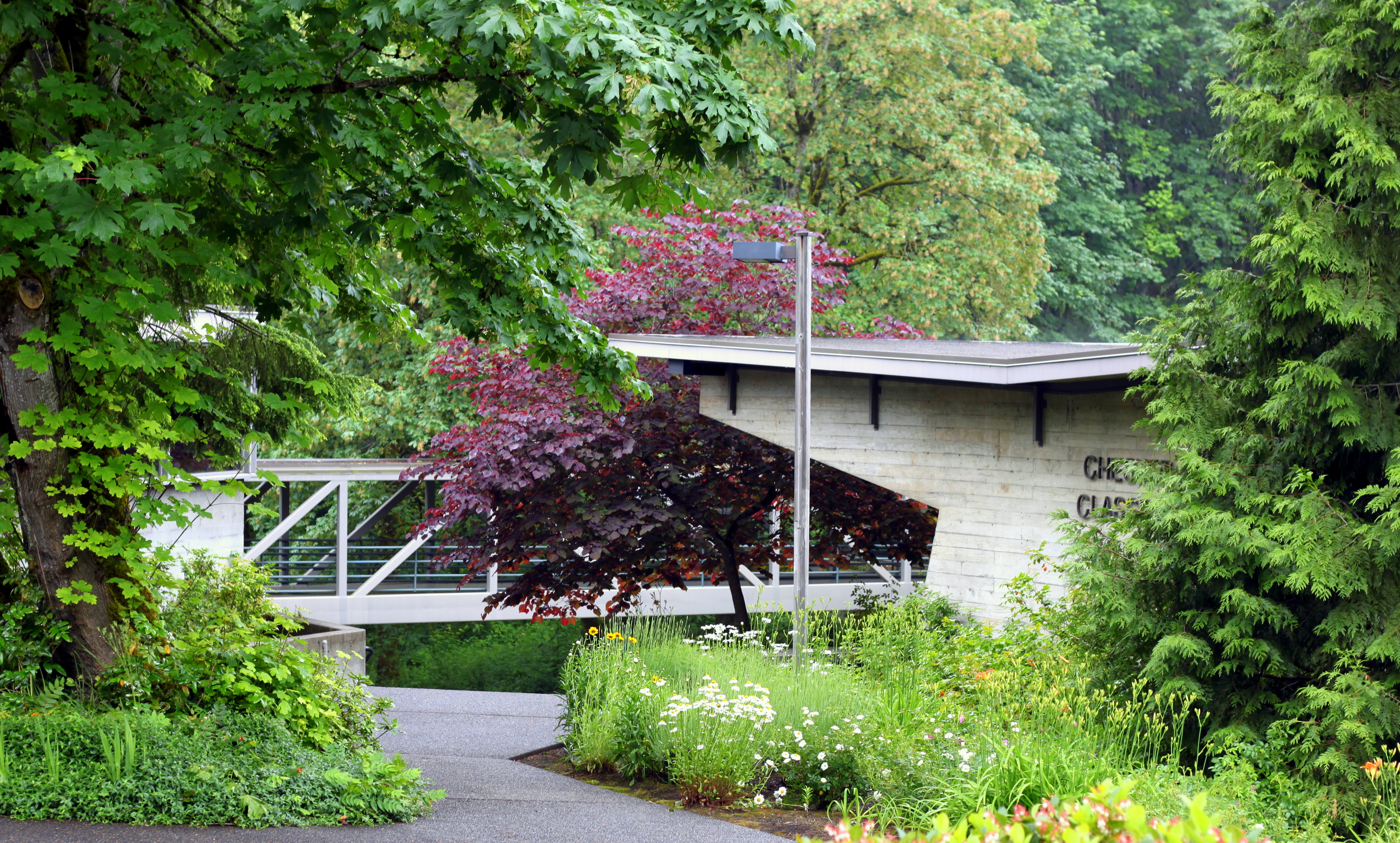
Lewis & Clark Law School McCarty Complex

- Center for Animal Law Studies
- Earthrise Law Center
- Green Energy Institute
- National Crime Victim Law Institute
- Natural Resources Law Institute
- Northwest Environmental Defense Center (NEDC)
- Western Resources Legal Center (WRLC)
- International Environmental Law Project (IELP)

== Journals ==
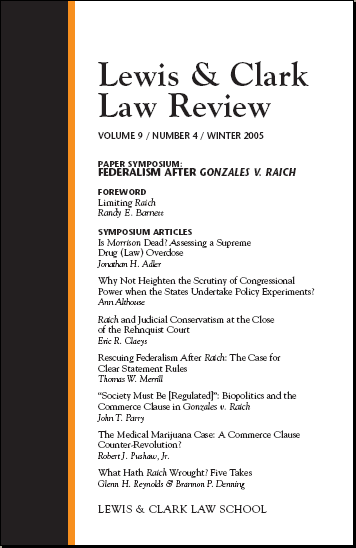
Masthead of the Lewis & Clark Law Review

Lewis & Clark Law School supports three student-edited scholarly journals:

- Environmental Law Review
- Animal Law Review
- Lewis & Clark Law Review

== Practical skills ==
=== National moot court competitions ===
Lewis & Clark law students benefit from the campus serving as a destination for several national moot courts. In 2013, Chief Justice of the United States John G. Roberts launched Lewis & Clark's Environmental Moot Court Competition, presiding as a guest judge.

The campus also serves as the permanent host of the National Native American Law Students Association (NALSA) Moot Court Competition and the International Law Students Association (ILSA) Pacific Regional Philip C. Jessup International Law Moot Court Competition. Additionally, the ILSA Student Initiated Lecture Series at Lewis & Clark has been internationally recognized for academic excellence.

=== Semester abroad opportunities ===
In addition, the law school has developed a number of exclusive global summer externship placements. There are options in India for students interested in business, litigation, transactional, public interest, human rights, and environmental practice through placement with firms and NGOs in Delhi, Hyderabad, and Mumbai. The law school has also secured exclusive placements in Asia, for students interested in international law firm experience. Past placements include firms in both Beijing and Shanghai, China.

== Employment ==
According to Lewis & Clark's official ABA-required disclosures, 78% of the Class of 2024 obtained full-time, long-term, JD-required or JD-preferred employment nine months after graduation. Lewis & Clark's Law School Transparency under-employment score is 18.6%, indicating the percentage of the Class of 2024 unemployed, pursuing an additional degree, or working in a non-professional, short-term, or part-time job nine months after graduation.

== Costs ==
The average cost of attendance at Lewis & Clark Law School for the 2016–17 school year includes tuition ($43,240 full-time, $32,426 part-time); fees ($50 public interest fee); health insurance ($2,402 if not already covered); and average cost of living expenses ($18,761).

== Notable alumni ==
=== Law and politics ===
==== U.S. Congress ====
- Alexander G. Barry (1915), former U.S. Senator from Oregon
- Cliff Bentz (1979), U.S. Representative from Oregon
- Earl Blumenauer (1976), U.S. Representative from Oregon
- Heidi Heitkamp (1980), former U.S. Senator from North Dakota and 28th North Dakota Attorney General

==== Federal Court judges ====
- Anna Brown (1980), Senior Judge of the U.S. District Court for the District of Oregon
- Robert E. Jones (1953), Senior Judge of the U.S. District Court for the District of Oregon
- Garr King (1963), former Senior Judge of the U.S. District Court for the District of Oregon
- Michael J. McShane (1988), Chief Judge of the U.S. District Court for the District of Oregon
- Owen M. Panner, former Chief Judge of the U.S. District Court for the District of Oregon

==== State and local politics ====
- Brad Avakian (1990), former Labor Commissioner of Oregon
- Craig Berkman, former chair of the Oregon Republican Party
- Kate Brown (1985), 38th Governor of Oregon
- Charles Crookham (1951), 13th Oregon Attorney General
- Shemia Fagan (2009), 28th Oregon Secretary of State
- John Hubert Hall (1926), 24th Governor of Oregon
- Betsy Johnson (1977), former Oregon State Senator and independent candidate for Governor of Oregon in 2022
- Nick Kahl (2009), former Oregon State Representative
- H. Clay Myers, Jr., 19th Oregon Secretary of State
- Shawn Reilly, 34th mayor of Waukesha, Wisconsin
- Lou Savage (1974), former Oregon Insurance Commissioner and legal reform advocate
- Lane Shetterly (1981), former Oregon State Representative and DLCD director
- Gail Shibley (2009), former Oregon State Representative
- Max Williams (1991), former State Representative and Department of Corrections director

==== State judges ====
- Richard C. Baldwin (1975), former Justice of the Oregon Supreme Court
- Dean Bryson (1934), former Justice of the Oregon Supreme Court
- Mercedes Deiz (1959), former Judge of the Multnomah County Circuit Court, first black woman to be admitted to the Oregon State Bar Association
- Ralph Holman (1937), former Justice of the Oregon Supreme Court
- Bronson James (2003), Justice of the Oregon Supreme Court
- Jack Landau (1980), former Justice of the Oregon Supreme Court
- Betty Roberts (1966), first female Justice of the Oregon Supreme Court
- Mary Jane Spurlin, former Judge of the Multnomah County District Court, first female judge in the state of Oregon
- David Avraham Voluck, Alaska tribal court judge

==== Other U.S. political figures ====
- Donald C. Johnson (1974), former U.S. Ambassador to Cape Verde and Mongolia
- Ronald A. Marks (1979), former senior CIA official
- Phil Schiliro (1981), former White House Director of Legislative Affairs in the Obama Administration
- Mildred Schwab (1939), former Portland City Commissioner and one of the first women to study law

==== Attorneys ====
- Sim Gill, District Attorney for Salt Lake County, Utah
- Peter Robinson (1978), International Criminal Court lawyer

=== Academia ===
- Robin Kundis Craig (1996), environmental law scholar

=== Activism ===
- Beatrice Morrow Cannady (1922), civil rights activist and newspaper editor
- Bernard Zaleha (1987), former member of the National Board of Directors and former National Vice President of the Sierra Club

=== Business ===
- Wayne M. Perry (1975), businessman, 35th president of the Boy Scouts of America and minority owner of the Seattle Mariners
- Leonard Shoen (1955), businessman and founder of U-Haul
