= Bernie Zaleha =

American environmentalist

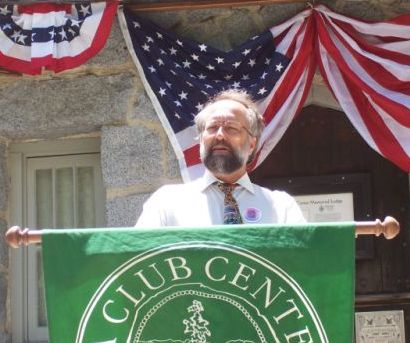
Zaleha at LeConte Lodge, 2003

Daniel Bernard Daley Zaleha (born July 19, 1957) is an American environmentalist who served two terms on the national board of directors of the Sierra Club. He was nominated by committee and then elected by the national membership in April 2003, and was re-elected in April 2006. From March 2004 to May 2006, he served as the 62nd national vice president of the club. He has been an environmental activist with the Sierra Club and other organizations since 1981. He also serves as Vice President of the Constitutional Law Foundation.

Zaleha is a graduate of California State University, San Bernardino in 1983, receiving his bachelor's degree in Environmental Studies and Physical Geography. He received his Juris Doctor in 1987 from Lewis and Clark College's Northwestern School of Law, with a certificate in Environmental and Natural Resource Law. While at Lewis and Clark Law School, Zaleha served as the Executive Director of the Northwest Environmental Defense Center in Portland, Oregon. He received his Master of Arts in Religion at the University of Florida in 2008. His thesis is titled “The Only Paradise We Ever Need": An Investigation into Pantheism's Sacred Geography in the Writings of Edward Abbey, Thomas Berry, and Matthew Fox, and a Preliminary Survey of Signs of Emerging Pantheism in American Culture. He received his Doctor of Philosophy in Sociology & Environmental Studies at the University of California, Santa Cruz in 2018. His dissertation is titled “A Tale of Two Christianities": The Religiopolitical Clash Over Climate Change Within America's Dominant Religion.

Zaleha was fired from a Boise firm in 1992 after his employer found out he was a Sierra Club activist. Some of the firm's clients were polluters, and the firm worried that extractive industry clients would go elsewhere for legal representation if they knew a Sierra Club leader was employed by the firm. In a lawsuit that received coverage from various national media outlets, he sued his former firm for religious discrimination under the Civil Rights Act of 1964, claiming that his Sierra Club activism was religiously mandated by his Unitarian Universalist faith. That suit was eventually settled while on appeal to the Idaho Supreme Court.

After being fired, Zaleha took on the criminal and civil defense of various Earth First activists. From 1998 to 2002, he headed the Sierra Club's national priority campaign to end commercial logging on federal public lands. He also represented various environmental, sporting, and conservation groups in litigation against the U.S. Forest Service, challenging proposed timber sales in the Intermountain West.

Zaleha is also the founding president of the Fund for Christian Ecology, and has received recognition as a lay eco-theologian, primarily for authoring two essays, Recovering Christian Pantheism as a Lost Gospel of Creation and Befriending the Earth, which are published on the Fund's website.
