= Tom Bunn =

American politician and law enforcement officer (born c. 1959)

Member of the Oregon House of Representatives from the 29th district
- In office July 1992 – January 1993
- Preceded by: Stan Bunn
- Succeeded by: Marilyn Dell

Yamhill County Commissioner
- In office 1995–2003

Mayor of Amity, Oregon
- In office 1987–1988

Personal details
- Born: c. 1959 Yamhill County, Oregon
- Party: Republican
- Spouse: Lona
- Relations: Jim Bunn (brother); Stan Bunn (brother)
- Children: 6
- Occupation: Law enforcement

Thomas E. Bunn (born c. 1959) is a former law enforcement officer and politician in the U.S. state of Oregon. A Republican, he served part of a term in the Oregon House of Representatives while two of his brothers, Jim Bunn and Stan Bunn, also served in the Oregon Legislative Assembly. A former sheriff’s deputy in Yamhill County, Tom later served two terms as a county commissioner. He was also mayor of Amity and a member of its city council.

== Early life ==
Thomas Bunn was born around 1959 in Yamhill County, Oregon, to Ben and Viola (Fulgham) Bunn. Along with his twin brother Tim, he was the youngest of eleven children, with five brothers and five sisters. He grew up on the family farm near Dayton along the Yamhill River. The Bunn family was politically active; his grandfather was once mayor of Lafayette, Oregon, his father served on the local school board, and his brothers Jim Bunn and Stan Bunn both served in the state legislature, with Jim also serving in the U.S. Congress.

Tom graduated from Dayton High School and attended Northwest Nazarene College in Nampa, Idaho, where he was in the Army Reserve Officer Training Corps. Bunn graduated with a Bachelor of Arts degree in business. He was commissioned in the Oregon Army National Guard, eventually reaching the rank of lieutenant colonel. He also attended, but did not graduate from, Northwestern California University School of Law, a correspondence law school.

Following college, he returned to Oregon and worked for seven years as a deputy for the Yamhill County Sheriff’s Office. Bunn and his wife Lona married around 1980 and have six children: Mark, Thomas, Ukiah, Seth, McKenzie, and Peter. He farmed on the family farm near Dayton, and in 1994 began working for the Yamhill County Jail.

== Political career ==
Bunn’s first political office was as a city council member in Amity, where he served from 1983 to 1987. He then served as the city's mayor from 1987 to 1988. In July 1992, his brother Stan resigned from his seat in the Oregon House of Representatives after being appointed to the Oregon State Senate. The next day, the Yamhill County Commission appointed Tom, also a Republican, to fill Stan’s seat in the House representing District 29. With his brother Jim already serving in the Senate, three Bunn brothers served in the Oregon Legislative Assembly simultaneously. Tom served until 1993, as the primary elections had already determined the candidates for the November election. He also served as a judge for the Yamhill Municipal Court.

In November 1994, he was elected as a commissioner of Yamhill County. As commissioner, he worked to pass a county ordinance prohibiting the sale or manufacture of drug paraphernalia in 1995, and twice tried to ban the possession of marijuana seeds, in 1996 and 1997. In 1997, he wrote a law that prohibited county employees from facilitating abortions. The law was subsequently challenged by the American Civil Liberties Union as unconstitutional at both the state and federal levels.

Bunn won re-election to a second four-year term on the commission. In 1999, his brother Jim, who had lost a re-election bid to Congress in 1996, applied for an appointment as county treasurer. Tom recused himself from the interviewing process but cast the tie-breaking vote to appoint his brother, after the county attorney advised that it would not be inappropriate. The incident led to an ethics investigation, which was ultimately dismissed. Jim resigned from the position before taking office. Following the incident, Tom recused himself from any possible conflicts of interest. He lost his bid for re-election in 2002.
