= Denny Smith =

American politician (born 1938)

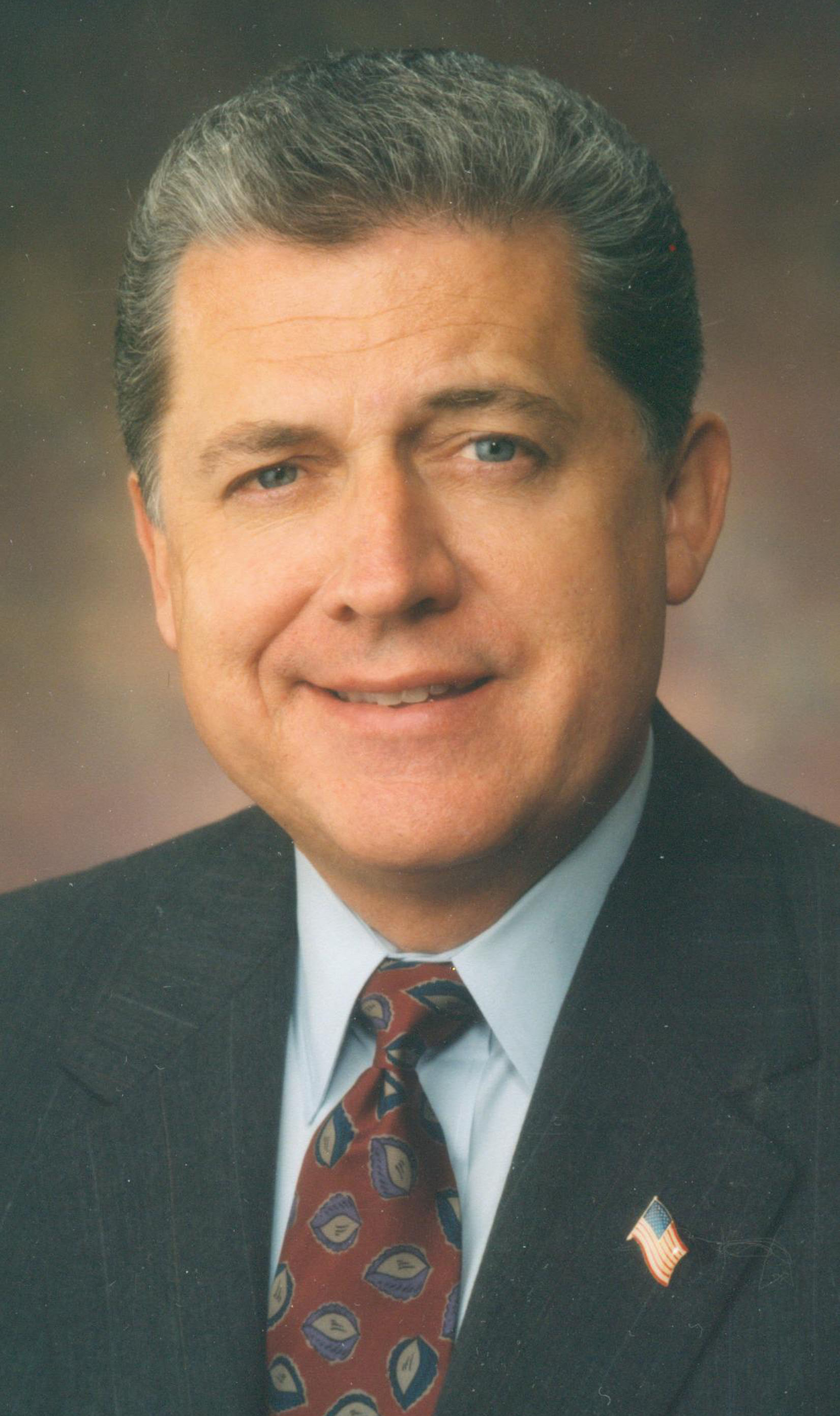

Member of the U.S. House of Representatives from Oregon
- In office January 3, 1981 – January 3, 1991
- Preceded by: Al Ullman
- Succeeded by: Mike Kopetski
- Constituency: 2nd district (1981–1983); 5th district (1983–1991)

Personal details
- Born: Dennis Alan Smith; January 19, 1938 (age 88) Ontario, Oregon, U.S.
- Party: Republican
- Spouse: Sandra Smith (m. 1962; div. 1967) Deanna Smith (m. 1989; died 2011)
- Relatives: Elmo Smith (father)
- Education: Willamette University (BA)

Dennis Alan Smith (born January 19, 1938) is an American businessman, publisher, Vietnam War veteran, and former United States congressman from the state of Oregon. A native of the state, he served in the Air Force before working in the airline industry and taking over the family's newspaper business. A Republican, he served 5 terms in Congress from 1981 until 1991. His father was former Oregon Governor Elmo Smith.

== Early life ==
Dennis Smith was born in the Eastern Oregon city of Ontario, Oregon, on January 19, 1938. In 1956, he graduated from Grant Union High School in John Day and enrolled at Willamette University in Salem.

=== Military service ===
He joined the United States Air Force in 1958, and served until 1960, when he joined the Oregon Air National Guard. Smith then earned a bachelor of arts degree from Willamette in 1961. He returned to the Air Force in 1962 and remained there until 1967, serving as a fighter pilot in the Vietnam War. In the war, he flew the F-4C Phantom and completed about 180 missions. Smith remained in the aviation field as a flight engineer and co-pilot for a commercial airline, flying from 1967 until 1976.

=== Newspaper business ===
In 1968, he also took over the family's newspaper business when his father died. He worked for Pan American Airlines, and in 1974 was chosen by fellow employees to serve as the union's lobbyist in Washington, DC. He was inducted into the Oregon Aviation Hall of Honor in 2009.

== Political career ==
Smith was first elected to the United States House of Representatives in 1980 to represent Oregon's 2nd congressional district as a Republican. He defeated 12-term Democrat Al Ullman by only 3,700 votes. Smith was undoubtedly helped by Ronald Reagan winning every county in the sprawling district.

For his first term, Smith represented a vast district that stretched from his home in the state capital, Salem, all the way to the Idaho border. When the 1980 census gave Oregon another congressional district, Smith's home in Salem, along with much of the western portion of the old 2nd, was placed in the newly created 5th district. He was elected from this district in 1982 and was reelected three more times. While in the House, Smith served on the Budget, the Interior and Insular Affairs, and Veterans' Affairs committees.

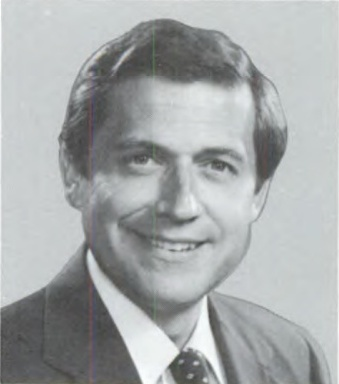
Photo of Denny Smith from the Congressional Pictorial Directory for the 97th Congress.

Smith was comfortably reelected in 1984 and 1986. In 1988, however, he was nearly defeated by Democratic State Representative Mike Kopetski, winning by only 707 votes. Kopetski sought a rematch in 1990 and won by attacking Smith for his ties to several collapsed savings and loans. While still serving in Congress, Smith established and headed Oregonians Against Crime, which placed Oregon's 1988 Anti-crime Bill on the ballot by initiative petition and successfully campaigned for its passage.

=== Campaign for governor ===
In 1994, Smith was the Republican nominee for Governor of Oregon, but lost to Democratic state Senate President John Kitzhaber.

He was also the Republican National Committeeman for Oregon up until 2000.

== Later years ==
Smith is the chairman of Eagle Newspapers, a printing and publishing company in the Pacific Northwest. He was inducted by the Oregon Newspaper Publishers Association into the Oregon Newspaper Hall of Fame in 2012.

== Family life ==
Smith married Sandra in 1962 and was divorced in 1967, after the couple had one son.

He married Kathleen Barrett, and they had three children, divorcing in 1986. Smith married Deanna Marie Koenig in 1989. Deanna died in 2011.

The only son of former Oregon Governor Elmo Smith and his wife Dorothy, he is also a cousin of Steve Symms, a former congressman and Senator from Idaho.

U.S. House of Representatives
Preceded by Al Ullman	Member of the U.S. House of Representatives from Oregon's 2nd congressional district 1981–1983	Succeeded by Bob Smith
New constituency	Member of the U.S. House of Representatives from Oregon's 5th congressional district 1983–1991	Succeeded by Mike Kopetski
Party political offices
Preceded by Dave Frohnmayer	Republican nominee for Governor of Oregon; 1994	Succeeded by Bill Sizemore
U.S. order of precedence (ceremonial)
Preceded by Erik Paulsen as Former U.S. Representative	Order of precedence of the United States as Former U.S. Representative	Succeeded by Jim Ryun as Former U.S. Representative
