= Dan Doyle (politician) =

American politician and attorney

Member of the Oregon House of Representatives 30th district (2001–2003) 19th district (2003–2005)
- In office January 3, 2001 – January 31, 2005

Personal details
- Party: Republican
- Education: Arizona State University

Dan Doyle is a former Republican state legislator and attorney from the U.S. state of Oregon. He represented Salem from 2001 to 2005 and served as co-chair of the Oregon Joint Ways and Means Committee.

He resigned from the House on January 31, 2005, and later pleaded guilty to falsifying reports relating to campaign finance. He resigned from the Oregon state bar and was sentenced to 10 months in jail.
