= Betsy Close =

American politician

Member of the Oregon State Senate from the 8th district
- In office October 26, 2012 – January 2015
- Preceded by: Frank Morse
- Succeeded by: Sara Gelser

Member of the Oregon House of Representatives from the 36th (through 2002), then 15th district
- In office 1999–2004
- Preceded by: Carolyn Oakley (before redistricting)
- Succeeded by: Andy Olson (after redistricting)

Personal details
- Born: May 4, 1950 (age 76) Shelton, Washington
- Party: Republican
- Website: Senate website

Betsy L. Close (born May 4, 1950) is a Republican politician who served in the Oregon State Senate. Close was sworn into office in October 2012, replacing Frank Morse, who retired before his term ended. Prior to serving as Senator, Close served four terms as state representative and taught in Albany, Oregon, and Washington state.

In October 2013 she announced she would run for a full term. In the November 2014 election, Close was defeated by Democrat Sara Gelser.

Close was the Republican nominee in the 2004 Oregon Secretary of State election, but lost to Democrat Bill Bradbury.

== Electoral history ==
2004 Secretary of State
Party	Candidate	Votes	%
Democratic	Bill Bradbury	1,002,052	57.2
Republican	Betsy L. Close	690,228	39.4
Libertarian	Richard Morley	56,678	3.2
Write-in		3,871	0.2
Total votes		1,752,829	100%

2014 Oregon State Senator, 8th district
Party	Candidate	Votes	%
Democratic	Sara Gelser	27,826	55.7
Republican	Betsy L Close	21,922	43.8
Write-in		250	0.5
Total votes		49,998	100%
