= Dayton High School (Oregon) =

Location
- 801 Ferry Street; Dayton, Yamhill County, Oregon 97114; United States; 45.216204°N 123.084265°W

Information
- Type: Public
- Opened: 1937
- School district: Dayton School District 8
- Principal: Robin VanBuren
- Teaching staff: 19.32 (FTE)
- Grades: 9-12
- Enrollment: 323 (2022–2023)
- Student to teacher ratio: 16.72
- Colors: Cardinal, black, and white
- Athletics conference: OSAA West Valley League 3A-2
- Mascot: Pirate
- Website: dhs.daytonk12.org
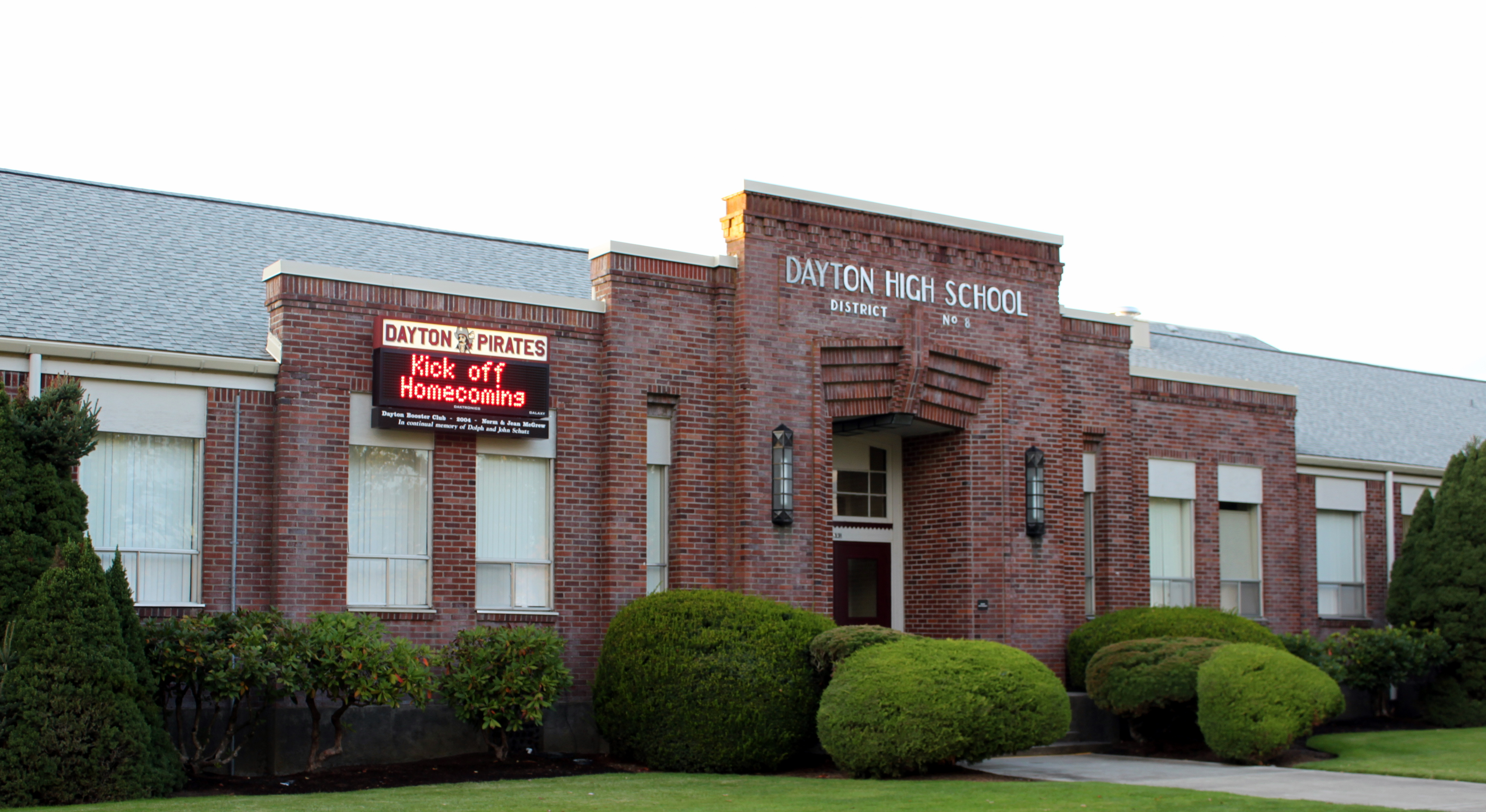
- Dayton High School
- U.S. National Register of Historic Places
- Built: 1935
- Architect: Freeman, C.N. and Company; Setergreen, H.G.
- Architectural style: Art Deco
- MPS: Dayton MRA
- NRHP reference No.: 87000339
- Added to NRHP: March 16, 1987

Dayton High School is a public high school in Dayton, Oregon, United States. The building was built in 1937 and remodeled in 2000.

== Academics ==
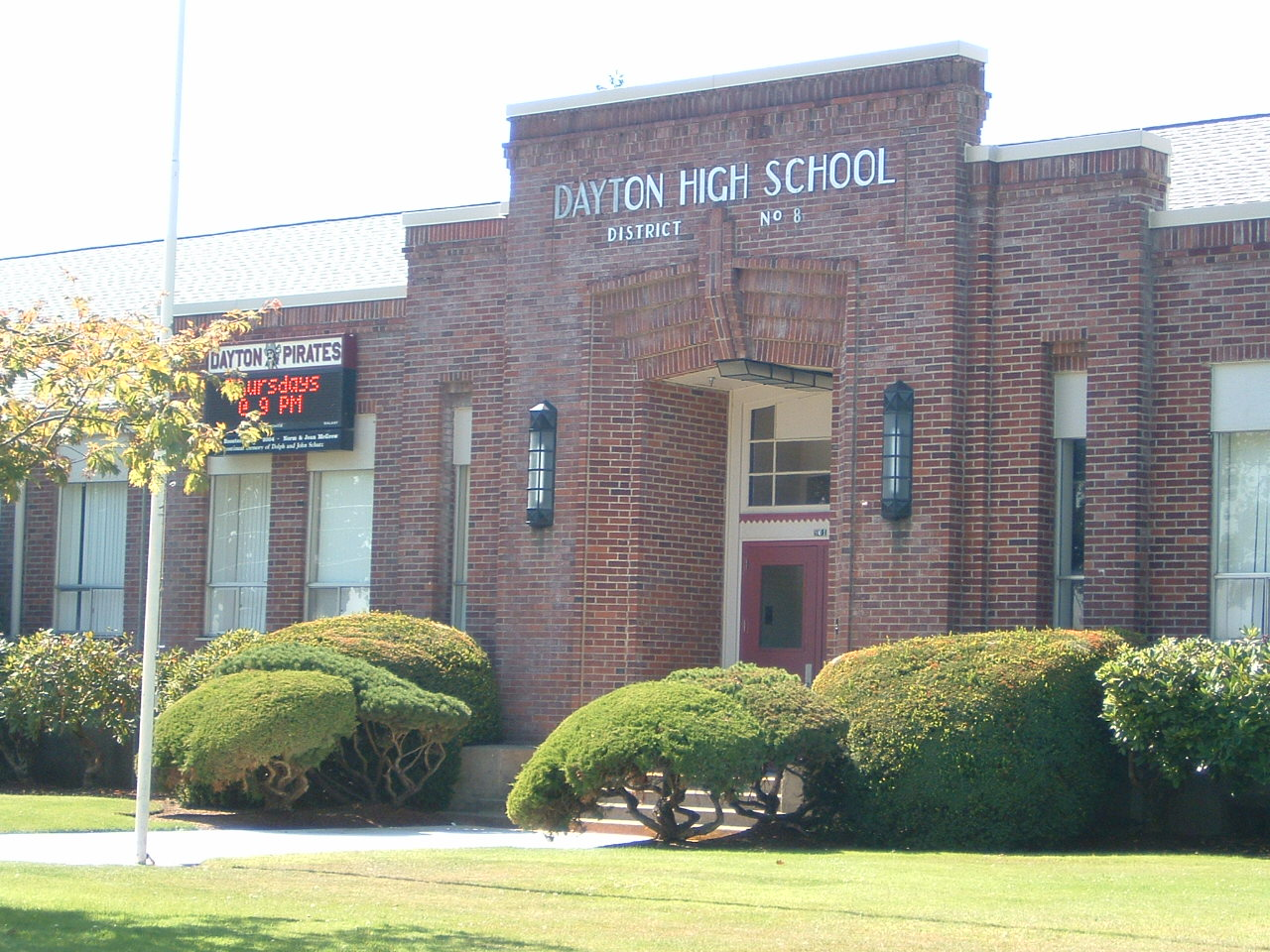

In 2008, 85% of the school's seniors received their high school diploma. Of 80 students, 68 graduated, 6 dropped out, and 6 are still in high school.

== Notable alumni ==
- Jim Bunn, former U.S. congressman
- Stan Bunn, former Oregon Superintendent of Public Instruction
- Dante Rosario, professional football player
