= Barbara Ross =

English social worker and gender counsellor

Barbara Ross OBE
- Born: 1929; Essex, England
- Died: 16 February 2015 (aged 85–86); Stoke Holy Cross, Norfolk, England
- Occupation(s): Social worker; gender counsellor
- Organization(s): OASIS (founder); The Barbara Ross Association
- Known for: Work with LGBT people in Norfolk
- Honours: OBE "for services to Gender Dysphoria"

Barbara Ross (1929 – 16 February 2015) was a social worker and gender counsellor, noted for her work for the LGBT community in Norfolk.

== Early life ==
Barbara Gladys Ross was born in Essex in 1929, and moved to London on marrying her first husband. She qualified as a social worker, gaining significant experience in London's East End between 1950 and 1970.

Ross moved to Norfolk in 1970 with her second husband, and lived in the village of Stoke Holy Cross.

== Career ==
In 1974, Ross' career in gender counselling began with a referral from a fellow social worker, who asked her to see "a strange young man who is probably gay". This individual's gender dysphoria, and subsequent death by suicide, prompted Ross' efforts to provide focused support for transgender people.

Ross founded the Norfolk-based Gender Identity Services, through which she worked to provide medical advice and psychological support. In the early 1980s, she founded OASIS: a support group for trans people and their partners, family and friends, providing an environment of mutual support and friendship.

In 2001, Ross organised the first International Transgender Conference, held at the University of East Anglia. This developed into a biennial series, bringing together experts from across the world. The Barbara Ross Association was established in 2009 to continue Ross' work, including the running of the Transgender Conferences and Oasis. The conferences continued until 2016.

In 2007, Ross was nominated for the Outstanding Achiever of the Year 2006 award, one of the Department of Health's annual Health and Social Care Awards. In 2011, she received an OBE "for services to Gender Dysphoria".

== Legacy ==
In 2021, Ross was among the women selected by Norwich-based group Rosie's Plaques to be featured on stones painted and left around the city, honouring local women on International Women's Day. In 2024, theatre and activist group The Common Lot named an alley for Ross as part of the project "Rename the Streets!".
