= George Bunn (lawyer) =

American judge

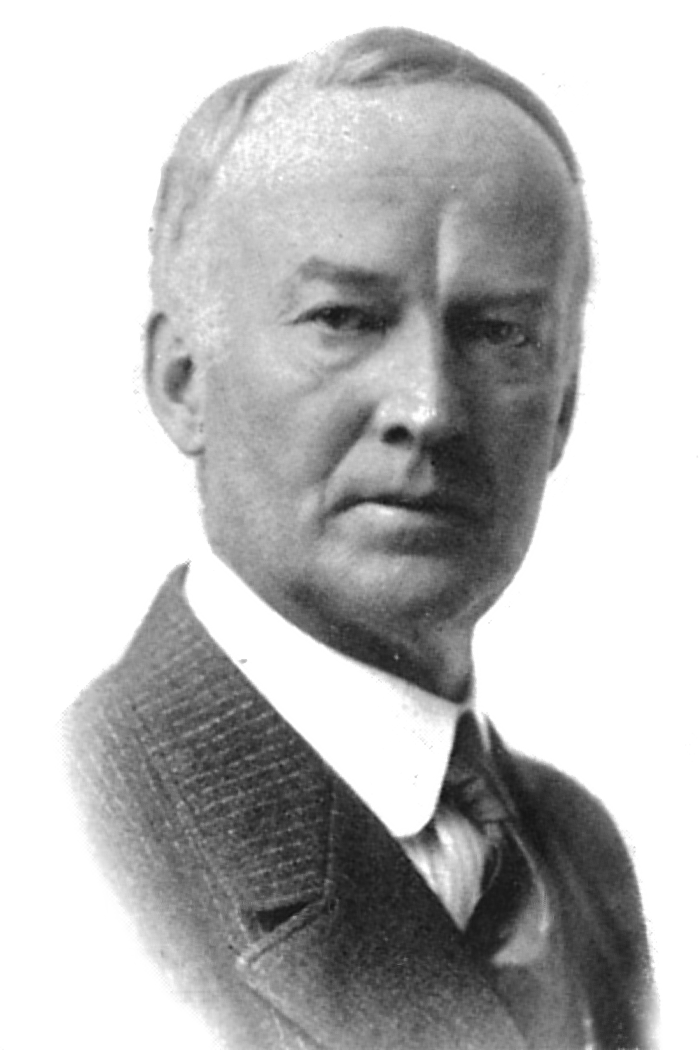

George Lincoln Bunn (June 25, 1865 – October 9, 1918) was an American lawyer, judge, and academic from Minnesota. He served as a justice of the Minnesota Supreme Court and dean of William Mitchell College of Law.

Bunn was born in Sparta, Wisconsin. His father Romanzo Bunn was both a Wisconsin Court of Appeals justice and a United States federal judge in Wisconsin, which influenced him to practice law. He received both his undergraduate and law degrees from the University of Wisconsin, in 1885 and 1888.

Bunn moved to St. Paul, Minnesota after graduating from law school and worked in private practice until 1897. That year, Governor David Marston Clough appointed him to a judgeship in Ramsey County. In 1911, Governor Adolph Olson Eberhart appointed him to the Minnesota Supreme Court. From 1904 until his death in 1918, Bunn served as dean of the St. Paul College of Law, the first predecessor of William Mitchell College of Law.
