= Stan Bunn =

American politician (born 1946)

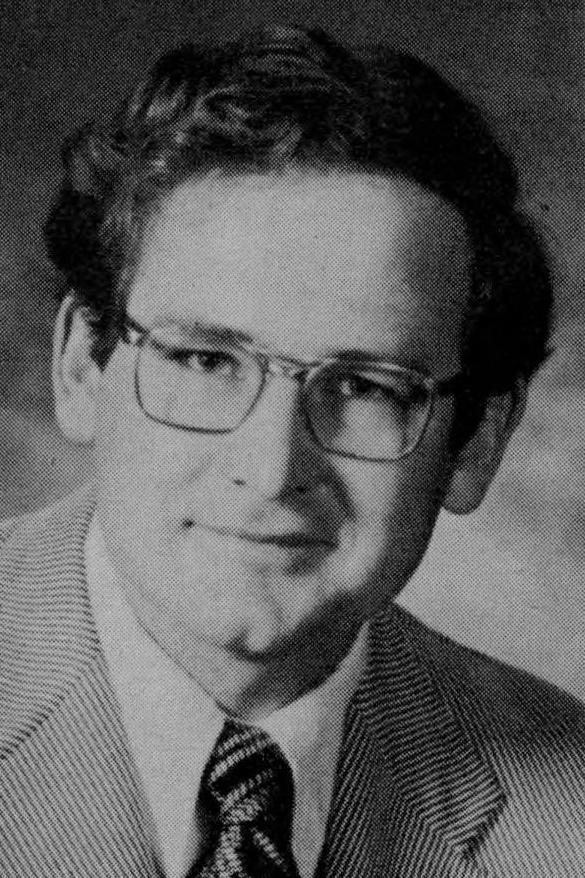

Oregon Superintendent of Public Instruction
- In office January 4, 1999 – January 5, 2003
- Governor: John Kitzhaber
- Preceded by: Norma Paulus
- Succeeded by: Susan Castillo

Oregon State Senator
- In office 1992–1997
- Preceded by: John Brenneman
- Succeeded by: Gary George
- Constituency: District 2

Member of the Oregon House of Representatives
- In office 1973 – 1976; 1985 – 1992
- Succeeded by: Bill Rutherford (1977–84)

Personal details
- Born: June 25, 1946 (age 80) Dayton, Oregon
- Party: Republican
- Spouse: Mary Bunn (divorced 1991)
- Relations: Jim Bunn; Tom Bunn
- Children: 2
- Occupation: Attorney

Stan Bunn (born June 25, 1946) is an American politician and lawyer in the U.S. state of Oregon. Born and raised in Yamhill County, he is part of a political family that includes his brother Jim Bunn who served in Congress. A self-described moderate Republican, Stan served in both houses of the Oregon Legislative Assembly, including a successful run for the Oregon House of Representatives while in law school in 1972. Later he served as Oregon Superintendent of Public Instruction from 1999 to 2003, in a political career spanning four decades. In non-elective offices, he was chairman of the state's ethics commission and on the Oregon Traffic Safety Commission between stints in the legislature.

Bunn also made unsuccessful attempts to be elected as Oregon Attorney General in 1976 and to serve in Congress representing Oregon's first congressional district in 1996, when his brother was running for re-election in the neighboring Congressional district. Bunn faced scrutiny over back taxes while Superintendent of Public Instruction and also was accused of committing over one thousand ethics violations by the Oregon Government Ethics Commission, stemming primarily from the use of a state car and use of a state cell phone for personal use. Bunn challenged their findings and later reached a settlement in which he did not admit wrongdoing and paid $25,000 to the Commission in a payment that could not be called a fine.

== Early life ==
Stan Bunn was born in McMinnville, Yamhill County, Oregon, on June 25, 1946. One of eleven children in the family with five brothers and five sisters, he was the fourth oldest of Ben and Viola (Fulgham) Bunn's children. His grandfather was once mayor of Lafayette, Oregon, and his father was on the city's school board. He was raised on a dairy near Dayton, Oregon, and went to school at Lafayette Grade School and later Dayton High School.

In high school he wrestled and was a member of the Future Farmers of America, where he raised pigs. At 16 years old, he purchased his first piece of property, a vacant lot in Lafayette. He also persuaded his parents to co-sign on a loan in order for him to buy cattle that year. Soon afterwards, he purchased a used mobile home, his first rental property. The 6' 2" tall student also was class president his senior year, graduating in 1964.

After high school he attended Willamette University in Salem, Oregon, where he majored in economics. Bunn paid for much of the tuition to the small liberal arts school with the funds he earned raising hogs. He served as a page at the 1964 Republican National Convention in San Francisco, which led to an internship with Oregon Senator Mark Hatfield in Washington, DC. During his internship Bunn tutored inner city kids there, which helped shape his political views. "I believed until then that anybody could bootstrap themselves, but I came to believe that the social problems we face need to be dealt with by government." Bunn graduated from Willamette in 1969 with a bachelor of arts degree and then enrolled at Willamette's law school.

During his third and final year of law school in 1972, he ran for a seat in the Oregon House of Representatives as a Republican, to represent Yamhill County. He won the five-person primary, and then won the general election in November. After winning the seat, Democrats challenged Bunn's residency in the district, since he was attending law school in Salem. The challenge failed, and he was sworn in as a 26-year-old legislator in January 1973, while still a law student. Bunn then wrote his third year law school paper on residency requirements. He graduated cum laude from Willamette with a Juris Doctor degree in 1973.

Following law school Bunn began practicing law in Newberg. There he built a practice that expanded to as many as eight lawyers and two offices. He later sold the practice after his election to a statewide office in 1998. Bunn also continued expanding his real estate holdings and owned as many as 14 rental properties. He lived in Yamhill County during these times, first in his hometown of Dayton and later near Newberg.

== Political career ==
Bunn's political career began with his election to the Oregon House in 1972 to represent District 29 and parts of Yamhill, Polk, and Marion counties. He won re-election to a second two-year term in 1974 and served through the 1975 special session of the legislature. In 1973 during this time in the Oregon House, he was the only Republican there who voted against a resolution that praised Republican U.S. President Richard Nixon after Nixon ended the war in Vietnam. He also worked to pass legislation in 1975 to create the Willamette Greenway, and to make the state's laws tougher against drunk drivers.

In 1976, Bunn then ran to serve as the Oregon Attorney General, but lost in the Republican primary, coming in third, and did not run for re-election to the House. After leaving the House he served as chairperson of the Oregon Government Ethics Commission from 1979 to 1981 and was on the Oregon Traffic Safety Commission. He remained out of elected office until he was elected to the Oregon House again in 1984. Representing District 29, he won re-election to successive two-year terms in 1986, 1988, and 1990. In July 1987, Republicans appointed his brother Jim to the Oregon State Senate, a seat Stan had hoped to be appointed to instead.

The seat became open when Tony Meeker was appointed as Oregon State Treasurer. Stan considered challenging his brother in the primary election the following May, but declined and ran for re-election in the House. The possible contest between brothers created some tension in the family. In August 1987, Stan declined to pursue the House Minority Leader position after Larry Campbell left the position. Bunn then ran in the 1992 election to replace John Brenneman in Oregon Senate District 2, where Bunn then lived after redistricting. On July 2, 1992, he was appointed to the position when Brenneman resigned from the seat. His younger brother Tom was appointed to the House to fill Stan's seat the next day, which lead to three Bunns serving in the Oregon Legislative Assembly simultaneously.

Bunn won the November 1992 election and the four-year term in the Senate. He served through the 1996 special session representing parts of Yamhill, Lincoln, Polk, Lane, and Tillamook counties. While in the legislature this second time, he went against his party and voted to place a Democrat on the Northwest Power Planning Council, with his vote the decisive vote. Other work included writing and passing welfare reform to move recipients into the workforce and medical insurance portability for employees, both in 1995. Later legislator Larry George described Bunn as "...more of a stoic character, more standoffish..." while fellow legislator Bill Bradbury said "[h]e really does absorb the facts of a situation,' and not just have an ideological view to it." Bunn himself described his views as moderate.

In 1996, Stan ran in the Republican primary to represent Oregon's 1st congressional district, at a time when his brother Jim was running for re-election in Oregon's 5th Congressional district. One of six Republicans in the primary, he finished third in the race with Bill Witt winning the party's nomination. During his campaign, he teamed up with his brother to run a joint commercial featuring two talking hamburger buns with the tag line "We just have to get our Bunns to Washington".

=== State school superintendent ===
Bunn returned to politics in February 1998 to run for the non-partisan Oregon Superintendent of Public Instruction to replace the retiring Norma Paulus as head of the Oregon Department of Education. He was one of sixteen candidates in the May primary, finishing first and faced Democratic Senator Margaret Carter in a runoff in the November 1998 election. Bunn's campaign focused on stabilizing funding for schools, continuing school reform, reducing class sizes, and supporting charter schools, but not school voucher programs. He spent over $100,000 of his own money in winning the position, defeating Carter 522,263 votes to 412,235 votes.

Bunn took office on January 4, 1999, with plans to reduce class sizes, increase teacher training, create a reserve fund to help stabilize school funding, and work to better the relationship between teachers' unions and the Department of Education. He also supported the concept of charter schools as long as local schools retained control of those schools. While in office, the state adopted legislation to allow for charter schools in 1999.

Bunn also proposed changing the state's certificate of initial mastery (CIM) to a program with seven separate CIMs, but the Oregon State Board of Education declined to adopt his proposal.

In 2001, potential ethics violations arose over use of a state cell phone and state vehicle for personal use. Soon after, a previously tabled bill in the legislature that would change Bunn's office to an appointed position in lieu of an election was reintroduced. The legislation never made it into law. While an ethics investigation was pending, it came to light in 2001 that Bunn was delinquent on almost $15,000 in property taxes. The taxes were owed in two counties, some as far back as 1997, with one property facing foreclosure by the county. County records disclosed a pattern of late payments on property taxes dating to as early as 1992. Bunn paid all the back taxes, including interest, and apologized for the transgression, blaming it partly on a change of address due to selling his law firm and on not having the money after leaving private legal practice.

=== Ethics investigation and Boy Scouts controversy ===
In August 2001, Oregon's ethics commission began a formal investigation of the accusations against Bunn for using his office for personal gain. Bunn denied any wrongdoing and expected to be cleared by the commission where he was once chairman. The investigation focused on his use of a state issued cell phone, a state owned automobile, travel expenses, long-distance telephone calls, and even use of frequent flyer miles earned while traveling for state business. They also examined whether he used his office to continue his legal practice. His department was also undergoing a state audit at the time over concerns of lack of oversight on state issued contracts.

Meanwhile, an Oregon circuit court judge ruled against Bunn's decision to allow Boy Scouts to recruit at public school. Judge Ellen Rosenblum determined Bunn had abused his discretion in not finding evidence that the group discriminated against those who did not believe in God. Thus, state antidiscrimination laws prohibited the group from recruiting at schools, and Bunn was ordered to alter the policy that allowed the Boy Scouts to recruit in schools.

Regarding the ethics complaint, the state commission determined Bunn made 1,433 violations of the ethics laws and faced up to a $1,000 fine for each violation as well as a fine for as much as double the value of the improper benefits. The commission also removed 1,334 of the charges made against Bunn. Bunn had reimbursed the state for many of the personal expenses and returned the state car and state cell phone after the improprieties were discovered by The Oregonian newspaper. Some of the long-distance phone calls at issue were to his ex-wife, who also worked for the Department of Education in the same building as Bunn. There was also a charge he used his office to get a free trip to Los Angeles for his daughter. He drew further scrutiny when he mailed his defense of the allegations to state legislators using state funds and letterhead, which led to another ethics complaint.

Bunn did not accept the findings of the commission, so the commission sued to enforce the findings in court. While the legal action was in progress, the ethics commission decided to pursue the allegations against Bunn concerning the free trip for his daughter, but declined to investigate the mailing incident. Ultimately, Bunn and the ethics commission reached a settlement on all the allegations with Bunn paying $25,000 to the commission. Federal judge Robert E. Jones mediated the settlement where Bunn did not admit to any violations, and the $25,000 could not be characterized as a penalty.

In March 2002, he filed to run for re-election to his office while the ethics case against him was still pending. Bunn was optimistic the investigation would exonerate him and that voters would focus on his record instead of the ethics issues. He ran against State Senator Susan Castillo and Rob Kremer in the May primary, and finished a distant third to Castillo with 114,203 votes to her 406,247. Castillo won enough votes to avoid a runoff in the November general election and took over for Bunn on January 5, 2003.

== Later life ==
Bunn married Mary and they had two children: his son Michael and daughter Kristine. The couple divorced in 1991, and Stan did not remarry, but maintained joint-custody of the children. As of 2002, Bunn lived in Newberg. There he taught law and government at George Fox University for five years.
