= Jim Bunn =

American politician (born 1956)

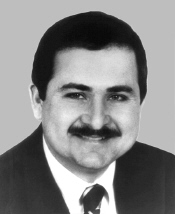

Member of the U.S. House of Representatives from Oregon's 5th district
- In office January 3, 1995 – January 3, 1997
- Preceded by: Michael J. Kopetski
- Succeeded by: Darlene Hooley

Member of the Oregon Senate from the 15th district
- In office 1987–1995
- Preceded by: Tony Meeker
- Succeeded by: Marylin Shannon

Personal details
- Born: December 12, 1956 (age 69) McMinnville, Oregon, U.S.
- Party: Republican
- Spouse(s): Cindy Bunn (m. 1978–1995) Sonja Skurdal
- Relatives: Stan Bunn (brother); Tom Bunn (brother)
- Education: Chemeketa Community College; Northwest Nazarene University (BA)

James Lee Bunn (born December 12, 1956) is an American politician from Oregon. A native of Yamhill County, he served in the Oregon State Senate before election to the United States House of Representatives, where he served for one term before losing re-election. A Republican, he now works as a correctional officer for the county.

== Early life and education ==
James Lee Bunn was born in McMinnville and graduated from Dayton High School. He earned a Bachelor of Arts degree from Northwestern Nazarene College in 1979, and remains a member of the Church of the Nazarene.

== Career ==
Bunn worked in agribusiness, and from 1987 until his election to Congress, served in the Oregon National Guard. A Republican, he was a member of the Oregon State Senate from 1987 to 1995, where he served as Republican whip from 1990 to 1995.

=== United States House of Representatives ===
In 1994, he was elected to the United States House of Representatives, representing Oregon's 5th congressional district. During his one term in the House from 1995 to 1997, Bunn divorced his wife of 17 years, with whom he had five children, and married Sonja Skurdal, an aide in his congressional office whom he made his chief of staff. Bunn then paid Skurdal more than any other congressional aide in Oregon at that time. In the 1996 election, this scandal contributed to his loss to Democrat Darlene Hooley.

=== Later career ===
After leaving Congress, Bunn became a sheriff's deputy at the Yamhill County jail. In 2008, he was a candidate for the Oregon House of Representatives in the state's 24th district which includes McMinnville, but was defeated in the primary by Jim Weidner.

Bunn ran again for congress in 2022 but came in 5th in the primary out of 7 candidates.

== Personal life ==
Bunn's family includes other notable public figures, such as his brother Stan Bunn, a former Oregon superintendent of public instruction and member of both houses of the state legislature. Another brother, Tom Bunn, is a former Yamhill County commissioner and was briefly a state senator. All three brothers served in the legislature for a short time in from July 1992 to January 1993.

U.S. House of Representatives
Preceded by Michael J. Kopetski	Member of the U.S. House of Representatives from Oregon's 5th congressional district 1995–1997	Succeeded by Darlene Hooley
U.S. order of precedence (ceremonial)
Preceded by Jason Lewis as Former U.S. Representative	Order of precedence of the United States as Former U.S. Representative	Succeeded by Vince Snowbarger as Former U.S. Representative
