= First ladies and gentlemen of Oregon =

Spouses of the governors of Oregon, US

First Lady of Oregon
- Seal of Oregon
- Current; Aimee Kotek Wilson since January 9, 2023
- Style: Mrs. Wilson; Madam First Lady
- Residence: Mahonia Hall
- Inaugural holder: Nancy Jane Whiteaker (as first lady); Frank Roberts (as first gentleman)
- Formation: July 8, 1858 (168 years ago)
- Website: Official website

First lady or first gentleman of Oregon is the title attributed to the wife or husband of the governor of Oregon. The holder of the title resides with the governor at the Governor's Mansion in Salem, Oregon.

The current first lady is Aimee Kotek Wilson, wife of Governor Tina Kotek, who has held the position since January 9, 2023. To date, only two people has served as the first gentleman since statehood: Frank Roberts from 1991 to 1995 and Dan Little 2015 to 2023.

== List of first ladies and gentlemen of Oregon ==
=== Provisional Government of Oregon ===
Name	Image	Term	Governor	Notes
Anne Pope Abernethy		June 3, 1845 – March 3, 1849	George Abernethy	

=== Territory of Oregon ===
Name	Image	Term	Governor	Notes
Polly Hart Lane		March 3, 1849 – June 18, 1850	Joseph Lane	
Unknown		June 18, 1850 – August 18, 1850	Kintzing Prichette	
Margaret B. Wands Gaines		August 18, 1850 – May 16, 1853	John P. Gaines	
Polly Hart Lane (Acting)		May 16, 1853 – May 19, 1853	Joseph Lane (Acting)	
Chloe Boone (Acting)		May 19, 1853 – December 2, 1853	George Law Curry (Acting)	
Ann Hoover		May 14, 1853 – August 1, 1854	John Wesley Davis	
Chloe Boone		August 1, 1854 – March 3, 1859	George Law Curry	

=== State of Oregon ===
First Lady/Gentlemen	Image	Term	Governor	Notes
Nancy Jane Whiteaker		July 8, 1858 – September 10, 1862	John Whiteaker	
Unknown		September 10, 1862 – September 12, 1866	A. C. Gibbs	
Louisa A. McBride		September 12, 1866 – September 14, 1870	George Lemuel Woods	
Elizabeth Carter		September 14, 1870 – February 1, 1877	La Fayette Grover	
Jane A. Smith		February 1, 1877 – September 11, 1878	Stephen F. Chadwick	
Samantha C. Thayer		September 11, 1878 – September 13, 1882	W. W. Thayer	
Mary Stephenson		September 13, 1882 – January 12, 1887	Zenas Ferry Moody	
Mary A. Allen		January 12, 1887 – January 14, 1895	Sylvester Pennoyer	
Juliette Montague		February 14, 1900 – March 27, 1903	William Paine Lord	
Nancy Batte Duncan		January 9, 1899 – January 14, 1903	Theodore Thurston Geer	
Sallie Newman Welch		January 15, 1903 – February 28, 1909	George Earle Chamberlain	
Vacant		February 27, 1909 – March 1, 1909	Carolyn B. Shelton (Acting)	
Harriet Ruth Benson		March 1, 1909 – June 17, 1910	Frank W. Benson	
Elizabeth Hoover Bowerman		June 17, 1910 – January 11, 1911	Jay Bowerman	
Mabel West		January 11, 1911 – January 12, 1915	Oswald West	
Isabel Withycombe		January 12, 1915 – March 3, 1919	James Withycombe	
Lena Olcott		March 3, 1919 – January 8, 1923	Ben W. Olcott	
Laura Rudio Pierce		January 8, 1923 – January 10, 1927	Walter M. Pierce	
Mary Elizabeth Woodworth		January 10, 1927 – December 21, 1929	I. L. Patterson	
Edna Lyle Norblad		December 21, 1929 – January 12, 1931	A. W. Norblad	
Grace Mayer		January 12, 1931 – January 14, 1935	Julius Meier	
Louise Hughes		January 14, 1935 – January 9, 1939	Charles Martin	
Blanche Chamberlain		January 9, 1939 – January 11, 1943	Charles A. Sprague	
Edith Welshons		January 11, 1943 – October 28, 1947	Earl Snell	
Elizabeth Walch		October 30, 1947 – January 10, 1949	John Hubert Hall	
Mabel Hill		January 10, 1949 – December 27, 1952	Douglas McKay	
Georgia Patterson		December 27, 1952 – January 31, 1956	Paul L. Patterson	
Dorothy Smith		January 31, 1956 – January 14, 1957	Elmo Smith	
Marie Hoy Holmes		January 14, 1957 – January 12, 1959	Robert D. Holmes	
Antoinette Kuzmanich		January 3, 1995 – January 3, 1997	Mark Hatfield	
Audrey McCall		January 9, 1967 – January 13, 1975	Tom McCall	Like her husband, a Republican environmental activist.
Pat Straub		January 13, 1975 – January 8, 1979	Robert W. Straub	
Dolores Atiyeh		January 8, 1979 – January 12, 1987	Victor Atiyeh	Healthcare activist responsible for one of the nation's first seat belt laws.
Margaret Wood Goldschmidt		January 12, 1987 – 1990	Neil Goldschmidt	
Frank L. Roberts		January 14, 1991 – January 9, 1995	Barbara Roberts	Member of the Oregon House of Representatives and the Oregon State Senate. First man to hold the title of First Gentleman of Oregon.
Sharon LaCroix		January 9, 1995 – January 13, 2003	John Kitzhaber	
Mary Oberst		January 13, 2003 – January 10, 2011	Ted Kulongoski	
Cylvia Hayes		January 10, 2011 – February 18, 2015	John Kitzhaber	Subject of the influence peddling scandal leading to the resignation of Governor Kitzhaber.
Dan Little		February 18, 2015 – January 10, 2023	Kate Brown	Second man to hold the title of First Gentleman of Oregon.
Aimee Kotek Wilson		January 10, 2023 – present	Tina Kotek	First openly lesbian first lady of Oregon.

== See also ==
- List of governors of Oregon
- Governor of Oregon
