= Aimee Kotek Wilson =

First Lady of Oregon since 2023

- Kotek Wilson in 2026

First Lady of Oregon
- Incumbent
- Assumed role January 9, 2023
- Governor: Tina Kotek
- Preceded by: Dan Little (as first gentleman)

Personal details
- Born: Aimee Wilson
- Party: Democratic
- Spouse: Tina Kotek (m. 2017)
- Education: Antioch College (BA); Portland State University (MSW)
- Occupation: Social worker

Aimee Kotek Wilson (née Wilson) is an American social worker who has served as first lady of Oregon since 2023 as the wife of Governor Tina Kotek.

== Early life and education ==
Kotek Wilson was raised in a family involved in public service. Her father served in the military, later entered business, and held elected office. She earned a bachelor's degree (BA) from Antioch College and, after a 17-year gap in her education, completed a master of social work (MSW) at Portland State University. She has spoken about being a non-traditional student and overcoming an undiagnosed learning disability in adulthood.

== Career ==
Kotek Wilson began her career in Oregon as a community organizer, focusing on public assistance programs, LGBTQ campus climate, and workplace issues for state employees. She worked to connect low-income residents, students, and union members with lawmakers to encourage civic participation.

She held positions in state government, including at the Oregon Secretary of State's office, contributing to the development of Oregon's online voter registration system, and later serving as an advisor to legislative leadership in the Oregon House of Representatives.

== First Lady of Oregon (2023–present) ==
Kotek Wilson became first lady of Oregon on January 9, 2023, when her wife Tina Kotek was sworn in as governor. She is the first openly lesbian first lady in Oregon history.

In May 2025, Kotek Wilson was appointed chair of the Behavioral Health Talent Council, a body established to address Oregon's behavioral health workforce shortage. The 22-member council is tasked with developing a workforce action plan focused on recruitment, retention, diversity, and competency in behavioral health services.

She has participated in initiatives related to mental health, public engagement, and literacy, including a statewide early childhood literacy event in May 2025. In September 2025, she accompanied Governor Kotek on an official trade mission to Japan and South Korea.

=== Advocacy ===
In April 2025, Kotek Wilson testified before the Oregon House Judiciary Committee in support of House Bill 2467, legislation that would make it easier for officials to civilly commit individuals experiencing mental health crises who pose a danger to themselves or others. Before her testimony, she registered as a lobbyist for the governor's office in relation to the bill.

=== Controversies ===
Kotek Wilson's role in the governor's office has drawn controversy over the scope of her role and state ethics laws. In July 2024, the Oregon Government Ethics Commission stated that state ethics law does not prevent a first spouse from volunteering in the administration, provided there is no personal financial gain. This followed the departure of several senior staff members and public concerns about her influence in the office.

In response to these concerns, Governor Kotek announced she would not create a formal "Office of the First Spouse" following internal and public criticism regarding Kotek Wilson's role. She apologized for how she had approached expanding her wife's responsibilities. She stated that while Kotek Wilson would continue to accompany her and attend ceremonial events, no staff would report to her. Kotek also confirmed that Kotek Wilson would retain access to an office in the governor's suite but reiterated that there would be no formal office for the first spouse during her tenure.

In September 2024, the governor's office released a "First Partner Handbook" outlining the role and ethics guidance for the position. The handbook noted that each first spouse may determine their level of involvement, but did not provide detailed procedures for structuring the role or handling workplace concerns.

== Personal life ==
Kotek Wilson and her wife Tina Kotek met in 2005 and married in a private ceremony in 2017, following the legalization of same-sex marriage in Oregon. They lived together in Portland before moving to the governor's residence, Mahonia Hall, in Salem when her wife took office in 2023.

Honorary titles
Preceded by Dan Little as First Gentleman	First Lady of Oregon; January 9, 2023 – present	Incumbent
