= Dolores Atiyeh =

American healthcare activist and First Lady of Oregon

First Lady of Oregon
- In role January 8, 1979 – January 12, 1987
- Governor: Victor Atiyeh
- Preceded by: Pat Straub
- Succeeded by: Margaret Wood Goldschmidt

Personal details
- Born: Dolores Hewitt; November 8, 1923 Portland, Oregon, U.S.
- Died: August 29, 2016 (aged 92) Portland, Oregon, U.S.
- Spouse: Victor Atiyeh (m. 1944; died 2014)
- Children: 2

Dolores Atiyeh (née Hewitt; November 8, 1923 – August 29, 2016) was an American healthcare activist and advocate for the arts who served as the First Lady of Oregon from 1979 until 1987 during the administration of her husband, Governor Vic Atiyeh. As First Lady, Atiyeh lobbied for House Bill 2139, a mandatory children's immunization bill, which was passed in 1981, and championed a proposed mandatory seat belt rule for children under 5-years-old. The mandatory seat belt rule for children, a controversial proposal in the 1980s, became law in 1983.

== Biography ==
Atiyeh was born Dolores Hewitt, on November 8, 1923, in Portland, Oregon. She graduated from Washington High School in Portland, where she also met and began dating her future husband, Victor Atiyeh. Following high school, both Hewitt and Atiyeh enrolled at the University of Oregon, where Hewitt studied art at the university's honors college. However, neither graduated from the University of Oregon due to the outbreak of World War II. The couple married on July 5, 1944, and later had two children, Tom and Suzanne.

Coinciding with her husband's career political career, Dolores Atiyeh developed her own charitable, social and volunteer work going back to the 1960s. She served as First Lady of Oregon from 1979 to 1987 during Governor Atiyeh's two terms in office. In addition to the more traditional roles as first lady, Atiyeh championed a range of policy issues related to health, safety, and the arts during her tenure. She helped to shepherd a mandatory children's immunization bill through Oregon legislature, which was signed into law in 1981. However, the first lady faced a tougher political fight over a proposed seat belt rule for children under 5-years-old during Governor Atiyeh's second term. The children's seat belt bill proved controversial, but ultimately passed in 1983 due to lobbying by First Lady Atiyeh. According to Denny Miles, Governor Atiyeh's former press secretary, the seat belt rule was "not a softball issue," but Atiyeh fought for its passage, noting "It's kind of controversial, and she took the lead."

Governor Victor Atiyeh credited his success as a state legislator and governor to Dolores Atiyeh. Atiyeh reportedly didn't always relish her role as a politician's wife, but she developed her own campaign style and often worked the room during a rally or fundraiser, a task that her husband did not always like to do. During the governor's 1982 re-election campaign, the first lady would put a sticker on the lapel or jacket of everyone in the room whom she spoke with. She could then easily identify anyone in the room whom she might have missed by checking for the stickers. She chaired the Governor's Conference on Historic Preservation in 1981 and served as honorary chairperson of the Oregon Citizens for Immunization Inc.

Closer to home, the Governor and First Lady lived in a rented home in Salem, Oregon, during their two terms. (Mahonia Hall, the official governor's residence, wasn't acquired until 1988, after they left office.) Atiyeh painted the home before moving into it. As the state's first lady, Dolores Atiyeh was expected to supply all of the serving ware, china, and utensils needed to host official state guests and functions, as these items were not provided by an official residence like other states. She later noted in a 1987 interview with The Oregonian, "It was my silver, my crystal, my dishes and my furniture." There was also no paid, official speechwriter or housekeepers at their home, so Atiyeh performed those tasks as well, in addition to her other duties as first lady, "There was almost no help with the housework. I kept books, answered letters, made speeches...I liked it, but it was physically difficult to keep up the pace without help."

Former Governor Atiyeh died in 2014 shortly after their 70th wedding anniversary. Dolores Atiyeh died from complications related to old age two years later at a nursing facility in Portland on August 29, 2016, at the age of 92. She was survived by her two children, Tom and Suzanne, and five grandchildren.

Dolores Atiyeh's papers and archives are housed at Pacific University as part of the Victor Atiyeh Collection.
