= Senator Roberts =

Senator Roberts may refer to:

== Members of the United States Senate ==
- Jonathan Roberts (politician) (1771–1854), U.S. Senator from Pennsylvania from 1814 to 1821
- Pat Roberts (born 1936), U.S. Senator from Kansas since 2011

== United States state senate members ==
- Adelbert H. Roberts (1866–1937), Illinois State Senate
- Betty Roberts (1923–2011), Oregon State Senate
- Clint Roberts (politician) (1935–2017), South Dakota State Senate
- Dennis J. Roberts (1903–1994), Rhode Island State Senate
- Elizabeth H. Roberts (born 1957), Rhode Island State Senate
- Ellen Roberts (born 1959), Colorado State Senate
- Ernest W. Roberts (1858–1924), Massachusetts State Senate
- Frank L. Roberts (1915–1993), Oregon State Senate
- Henry Roberts (governor) (1853–1929), Connecticut State Senate
- Kenneth A. Roberts (1912–1989), Alabama State Senate
- Kerry Roberts (born c. 1960), Tennessee State Senate
- Mary Wendy Roberts (born 1944), Oregon State Senate
- Ray Roberts (politician) (1913–1992), Texas State Senate
- Robert H. Roberts (1837–1888), New York State Senate
- Rollan Roberts, West Virginia State Senate
- Tom Roberts (Ohio politician) (born 1952), Ohio State Senate
- Tommy Ed Roberts (1940–2014), Alabama State Senate
