= Pat Straub =

First Lady of Oregon
- In role January 13, 1975 – January 8, 1979
- Governor: Bob Straub
- Preceded by: Audrey McCall
- Succeeded by: Dolores Atiyeh

Personal details
- Born: Pat Stroud; March 11, 1923; Villanova, Pennsylvania, U.S.
- Died: September 24, 2016 (aged 93); Springfield, Oregon, U.S.
- Spouse: Bob Straub (m. 1944; died 2002)
- Children: 6
- Occupation: Organic farmer Writer

Pat Straub (March 11, 1923 – September 24, 2016) was an American author and environmentalist. Straub pioneered organic gardening during the 1960s and 1970s, years before the concept became well known. She served as First Lady of the U.S. state of Oregon from 1975 until 1979 during the administration of her husband, Governor Bob Straub. She was later appointed to the Oregon Forestry Council.

== Biography ==
Straub was born Pat Stroud on March 11, 1923, in Villanova, Pennsylvania. She was the youngest of the five children of Willa Bolton (née Dixon) Stroud and Morris Wistar Stroud. One of her brothers, Dick Stroud, later founded Stroud Water Research Center, a freshwater research group based in Avondale, Pennsylvania, in 1967.

She first met her future husband, Robert W. Straub, during the early 1940s while she was a Smith College freshman working as a camp counselor on Mount Moosilauke in New Hampshire. Bob Straub, a then-sophomore at Dartmouth College, was hiking up the mountain at the time. The couple married in 1943, shortly before Bob Straub was sent to the European theatre with the United States Army Quartermaster Corps during World War II. In 1946, following the end of the war, the family moved to Springfield, Oregon, where Bob Straub worked at a new Weyerhauser facility there. The couple had six children.

Pat Straub pioneered organic gardening years before the term or concept of organic horticulture became widely known to the general public. In 1974, shortly before becoming the state's first lady, Straub published, "From the Loving Earth", a book which covered organic farming without chemicals, cooking, food preservation.

=== First Lady of Oregon ===
Straub served as the First Lady of Oregon from January 1975 until January 1979 during the single term of Governor Bob Straub. During her tenure, Straub edited Governor Straub's speeches. She also wrote a regular column in The Oregon Statesman and other newspapers, which focused on her official and personal experiences as the state's first lady.

Straub also planned official functions, menus, and guests, at their private residence, a farmhouse built in 1860 in the west Salem Hills outside Salem, as Oregon did not have a governor's residence or provide official residential staff for state governors or first ladies at the time. (Mahonia Hall, the present-day governor's home, was not acquired until the late 1980s.) Straub, by then a veteran of organic gardening, grew and cooked the produce for official dinners and baked bread on the farmhouse's wood-burning stove. Eggs from chickens raised by Pat Straub became a sought after item in the state capital. They proved so popular that Barbara Hanneman, Governor Straub's personal assistant, had to keep a record of who had received the first lady's organic chicken eggs.

Straub publicly supported her husband's environmental policies and initiatives, including Senate Bill 100's land-use plans, originally conceived by Governor Tom McCall) and a series of innovative state energy efficiency programs. However, Straub rejected calls to run for political office herself.

=== Later life ===
After leaving office, Pat and Bob Straub owned and operated several farms scattered throughout the Willamette Valley, specifically the Mid-Valley, of central Oregon. They championed strongly conservationist and pro-environmental policy issues. The couple donated ten acres of one of their farmers to the city of Salem, Oregon, which is now known as the Bob & Pat Straub Nature Park. They were also the catalyst behind the Straub Environmental Center, a facility owned by the Salem-Keizer School District.

Pat Straub also served on the Oregon Forestry Council. She became a watercolorist and painter later in her life.

Pat Straub died from complications of old age at the Gateway Living Residential Center in Springfield, Oregon, on September 24, 2016, at the age of 93. She was survived by five of her children - Jane Straub, Patty Straub Thomas, Peg Straub, Jeff Straub, and Mike Straub; 14 grandchildren, 31 grandchildren and three great-grandchildren. She was predeceased by her husband, former Governor Bob Straub, who died in November 2002, and one of her six children. A memorial service was held at the Northwest Youth Corps center on October 22, 2016.

Straub's death came less than one month after the passing of her successor, former Oregon First Lady Dolores Atiyeh.
