= Frank L. Roberts =

American politician (1915–1993)

Frank Roberts

First Gentleman of Oregon
- In role January 14, 1991 – October 31, 1993
- Governor: Barbara Roberts
- Preceded by: Margaret Goldschmidt (1990)
- Succeeded by: Sharon LaCroix Kitzhaber (1995)

Member of the Oregon Senate from the 9th district
- In office 1975–1993
- Preceded by: Thomas R. Mahoney
- Succeeded by: Randy Leonard

Member of the Oregon House of Representatives from the 6th district
- In office 1967–1971
- Preceded by: Candidates elected at-large
- Succeeded by: Glenn Otto

Personal details
- Born: Frank Livezey Roberts; December 28, 1915 Boise, Idaho, U.S.
- Died: October 31, 1993 (aged 77) Salem, Oregon, U.S.
- Party: Democratic
- Spouses: Mary Louise (m. 1943–1960) Betty Cantrell (m. 1960–1965) Barbara Hughey (m. 1974)
- Children: Mary Wendy Roberts; Leslie Roberts
- Profession: Politician

Frank Livezey Roberts (December 28, 1915 – October 31, 1993) was an American politician who served as first gentleman of Oregon from 1991 to 1993 as husband of Governor Barbara Roberts. A member of the Democratic Party, Roberts served in both houses of the Oregon Legislative Assembly. He served two terms in the Oregon House of Representatives and most of five terms in the Oregon Senate before resigning due to poor health. Roberts was married three times, including to Barbara Roberts, who was the first woman to serve as Governor of Oregon, and to Betty Roberts, who was the first woman to serve as a justice of the Oregon Supreme Court. Roberts is the first man to serve as first gentleman of Oregon.

== Early life and career ==
Roberts was born in Boise, Idaho, in 1915 to Walter Scott and Mary Livezey Roberts. He received a bachelor's degree from Pacific University in Forest Grove, Oregon in 1938. In 1943, he married Mary Louise Charleson. Later that year, he earned a master's degree from the University of Wisconsin–Madison. In 1946, he was hired as a speech professor at Vanport College (later renamed Portland State University). He earned a doctorate from Stanford University in 1954.

Roberts and his wife Mary Louise had two daughters, Mary Wendy Roberts and Leslie Roberts. The couple divorced prior to 1960, the year Frank married Betty Cantrell Rice, then a single mother of four and teacher in Portland.

== Early political career ==
In 1960, Roberts was elected chairman of the Multnomah County Democratic Party. He ran unsuccessfully for the Oregon State Senate in 1962, but was successful in his second attempt at elective office, winning a seat in the Oregon House of Representatives in 1966. He was re-elected to a second term, but in 1970, redistricting forced him to run in another district and he lost in the Democratic primary. Roberts again unsuccessfully sought election to the Oregon House in 1972, but when an open Senate seat was available in 1974, he was elected to the first of six four-year terms representing District 4 in Portland. At the time of his retirement in 1993, Roberts was the longest-serving Oregon legislator.

As a legislator, Roberts served on the Ways and Means Committee. He worked to expand social service programs for the poor, disabled, and elderly, expanding Head Start Programs to more children, and funding more medical care programs, such as prenatal care, to the poor.

== Later career ==
Roberts and his second wife, Betty Roberts, divorced in 1965. She was elected to the Oregon House of Representatives in 1964, and was later elected to the Oregon State Senate in 1969. In 1974, she ran unsuccessfully for both Governor of Oregon and as a replacement candidate for U.S. Senate. Betty later resigned from the Oregon Senate when she was appointed as a judge on the Oregon Court of Appeals, and later was the first woman to serve on the Oregon Supreme Court.

Frank Roberts' daughter, Mary Wendy Roberts, also served in the Oregon House from 1973–75 and the State Senate from 1975–79, and served alongside her father and stepmother, Betty, for several years before being elected into statewide office as Commissioner of the Oregon Bureau of Labor and Industries. Frank and Mary Wendy were the first, and to date, only, father-daughter team to serve simultaneously in the Oregon Legislative Assembly.

In 1971, Roberts met Barbara Hughey Sanders, a single mother with an autistic son, who was lobbying for the right of disabled students to attend public schools. Roberts sponsored Sanders' bill, and befriended and married her in 1974. Barbara Roberts was elected to the Oregon House of Representatives in 1980, Oregon Secretary of State in 1984 and 1988, and became Oregon's 34th governor in 1990.

== Later life ==
Roberts had a heart attack in 1984, and was diagnosed with lung cancer in 1987. Radiation treatment for his cancer destroyed the nerves in his legs and rendered him unable to walk. In 1993, with his cancer spread to his lungs, Roberts, then the longest-serving member of the Oregon Legislative Assembly, resigned from the Oregon Senate on September 1. He died at Mahonia Hall, Oregon's governor's residence, on October 31.
