= Audrey McCall =

American activist, environmentalist and politician

First Lady of Oregon
- In role January 9, 1967 – January 13, 1975
- Governor: Tom McCall
- Preceded by: Antoinette Hatfield
- Succeeded by: Pat Straub

Personal details
- Born: Audrey Grace Owen; February 26, 1915 Spokane, Washington, U.S.
- Died: November 15, 2007 (aged 92) Portland, Oregon, U.S.
- Spouse(s): Tom McCall (m. 1939–1983; his death)
- Children: Tad McCall; Sam McCall

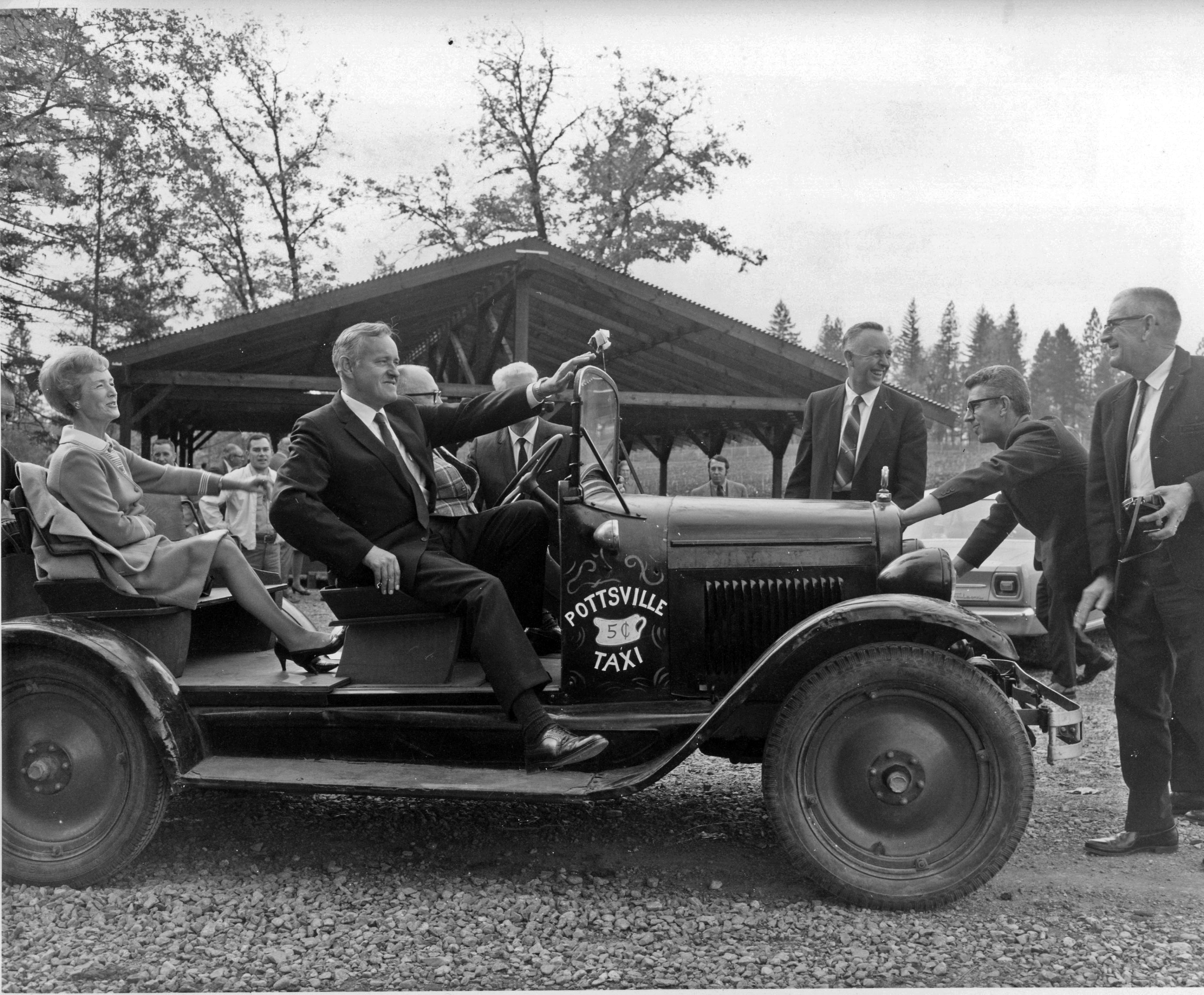
Audrey McCall at the Tree Seed Orchard Dedication

Audrey Grace McCall (née Owen; February 26, 1915 – November 15, 2007) was an American activist, environmentalist, politician, and former First Lady of Oregon from January 9, 1967, until January 13, 1975. The widow of former Governor Tom McCall, she became one of the most politically influential first ladies and former first ladies in Oregon's history. Following her husband's death in 1983, Audrey McCall championed a variety of political, social and environmental issues throughout the state. In particular, McCall sought to protect and expand the sweeping statewide land-use laws that had been implemented and signed into law by Governor McCall. She campaigned and fundraised on behalf of both Democratic and Republican political candidates.

In 2017, Audrey McCall Beach, downtown Portland's newly constructed urban beach along the Willamette River, was named in honor of the former first lady.

== Biography ==
McCall was born Audrey Grace Owen in Spokane, Washington, on February 26, 1915. Her mother sold real estate, while her father worked as a wholesaler grocer.

Owen initially enrolled as a student at Washington State University, but left school to take a job offer as a home economist for Washington Water Power, based in Moscow, Idaho. Part of her new job required her to conduct cooking demonstrations and classes utilizing modern electric stoves. Owen was holding one of those classes when she met Tom McCall, a local reporter for the News-Review who had been assigned to pen a story for his newspaper. In a later interview with The Oregonian during the 1970s, McCall recalled her first meeting with him, telling the reporter "He was a very hungry reporter," who ate her food following the cooking demo, "That's how we became acquainted." The couple dated for three months before marrying on May 20, 1939, just one day after she accepted his marriage proposal. The small ceremony was held in Moscow with just two friends in attendance. The couple had two sons, Sam McCall and Thomas "Tad" McCall Jr., an environmental consultant.

McCall served as the First Lady of Oregon from 1967 until 1975 during the administration of her husband. Led by Governor McCall, a Republican, Oregon became known for its innovative environmental and social policies during their two terms in office. Audrey McCall supported many of these policies during her tenure as first lady and after leaving the governor's mansion. Separate from the Governor, First Lady McCall became an influential figure within Oregon politics in her own right. She was also considered one of her husband's closest political advisers behind-the-scenes, while projecting a more traditional public image as a homemaker and first lady.

Following former Governor McCall's death in 1983, Audrey McCall sought to preserve his political legacy. In particular, McCall used her influence and fundraising expertise to protect Oregon's landmark, statewide land-use laws, which Governor McCall had spearheaded and signed into law. During the early 2000s, Audrey McCall joined with other individuals in a lawsuit to stop Ballot Measure 7, a 2000 property-rights ballot measure that would have weakened the land-use laws introduced by Governor McCall in the 1970s. The courts eventually ruled in McCall's favor and the ballot initiative was defeated. She actively campaigned for and against several other ballot initiatives as well.

She also campaigned on behalf of a variety of other causes, and supported a bipartisan slate of candidates from both parties who supported these initiatives.

McCall also intervened during a dispute over the proposed location as a proposed memorial statue for Governor Tom McCall; both Portland and Salem, Oregon, wanted the statue to be placed in their cities. Audrey McCall agreed that the statue should be placed in Salem, the state capital, since that is where much of her husband's major initiatives were conceived. The statue now stands in Salem's Riverfront Park along the Willamette River.

Audrey McCall remained active and in good health until she broke her hip in a fall in mid-August 2007. Shortly after her fall, she moved to a nursing home facility in Southwest Portland, Oregon, where she died on November 15, 2007, at the age of 92. She was survived by one of her two sons, Tad McCall, her sister, Phyllis Royer, and two grandchildren. She was buried in Redmond, Oregon, next to her husband and son, Sam McCall, on November 24, 2007.

On October 13, 2017, the city of Portland and Mayor Ted Wheeler opened a new urban beach along the Willamette River in downtown Portland. The new beach was dedicated "Audrey McCall Beach" in the former first lady's honor. The Audrey McCall Beach, only the second urban beach to be acknowledged along the Willamette River, took four years to build. An estimated 19 tons of concrete was removed by Human Access Project in that time from the east side of the Portland waterfront to construct the new beach and access point to the river. The concrete removal was done without heavy mechanized equipment by Human Access Volunteers and collaboration with Multnomah County Inverness Jail Inmate workforce program

Human Access Project successfully advocated with Portland Mayor Charlie Hales to find $300,000 to study the feasibility of a beach at this site.

== See also ==
- First ladies and gentlemen of Oregon
