= Dan Little =

First Gentleman of Oregon from 2015 to 2023

First Gentleman of Oregon
- In role February 18, 2015 – January 9, 2023
- Governor: Kate Brown
- Preceded by: Cylvia Hayes (as first lady)
- Succeeded by: Aimee Kotek Wilson (as first lady)

Personal details
- Party: Democratic
- Spouse: Kate Brown (m. 1996)
- Children: 2
- Education: Colorado State University (BScF)

Dan Little is an American natural resources biologist who served as first gentleman of Oregon from 2015 to 2023 as the husband of Governor Kate Brown.

== Early life and education ==
Little was born in Boulder, Colorado. He graduated from Colorado State University in Fort Collins with a bachelor’s degree in forestry management (BScF). While in college, he met Kate Brown, who was studying environmental conservation at the University of Colorado.

== U.S. Forest Service (1982–2015) ==
Little worked for the U.S. Forest Service from 1982 until his retirement in 2015. Over the course of his career, he was involved in numerous national forest projects and specialized in developing databases and Geographic Information Systems (GIS) to inventory and analyze natural resource conditions.

== First gentleman of Oregon (2015–2023) ==
Little became first gentleman of Oregon on February 18, 2015, when his wife, Kate Brown, was sworn in as governor following the resignation of John Kitzhaber. He held the role throughout Brown’s tenure, which ended in January 2023.

== Personal life ==
Little married Kate Brown on October 11, 1996, at the old roller rink near the Wallowa Lake Tramway in northeastern Oregon. The couple resided in Enterprise until 1998, when Little moved to Portland. They currently live in Salem, Oregon. Little has two adult children, Jessie and Dylan, from a previous relationship.

Honorary titles
Preceded by Cylvia Hayes as First Lady	First Gentleman of Oregon; February 18, 2015 – January 9, 2023	Succeeded by Aimee Kotek Wilson as First Lady
