= We Can Do Better =

Healthcare organization

We Can Do Better (formerly known as the Archimedes Movement; founded 2006) is a grassroots movement based in the U.S. state of Oregon, which aims to bring citizens and stakeholders together to design a health care system that "works better for everyone." It was founded by former Oregon governor John Kitzhaber, a physician, in January 2006. Kitzhaber's goal was to find a way to put money used for health care, which as of 2006 amounted to about $6.3 billion in Oregon, to better use. That year, it was one of three organizations that drew substantially increased funding levels from the Northwest Health Foundation; its grant funds totaled $82,000.

In 2007, members of the organization initially "crowded the steps" of the Oregon Capitol in support of a bill before the 2007 legislature to establish the Oregon Health Trust, but Kitzhaber later reversed his position, pulling his support from the bill and advising members of the organization that the then-current version of the bill did "not reflect the work ... done by you through the Archimedes Movement."

The organization's goal was to create a national grassroots effort to reform health care, starting in Oregon. It was founded on the belief that incremental change to existing health programs like Medicare and Medicaid will not be sufficient to solve their long-term problems, and that communities and coalitions outside the political world would need to form consensus around goals and values, and pressure lawmakers to make more fundamental changes.

The organization's executive director, Liz Baxter, has advocated for health policy reform to members of the Oregon Legislative Assembly. She also chairs the Oregon Health Insurance Exchange Board, established in 2011.

The Archimedes Movement is a member of the Oregon Health Reform Collaborative. The organization's original name was based on the ancient Greek mathematician Archimedes, who is quoted as saying "Give me a lever and a place to stand, and I can move the Earth."
