= Mary Wendy Roberts =

American politician

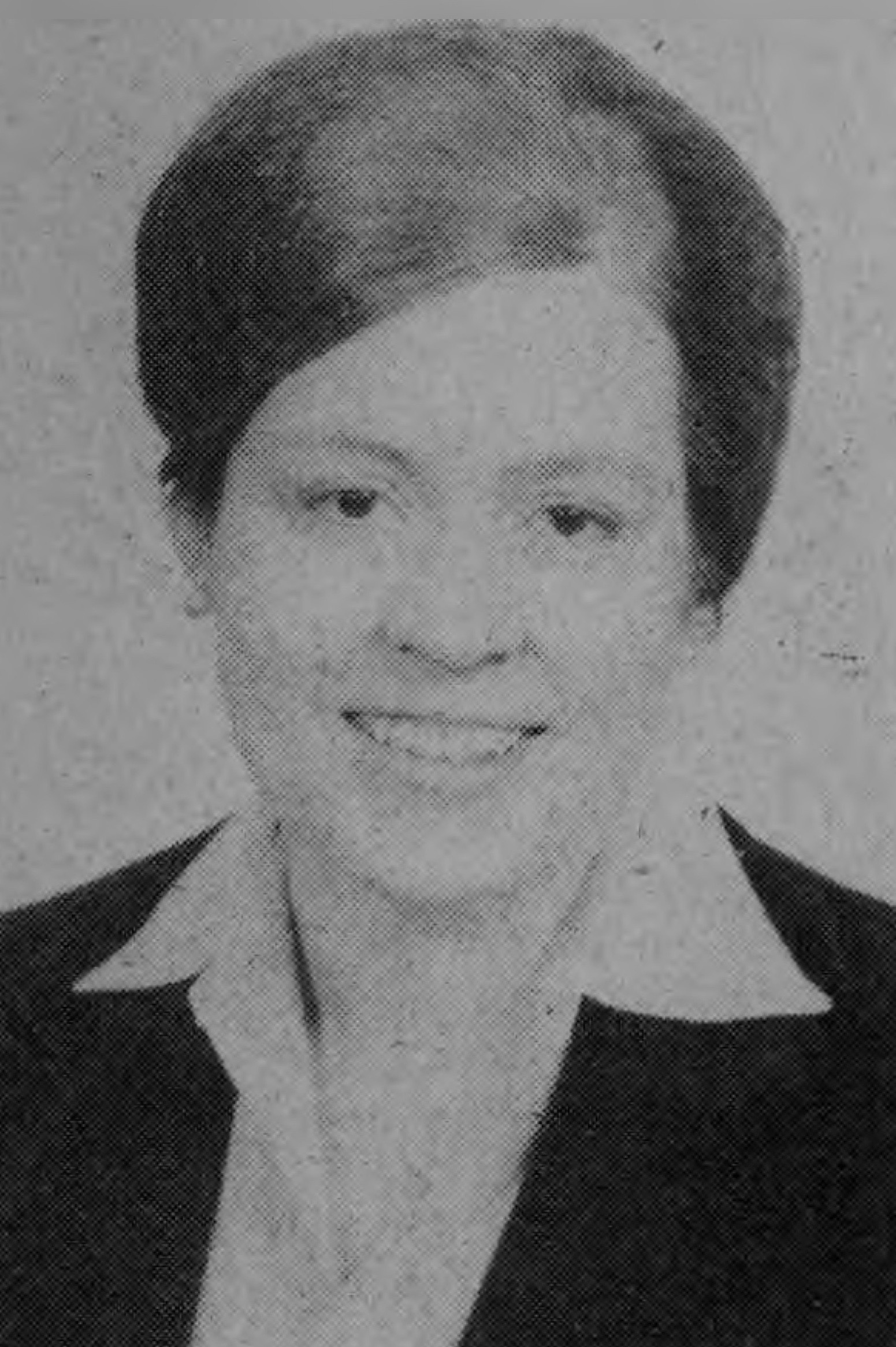

6th Oregon Commissioner of Labor
- In office January 1, 1979 – January 2, 1995
- Governor: Victor Atiyeh; Neil Goldschmidt; Barbara Roberts
- Preceded by: Bill Stevenson
- Succeeded by: Jack Roberts

Member of the Oregon State Senate
- In office 1975–1979

Member of the Oregon House of Representatives
- In office 1973–1975

Personal details
- Born: December 19, 1944 (age 81)
- Party: Democratic
- Education: University of Oregon (BA); University of Wisconsin–Madison (MA)

Mary Wendy Roberts (born December 19, 1944) is an American politician from the U.S. state of Oregon. At 27, Roberts was the youngest woman ever elected to the Oregon Legislative Assembly. She was elected to the Oregon State Senate in 1974. In 1978, at 33, she became the first woman Democrat to win Oregon statewide office, serving for 16 years as Oregon Commissioner of Labor, the chief executive of the state agency that enforces the state civil rights and wage-hour laws, and oversees apprenticeship programs.

== Early life and education ==
The first child of Oregon politician Frank L. Roberts and his first wife Mary Louise, Roberts attended Portland public schools and graduated from West Linn High School in Clackamas County in 1962. She attended the University of Oregon as an Honors College student, earning a Bachelor of Arts degree in political science in December 1965. She then studied at the Chinese-Japanese Language Institute of the University of Colorado Boulder as a fellow. She received her Master of Arts degree in political science from the University of Wisconsin–Madison.

== Career ==
Roberts began her career as a caseworker with the State Public Welfare Department in Portland and then as a counselor for the Multnomah County juvenile court.

Roberts was elected in 1972 to the Oregon House of Representatives and served as a member of the Joint Ways and Means Committee. She was elected to the Oregon State Senate in 1974. While serving in the Oregon State Senate, Roberts was one of only three women.

=== Oregon Commissioner of Labor ===
Roberts was elected Oregon Commissioner of Labor in 1978 and re-elected in 1982, 1986 and 1990. She wrote the law in 1985 creating the first Wage Security Fund in the United States. It guaranteed workers up to $4,000 of owed wages left jobless by business closures. She sponsored the Oregon Family Medical Leave Act, which guaranteed up to 12 weeks job-protected leave to workers—to allow time off for illness, injury or death of a family member. In 1989, she fought for passage of parental leave, enforced by the Oregon Bureau of Labor and Industries. Roberts' final orders on parental leave cases were upheld by the Oregon Supreme Court on appeal, firmly established case law. Roberts testified on the act in the United States Congress—and the federal act was patterned in part on the state law. When President George H. W. Bush twice vetoed the national bill, Roberts was often quoted in The New York Times, which also published her op-ed column on the subject. Roberts was in the advisory committee to the United States Department of Labor for shaping the national act and it was the first one signed by President Bill Clinton when he took office in 1993.

Roberts was an early champion of civil rights protections, on the basis of sexual orientation, winning state awards for leadership. She worked against abuses of migrant labor, getting legislation passed to address needs for better inspection of farm labor camps, civil rights protections, and more housing. Other awards came from Hispanic, human resources and women's rights groups.

Roberts was a member of international delegations: the United States Department of Labor delegation to the International Conference on Innovations in Apprenticeship in Paris, the United States delegation to China, 1980 and 2000, sponsored by the American Council of Young Political Leaders, at the behest of the United States State Department—and a school-to-work apprenticeship program in Germany, which she created, in partnership with the state of Upper Saxony. She was a speaker at President Jimmy Carter's re-election kickoff dinner and at the 1980 Democratic National Convention. Roberts was president of the National Association of Government Labor Officials and of the National Apprenticeship Program Board. She was profiled in the 1983 book Images of Oregon Women, by Ellen Nichols. Roberts ran for Oregon Secretary of State in 1992, losing to incumbent Democrat Phil Keisling.

Two years later, in 1994, Roberts was defeated for re-election by Jack Roberts (no relation).

=== Later career ===
After elective office, Roberts managed real estate investments, operated a health and personal development business with her husband, and worked as a consultant to law firms on wage/hour and civil rights law. Roberts helped found and served on the Board of Directors of Green Village Schools, a nonprofit that built and funded primary schools (for boys and girls) in Helmand Province, Afghanistan. She has given speeches to help raise money for breast cancer exams for low-income women.

== Personal life ==
Roberts married Richard Prentice Bullock in November 1976, had one child, Alexandra, born in 1980, while she was in office as Oregon Commissioner of Labor, but divorced her first husband in 1984. She married Edward E. "Rhett" Simpson in December 1994. She battled breast cancer in 2002.

=== Family ===
- Frank Livezey Roberts (1915–1993) Oregon House 1967–71. Oregon Senate, 1975–93. Married three times. Married 2) Betty Roberts, 3) Barbara Roberts.
- Betty Roberts (1923–2011) Oregon House, 1965–69. Oregon Senate, 1969–77. Judge, Oregon Court of Appeals, 1977–82. Associate Justice, Oregon Supreme Court, 1982–86. Democratic candidate for Governor of Oregon, 1974. Democratic candidate for United States Senate, 1974
- Keith Skelton (1918–1995) Oregon House, 1957–73. Husband (#3) of Betty Roberts, 1968 until his death.
- Barbara Roberts (born 1936) Oregon House, 1981–85. Oregon Secretary of State, 1985–91. 34th Governor of Oregon, 1991–95. Married to Frank Roberts, 1974 until his death.
- Mary Wendy Roberts (born 1944) Oregon House, 1973–75. Oregon Senate, 1975–79. Oregon Commissioner of Labor, 1979–95. Candidate for Oregon Secretary of State 1992. First daughter of Frank Roberts and Mary Louise Roberts.
- Richard Bullock (born 1951) Oregon Senate, 1979–82. Husband of Mary Wendy Roberts, 1976–84.
- Leslie Roberts (born 1947) Second daughter of Frank Roberts and Mary Louise Roberts. Multnomah County circuit court judge, 2007 to present.
- Rex Armstrong Oregon Court of Appeals Judge, 1995–present, in seat first held by Betty Roberts. Married Leslie Roberts in 1984.
