= Cylvia Hayes =

First Lady of Oregon from 2011 to 2015

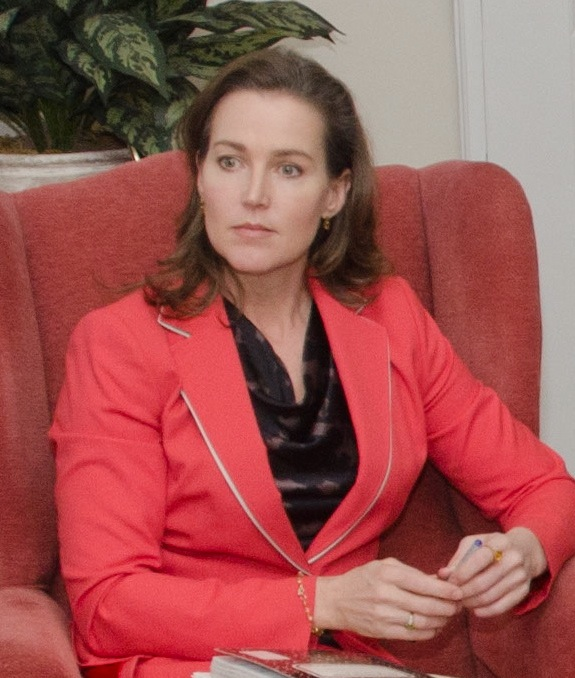
- Hayes in 2012

First Lady of Oregon
- In role January 10, 2011 – February 18, 2015
- Governor: John Kitzhaber
- Preceded by: Mary Oberst
- Succeeded by: Dan Little (as First Gentleman)

Personal details
- Born: Cylvia Lynne Johnson; August 10, 1967 (age 59) Seattle, Washington, U.S.
- Party: Democratic
- Spouse(s): Todd Hayes (m. 1984; div. 1986) Doug McCarthy (m. 1994; div. 1996) Abraham B. Abraham (m. 1997; div. 2002)
- Domestic partner: John Kitzhaber (2003–present)
- Education: The Evergreen State College (B.S., M.E.S.)
- Occupation: CEO of 3EStrategies; Consultant

Cylvia Lynne Hayes (née Johnson, born August 10, 1967) is an American consultant who served as first lady of Oregon from 2011 to 2015 as the fiancée of Governor John Kitzhaber. (Note: Sources:) A member of the Democratic Party, she was also an unsuccessful candidate for District 53 in the 2002 Oregon House of Representatives election, running against incumbent State Representative Ben Westlund.

In 2014, media outlets including Willamette Week and The Oregonian reported on potential conflict of interest between Hayes’ consulting work and her role as the governor's partner. The Oregonian subsequently sought access to Hayes’ personal emails related to state business. In October 2015, Hayes wrote on her blog that she had provided “every email” requested by federal investigators and accused the newspaper of misrepresentation. Shortly before resigning in February 2015, Kitzhaber announced that Hayes would no longer have any political or policy role during his fourth term.

== Early life and education ==
Hayes was born in August 1967 in Seattle. Her father, Orville Johnson, was the brother of her mother's first husband. The family lived near Carnation in King County, Washington, and Hayes has described the home as a dilapidated shack with no running water or electricity. At sixteen, Hayes moved out, stating, "alcoholism and mental illness took a real toll on my parents." As a teenager and young adult, Hayes worked a variety of jobs including apple picking, catching fryer chickens, training horses, heavy equipment operation, dental assistant, plastic surgery assistant, and working for the King County public works department.

She graduated from Evergreen State College in Olympia, Washington, with a bachelor's degree in 1994, and with a master's degree in 1997.

Hayes' late teens and early twenties have been described as a difficult period in her life. In 1997, Hayes entered into a green card marriage with an Ethiopian immigrant that ended in 2002. In a statement in October 2014, Hayes admitted the "serious mistake" of this previously undisclosed arrangement. Hayes married for $5,000.

While in a relationship from 1997 to 1998, Hayes and her then boyfriend placed a down payment on a property in Okanogan, Washington. In a statement in 2014 covered by Portland television station KOIN 6 News, Hayes said that the couple planned to use the property for a marijuana grow operation that never materialized. Hayes left the relationship in April 1998 and moved to central Oregon in July of that year.

== Professional career ==
Hayes moved to Bend, Oregon, from Washington in summer 1998 and began a career in clean energy and sustainable economic development. That year Hayes founded 3EStrategies, a Bend-based clean-economy consulting firm that grew out of the nonprofit organization she launched two years before, called Earth Connections. As CEO of 3EStrategies, Hayes helped launched the Building Green Council, which is now a component of the Central Oregon Builders Association. The council was started to make it easier for people to build energy- and resource-efficient homes and commercial buildings, and bring together developers interested in promoting and learning more about green construction. Hayes published and edited the Green + Solar Building Oregon magazine from 2004 to 2009, created with contributions from writers and photographers throughout the state. She served as a member and co-chair of the Oregon Renewable Energy Working Group (REWG), which developed the state Renewable Energy Standard, Renewable Fuels Standard, and other clean energy policies. Since 2012, Hayes has also worked as a professional writer, contributing to online news sources including The Huffington Post and Grist. In 2015 Hayes launched an independent blog which included a public statement about her appearances in the media that year, and in 2016 she joined Bend-based Issue Magazine as a staff journalist.

== Political career ==
Four years after she moved to Bend, Oregon, Hayes ran for the Oregon House of Representatives in District 53 against Ben Westlund, the Republican incumbent, as a Democrat. She launched her campaign to win the Democratic nomination as a write-in candidate after what she described as a "filing deadline error" kept her from being listed on the ballot. She changed her party registration from independent to Democratic in February 2002, shortly before announcing her candidacy, and she originally considered seeking a nomination from a minor party, such as the Pacific Green Party. Hayes lost to Westlund in the November election, with 30.5% of the vote. Hayes met then-outgoing Governor John Kitzhaber during the campaign.

== First Lady of Oregon (2011–2015) ==
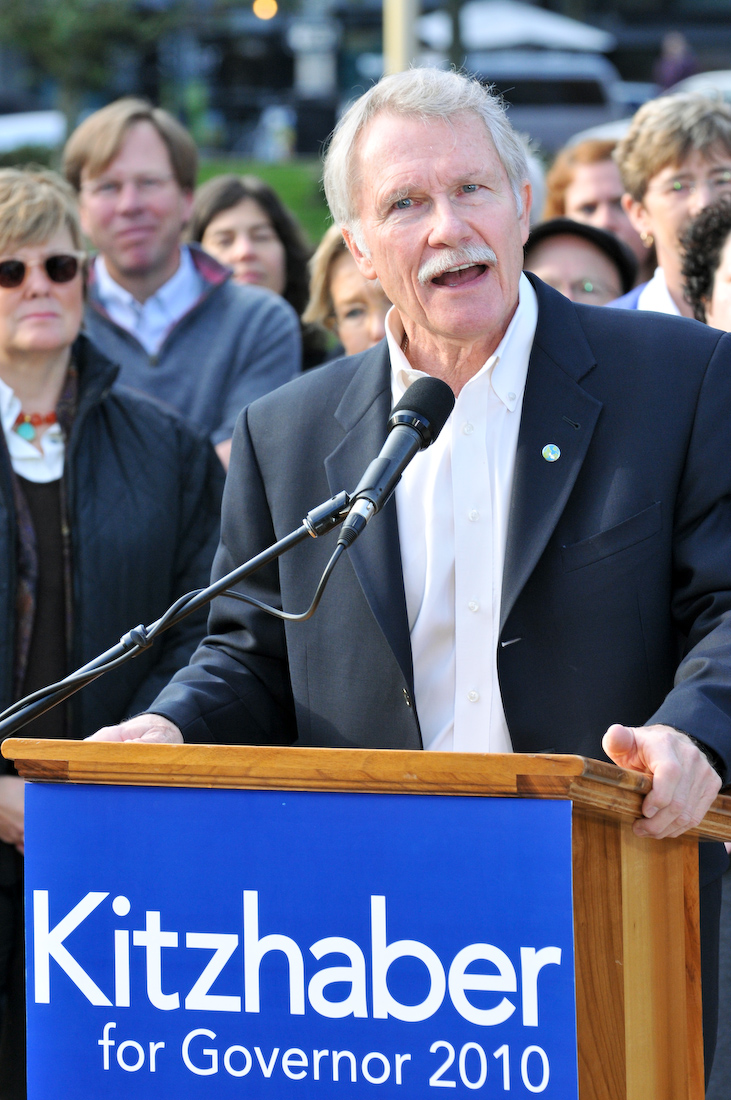
John Kitzhaber in 2010

Hayes campaigned alongside Kitzhaber when he ran again for governor in 2010. After Kitzhaber was elected and sworn in, Hayes assumed many of the roles and responsibilities of First Lady. Willamette Week described her in 2014 as playing a "central role" in the Kitzhaber administration, and she was described as a policy adviser to the governor on clean energy and economic development issues, fields where she had nonprofit and consulting experience prior to becoming first lady.

During her time as first lady, Hayes worked on the Prosperity Initiative that aimed to reduce income inequality in Oregon. In the 2011 legislative session, she supported the centerpiece of Kitzhaber's economic agenda, Cool Schools energy retrofit program, and also lobbied the Legislature on poverty issues. In the same year, Hayes was named to a seven-member team charged with writing Kitzhaber's ten-year energy plan, touted by the administration as a path toward Oregon's energy independence. Hayes frequently delivered speeches on clean economy during her time as First Lady, such as the 2013 commencement address to Oregon State University. According to Willamette Week she did not draw a state salary and like the partners of other elected officials continued her private consulting work during her time in the governor's office.

Kitzhaber announced on January 30, 2015, that Hayes would not play a role in his administration during his fourth term. Hayes' "First Lady" website was taken down four days later. On February 13, 2015, Kitzhaber announced his intention to resign as governor effective February 18, 2015.

== Influence-peddling scandal ==
In 2014, Hayes was the subject of a series of articles and media coverage that weakened Kitzhaber's reelection campaign and the governor's office. On October 8, a month before the gubernatorial election in 2014, Willamette Week reported on Hayes's previously undisclosed "green card marriage" from 1997 to 2002. A few days later, Portland television station KOIN reported on Hayes' role over a decade prior in purchasing property for a planned grow operation in Washington, also in 1997. In a statement to the news station on October 13, Hayes admitted to and apologized for her role in the planned operation. According to Hayes, she went along with the property purchase while in a relationship with an abusive boyfriend, whom she left soon after.

Hayes and Kitzhaber also faced questions over her alleged use of her position as first lady and relationship to the governor to boost the profile of her consulting business. In October 2014, Willamette Week raised questions about the potential conflict of interest regarding Hayes' role as First Lady and her consulting work for 3EStrategies. In November the Oregon Government Ethics Commission rejected a request made by Kitzhaber to look into her records. On January 27, 2015, the Portland Tribune reported Hayes was paid $118,000 for communications work with the Clean Economy Development Center at the same time she was listed as an adviser to Kitzhaber on renewable energy. The newspaper suggested the dual roles could be considered a conflict of interest. The Oregonian raised similar questions in a report a few days later.

In December 2014, The Oregonian requested emails from Hayes' personal email accounts related to state business. When Hayes responded that she held no formal government position and had no government authority, The Oregonian petitioned Attorney General Ellen Rosenblum on January 29, 2015, for the release of the emails. In an article on February 4, 2015, Willamette Week (whose publisher and co-owner Richard Meeker is married to Rosenblum, which the paper acknowledged) commented on the lack of investigation and Rosenblum's self-proclaimed reluctance to comment on the case. A week later, on February 12, 2015, Rosenblum concluded that Hayes had earned public-official status and ordered the release of emails to The Oregonian.

On February 25, 2015, Hayes filed a lawsuit against The Oregonian, claiming Fifth Amendment rights against the release of the emails and citing Rosenblum's order that Hayes had asked for a state email but was ineligible without employee status. On April 3, 2015, under federal subpoena, Governor Kate Brown's office publicly released 94,000 emails between Hayes and official email accounts of staff members in Kitzhaber's office.

In 2017, after 28 months of investigation, the federal government announced that it had dropped its investigation into allegations that Cylvia Hayes and her fiancé, Governor John Kitzhaber, had used their positions for personal gain. No criminal charges were filed.

On January 18, 2019, Hayes agreed to pay Oregon Government Ethics Commission fines of "$44,000 for ethics violations arising from her use of public office for personal profit." Kitzhaber had also agreed, in January, to pay $20,000 in civil penalties to the commission for conflicts of interest regarding Hayes while he was governor.

== Personal life ==
Hayes' current surname is from her two-year marriage to her first husband Todd Hayes. Hayes has been married three times. Her first was to Todd Hayes from 1984 to 1986; her second was to Doug McCarthy, which ended in 1996; and her third was to Abraham B. Abraham using the name Cynthia Lynne Hayes on the marriage certificate. Hayes filed a divorce from Abram in October 2001.

Hayes participates in running, weight training, and racquetball, and was a 2006 state champion racquetball player.

Hayes is currently engaged to Oregon former governor John Kitzhaber, who is 20 years her senior and with whom she became romantically involved after her 2002 House campaign. When Kitzhaber was elected governor of Oregon in 2010, Hayes, as his live-in girlfriend, assumed the role of the state's first lady. The couple announced their engagement in August 2014. Hayes owns a home in Bend, Oregon, while also sharing Kitzhaber's home in Portland.

== Notes ==
Honorary titles
Preceded by Mary Oberst	First Lady of Oregon; January 10, 2011 – February 18, 2015	Succeeded by Dan Little as First Gentleman
