= Oregon Government Ethics Commission =

Government body

Agency overview
- Formed: 1974
- Jurisdiction: Oregon
- Headquarters: Salem, Oregon
- Agency executive: Susan V. Myers, Executive Director
- Website: Official website

The Oregon Government Ethics Commission, formerly known as the Oregon Government Standards and Practices Commission, is a nine-member government body in the U.S. state of Oregon responsible for enforcing the state's government ethics, lobbying, and public meetings laws. The commission reviews possible violations and is empowered to make legal determinations and issue advisory opinions.

Eight members of the commission are appointed by the governor of Oregon upon recommendation of the Democratic and Republican leadership in both chambers of the Oregon Legislature, while one member is appointed directly by the governor at his or her discretion. All nine members are confirmed through a vote in the Senate. The commissioners, in turn, appoint an executive director to administer the commission and appoint a limited staff.

The commission was established in 1974 by a statewide referendum. Its purview is set by state statute. Its name was changed from Oregon Government Standards and Practices Commission to Oregon Government Ethics Commission in July 2007, by the Oregon Legislature.

== Notable cases ==
- The commission leveled 1,433 ethics charges at Superintendent Stan Bunn in 2002, most of them for misuse of state telephones for personal use. After losing reelection that year, Bunn settled a lawsuit in Marion County court related to the ethics charges for $25,000.
- The commission began an investigation into whether First Lady Cylvia Hayes improperly used her office for personal gain while working both as a private consultant and an adviser to her fiancé, Governor John Kitzhaber, in 2014. The commission put its investigation on hold in February 2015 after Attorney General Ellen Rosenblum announced a criminal probe into Hayes's and Kitzhaber's activities.

== See also ==
- Ethics commission
