= John Kitzhaber =

35th & 37th governor of Oregon (born 1947)

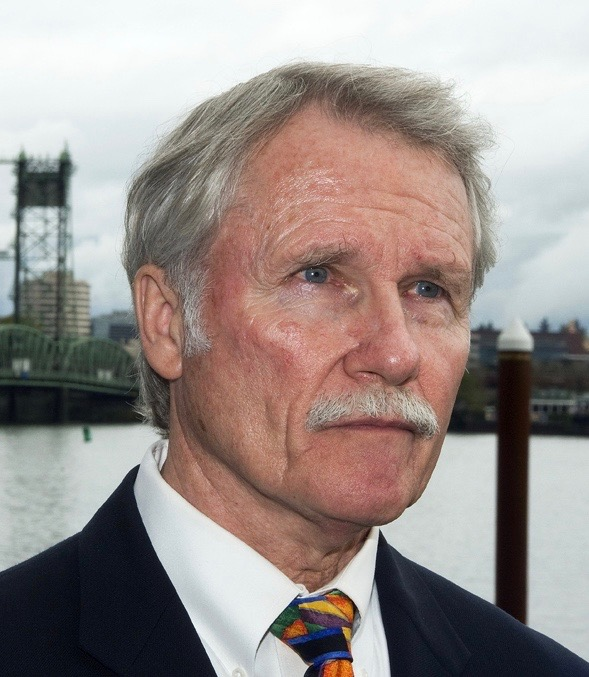
- Kitzhaber in 2011

35th and 37th Governor of Oregon
- In office January 10, 2011 – February 18, 2015
- Preceded by: Ted Kulongoski
- Succeeded by: Kate Brown
- In office January 9, 1995 – January 13, 2003
- Preceded by: Barbara Roberts
- Succeeded by: Ted Kulongoski

President of the Oregon Senate
- In office January 3, 1985 – January 3, 1993
- Preceded by: Edward Fadeley
- Succeeded by: Bill Bradbury

Member of the Oregon Senate from the 23rd district
- In office January 12, 1981 – January 3, 1993
- Preceded by: Jason Boe
- Succeeded by: Rod Johnson

Member of the Oregon House of Representatives from the 45th district
- In office January 8, 1979 – January 12, 1981
- Preceded by: Al Shaw
- Succeeded by: Verner Anderson

Personal details
- Born: John Albert Kitzhaber; March 5, 1947 (age 79) Colfax, Washington, U.S.
- Party: Democratic
- Spouses: Rosemary Linehan (m. 1971; div. 1974); Sharon LaCroix (m. 1995; div. 2003)
- Domestic partner: Cylvia Hayes (2003–present)
- Education: Dartmouth College (BA); Oregon Health and Science University (MD)

John Albert Kitzhaber (born March 5, 1947) is an American former politician and physician who served as the 35th and 37th governor of Oregon from 1995 to 2003 and again from 2011 to 2015. In February 2015, shortly after beginning his fourth term, Kitzhaber resigned from office and was replaced by Secretary of State Kate Brown. A member of the Democratic Party, Kitzhaber was the longest-serving governor in the state's history.

A physician in Roseburg, Kitzhaber was elected to the Oregon House of Representatives in 1978. After one term, he won an Oregon Senate seat in 1980, serving three terms, until 1993. He was Senate President from 1985 to 1993. In 1994, he was elected governor of Oregon, defeating his Republican opponent Denny Smith. He was reelected by a wide margin in 1998, making him the first Democrat to be reelected as Governor since 1906, and left office in January 2003. In 2010, Kitzhaber ran for governor again and narrowly defeated his Republican opponent Chris Dudley. He was reelected in 2014, to become Oregon's longest serving governor.

Kitzhaber resigned from office only a month into his fourth term on February 18, 2015, as state and federal authorities were investigating criminal allegations against him and his fiancée Cylvia Hayes. In 2017, the federal government dropped its investigation against Kitzhaber without filing charges. The Oregon ethics commission found 10 instances when Kitzhaber used his political office for personal gain. He agreed to pay a settlement fine of $20,000.

== Early life and career ==
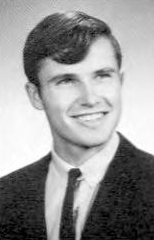
Kitzhaber in the Dartmouth College yearbook, 1969

Kitzhaber was born on March 5, 1947, in Colfax, Washington, to Annabel Reed (née Wetzel) and Albert Raymond Kitzhaber. He graduated from South Eugene High School in 1965, Dartmouth College in 1969, and Oregon Health & Science University with a medical degree in 1973. Kitzhaber practiced medicine from 1973 to 1986 in Roseburg, Oregon, as an emergency physician.

== Legislative career ==
Kitzhaber began his political career in 1978 when he won election to the Oregon House of Representatives, where he served for one term. In 1980, he was elected to the Oregon State Senate, where he served three terms from 1981 to 1993 and was the president of the Senate from 1985 to 1993. As Oregon Senate President, he was the chief author of the state's government-funded health care plan, the Oregon Health Plan.

== Governorship ==
=== First term, 1995–1999 ===
In 1994, Kitzhaber won the Democratic nomination for governor when the sitting governor, Barbara Roberts (also a Democrat), withdrew from the race in January of that year. Roberts opted against a second term after voters refused to pass a sales tax to fund the Oregon Health Plan and she was forced to break her campaign promise not to cut spending.

Kitzhaber won the general election in November 1994 with 51% of the vote. The Republican candidate, former Rep. Denny Smith, won 42%. He was sworn into office on January 9, 1995.

During his first term, Kitzhaber introduced the Oregon Children's Plan, which was designed to identify and assist at-risk children and their families. Despite being personally opposed to the death penalty, Kitzhaber allowed two executions to be carried out in his first term: Douglas Franklin Wright in 1996 and Harry Charles Moore in 1997. In a statement in 2011, Kitzhaber said "They were the most agonizing and difficult decisions I have made as Governor... I have regretted those choices ever since."

=== Second term, 1999–2003 ===
Republican anti-tax activist Bill Sizemore challenged Kitzhaber in 1998. Sizemore had founded Oregon Taxpayers United, a political action committee that lobbied against tax increases and promoted ballot measures limiting the use of union dues in political campaigns, in 1993.

During the general election, The Oregonian newspaper reported Sizemore's controversial business practices in his personal life, as well as in the operation of his political action committees and non-profit educational foundation.

Kitzhaber won 64% of the vote to 30% for Sizemore. Kitzhaber won 35 of 36 counties in Oregon, with only rural Malheur County on the Idaho border going for Sizemore

In his second term, Kitzhaber developed policy initiatives related to natural resources during his two terms as governor, including The Oregon Plan for Salmon and Watersheds aimed at restoring dwindling runs of threatened salmon species to Oregon's rivers and streams. The plan was a collaborative effort that encouraged federal, state and local government agencies to work with private landowners to restore watershed health and recover threatened salmon runs. Kitzhaber also took a high profile and controversial stand in favor of breaching several Northwest dams to help restore salmon populations.

Managing growth, particularly in the Willamette Valley, was a priority of Kitzhaber and he was a staunch supporter of Oregon's comprehensive land use system. He opposed attempts to weaken protection of farmland and enforcement of urban growth boundaries. Kitzhaber also created the Governor's Growth Task Force and the Willamette Valley Livability Forum to help gather accurate information and outline integrated approaches for developing sustainable communities. His related Community Solutions program attempted to focus the efforts of numerous state agencies, other governments and interested groups in collaborative problem solving and coordination to manage various community development projects across Oregon.

Under Oregon's constitution, Kitzhaber could not seek a third consecutive term in 2002. He was succeeded by Democrat Ted Kulongoski, who was elected governor in 2002 and 2006.

=== Interregnum, 2003-2011 ===
After his first tenure as governor, Kitzhaber became the director of the Center for Evidence Based Policy at the Oregon Health & Science University, served as the executive chair and president at both the Foundation for Medical Excellence and the Estes Park Institute, and founded the health care advocacy group the Archimedes Movement.

=== Third term, 2011–2015 ===
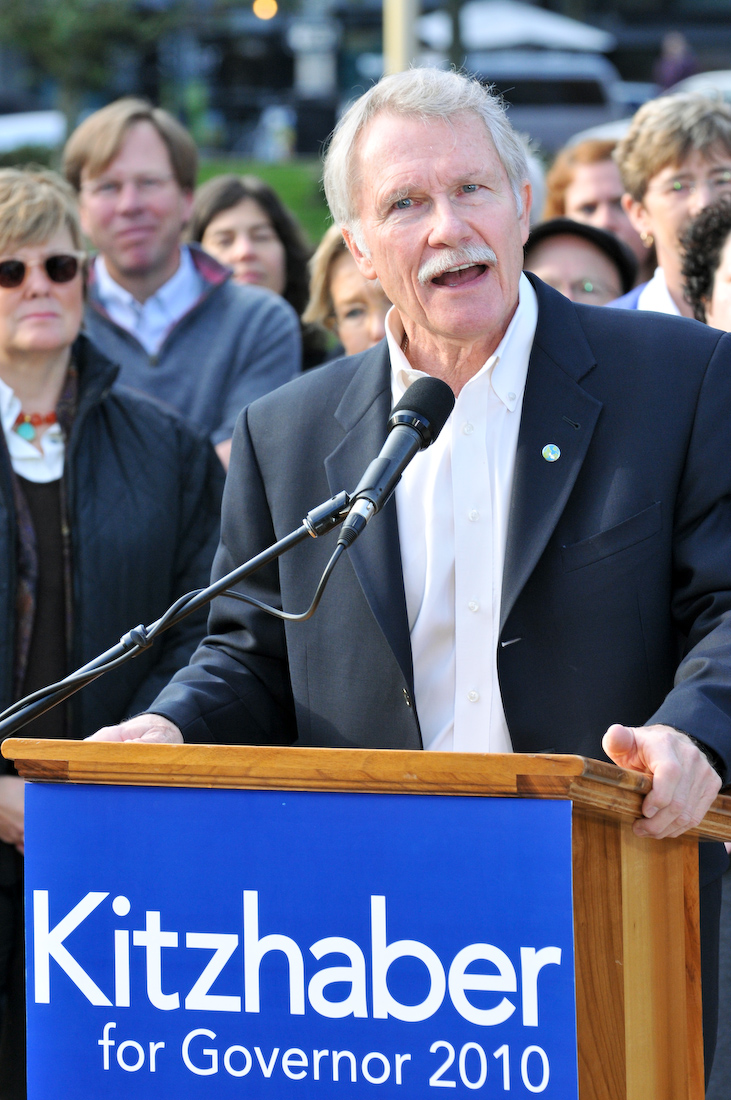
Kitzhaber after winning the 2010 election

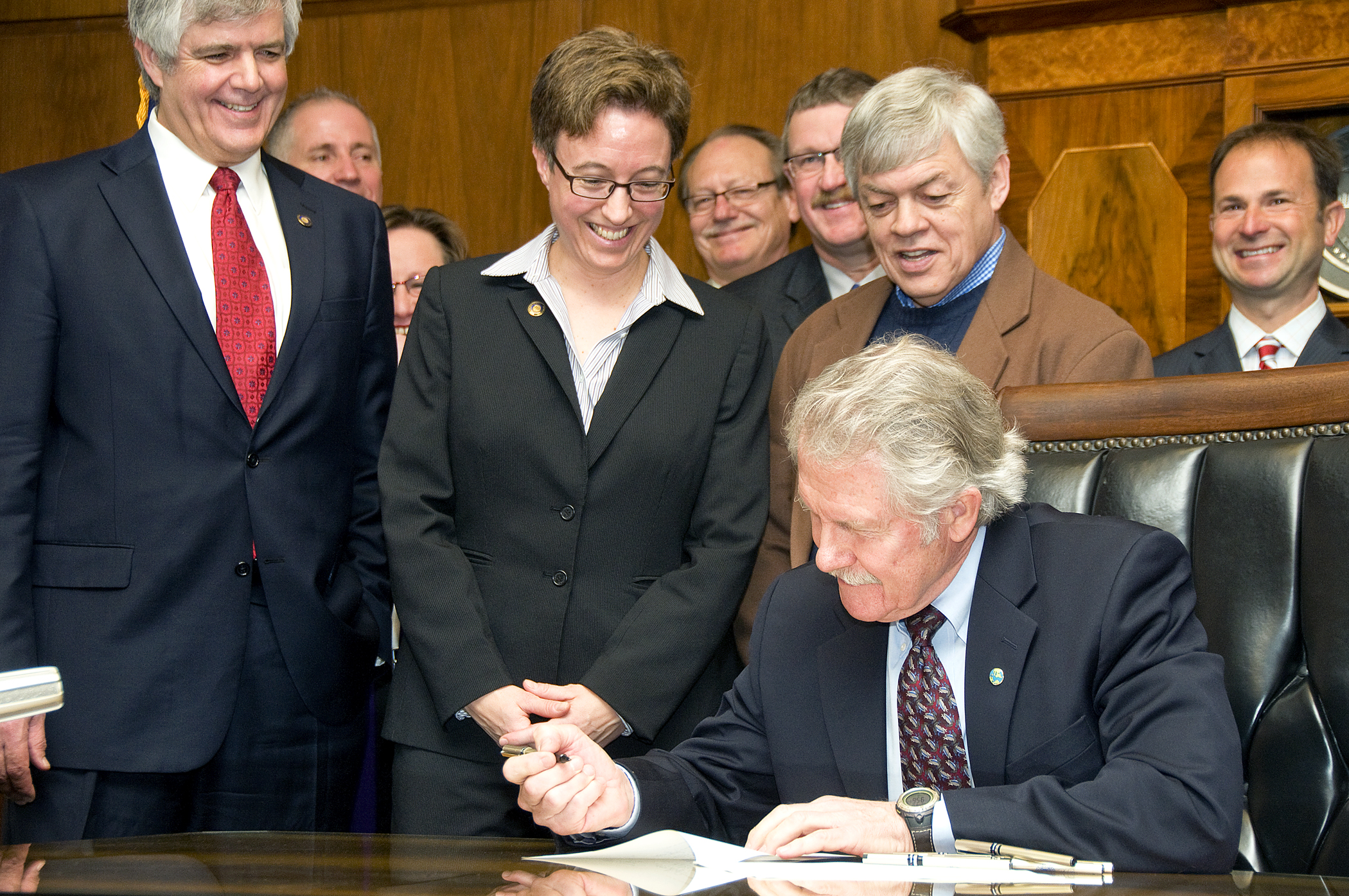
Kitzhaber at a bill signing in 2013

In September 2009, Kitzhaber announced that he would run for a third term as governor. He won the Democratic primary in May 2010, defeating Roger Obrist and the former Secretary of State of Oregon Bill Bradbury.

In the general election, he ran against Republican Chris Dudley, a businessman and former NBA player. Kitzhaber won a close election, 49.29% to 47.77%, with minor party candidates receiving the additional fractions.

Kitzhaber was sworn into his third term as governor of Oregon on January 10, 2011, succeeding the Democrat who had succeeded him, Governor Ted Kulongoski.

The 2010 election was the first time Oregon used its new cross nomination system, a form of fusion voting. In this system, a candidate for partisan public office can be nominated by up to three political parties. Kitzhaber was nominated by the Independent Party of Oregon in addition to the Democratic Party.

On November 22, 2011, Kitzhaber announced that he might commute an upcoming death sentence scheduled to occur in the month ahead. Kitzhaber went on to announce that he would allow no executions to occur in Oregon while he was governor, calling the issuing of death sentences "compromised and inequitable". The reprieved inmate, Gary Haugen, made headlines when he refused to be pardoned, wanting to be executed. Senior Judge Timothy P. Alexander, assigned to Marion County Circuit Court, ruled that Haugen could reject the governor's reprieve of his execution and move forward in his efforts to die by lethal injection. Kitzhaber appealed the decision to the Oregon Supreme Court, which decided in the governor's favor on June 20, 2013. In 2012, Rolling Stone magazine named Kitzhaber one of "The Quiet Ones: 12 Leaders Who Get Things Done", citing his decision to halt all executions in Oregon as "demonstrating just how effective government can be".

Kitzhaber presided over the failed launch of Cover Oregon, the state's Affordable Care Act insurance exchange website. He was also disappointed in 2014 by the collapse of the Columbia River Crossing infrastructure megaproject, amid opposition from some urbanists in Portland and by Republicans in Washington's state Senate and Clark County government.

A more personal scandal struck the governor's office late in 2014 when the Willamette Week exposed a previously unknown marriage between First Lady Cylvia Hayes and an Ethiopian immigrant in 1997. Hayes admitted to the union, which was dissolved in the early 2000s, and said it was an illegal green card marriage into which she entered for money during a difficult period in her life. Kitzhaber was reportedly unaware of the marriage until the Willamette Week's investigation. Just days later, local news stations reported that Hayes was involved in another criminal scheme in 1997 involving a marijuana grow operation in Washington, to which Hayes also admitted.

At the same time, Kitzhaber faced questions over Hayes' consulting business and whether the first lady improperly used her position and relationship to the governor. Kitzhaber asked for an ethics review into Hayes's business activities, which the state commission declined to look into. Kitzhaber publicly defended Hayes against criticism, saying the state executive branch followed protocol with regard to her consulting work and calling her past marriage a "personal issue", although he admitted at a debate that he was "taken aback and hurt" to learn of it.

=== Fourth term, 2015 ===
Kitzhaber ran for reelection in 2014. While he consistently led opponent Dennis Richardson, a conservative Republican state representative from Central Point, in public polling and defeated him by a margin of 5.6 percent, his campaign faced controversy over the failure of Cover Oregon and the activities of Kitzhaber's fiancée, Cylvia Hayes, with Richardson charging that the Governor and the First Lady were corrupt. Kitzhaber was cross-nominated by the Working Families Party of Oregon.

Kitzhaber was sworn in for a historic fourth term as governor on January 12, 2015. At the start of his fourth term, he enjoyed the largest Democratic majorities in the Oregon Legislative Assembly he had seen in more than 12 years as governor. In his inaugural address, Kitzhaber indicated his fourth gubernatorial term would be the last one he would seek, saying it "will complete the arc of my political career". He said he wanted to focus on socioeconomic inequality in Oregon during his last four years as governor of the state.

== Hayes influence peddling scandal and aftermath ==
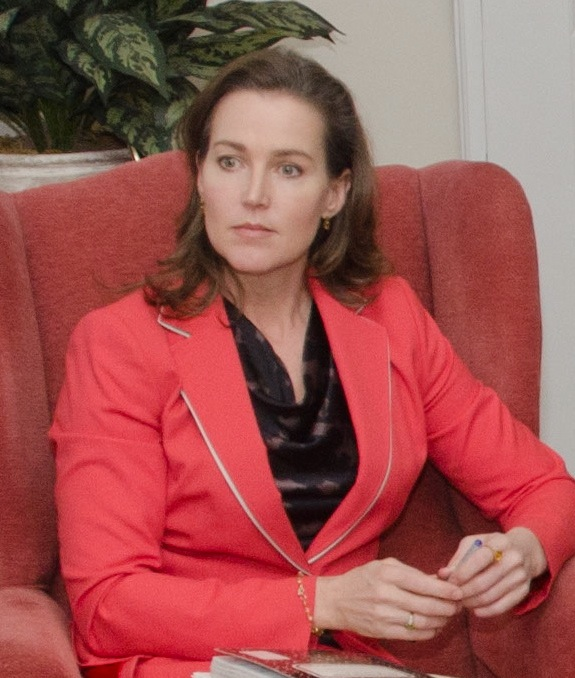
First Lady Cylvia Hayes

Despite his efforts to pivot toward policy, Kitzhaber continued to grapple with controversies related to his fiancée and her work as a consultant and for the state. At a press conference on January 30, 2015, he said Hayes would play no further role in his administration, although he confirmed the couple still plans to marry. The Oregonian, which endorsed him in his 2010 and 2014 campaigns, went so far as to call on him to resign, although Kitzhaber said he would not consider doing so. Major Democratic officeholders in the state, including Treasurer Ted Wheeler, Senate President Peter Courtney, and House Speaker Tina Kotek, all issued statements on February 12 urging Kitzhaber to resign. Also on February 12, the Willamette Week reported that Kitzhaber's executive assistant had tried to have thousands of the governor's emails deleted the previous week. The next day, February 13, Kitzhaber announced his resignation (effective February 18, 2015) amid the scandal.

In 2017, following 28 months of investigation, the federal government announced that it had dropped its investigation into allegations that Kitzhaber and his partner Cylvia Hayes had used their positions for personal gain. In a statement posted on his Facebook page, Kitzhaber said:

There was nothing to pursue. As I have said from the beginning, I did not resign because I was guilty of any wrongdoing but rather because the media frenzy around these questions kept me from being the effective leader I wanted and needed to be.

In January 2019, Kitzhaber agreed to pay $20,000 in civil penalties to the Oregon Government Ethics Commission for conflicts of interest involving Hayes while he was governor. That month, Hayes also agreed to pay the Commission fines totaling "$44,000 for ethics violations arising from her use of public office for personal profit."

== Activities outside governorship ==
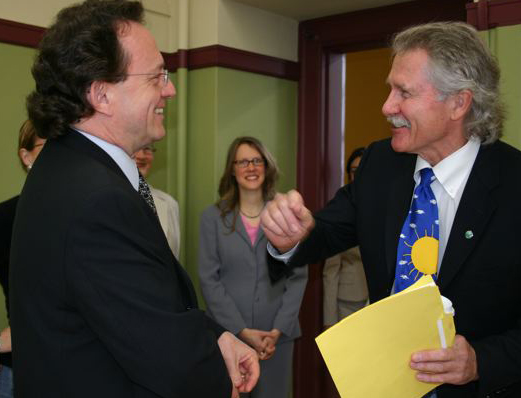
Dr. Kitzhaber (right) speaking with Dr. David Schleich at the National University of Natural Medicine promoting the Archimedes Movement, a health care reform movement.

Kitzhaber serves as the director of the Center for Evidence Based Policy at Oregon Health & Science University in Portland, Oregon. He holds an endowed chair on health care policy at The Foundation for Medical Excellence, an educational foundation that produces continuing-education programs for physicians. Kitzhaber also serves as the president of the Estes Park Institute, a continuing-education organization for community health care leaders and hospital executives.

On January 13, 2006, Kitzhaber announced the Archimedes Movement, an organization seeking to maximize the health of the population by creating a sustainable system which uses the public resources spent on health care to ensure that everyone has access to a defined set of effective health services. The goal is to create a vision for a more equitable and sustainable system as well as the political tension necessary for its realization. A legislative proposal that took input from many Oregon residents was introduced in the 2007 Oregon legislative session.

The Oregon Better Health Act failed to pass the 2007 Legislature after Kitzhaber was unable to overcome concerns raised by AARP about his inclusion of Medicare in his plan. Another health reform bill, a Senate proposal which was amended to include portions of the Archimedes Movement bill, passed instead.

With the withdrawal of Tom Daschle's candidacy for United States Secretary of Health and Human Services, there was speculation Kitzhaber could be tapped for the position. However, Kitzhaber denied interest in the position and said that he was not being vetted.

On February 7, 2014, Kitzhaber endorsed fellow Democrat Donald Berwick for governor of Massachusetts. On May 2, 2016, Kitzhaber announced his endorsement for Vermont Senator Bernie Sanders in his 2016 race for the Democratic presidential nomination.

== Personal life ==
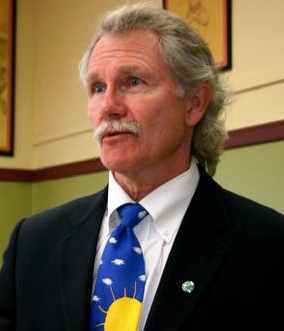
Kitzhaber in 2008

Kitzhaber is of German descent. He married Rosemary Linehan in 1971; they divorced in 1974. He married Sharon LaCroix in 1995 and had one son, Logan, who was born in October 1997. The couple sought a divorce in 2003, soon after the end of his second term as governor.

Kitzhaber lives with his fiancée Cylvia Hayes, founder of the environmental consulting firm 3EStrategies. In August 2014, the couple announced their engagement; no wedding date has been announced.

During his political career, Kitzhaber became famous for wearing blue jeans during speaking engagements. When he wore jeans to his inauguration in 1995, he created a minor stir. During his 2010 campaign for a third term as governor, Kitzhaber frequently avoided the necktie as well, preferring a button-down shirt and suit jacket with no tie.

Kitzhaber lives and works in Portland, and declined to use the official gubernatorial residence of Mahonia Hall in Salem during his service as governor.

== Electoral history ==
Oregon gubernatorial Democratic primary election, 1994
Party	Candidate	Votes	%
Democratic	John Kitzhaber	250,514	88.48%
Democratic	Paul Damian Wells	30,052	10.61%
	miscellaneous	2,570	0.91%
Total votes		283,136	100.00%

Oregon gubernatorial general election, 1994
Party	Candidate	Votes	%
Democratic	John Kitzhaber	622,083	50.95%
Republican	Denny Smith	517,874	42.41%
American	Ed Hickam	58,449	4.79%
Libertarian	Danford P. Vander Ploeg	20,183	1.65%
	write-ins	195	0.02%
	miscellaneous	2,226	0.18%
Total votes		1,221,010	100.00%

Oregon gubernatorial Democratic primary election, 1998
Party	Candidate	Votes	%
Democratic	John Kitzhaber	271,781	87.74%
Democratic	Dave Foley	23,870	7.71%
Democratic	Paul Damian Wells	11,933	3.85%
	miscellaneous	2,161	0.70%
Total votes		309,745	100.00%

Oregon gubernatorial general election, 1998
Party	Candidate	Votes	%
Democratic	John Kitzhaber	717,061	64.42%
Republican	Bill Sizemore	334,001	30.01%
Libertarian	Richard P. Burke	20,200	1.81%
Pacific Green	Blair Bobier	15,843	1.42%
Reform	Roger G. Weidner	10,144	0.91%
Natural Law	Patti Steurer	7,823	0.70%
Socialist	Trey Smith	5,772	0.52%
	miscellaneous	2,254	0.20%
Total votes		1,113,098	100.00%

Oregon gubernatorial Democratic primary election, 2010
Party	Candidate	Votes	%
Democratic	John Kitzhaber	242,545	64.78
Democratic	Bill Bradbury	110,298	29.46
Democratic	Roger Obrist	16,057	4.29
	write-ins	5,504	1.47
Total votes		374,404	100

Oregon gubernatorial Independent Party primary election, 2010
Party	Candidate	Votes	%
Democratic	John Kitzhaber	850	38.39
Independent Party	Richard Esterman	438	19.78
	write-ins	314	14.18
Independent Party	None of the above	312	14.09
Progressive	Jerry Wilson	300	13.55
Total votes		2,214	100

Oregon gubernatorial general election, 2010
Party	Candidate	Votes	%
Democratic	John Kitzhaber	716,525	49.29
Republican	Chris Dudley	694,287	47.76
Constitution	Greg Kord	20,475	1.41
Libertarian	Wes Wagner	19,048	1.31
	write-ins	3,213	0.22
Total votes		1,453,548	100

Oregon gubernatorial Democratic primary election, 2014
Party	Candidate	Votes	%
Democratic	John Kitzhaber	268,654	89.0
Democratic	Ifeanyichukwu C. Diru	27,833	9.22
	write-ins	5,388	1.78
Total votes		301,875	100

Oregon gubernatorial general election, 2014
Party	Candidate	Votes	%
Democratic	John Kitzhaber	733,230	49.89
Republican	Dennis Richardson	648,542	44.13
Pacific Green	Jason Levin	29,561	2.01
Libertarian	Paul Grad	21,903	1.49
Constitution	Aaron Auer	15,929	1.08
Progressive	Chris Henry	13,898	0.95
	write-ins	6,654	0.45
Total votes		1,469,717	100

== See also ==
- List of governors of Oregon
- Governorship of John Kitzhaber

Party political offices
Preceded by Barbara Roberts	Democratic nominee for Governor of Oregon; 1994, 1998	Succeeded by Ted Kulongoski
Preceded by Ted Kulongoski	Democratic nominee for Governor of Oregon; 2010, 2014	Succeeded by Kate Brown
Political offices
Preceded by Barbara Roberts	Governor of Oregon; 1995–2003	Succeeded by Ted Kulongoski
Preceded by Ted Kulongoski	Governor of Oregon; 2011–2015	Succeeded by Kate Brown
U.S. order of precedence (ceremonial)
Preceded by Barbara Roberts as Former Governor	Order of precedence of the United States	Succeeded by Ted Kulongoski as Former Governor
