= Tina Kotek =

Governor of Oregon since 2023

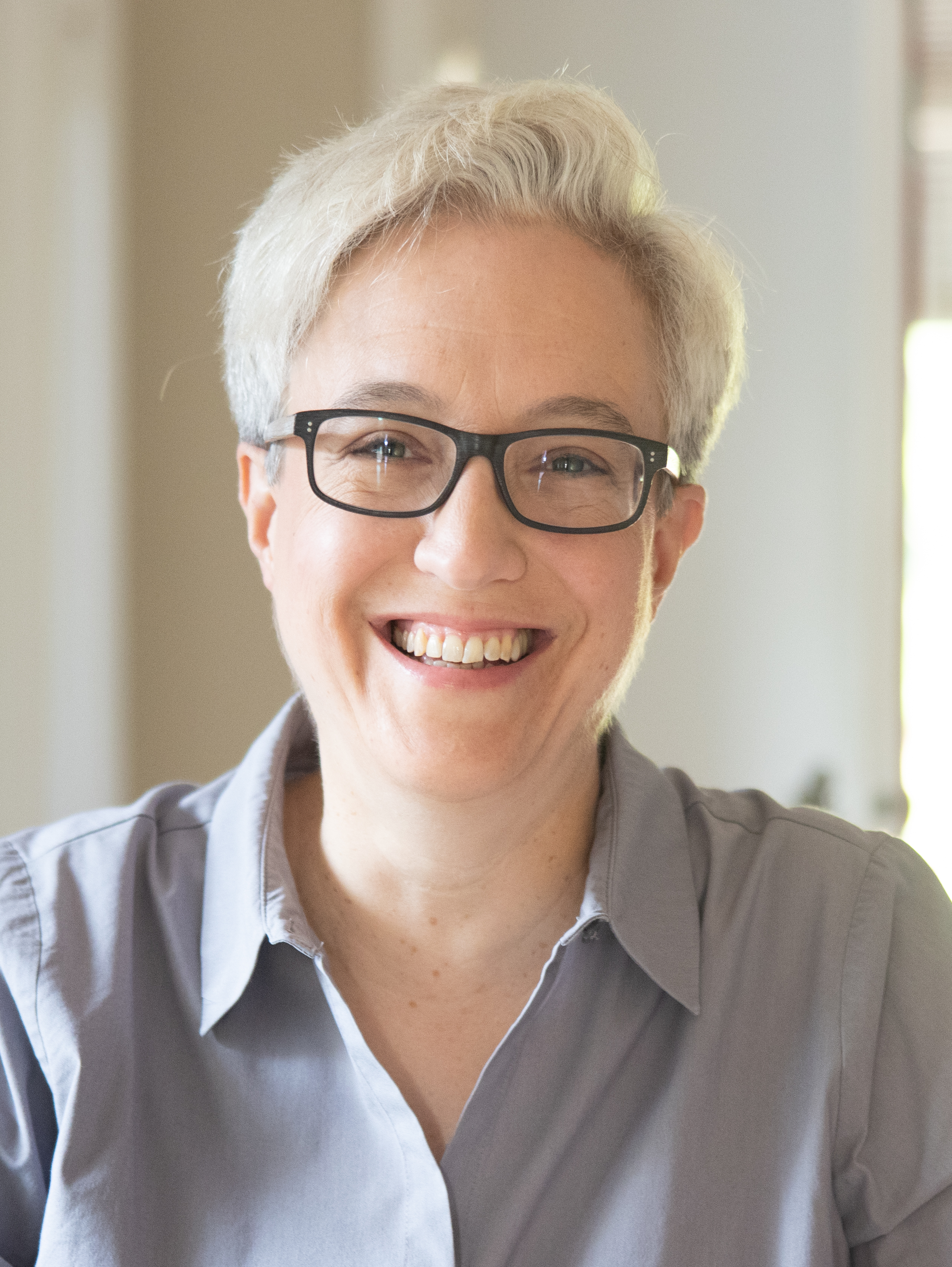
- Kotek in 2021

39th Governor of Oregon
- Incumbent
- Assumed office January 9, 2023
- Preceded by: Kate Brown

67th Speaker of the Oregon House of Representatives
- In office January 14, 2013 – January 16, 2022
- Preceded by: Bruce Hanna; Arnie Roblan
- Succeeded by: Paul Holvey (acting)
Leadership roles
Majority Leader of the Oregon House of Representatives
In office June 30, 2011 – January 14, 2013 Serving with Kevin Cameron
Preceded by	Dave Hunt
Succeeded by	Val Hoyle
Speaker pro tempore of the Oregon House of Representatives
In office January 10, 2011 – June 30, 2011 Serving with Andy Olson
Preceded by	Arnie Roblan
Succeeded by	Peter J. Buckley

Member of the Oregon House of Representatives from the 44th district
- In office January 8, 2007 – January 21, 2022
- Preceded by: Gary Hansen
- Succeeded by: Travis Nelson

Personal details
- Born: Christine Kotek; September 30, 1966 (age 60) York, Pennsylvania, U.S.
- Party: Democratic
- Spouse: Aimee Wilson (m. 2017)
- Education: Georgetown University (attended); University of Oregon (BS); University of Washington (MA)
- Website: Office website Campaign website
- Kotek's voice Kotek welcomes home members of the Oregon National Guard. Recorded September 9, 2024

Christine "Tina" Kotek (/ˈkoʊtɛk/ KOH-tek; born September 30, 1966) is an American politician and former public policy advocate who has served as the 39th governor of Oregon since 2023. A member of the Democratic Party, Kotek served from 2007 to 2022 as a member of the Oregon House of Representatives from the 44th district and from 2013 to 2022 as speaker of the Oregon House of Representatives.

Kotek became the first openly lesbian woman elected speaker of a U.S. state house in 2013. She is the longest-serving speaker in Oregon House history, having served nine years. She was elected governor of Oregon in 2022 and reelected in 2026. She is one of the first two openly lesbian women elected governor of a U.S. state, as well as the third woman elected governor of Oregon.

== Early life and education ==
Kotek was born on September 30, 1966, in York, Pennsylvania, to Jerry Albert Kotek and Florence (née Matich). Her father was of Czech ancestry, and her mother's parents were Slovenes. Her grandfather František Kotek was a baker from Týnec nad Labem.

Kotek graduated second in her class from Dallastown Area High School. She attended Georgetown University, but left without graduating. She then worked in commercial diving and as a travel agent.

In 1987, Kotek moved to Oregon. She earned a Bachelor of Science degree in religious studies from the University of Oregon in 1990. She then studied at the University of Washington, earning a master's degree in international studies and comparative religion.

== Career ==
Before being elected to office, Kotek worked as a public policy advocate for the Oregon Food Bank and then as policy director of Children First for Oregon. She co-chaired the Human Services Coalition of Oregon during the 2002 budget crisis and co-chaired the Governor's Medicaid Advisory Committee.

=== Oregon House of Representatives ===
==== Elections ====
In 2004, Kotek lost the Democratic primary for Oregon House District 43. In 2006, she won a three-way Democratic primary for Oregon House District 44, which includes North and Northeast Portland. In the general election, she defeated her Republican opponent with nearly 80% of the vote.

Kotek ran unopposed for reelection in 2008. In 2010, she faced a Democratic primary challenge but won over 85% of the vote. Kotek won the 2010 general election with almost 81% of the vote. She was reelected every two years through 2020.

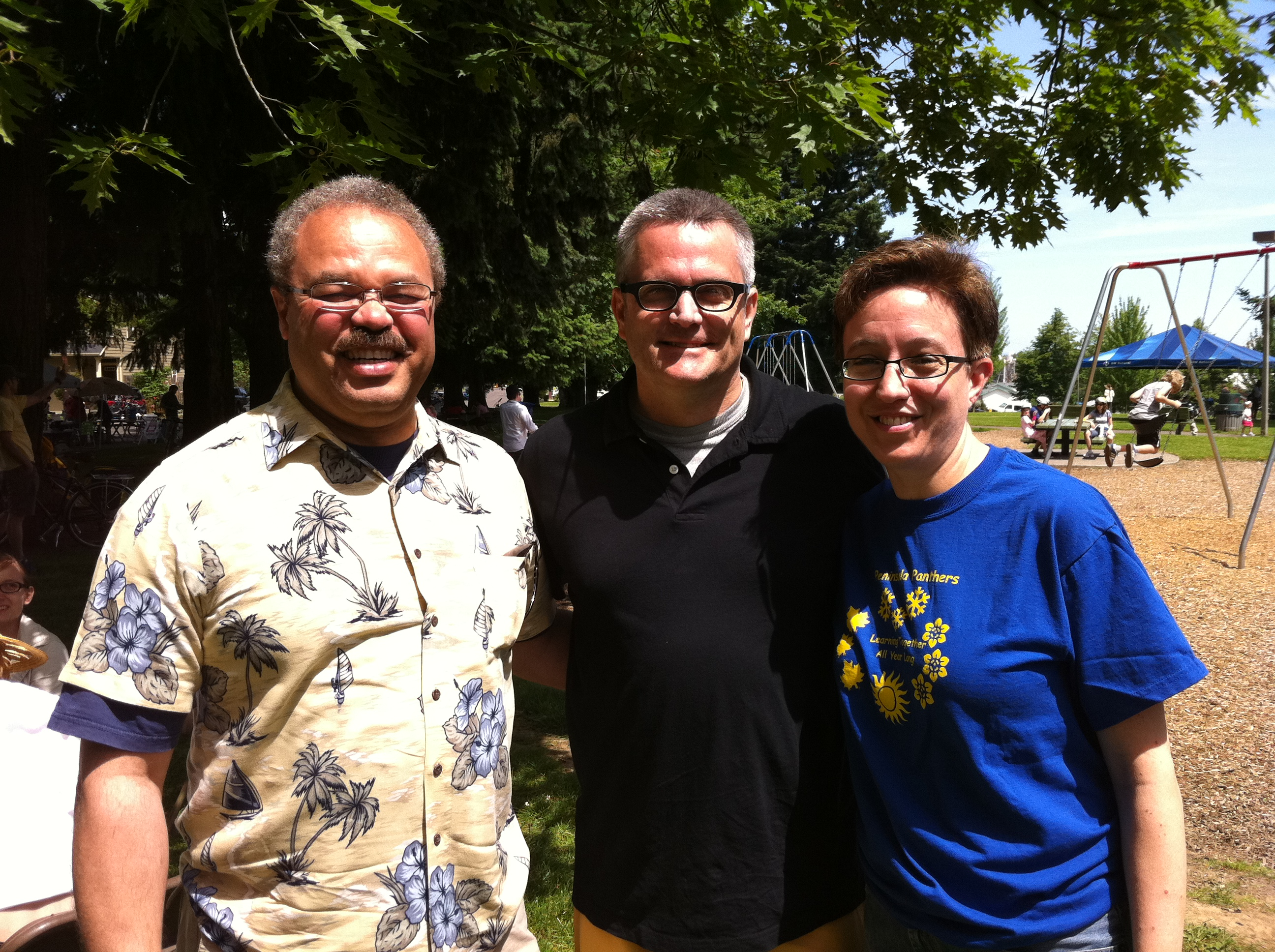
Kotek with Portland Mayor Sam Adams and fellow State Representative Lew Frederick posing for a photo at a Sunday Parkways event in Portland

==== Pre-speakership House career ====
Kotek rose in the House leadership, serving as the Democratic whip in the 2009 legislative session. In the 2011 session, she was co-speaker pro tempore with Republican Andy Olson due to the House's 30–30 partisan split.

In June 2011, the House Democratic Caucus chose Kotek as its leader (succeeding Dave Hunt).

==== Speakership ====
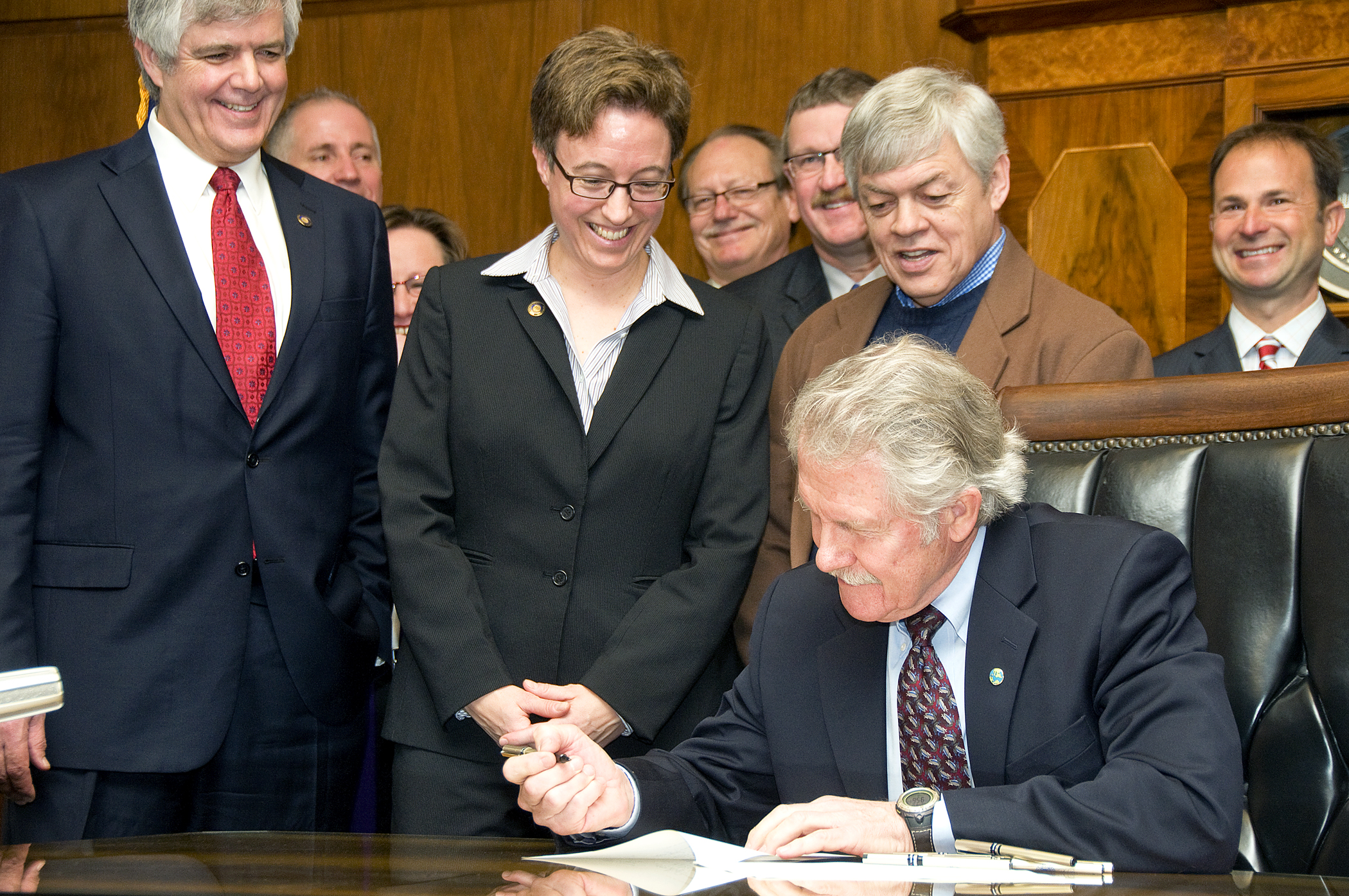
Speaker Kotek with then State Representative Cliff Bentz, looking on as Governor John Kitzhaber signs HB2800, authorizing funding for the Columbia River Crossing

After Democrats won a House majority in the 2012 election, they nominated Kotek for speaker of the House for the 2013 legislative session. She was elected to the position, becoming the first out lesbian in the nation to serve as a legislative speaker. She was reelected for in 2015, 2017, 2019, and 2021. Kotek is Oregon's longest-serving speaker of the House.

In December 2016, Kotek became the chair of the board of directors of the Democratic Legislative Campaign Committee. She left the post in July 2019.

In 2020, Republicans worked with Democrats to redraw the districts following the 2020 U.S. census with equal representation from the Democratic and Republican parties as a compromise to have the Republicans stop the use of quorum rule restrictions to stall legislation. Kotek later reversed her decision and restored the Democratic majority on the committee redrawing the congressional districts.

In January 2022, Kotek announced her resignation from the House to focus on her gubernatorial campaign. She was succeeded as speaker by Dan Rayfield and in the 44th district by Travis Nelson.

During her time as speaker, Kotek introduced legislation to allow for increased housing construction in Oregon. In 2017, she unsuccessfully pushed for legislation to permit duplexes in residential neighborhoods that were previously exclusively zoned for single-family housing. Her House Bill 2001, which sought to enable missing middle housing, required cities of more than 10,000 and counties of more than 15,000 to allow fourplexes in neighborhoods previously zoned exclusively for single-family housing, and to permit accessory dwelling units and easier rules for subdividing existing homes. The bill passed in 2019, making Oregon the first state to abolish single-family exclusive zoning across the state.

== Governor of Oregon (2023–present) ==
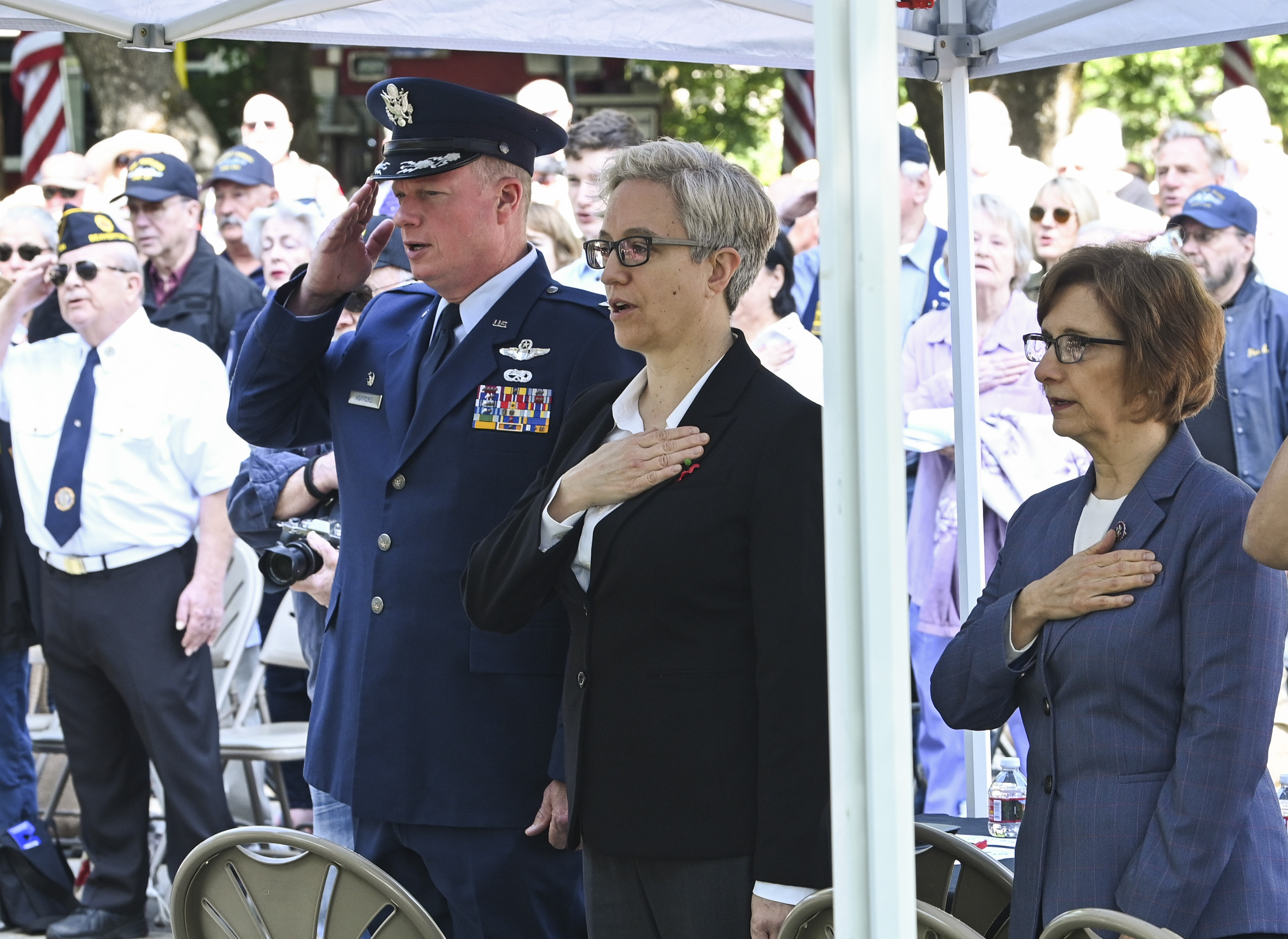
Kotek and Congresswoman Suzanne Bonamici at a 2023 Memorial Day ceremony in Beaverton

=== 2022 gubernatorial campaign ===
On September 1, 2021, Kotek declared her candidacy in the 2022 Oregon gubernatorial election, seeking to succeed the term-limited Governor Kate Brown. Her main opponent in the Democratic primary was State Treasurer Tobias Read. She won the Democratic primary on May 17, 2022.

In the general election, Kotek's main opponents were Republican nominee and former state representative Christine Drazan and unaffiliated candidate and former state senator Betsy Johnson.

Kotek won the November 8 election with 47% of the vote to Drazan's 43.5%. Kotek and Maura Healey, elected governor of Massachusetts the same day, became the first openly lesbian governors in the United States.

=== 2026 gubernatorial campaign ===
Kotek announced on December 5, 2025, that she would seek a second term as governor. Her campaign framed the race around defending Oregon from the policies of the second Trump administration. In May 2026, Kotek won the Democratic primary with more than 85% of the vote, setting up another contest against Drazan in the 2026 Oregon gubernatorial election.

In September 2026, Kotek released a reelection platform titled "Building Oregon's Future Together."

Kotek was reelected on November 3, 2026, receiving 53.3% of the vote to Drazan's 43.7%.

=== Tenure ===
Kotek was sworn in on January 9, 2023. On her first day in office, she declared a state of emergency due to homelessness. She established a statewide goal of building 36,000 new housing units a year (up from the 22,000 that were being built in the state when she took office). At the time she took office, Oregon was ranked as one of the states most severely underproducing housing relative to demand.

In March 2024, Kotek signed bipartisan legislation to put $376 million toward housing production, including a $75 million revolving loan fund to enable localities to build affordable housing, $131 million for emergency housing, $123.5 to enable localities to acquire and develop shovel-ready housing, and $24.5 million to improve the energy efficiency and air quality in housing. She initially proposed $500 million but legislators considered that too much. In 2025, Kotek signed additional bipartisan legislation to spur the construction of "middle housing", such as duplexes, triplexes, townhomes, and modular homes.

Education policy has been a focus for Kotek's first term. In June 2025, she signed a law to prohibit schools or libraries from implementing book bans based solely on discrimination against the subject or author's protected characteristics; the law allows for complaints to be filed and reviewed by a district committee for content appropriateness. In July 2025, Kotek ordered all Oregon school districts to ban student phone use during the school day, with the stated goal of improving student mental health, academic outcomes, and well-being. The ban has some medical exceptions. Kotek said in March 2026 that all Oregon school districts had implemented the ban. In April 2026, Kotek issued an executive order blocking further reductions in student instructional time, including for budgetary reasons, as Oregon had a shorter school year than the national average. In June 2026, she signed a law making Dolly Parton's Imagination Library, a literacy program that provides books to children under five, an official state program.

In April 2024, Kotek signed a law amending the drug policy of Oregon. It amended the policy that had been approved by 2020 Oregon Ballot Measure 110 by recriminalizing possession of small amounts of substances such as heroin, cocaine, and methamphetamine, making it punishable as a misdemeanor by up to six months in jail. It also allows law enforcement to divert offenders into mental health or addiction services instead.

In 2024, three of Kotek's top aides, including her chief of staff and deputy chief of staff, resigned after registering concerns about the role of the governor's wife, Aimee Kotek Wilson, in her administration. Backlash centered on hiring paid staff for a new "Office of the First Spouse" and Wilson's frequent involvement in policy meetings. Kotek later responded by halting plans to create a formal office and issuing a "First Partner Handbook". The Oregon Government Ethics Commission declined to investigate the issue after a complaint was filed, on the grounds that Wilson had not gained financially from her actions.

Kotek signed the POWER Act (House Bill 3546) in June 2025. The law required companies with facilities such as data centers or large cryptocurrency mining operations to pay more for their own electric costs. It was filed in response to the relative impact on utility rates for residential homes. In October 2026, Kotek ordered environmental regulators to freeze air or water permits for new or expanded data centers until July 1, 2027.

In September 2025, Kotek formed the West Coast Health Alliance with California Governor Gavin Newsom and Washington Governor Bob Ferguson. The alliance issues vaccine recommendations independently of the federal government, and they said it was in response to politicization of the U.S. Centers for Disease Control and Prevention (CDC) under the second Trump administration. The alliance instead derives vaccine recommendations from national medical associations.

Responding to President Trump's deployment of federal troops to Portland, a lawsuit against the Trump administration was announced in September 2025 by Kotek, Oregon attorney general Dan Rayfield, and Portland Mayor Keith Wilson. Kotek said in October 2025 that domestic military deployments by the second Trump administration were "an abuse of power" and "a threat to our democracy". Judge Karin Immergut blocked the deployments in Oregon with rulings in October and November 2025.

In January 2026, Kotek criticized a shooting by a federal agent in Portland, calling it a "terrible, unnecessary violent event" and blaming the Trump administration's controversial recent deployment of federal agents to Portland. She called for an investigation into the details of the incident.

In response to the 2025 United States federal government shutdown and the resulting 2025 SNAP shutdown, Kotek directed $5 million to Oregon food banks and $1 million to nine federally recognized tribes. It was matched by $6 million from the Oregon Disaster Funders Network.

In November 2025, Kotek signed House Bill 3991, a transportation funding bill that increased the state gas tax and payroll taxes and vehicle title and registration fees. The bill initially passed as an emergency in special assembly, which allowed it to bypass voter approval. But after opponents gathered over 200,000 signatures the measure was taken to a public vote in May 2026 and defeated. Kotek blamed the 2026 Iran war for increasing gas prices and making it difficult for voters to support the bill.

In September 2026, Kotek issued an executive order to regulate artificial intelligence (AI), with a goal of AI safety. Kotek said, "While oversight and regulation would be strongest and most effective at the federal level, President Trump continues to dismiss the need for even the most basic guardrails." Kotek said that Oregon "cannot simply wait for the private sector to self-regulate a technology that poses such an existential and evolving risk." The order instructs the production of third-party AI safety assessments and guardrails related to "procurement and use of frontier AI models". It examines the possibility of an AI "kill switch" requirement.

== Personal life ==
Kotek and her wife, Aimee Kotek Wilson, met in 2005 and married in a private ceremony in 2017. They lived together in Portland's Kenton neighborhood beginning in 2005. Kotek was one of the Oregon Legislative Assembly's few openly LGBTQ+ members and the first lesbian speaker of a state house. After winning the gubernatorial election, she sold her Portland home and moved to the governor's mansion, Mahonia Hall, in Salem. Kotek considers herself a lapsed Catholic and attends an Episcopal church.

== Electoral history ==
=== Oregon House of Representatives ===
2006 Oregon State Representative, 44th district
Party	Candidate	Votes	%
Democratic	Tina Kotek	13,931	78.8
Republican	Jay Kushner	3,645	20.6
Write-in		97	0.5
Total votes		17,673	100%

2008 Oregon State Representative, 44th district
Party	Candidate	Votes	%
Democratic	Tina Kotek	20,044	97.6
Write-in		490	2.4
Total votes		20,534	100%

2010 Oregon State Representative, 44th district
Party	Candidate	Votes	%
Democratic	Tina Kotek	16,517	80.9
Republican	Kitty C Harmon	3,812	18.7
Write-in		75	0.4
Total votes		20,404	100%

2012 Oregon State Representative, 44th district
Party	Candidate	Votes	%
Democratic	Tina Kotek	23,235	86.3
Republican	Michael Harrington	3,557	13.2
Write-in		126	0.5
Total votes		26,918	100%

2014 Oregon State Representative, 44th district
Party	Candidate	Votes	%
Democratic	Tina Kotek	19,760	85.5
Republican	Michael H Harrington	3,151	13.6
Write-in		193	0.8
Total votes		23,104	100%

2016 Oregon State Representative, 44th district
Party	Candidate	Votes	%
Democratic	Tina Kotek	23,288	79.7
Pacific Green	Joe Rowe	5,700	19.5
Write-in		241	0.8
Total votes		29,229	100%

2018 Oregon State Representative, 44th district
Party	Candidate	Votes	%
Democratic	Tina Kotek	27,194	89.1
Libertarian	Manny Guerra	3,181	10.4
Write-in		155	0.5
Total votes		30,530	100%

2020 Oregon State Representative, 44th district
Party	Candidate	Votes	%
Democratic	Tina Kotek	32,465	87.2
Republican	Margo Logan	4,643	12.5
Write-in		127	0.3
Total votes		37,235	100%

=== Governor of Oregon ===
Oregon Gubernatorial Democratic Primary Election, 2022
Party	Candidate	Votes	%
Democratic	Tina Kotek	275,301	57.6%
Democratic	Tobias Read	156,017	32.6%
Democratic	Patrick Starnes	10,524	2.2%
Democratic	George Carrillo	9,365	1.9%
Democratic	Michael Trimble	5,000	1.0%
Democratic	John Sweeney	4,193	0.9%
Democratic	Julian Bell	3,926	0.8%
Democratic	Dave Stauffer	2,302	0.5%
Democratic	Wilson Bright	2,316	0.5%
Democratic	Ifeanyichukwu Diru	1,780	0.4%
Democratic	Keisha Marchant	1,755	0.4%
Democratic	Genevieve Wilson	1,588	0.3%
Democratic	Michael Cross	1,342	0.3%
Democratic	David Beem	1,308	0.3%
Democratic	Peter Hall	982	0.2%
Total votes		491,445	100%

2022 Oregon gubernatorial election
Party	Candidate	Votes	%
Democratic	Tina Kotek	916,635	46.9%
Republican	Christine Drazan	849,853	43.5%
Independent	Betsy Johnson	168,363	8.6%
Constitution	Donice Noelle Smith	8,047	0.4%
Libertarian	R. Leon Noble	6,862	0.3%
	Write-Ins	2,113	0.1%
Total votes		1,951,873	100%
Democratic hold			

2026 Oregon gubernatorial Democratic primary
Party	Candidate	Votes	%
Democratic	Tina Kotek (incumbent)	385,999	83.6
Democratic	Brittany N. Jones	13,939	3.0
Democratic	Forest "Fora" Alexander	12,684	2.8
Democratic	Miranda Weigler	10,161	2.2
Democratic	Tristan Sheppard	6,006	1.3
Democratic	James Atkinson IV	5,902	1.3
Democratic	David Beem	4,863	1.1
Democratic	Steve Laible	3,692	0.8
Democratic	Cal Kishawi	2,422	0.5
Democratic	Donnie Beckwith	1,799	0.4
Write-in		14,228	3.1
Total votes		461,695	100.0

2026 Oregon gubernatorial election
Party	Candidate	Votes	%	±%
Democratic	Tina Kotek (incumbent)	1,015,091	53.2	+4.7
Republican	Christine Drazan	834,774	43.8	+2.0
Pacific Green	Brett Smith	54,660	2.9	+2.9
Write-in				
Total votes			100.0	N/A

== See also ==
- List of female speakers of legislatures in the United States
- List of female governors in the United States
- List of LGBT people from Portland, Oregon

Oregon House of Representatives
Preceded by Arnie Roblan	Speaker pro tempore of the Oregon House of Representatives; 2011; Served alongside: Andy Olson	Succeeded by Peter J. Buckley
Preceded by Dave Hunt	Majority Leader of the Oregon House of Representatives; 2011–2013; Served alongside: Kevin Cameron	Succeeded by Val Hoyle
Political offices
Preceded by Bruce Hanna; Arnie Roblan	Speaker of the Oregon House of Representatives; 2013–2022	Succeeded by Paul Holvey; Acting
Preceded by Kate Brown	Governor of Oregon; 2023–present	Incumbent
Party political offices
Preceded by Kate Brown	Democratic nominee for Governor of Oregon; 2022, 2026	Most recent
U.S. order of precedence (ceremonial)
Preceded by JD Vance as Vice President	Order of precedence of the United States; Within Oregon	Succeeded by Mayor of city in which event is held
Preceded by JD Vance as Vice President	Order of precedence of the United States; Within Oregon	Succeeded by Otherwise Mike Johnson as Speaker of the House
Preceded by Tim Walz as Governor of Minnesota	Order of precedence of the United States; Outside Oregon	Succeeded by Laura Kelly as Governor of Kansas
