= Mahonia Hall =

Gubernatorial residence for Oregon

- T. A. Livesley House
- U.S. National Register of Historic Places
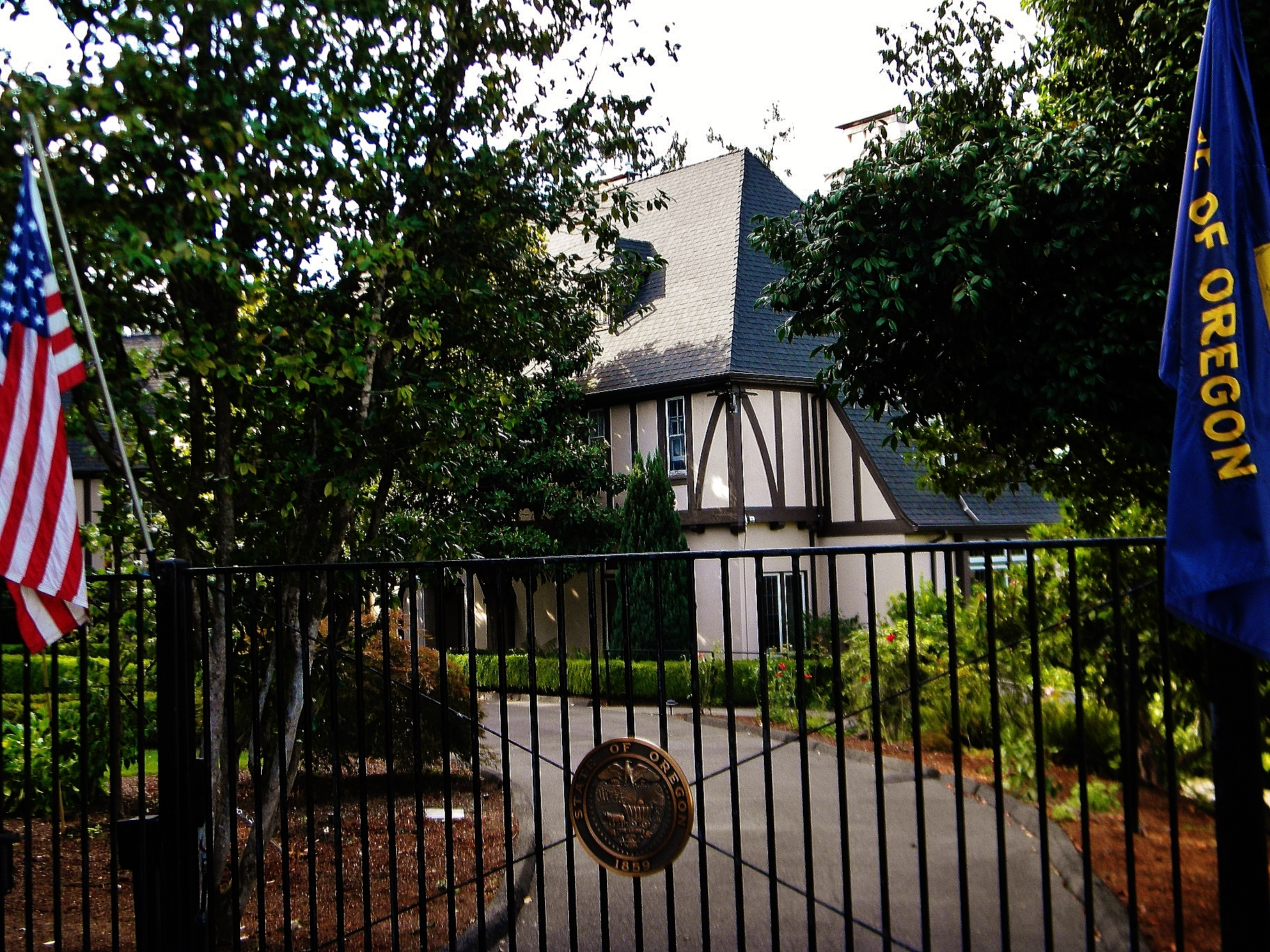

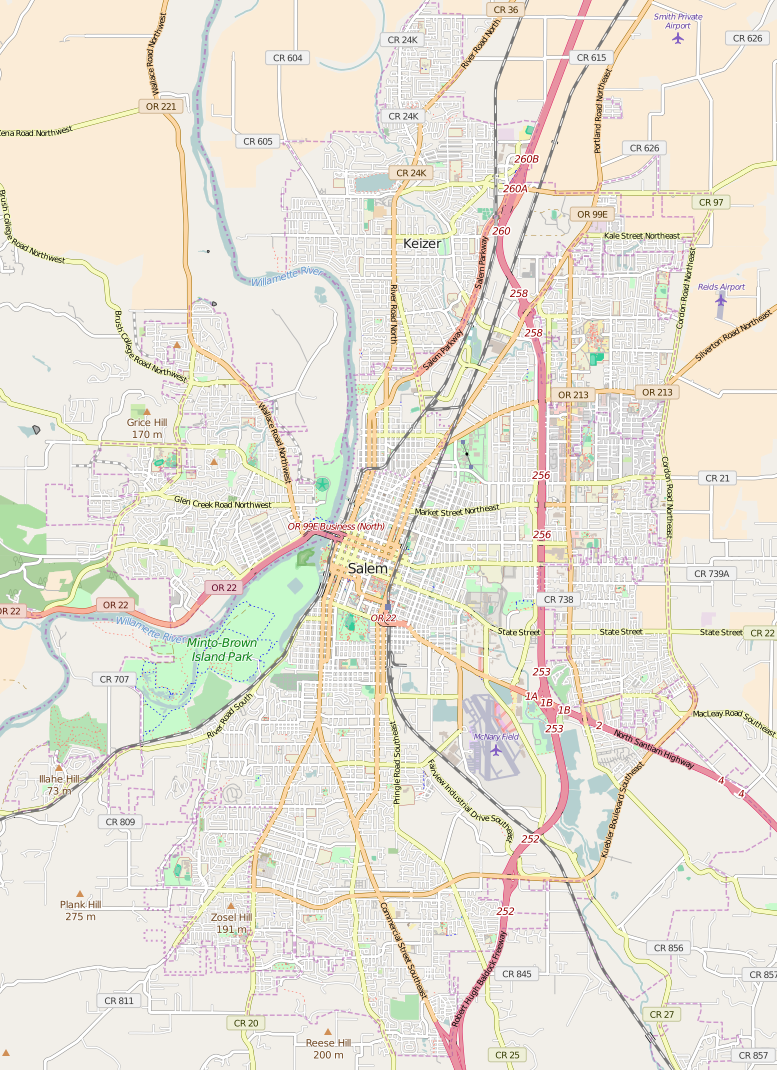
- Location within Salem OR Location within Oregon
- Location: 533 Lincoln Street S Salem, Oregon, U.S.
- Coordinates: 44.9257°N 123.0505°W
- Area: 0.81 acres (0.33 ha)
- Built: 1924
- Architect: Ellis F. Lawrence
- Architectural style: Tudor Revival
- NRHP reference No.: 90000684
- Added to NRHP: April 26, 1990

Mahonia Hall is the official residence of the governor of Oregon, in Oregon's capital city, Salem. The state acquired the building in 1988 with private donations. It is also known as the T. A. Livesley House or Thomas and Edna Livesley Mansion, after its original owners. The house was renamed Mahonia Hall after the scientific name of the Oregon-grape, Mahonia aquifolium, Oregon's state flower. The Oregonian held a naming contest in 1988, and Eric Johnson, a 13-year-old from Salem, came up with the winning entry. Other finalists were The Eyrie, Trail's End, The Oregon House, and The Cascade House. Governor Neil Goldschmidt and his family were the first official residents.

The half-timber Tudor-style mansion was designed and built in 1924 by Ellis F. Lawrence, the founder of the University of Oregon School of Architecture, for hop farmer Thomas A. Livesley. The structure includes a ballroom on the third floor, a pipe organ, a wine cellar, and formal gardens; all were part of the original design. The home has 10,000 square feet (930 m^{2}) of space. Mahonia Hall was added to the National Register of Historic Places in 1990.

Governor Tina Kotek now resides in the mansion.

== See also ==
- National Register of Historic Places listings in Marion County, Oregon
