= Governor of Oregon =

Head of government of the U.S. state of Oregon

- Seal of Oregon

- State flag

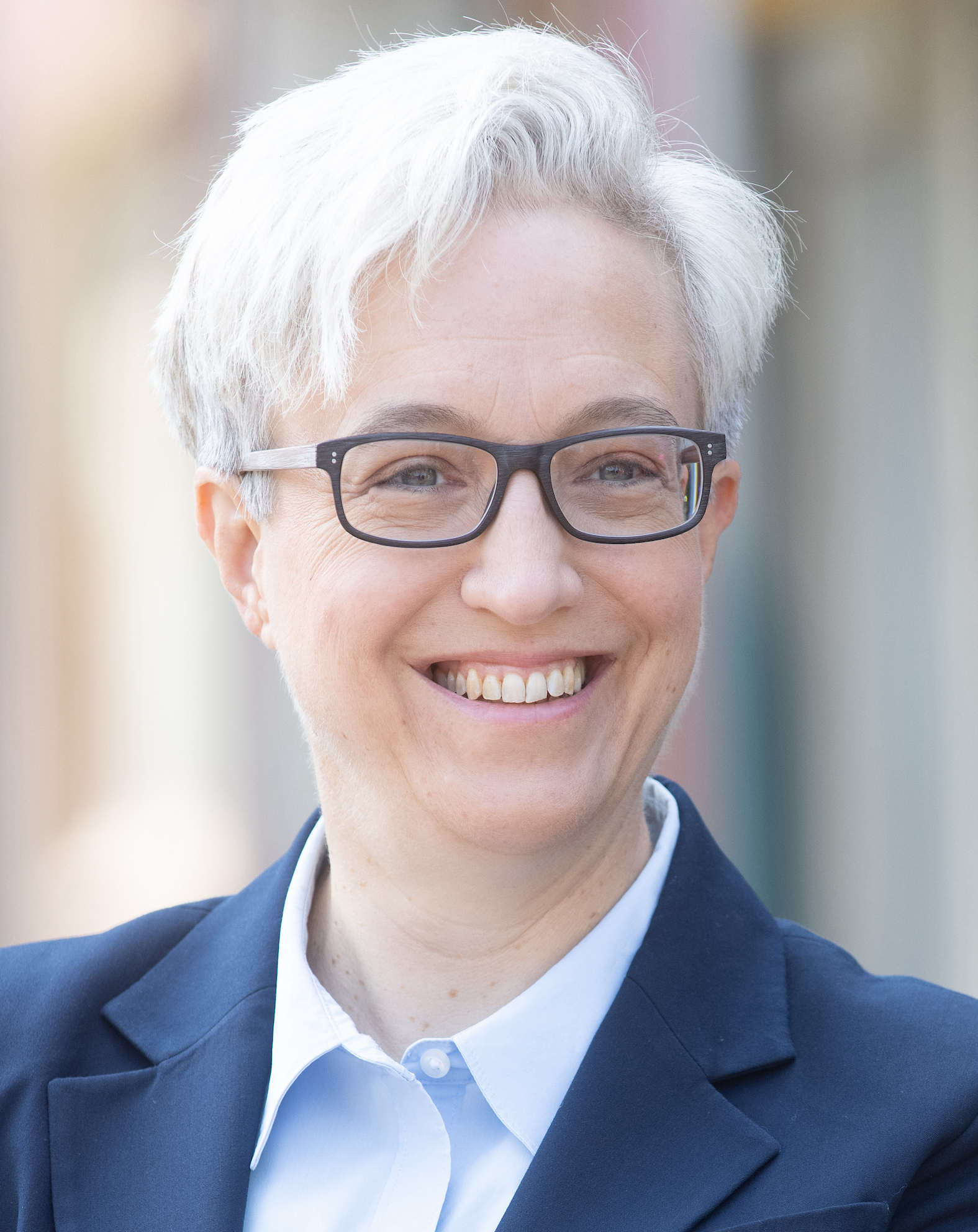
- Incumbent; Tina Kotek since January 9, 2023
- Government of Oregon
- Style: The Honorable
- Type: Head of government Commander-in-chief
- Residence: Mahonia Hall
- Term length: Four years, renewable once in a 12-year period
- Inaugural holder: John Whiteaker
- Formation: February 14, 1859 (Constitution of Oregon)
- Succession: Line of succession
- Salary: $98,600 (2018)
- Website: Official website

The governor of Oregon is the head of government of Oregon and serves as the commander-in-chief of the state's military forces. The title of governor was also applied to the office of Oregon's chief executive during the provisional and U.S. territorial governments.

The current governor of Oregon is Tina Kotek, who took office on January 9, 2023. The governor's salary as of 2018 is $98,600.

== Constitutional descriptions ==
Article V of the Oregon State Constitution sets up the legal framework of the Oregon Executive Branch.

=== Eligibility ===
Article V, Section 1 states that the governor must be a U.S. citizen, at least 30 years of age, and a resident of Oregon for at least three years before the candidate's election. Section 2 extends ineligibility as follows:

No member of Congress, or person holding any office under the United States, or under this State, or under any other power, shall fill the Office of Governor, except as may be otherwise provided in this Constitution.

Section 1 further sets the maximum number of consecutive years a governor may serve, specifying that

no person shall be eligible to such office more than Eight, in any period of twelve years.

There is no specified limit on the number of total terms. John Kitzhaber is the only governor to have served non-consecutive terms. Kate Brown, who completed Kitzhaber's final term after his resignation, was elected to an additional four-year term but was ineligible to run for a second term due to the restriction on serving more than eight years in a twelve-year span.

=== Elections and terms of office ===
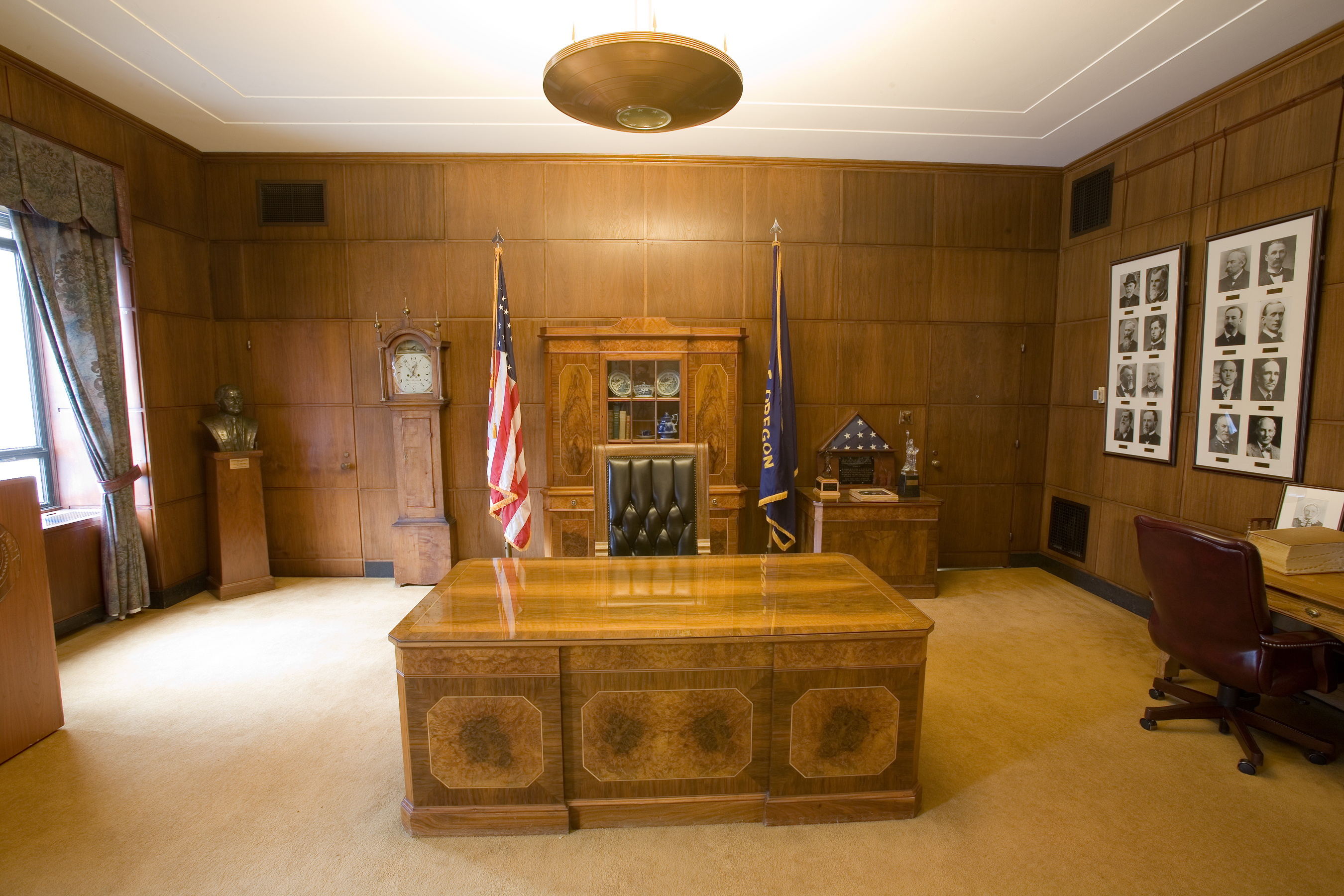
The ceremonial Governor's Office in the Oregon State Capitol

Sections 4-7 of Article V outline the formal gubernatorial election procedures such as publishing the winner, ties, disputed elections, and terms of office.

The formal process of certification of results of a gubernatorial election ends when the Secretary of State delivers the results to the Speaker of the Oregon House of Representatives. The Speaker then will publish the results to a joint session of the Oregon Legislative Assembly.

Where an election results in a tie, a joint session of the next legislative session will vote on the two candidates, and declare the winner governor. Legally contested elections are also decided by the full legislature in whichever manner other laws may prescribe.

=== Line of succession ===
The gubernatorial line of succession was modified in 1920, 1946, and 1972. The current list is designated as Article V, Section 8a. It defines who may become or act as the governor of Oregon upon the incapacity, death, resignation, or removal from office of a sitting governor. The new governor (or acting governor) will serve out the remainder of the previous governor's or incapacitated governor's term. A special gubernatorial election is required, if there's more than two years remaining in the previous governor's or incapacitated governor's term. Unlike many states, Oregon does not have a Lieutenant Governor (though in 2007, legislation was proposed to establish such an office.) The current order is:

Position		Current office holder	Political party
1	Secretary of State	Tobias Read	Democratic
2	State Treasurer	Elizabeth Steiner	Democratic
3	President of the Senate	Rob Wagner	Democratic
4	Speaker of the House	Julie Fahey	Democratic

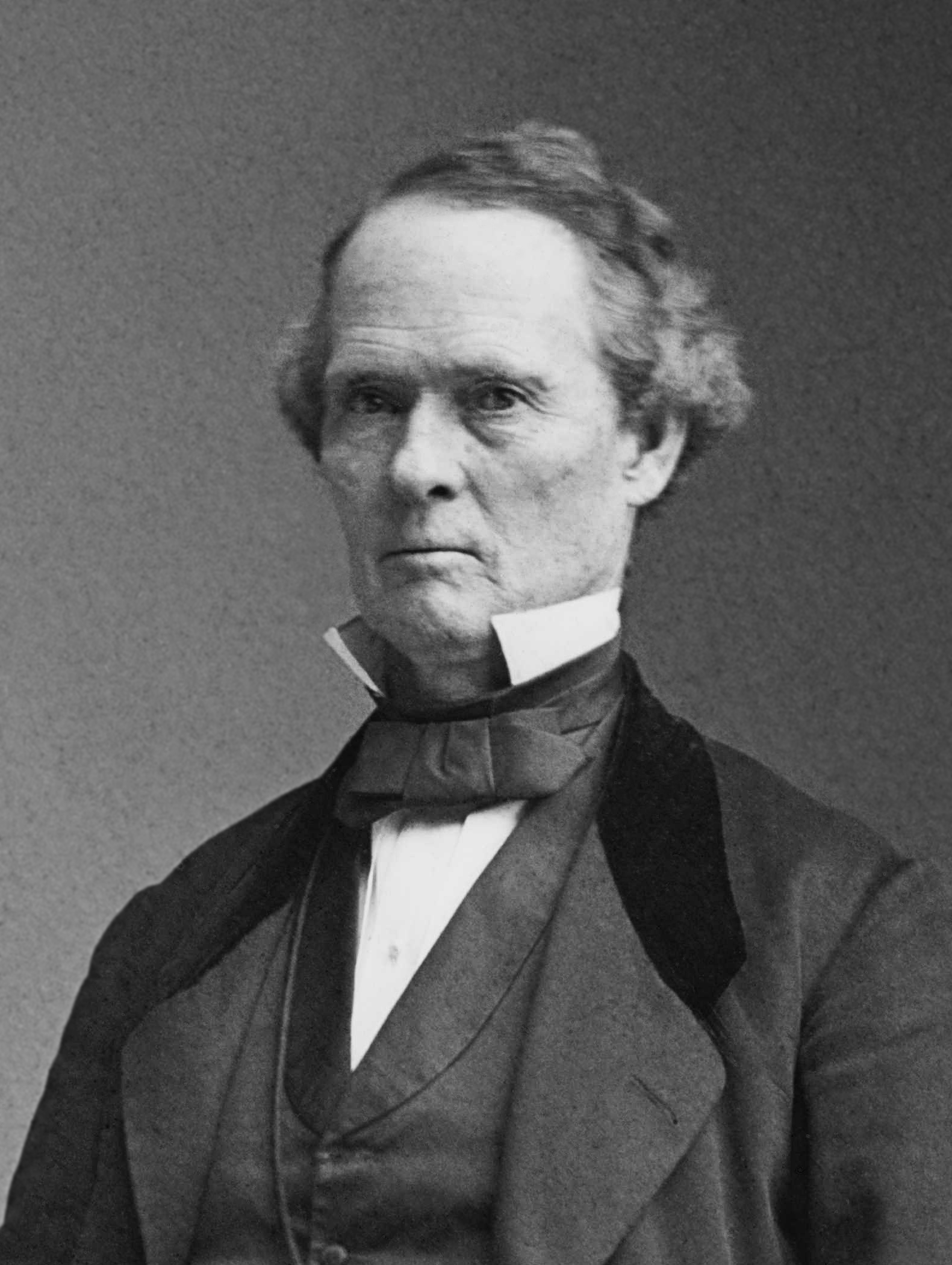
Joseph Lane was the Southern Democratic candidate for vice president in 1860. He lost to Abraham Lincoln and Hannibal Hamlin.

==== Transition events ====
Four governors have died in office, and five governors have resigned.

- After La Fayette Grover resigned in 1877 to become a United States Senator, Secretary of State Stephen F. Chadwick took office; he completed Grover's term and did not seek re-election.
- After George Chamberlain resigned in 1909 to become a United States Senator, Secretary of State Frank W. Benson took office.
- After Benson fell ill in 1910, he transferred his powers to President of the Senate Jay Bowerman, who was sworn in as Acting Governor. Bowerman then became governor upon Benson's resignation, and was defeated in the 1910 gubernatorial election.
- After the death of James Withycombe in 1919, Secretary of State Ben W. Olcott took office; he completed Withycombe's term and was defeated in the 1922 general election.
- After the death of Isaac L. Patterson in 1929, President of the Senate A. W. Norblad took office; he completed Patterson's term and was defeated in the 1930 Republican primary.
- After the death of Earl Snell in 1947, Speaker of the House John H. Hall took office; he lost a special election in 1948 and did not complete the term.
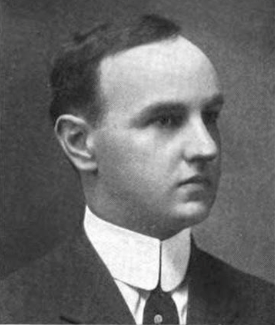
  Julius Meier was one of the founders of the Meier & Frank department store.
- After Douglas McKay resigned in 1952 to become United States Secretary of the Interior, President of the Senate Paul L. Patterson took office; he completed McKay's term and was elected in his own right in 1954.
- After Patterson's death in 1956, President of the Senate Elmo Smith took office; he lost a special election later that year and did not complete the term.
- After John Kitzhaber resigned in 2015 amid a growing ethics scandal, Secretary of State Kate Brown took office; she won a special election in 2016 and was re-elected in 2018.

=== State military forces ===
The governor is the commander-in-chief of the Oregon Military Department. Power is granted to the governor to mobilize and deploy state military forces.

=== Pardons ===
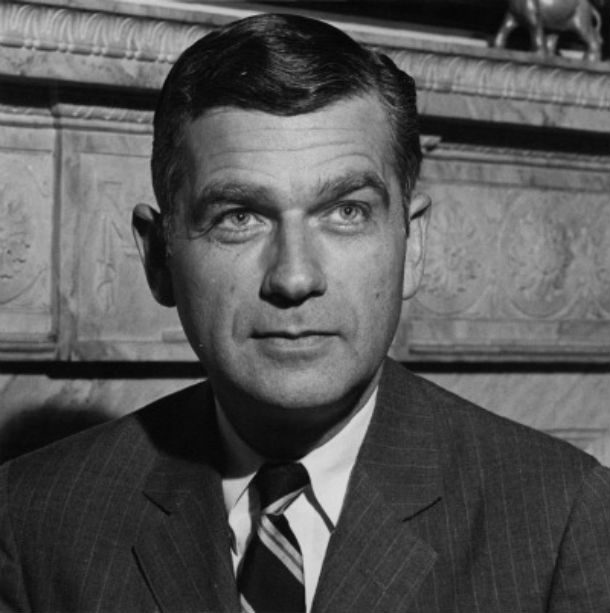
Mark Hatfield went on to become one of the most influential senators in Oregon history.

The power to grant pardons and reprieves and to commute sentences is granted to the governor, with limitations placed upon cases of treason. Additionally, the governor can remit fines and forfeitures. Any use of these powers, however, must be reported to the legislature.

In treason cases, the governor may only grant reprieves. The final matter of pardons, commuting of sentencing, or further reprieves is referred to the legislature in these cases.

=== Legislative ===
The governor has the power to veto legislation, which can be overridden by a two-thirds majority in both houses of the legislature, and can veto particular items from an appropriations or emergency bill while leaving others intact (see line item veto).

If needed, the governor may convene a special session of the legislature by proclamation and is empowered to call for special elections to fill vacant seats. Between the vacancy and special election, the governor is able to appoint a replacement if the appropriate county boards are unable to do so within the designated time period.

Annually, the governor addresses the legislature in their State of the State address. In this speech the governor outlines the current conditions of the state, and makes recommendations to the assembly as to what the government's priorities ought to be.

=== Appointments ===
If the legislature is out of session, the governor may appoint replacements to fill state offices until elections are held or the legislature reconvenes (see recess appointment).

== Official residence ==
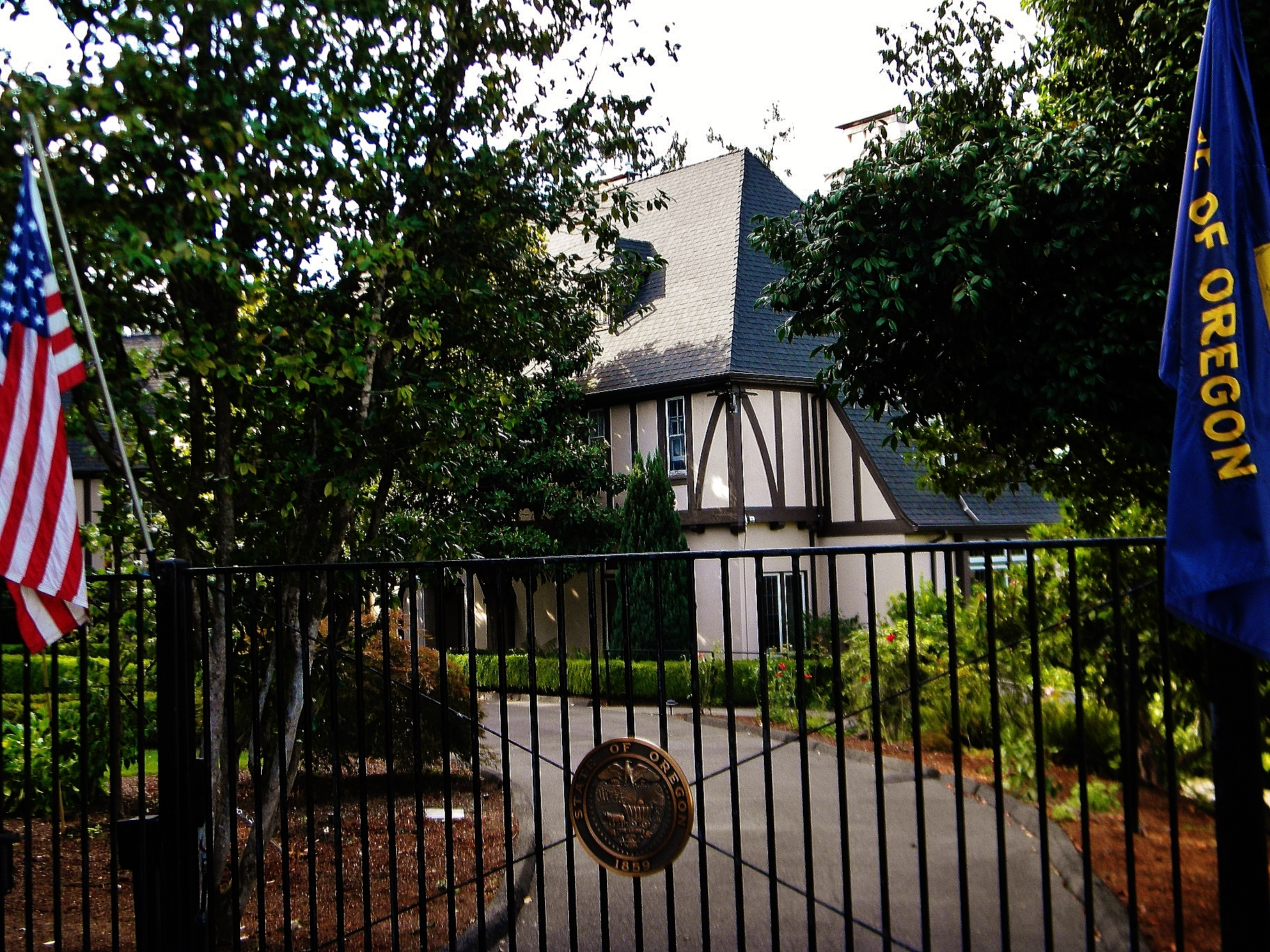
Mahonia Hall, the official residence of the governor of Oregon

Mahonia Hall in Salem is the official governor's mansion. The house was built in 1924 for hops grower Thomas A. Livesley. It was named Mahonia Hall after citizens raised funds in 1988 to purchase it as Oregon's first official governors' mansion.

Before the purchase of Mahonia Hall, whatever house the governor rented became the "Governor's mansion". Governors Atiyeh and McCall lived in the 1929 Stiff-Jarman House, an English cottage-style (also characterized as Arts and Crafts style) residence in the North Capitol Mall Historic Redevelopment area. After the end of Atiyeh's term, the Stiff-Jarman House became the headquarters of the Oregon Department of Environmental Quality. Today the building houses rented offices.

== Provisional government (1843–1849) ==
Meetings at Champoeg led up to the first constitution of the Oregon Country, and a petition for U.S. territorial status. The resulting acts also created this body as a provisional government for the region. The first executives of this government were a three-person, elected committee known as the Executive Committee. In 1845, elections for a chief executive were held. The first person in Oregon to hold the title of governor was George Abernethy, a prominent businessman.

== Timeline ==
Timeline of Oregon governors

== See also ==
- List of governors of Oregon
