= 1978 Oregon gubernatorial election =

- November 7, 1978
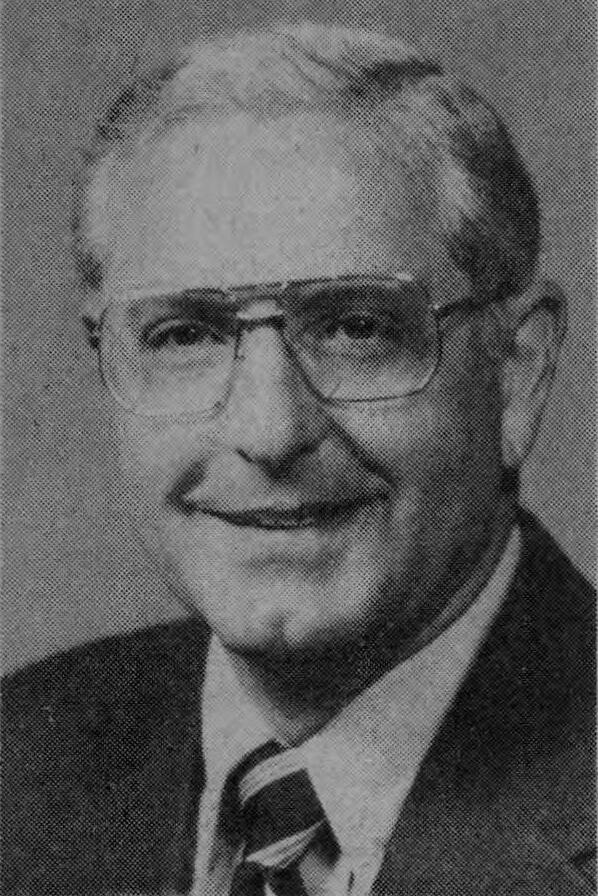

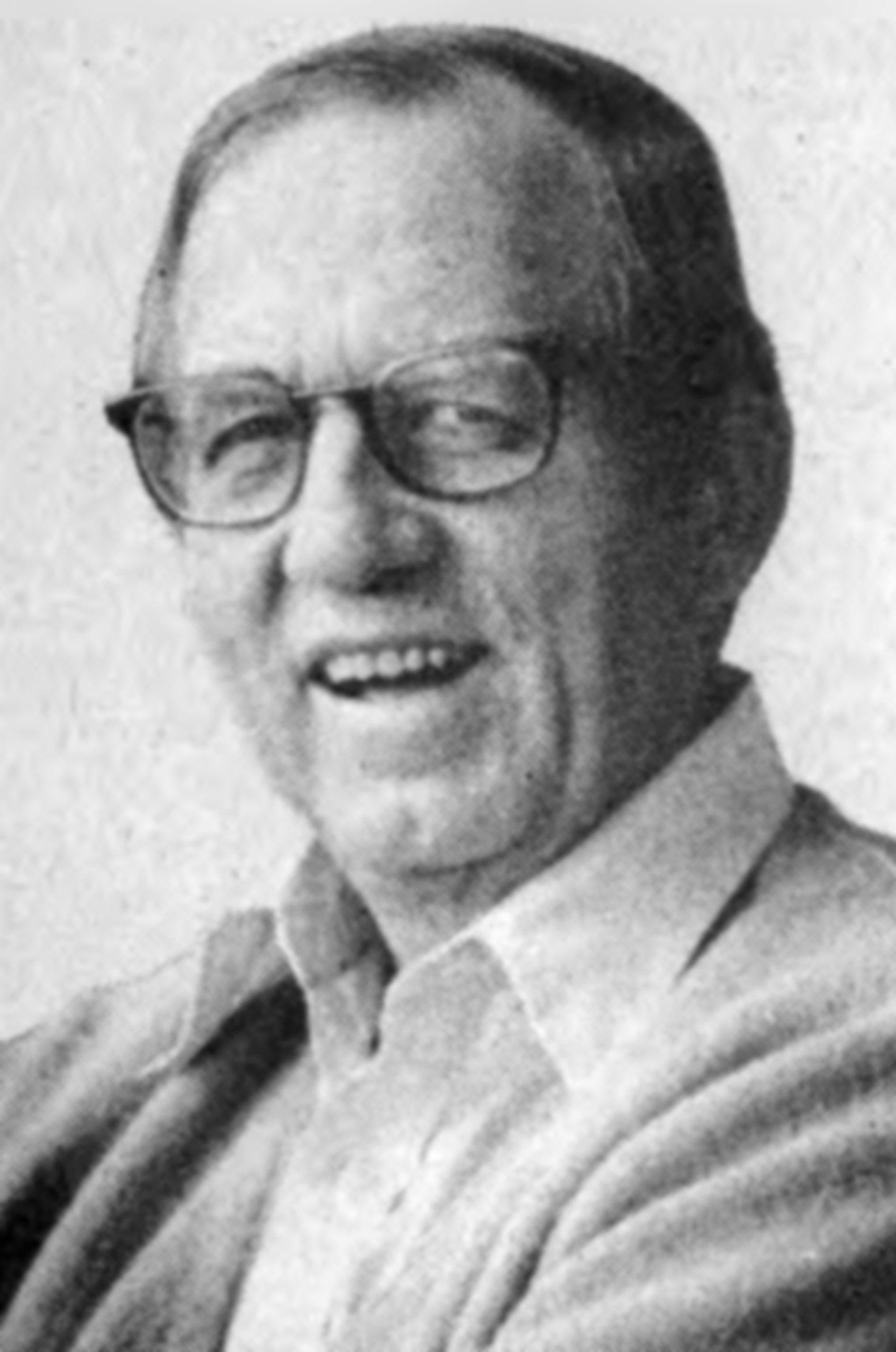
Nominee	Victor Atiyeh	Robert Straub
Party	Republican	Democratic
Popular vote	498,452	409,411
Percentage	54.71%	44.93%
- County results Atiyeh: 50–60% 60–70% 70–80% Straub: 50–60%
Governor before election
Robert Straub
Democratic
Elected Governor
Victor Atiyeh
Republican

The 1978 Oregon gubernatorial election took place on November 7, 1978. In a rematch of the 1974 contest, Republican nominee Victor Atiyeh defeated Democratic incumbent Robert Straub. As of 2026, this is the last Oregon gubernatorial race where the incumbent was defeated.

== Democratic primary ==
=== Candidates ===
==== Nominee ====
- Robert W. Straub, incumbent Governor of Oregon

==== Eliminated in primary ====
- Marvin J. Hollingsworth, former state representative (1971-1972)
- Emily Ashworth, teacher
- William L. Patrick, car salesman
- James R. Smith
- E. "Buck" Lambert, car dealer
- E. Allen Propst, retired cropduster and candidate for governor in 1970

=== Results ===
Democratic primary results
Party	Candidate	Votes	%
Democratic	Robert W. Straub (inc.)	144,761	51.71%
Democratic	Marvin J. Hollingsworth	52,901	18.90%
Democratic	Emily Ashworth	49,201	17.58%
Democratic	William L. Patrick	11,232	4.01%
Democratic	James R. Smith	8,195	2.93%
Democratic	E. "Buck" Lambert	8,005	2.86%
Democratic	E. Allen Propst	5,649	2.02%
Total votes		279,944	100.0%

== Republican primary ==
=== Candidates ===
==== Nominee ====
- Victor G. Atiyeh, state senator and nominee in 1974

==== Eliminated in primary ====
- Tom McCall, former Governor of Oregon (1967-1975)
- Roger E. Martin, state representative
- William A. Jolley, refrigeration service engineer
- L.E. "Bud" Kretsinger, tavern owner
- Gerald Wayne "Jerry" Todd
- William Desmond Hewitt, pianist and marijuana legalization advocate

=== Results ===
Republican primary results
Party	Candidate	Votes	%
Republican	Victor Atiyeh	115,593	46.42%
Republican	Tom McCall	83,568	33.56%
Republican	Roger Martin	42,644	17.13%
Republican	William A. Jolley	3,133	1.26%
Republican	L.E. "Bud" Kretsinger	2,332	0.94%
Republican	Gerald Wayne "Jerry" Todd	989	0.40%
Republican	William Desmond Hewitt	741	0.30%
Total votes		249,000	100.0%

== General election ==
=== Results ===
1978 Oregon gubernatorial election
Party	Candidate	Votes	%	±%
Republican	Victor G. Atiyeh	498,452	54.90%	+12.56%
Democratic	Robert W. Straub (inc.)	409,411	45.10%	−12.79%
Write-in	Scattering	3,280	0.36%	
Total votes		911,143	100.00%	
Majority		89,041	9.77%	
Republican gain from Democratic		Swing	+25.35%	

=== Results by county ===
Lane County backed the losing candidate for the first time since 1930 and after this election, has voted for the winner in every subsequent gubernatorial election to date (as of 2026). This was also one of only two elections in the 20th century in which the winning gubernatorial candidate did not carry Multnomah County. (Note: The other was in 1948)

County	Victor G. Atiyeh Republican		Robert W. Straub Democratic		Scattering Write-in		Margin		Total votes cast
County	#	%	#	%	#	%	#	%	Total votes cast
Baker	3,739	66.31%	1,896	33.62%	4	0.07%	1,843	32.68%	5,639
Benton	13,658	55.20%	10,985	44.40%	99	0.40%	2,673	10.80%	24,742
Clackamas	48,708	55.73%	38,349	43.88%	340	0.39%	10,359	11.85%	87,397
Clatsop	6,787	55.98%	5,311	43.81%	25	0.21%	1,476	12.18%	12,123
Columbia	6,142	48.02%	6,576	51.42%	72	0.56%	-434	-3.39%	12,790
Coos	11,597	53.80%	9,943	46.13%	15	0.07%	1,654	7.67%	21,555
Crook	2,619	58.96%	1,806	40.66%	17	0.38%	813	18.30%	4,442
Curry	4,170	67.23%	2,024	32.63%	9	0.15%	2,146	34.60%	6,203
Deschutes	11,226	57.50%	8,265	42.33%	34	0.17%	2,961	15.17%	19,525
Douglas	19,030	63.85%	10,740	36.03%	35	0.12%	8,290	27.81%	29,805
Gilliam	627	67.56%	300	32.33%	1	0.11%	327	35.24%	928
Grant	1,953	65.98%	1,004	33.92%	3	0.10%	949	32.06%	2,960
Harney	1,846	64.05%	1,029	35.70%	7	0.24%	817	28.35%	2,882
Hood River	3,246	56.83%	2,444	42.79%	22	0.39%	802	14.04%	5,712
Jackson	22,814	55.32%	18,389	44.59%	35	0.08%	4,425	10.73%	41,238
Jefferson	2,328	64.65%	1,265	35.13%	8	0.22%	1,063	29.52%	3,601
Josephine	13,515	73.27%	4,908	26.61%	22	0.12%	8,607	46.66%	18,445
Klamath	12,060	66.76%	5,985	33.13%	19	0.11%	6,075	33.63%	18,064
Lake	1,929	65.66%	1,003	34.14%	6	0.20%	926	31.52%	2,938
Lane	40,446	43.22%	52,985	56.62%	141	0.15%	-12,539	-13.40%	93,572
Lincoln	7,286	56.76%	5,531	43.09%	19	0.15%	1,755	13.67%	12,836
Linn	17,482	62.48%	10,444	37.33%	54	0.19%	7,038	25.15%	27,980
Malheur	5,546	72.55%	2,097	27.43%	1	0.01%	3,449	45.12%	7,644
Marion	41,115	59.97%	27,067	39.48%	379	0.55%	14,048	20.49%	68,561
Morrow	1,287	60.42%	839	39.39%	4	0.19%	448	21.03%	2,130
Multnomah	100,530	46.83%	112,754	52.52%	1,391	0.65%	-12,224	-5.69%	214,675
Polk	9,754	58.35%	6,899	41.27%	64	0.38%	2,855	17.08%	16,717
Sherman	627	62.45%	371	36.95%	6	0.60%	256	25.50%	1,004
Tillamook	4,488	54.26%	3,747	45.30%	36	0.44%	741	8.96%	8,271
Umatilla	9,272	61.62%	5,759	38.27%	16	0.11%	3,513	23.35%	15,047
Union	5,635	67.01%	2,763	32.86%	11	0.13%	2,872	34.15%	8,409
Wallowa	1,919	70.50%	798	29.32%	5	0.18%	1,121	41.18%	2,722
Wasco	4,742	58.82%	3,300	40.93%	20	0.25%	1,442	17.89%	8,062
Washington	49,918	59.30%	33,955	40.34%	300	0.36%	15,963	18.96%	84,173
Wheeler	357	53.68%	307	46.17%	1	0.15%	50	7.52%	665
Yamhill	10,054	56.85%	7,573	42.82%	59	0.33%	2,481	14.03%	17,686
Total	498,452	54.71%	409,411	44.93%	3,280	0.36%	89,041	9.77%	911,143

==== Counties that flipped from Democratic to Republican ====
- Baker
- Benton
- Clackamas
- Clatsop
- Coos
- Crook
- Curry
- Deschutes
- Douglas
- Grant
- Harney
- Hood River
- Jackson
- Lincoln
- Linn
- Marion
- Morrow
- Polk
- Tillamook
- Umatilla
- Wasco
- Washington
- Wheeler
- Yamhill
