= 1974 Oregon gubernatorial election =

- November 5, 1974
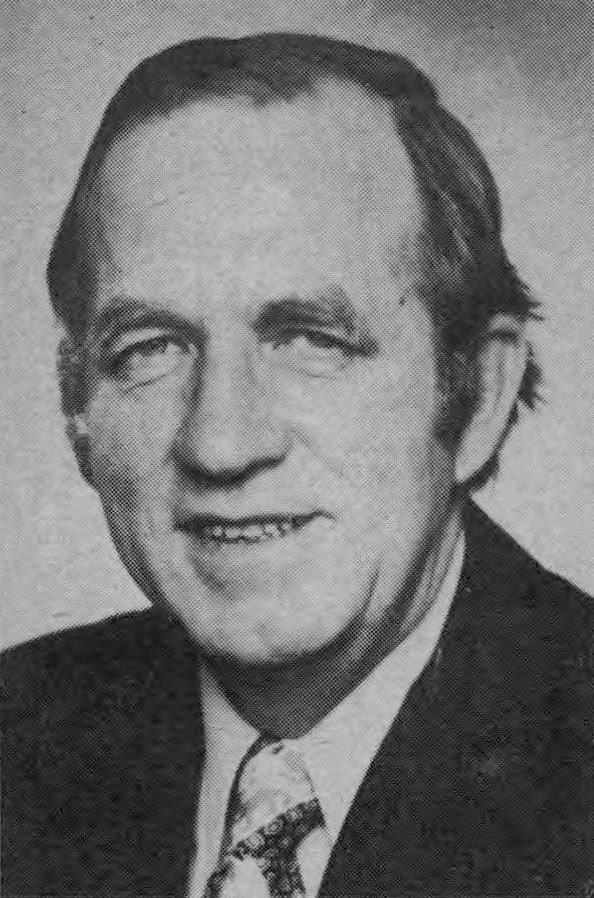

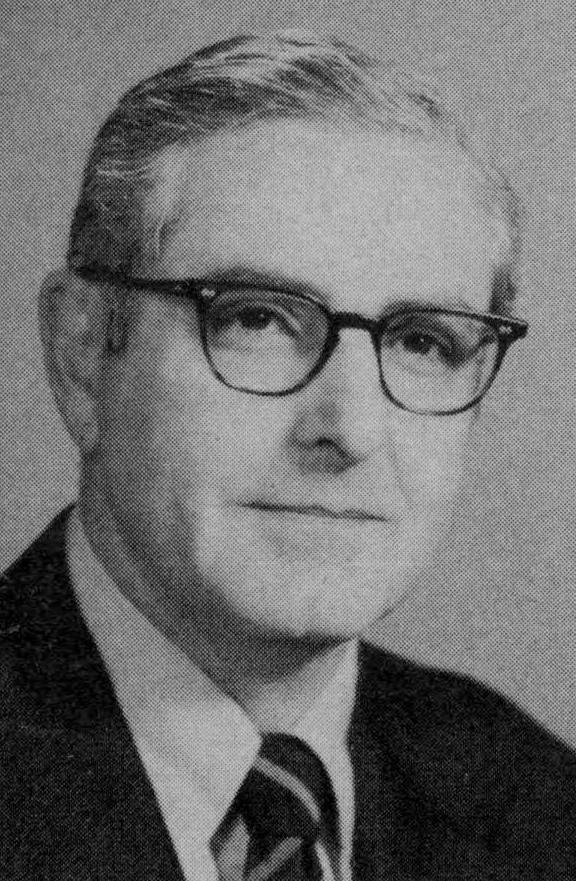
Nominee	Robert Straub	Victor Atiyeh
Party	Democratic	Republican
Popular vote	444,812	324,751
Percentage	57.72%	42.14%
- County results Straub: 50–60% 60–70% Atiyeh: 50–60% 60–70%
Governor before election
Tom McCall
Republican
Elected Governor
Robert Straub
Democratic

The 1974 Oregon gubernatorial election took place on November 5, 1974. Democratic nominee Robert Straub, endorsed by the outgoing Governor Tom McCall, defeated Republican nominee Victor Atiyeh.

== Primary election ==
Oregon held primary elections on May 28, 1974.

=== Republican party ===
==== Candidates ====
- Victor G. Atiyeh, member of Oregon State Senate
- Frank E. Heisler
- William Jolley
- Clay Myers, Oregon secretary of state
- John E. Smets

==== Results ====
Republican primary results
Party	Candidate	Votes	%
Republican	Victor G. Atiyeh	144,454	60.69%
Republican	Clay Myers	79,003	33.19%
Republican	John E. Smets	6,088	2.56%
Republican	William Jolley	4,647	1.95%
Republican	Frank E. Heisler	3,059	1.29%
Republican	Scattering	753	0.32%
Total votes		238,004	100.00%

=== Democratic party ===
Seeking the Democratic nomination for the third consecutive election, Robert W. Straub, having easily secured the two previous nominations by large margins in the primaries, this time faced a competitive three-way race against State Senator Betty Roberts and State Treasurer James A. Redden.

==== Candidates ====
- Leonard Baxter
- John Freeman
- Bill Harvey
- William L. Patrick
- E. Allen Propst
- James A. Redden, Oregon state treasurer
- Betty Roberts, member of Oregon State Senate
- Pauline F. Smith
- Robert W. Straub, former Oregon state treasurer and nominee for governor in 1966 and 1970
- Johnny Woods

==== Results ====
Democratic primary results
Party	Candidate	Votes	%
Democratic	Robert W. Straub	107,205	33.61%
Democratic	Betty Roberts	98,654	30.93%
Democratic	James A. Redden	88,795	27.84%
Democratic	Johnny Woods	4,936	1.55%
Democratic	John Freeman	4,693	1.47%
Democratic	William L. Patrick	4,475	1.40%
Democratic	Bill Harvey	3,014	0.94%
Democratic	E. Allen Propst	2,983	0.94%
Democratic	Pauline F. Smith	1,950	0.61%
Democratic	Leonard Baxter	1,702	0.53%
Democratic	Scattering	589	0.18%
Total votes		318,996	100.00%

== General election ==
=== Results ===
1974 Oregon gubernatorial election
Party	Candidate	Votes	%	±%
Democratic	Robert W. Straub	444,812	57.73%	+13.62%
Republican	Victor G. Atiyeh	324,751	42.14%	−13.37%
Write-in	Scattering	1,011	0.13%	
Total votes		770,574	100.00%	
Majority		120,061	15.58%	
Democratic gain from Republican		Swing	+27.00%	

=== Results by county ===
Straub's sweeping victory broke numerous long streaks of Republican dominance in counties across the state. The longest such streak belonged to Marion County, Washington County, and Yamhill County, all three of which had not voted Democratic in a gubernatorial election since 1922. Straub was also the first Democrat to be elected governor without carrying Union County.

County	Robert W. Straub Democratic		Victor G. Atiyeh Republican		Scattering Write-in		Margin		Total votes cast
County	#	%	#	%	#	%	#	%	Total votes cast
Baker	2,763	51.83%	2,568	48.17%	0	0.00%	195	3.66%	5,331
Benton	12,229	58.95%	8,465	40.81%	51	0.25%	3,764	18.14%	20,745
Clackamas	39,365	58.40%	2,7948	41.50%	67	0.10%	11,387	16.89%	67,410
Clatsop	5,707	55.06%	4,644	44.80%	14	0.14%	1,063	10.26%	10,365
Columbia	7,080	65.13%	3,777	34.75%	13	0.12%	3,303	30.39%	10,870
Coos	12,176	65.59%	6,380	34.37%	8	0.04%	5,796	31.22%	18,564
Crook	2,107	55.23%	1,703	44.64%	5	0.13%	404	10.59%	3,815
Curry	2,895	55.83%	2,284	44.05%	6	0.12%	611	11.78%	5,185
Deschutes	7,318	54.14%	6,188	45.78%	11	0.08%	1,130	8.36%	13,517
Douglas	12,339	52.43%	11,186	47.53%	8	0.03%	1,153	4.90%	23,533
Gilliam	490	48.18%	527	51.82%	0	0.00%	-37	-3.64%	1,017
Grant	1,288	53.11%	1,137	46.89%	0	0.00%	151	6.23%	2,425
Harney	1,314	52.52%	1,186	47.40%	2	0.08%	128	5.12%	2,502
Hood River	2,640	55.40%	2,123	44.55%	2	0.04%	517	10.85%	4,765
Jackson	17,626	54.25%	14,841	45.68%	21	0.06%	2,785	8.57%	32,488
Jefferson	1,360	49.47%	1,385	50.38%	4	0.15%	-25	-0.91%	2,749
Josephine	6,385	45.78%	7,556	54.17%	7	0.05%	-1,171	-8.40%	13,948
Klamath	7,477	48.23%	8,020	51.74%	5	0.03%	-543	-3.50%	15,502
Lake	1,025	47.17%	1,146	52.74%	2	0.09%	-121	-5.57%	2,173
Lane	49,672	61.63%	30,762	38.17%	165	0.20%	18,910	23.46%	80,599
Lincoln	6,468	56.96%	4,884	43.01%	4	0.04%	1,584	13.95%	11,356
Linn	12,680	56.26%	9,842	43.67%	15	0.07%	2,838	12.59%	22,537
Malheur	2,526	37.83%	4,148	62.12%	3	0.04%	-1,622	-24.29%	6,677
Marion	29,448	54.39%	24,606	45.45%	85	0.16%	4,842	8.94%	54,139
Morrow	842	51.37%	796	48.57%	1	0.06%	46	2.81%	1,639
Multnomah	131,163	63.71%	74,320	36.10%	406	0.20%	56,843	27.61%	205,889
Polk	6,979	55.04%	5,685	44.84%	15	0.12%	1,294	10.21%	12,679
Sherman	430	46.44%	496	53.56%	0	0.00%	-66	-7.13%	926
Tillamook	3,426	50.48%	3,354	49.42%	7	0.10%	72	1.06%	6,787
Umatilla	6,884	51.13%	6,572	48.81%	9	0.07%	312	2.32%	13,465
Union	3,420	46.84%	3,882	53.16%	0	0.00%	-462	-6.33%	7,302
Wallowa	1,127	48.85%	1,180	51.15%	0	0.00%	-53	-2.30%	2,307
Wasco	3,857	58.10%	2,781	41.89%	1	0.02%	1,076	16.21%	6,639
Washington	34,160	51.92%	31,572	47.98%	67	0.10%	2,588	3.93%	65,799
Wheeler	417	58.16%	299	41.70%	1	0.14%	118	16.46%	717
Yamhill	7,729	54.38%	6,478	45.58%	6	0.04%	1,251	8.80%	14,213
Total	444,812	57.72%	324,751	42.14%	1,011	0.13%	120,061	15.58%	770,574

==== Counties that flipped from Republican to Democratic ====
- Benton
- Clackamas
- Clatsop
- Crook
- Curry
- Deschutes
- Harney
- Hood River
- Jackson
- Lane
- Lincoln
- Marion
- Multnomah
- Polk
- Tillamook
- Umatilla
- Wasco
- Washington
- Yamhill

==== Counties that flipped from Democratic to Republican ====
- Gilliam
- Klamath
- Lake
- Union
