= Roger E. Martin =

American politician (1935–2023)

Roger Martin

Member of the Oregon House of Representatives from the 7th and 24th district
- In office 1967–1978
- Preceded by: Beulah J. Hand
- Succeeded by: Joyce E. Cohen

Personal details
- Born: March 10, 1935 Portland, Oregon, U.S.
- Died: June 25, 2023 (aged 88) Portland, Oregon, U.S.
- Party: Republican
- Occupation: Businessman

Roger Edward Martin (March 10, 1935 – June 25, 2023) was an American businessman, state legislator, and lobbyist from Oregon. He was an electric equipment sales executive with Martin Electric and served six terms in the Oregon House of Representatives. In 1978, Martin ran for governor of Oregon, but lost to Victor Atiyeh in the Republican primary. Following the 1978 election, Martin became a lobbyist at the Oregon State Capitol.

== Early life ==
Roger Edward Martin was born in Portland, Oregon on March 10, 1935, the son of Ray and Georgiana Martin. He grew up in Portland and he graduated from Central Catholic High School in 1953. He went on to attend the University of Oregon, receiving a bachelor's degree in history in 1957.

After college, he served in the United States Army from 1957 to 1958 and Army Reserve from 1958 to 1963, where he became a captain. Martin then went to work for Martin Electric, an electrical supply company owned by his family. He was also a partner in United Sales Associates. He was active in the Lake Oswego Rotary Club and the local Toastmasters group. In the early 1960s, he was a member of the citizen group that advised the Portland area Metropolitan Transportation Study Committee.

== Political career ==
In 1962, Martin ran as a Republican for a seat in the Oregon House of Representatives. He ran in District 7, one of four seats that represented Clackamas County. He got 9,722 votes, but lost to the incumbent Democrat. Martin ran again in 1964. This time he got over 26,000 votes, but was still unable the unseat the incumbent. That same year, Martin was appointed chairman of a volunteer committee chartered to reform Lake Oswego's city government. The result of that effort was the creation a city manager position to oversee the city's day-to-day business.

Martin ran a third time for the District 7 House seat in 1966. This time, his campaign was helped by a strong personal endorsement from Tom McCall, Oregon's popular Secretary of State and future governor. Martin easily defeated his Democratic opponent in the general election, receiving 59 percent of the votes cast in District 7. He took his seat in the state legislature in January 1967. Martin was active in the 1967 legislative session which lasted from 11 January until 14 June. He served on the elections, local government, and fish and game committees. He also served on the tax committee during a special legislative session held in November 1967.

Martin was easily re-elected to his District 7 seat in 1968 and 1970. The Republicans enjoyed a majority in the House during both sessions. Martin's Republican colleagues selected him to serve as Speaker Pro Tempore during the 1971 legislative session.

After the 1971 legislative session, the Oregon House of Representative was re-districted and Martin's home in Lake Oswego became part of District 24. The new district represented much of the area previously covered by District 7. In 1972, he ran for the House seat in District 24, winning with 55 percent of the district's vote. Following his election, he served in the regular legislature session from January through July 1973 and then a special legislative session from mid-January through mid-February 1974.

Martin was re-elected to his District 24 seat two more times, in 1974 and 1976. This allowed him to serve in the legislature's regular sessions in 1975 and 1977 plus two special sessions, one in December 1975 and the other in September 1978. During this period, Martin's Republican colleagues in the state House of Representatives elected him as their leader. Because Democrats held the majority of seats in House, he served as the House minority leader for four years.

During the stormy 1977 legislative session, Martin helped build a coalition of Republicans and moderate and conservative Democrats that ultimately stripped the Democratic speaker, Philip D. Lang, of his power. At the beginning of the session, Martin encouraged his Republicans colleagues to vote for conservative Democrat, Dick Magruder, for speaker. As a result, Magruder came within one vote of being elected speaker. While unsuccessful, that effort encouraged further cooperation between the Republican minority and conservative Democrats in the House. The influence of this coalition continued to grow throughout the legislative session. In May 1977, a small group of moderate Democrats joined the coalition. In a quick legislative move, the expanded coalition voted to transfer the speaker's power to the House Rules Committee which was controlled by the coalition leaders. While the speaker was not removed from office, the Rules Committee took control of virtually every aspect of House operations. As a member of the Rules Committee, Martin helped set the legislative agenda for the remainder of the 1977 session.

In 1978, Martin decided not to run for another term in the Oregon House of Representative. Instead, he ran for governor. He faced former governor Tom McCall and state senator Victor Atiyeh in the Republican primary. In his campaign, Martin highlighted his business background and experience as a leader in the state legislature. He emphasized his ability to craft common sense solutions for improving the efficiency and effectiveness of state government without raising taxes. Here is what Martin said in the primary election voters' pamphlet:

Oregonians are independent and hard working. They expect a fair shake and I think it's time Oregon's government respect that fact. The first step is new leadership. I believe I have the experience, youth, and energy to provide that leadership.

In the May 1978 primary election, 42,644 Republicans voted for Martin. That was 17 percent of the ballots cast in the Republican primary. He finished third behind Atiyeh (who got with 46 percent of the vote) and McCall (who got 33 percent). Atiyeh went on to defeat incumbent governor Robert W. Straub in the general election in November 1978.

== Lobbyist ==
After leaving the legislature, Martin became a lobbyist at the Oregon State Capitol. He founded Roger E. Martin and Associates in 1978, a public relations and lobbying firm. By 1979, Martin's clients included the Oregon Transportation Association, United Grocers, Oregon World Trade Council, Hood River Distillers, Chemical Specialties Manufactures Association, Oregon Library Association, and the Oregon Catholic Conference. In 1981, Oregon's state circuit judges hired Martin to represent them at the state capitol.

As a lobbyist, Martin was particularly active in advocating issues for retail grocers and transportation interest groups. Over the years, he was also engaged in lobbying for several public policy issues. In 1984, he led a campaign to get a sales tax initiative on the state ballot. Two years later, he headed an effort to defeat an initiative to legalize marijuana in Oregon. Between 2001 and 2006, he joined Democratic congressman Earl Blumenauer and other former state legislators to oppose legislative term limits.

For more than three decades, Martin had been an active lobbyist. In 2009, his client list included the City of Lake Oswego, Oregon Transit Association, Alaska Airlines, Union Pacific Railroad, Oregon Amusement and Music Operators Association, Williams Companies, WOW Energies, Oregon Golf Association, and the Oregon Catholic Conference. As of 2014, Martin was still representing the Oregon Catholic Conference, Oregon Amusement and Music Operators Association, Oregon Golf Association, and Williams Company as a lobbyist.

== Death ==
Martin died of cancer in Portland, Oregon on June 25, 2023, at the age of 88. There was a memorial Mass for Martin July 14 at Our Lady of the Lake Catholic Church in Lake Oswego.

== Legacy ==
As a former state legislator, many public documents with information about Martin's legislative career are maintained by the Oregon State Archives. Martin's personal papers and other private documents are now part of the Oregon Historical Society research library collection in Portland, Oregon. The historic records cover the period 1950 through 1987, with much of the documentation coming from the 1960s and 1970s when Martin was serving in the Oregon State Legislature.
