= Pat Keefe =

American football coach

Biographical details
- Born: September 16, 1878; Shelburne Falls, Massachusetts, U.S.
- Died: September 10, 1941 (aged 62); Chelsea, Massachusetts, U.S.

Playing career

Baseball
- 1901: Canton (Northern NY League)
- 1902: Utica Pent-Ups
- 1902: Potsdam (Northern NY League)
- 1902: Plattsburgh (Northern NY League)
- 1903: Ilion Typewriters
- 1903: Burlington (Northern NY League)
- 1905: Bradford Drillers
- 1914: Bradford Drillers

Coaching career (HC unless noted)

Football
- ?: Williamstown HS (MA)
- 1909: Ogdensburg HS (NY)
- 1910–1912: Middlebury
- c. 1924–1927: Williams (assistant)

Baseball
- 1910: Maine
- 1929: Clarkson

Administrative career (AD unless noted)
- 1915–1917: Drury HS (MA)

Head coaching record
- Overall: 2–16–2 (college football)

Patrick "Patsy" Keefe (September 16, 1878 – September 10, 1941) was an American baseball player, coach of football and baseball, and athletics administrator. He served as the head football coach at Middlebury College in Middlebury, Vermont from 1910 to 1912, compiling a record of 2–16–2. Keefe was also the head baseball coach at the University of Maine, tallying a mark of 8–4.

Keefe played high school football in Williamstown, Massachusetts as a halfback. He later coached football for two seasons there and then in Ogdensburg, New York, in 1909. He was the athletic director at Drury High School in North Adams, Massachusetts from 1915 to 1917. Keefe was later an assistant football coach at Williams College under head coaches Percy Wendell and Douglas Lawson. In 1929, he was hired as the baseball coach at Clarkson College—now known as Clarkson University—in Potsdam, New York. He died on September 10, 1941, at Veteran's Hospital in Chelsea, Massachusetts.

== Head coaching record ==
Year	Team	Overall	Conference	Standing	Bowl/playoffs
Middlebury (Independent) (1910–1912)
1910	Middlebury	0–5–1			
1911	Middlebury	0–5–1			
1912	Middlebury	2–6			
Middlebury:		2–16–2			
Total:		2–16–2			
