= Dorothy Lawson McCall =

American author, socialite, rancher (1888 to 1982)

- Born: October 11, 1888
- Died: April 2, 1982 (aged 93); Portland, Oregon
- Children: 5, including Tom McCall
- Father: Thomas Lawson

Dorothy Lawson McCall (October 11, 1888 – April 2, 1982) was an American author, socialite, prominent rancher, humanitarian, and mother of Oregon Governor Tom McCall. She was well known in both her home state of Massachusetts and her adopted state of Oregon, where she lived most of her adult life.

== Early life ==
Dorothy Lawson McCall was the daughter of Thomas Lawson and Jeannie Goodwillie Lawson. Her father was a wealthy businessman; he was known at the time as the "Copper King" for the wealth he’d amassed due to copper mining stocks. McCall was the fourth of six children the couple had. She was raised in Winchester and Boston, Massachusetts, but spent the summers in Duxbury on Cape Cod. During her childhood, her father built a lavish estate he named Dreamwold in Scituate, Massachusetts, where he bred horses and bulldogs. Her mother died when she was 17.

Due to her father's wealth, McCall was considered a debutante and her activities were often covered in local newspapers. Her family had been friends with the family of Samuel W. McCall, a Massachusetts politician. As a girl, Dorothy was friends with McCall's daughter Katherine, and when she was 15, she reconnected with McCall's son Henry, known as Hal. Hal and Dorothy dated while Hal attended Harvard University, where he played baseball. Dorothy took courses in French literature and language at the Sorbonne in Paris.

The pair married on December 15, 1910, at the Dreamwold estate. Hal McCall had visited a friend in Portland, Oregon, after he graduated from Harvard, and had liked the area so much he had secured a job there. Dorothy agreed to move to Oregon on a trial basis after they were married. She had never been further west than New York City before taking the train to Oregon.

== Life in Oregon ==
In the summer of 1911 her father and sister, Bunny, came to visit them in Oregon. The family took a trip to Central Oregon, where Thomas Lawson was struck by the ranch life. While he had deeded acreage from his Dreamwold estate to his other children upon their marriages, he bought 640 acres along the Crooked River as a wedding gift for the McCalls. They built an estate there named Westernwold.

The McCalls, with assistance from Thomas Lawson, began a variety of ranching activities on the land, including pigs, cattle, and chickens, among others. Dorothy Lawson McCall took primary responsibility for the chickens.

She had five children: Henry Jr. (known as Harry), Tom, Dorothy (known as "Bebs"), and twins, Sam and Jean. All five were born in Massachusetts at Dreamwold, but raised in Oregon at Westernwold.

The Westernwold ranch was well-known and discussed among the community in central Oregon. Their exploits were often covered in local newspapers, and she was also referenced in relation to her father in the New York Times.

The McCalls struggled financially during the 1920s, which led to them selling and pawning some possessions.

Hal died in 1947, but Dorothy continued to live at the ranch for many years. Later, she rented the property before selling it in 1983.

== Political career ==
McCall was a Republican, and remained involved enough in public life to have spoken to President Lyndon B. Johnson by telephone in 1967, when she praised his position on the Vietnam War.

After she moved to Portland later in life, she was described in a 1981 book as "a celebrated Portland ‘character’".

Hal and Dorothy's second son, Tom, was elected the Republican governor of Oregon in 1966. An "iconic" and "influential" governor, Tom McCall is remembered for his environmental policies, especially the beach bill (which made Oregon's coastline public), and the bottle bill (the first bottle deposit bill in the U.S.). Another biographer described her as a "the eccentric mother of Governor McCall."

Due to term limits, Tom McCall could not run for governor for a third time. Instead, Dorothy Lawson McCall announced her own run for the Republican nomination for governor in 1974, when she was 85 years old. She promised to continue most of his work, including supporting his environmental positions. She abandoned her run, however, saying "I did not want to get into the muck of politics".

During her brief candidacy, Tom McCall was busy creating what he called a "Third Force" centrist platform that would counter the excesses of both the Democratic and Republic parties, including toying with the idea of running for president. CBS News’s "60 Minutes" sent a crew to do a story around this, in which Dorothy Lawson McCall was interviewed. According to Tom McCall of his mother's interview with Mike Wallace, "she rose to the occasion and staged a lively battle of wits with the vaunted griller, Wallace himself."

== Writing career ==
Dorothy Lawson McCall was also a published author, writing two books. "Ranch Under the Rimrock", which covers her life at Westwold, was published in 1968. "The Copper King’s Daughter", which covers her childhood, was published in 1972. She wrote for more than 40 years, and had numerous rejections before her works were published.

== Death ==
McCall died at age 93 in her home in Portland. Her papers are available in the Oregon Historical Society Research Library.
