= Thomas W. Lawson (businessman) =

American writer and businessman

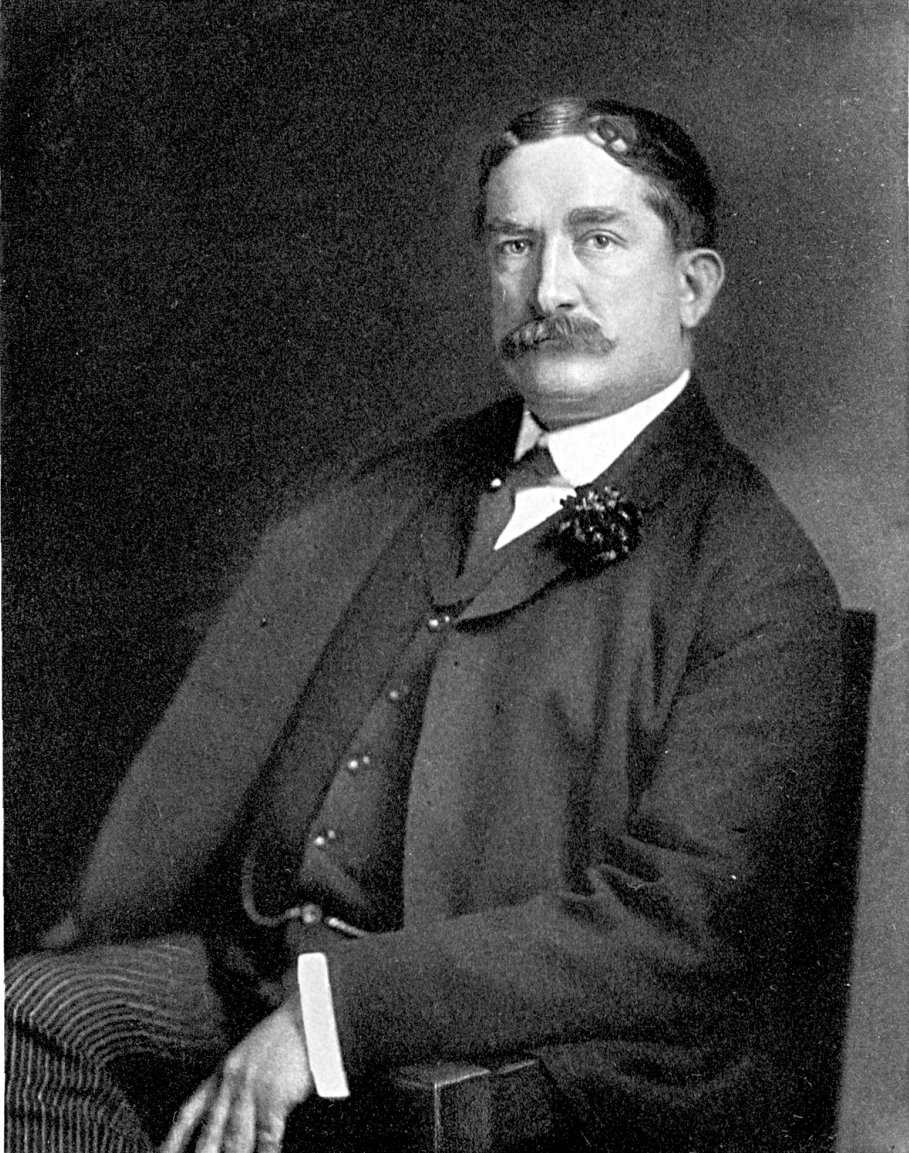
- Born: Thomas William Lawson; February 26, 1857; Charlestown, Massachusetts, U.S.
- Died: February 7, 1925 (aged 67); Boston, Massachusetts, U.S.
- Spouse: Jeannie Augusta Goodwillie (m. 1878; died 1906)
- Children: 6; including Douglas
- Relatives: Tom McCall (grandson)

Thomas William Lawson (February 26, 1857 – February 7, 1925) was an American businessman and writer. A highly controversial Boston stock promoter, he is known for both his efforts to promote reforms in the stock markets and the fortune he amassed for himself through highly dubious stock manipulations.

== Early life ==
Thomas William Lawson was born February 26, 1857, at Charlestown, Massachusetts, to Thomas and Anna Maria (née Loring) Lawson. Lawson's father, a carpenter, died when he was eight years old.

== Career ==
At 12 years old, Lawson ran away from home to become a clerk in a Boston bank and soon began speculating in stocks. Lawson specialized in shares of copper-mining companies, which were then a staple of the Boston stock market, and became a multimillionaire during the copper boom of the late 1890s. He was a principal mover in the promotion of companies trying to establish the small town of Grand Rivers, Kentucky, as a major steel-producing city. He built the lavish estate called Dreamworld in Scituate, Massachusetts, at a cost of $6,000,000. Lawson was an independent candidate for the United States Senate in 1918. He finished a distant third with 5.26% of the vote.

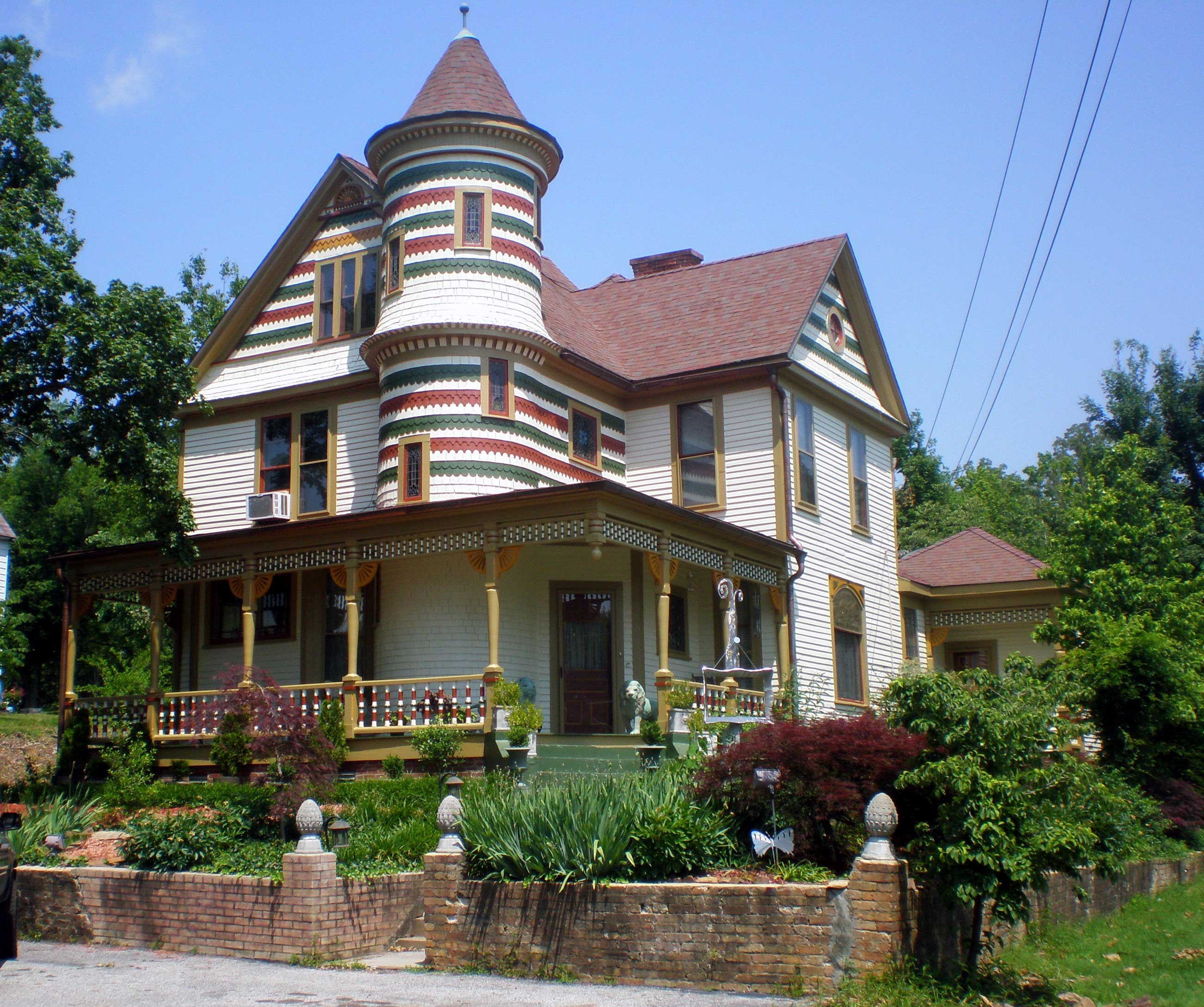
Boston financier Thomas Lawson's residence in Grand Rivers, Kentucky. He promoted the town as the next great steel-making center to rival Pittsburgh and Birmingham.

In 1899, he joined Henry H. Rogers and William Rockefeller in forming Amalgamated Copper Mining Company, a company that combined several copper mining companies, mostly in Butte, Montana, and which tried to dominate the copper market. Amalgamated Copper was criticized for years afterward. It became Anaconda Copper Mining Company in 1915. Lawson broke with the financial backers of Amalgamated and became an advocate for financial reform.

== Death ==
Lawson died of diabetes on February 7, 1925, in Boston; and was buried beside his wife.

== Personal life ==
Lawson married Jeannie Augusta Goodwillie (1857–1906) in 1878, and they had six children: Gladys, Dorothy, Arnold Lawson, Marian, Douglas and Jean.

=== Legacy and honors ===
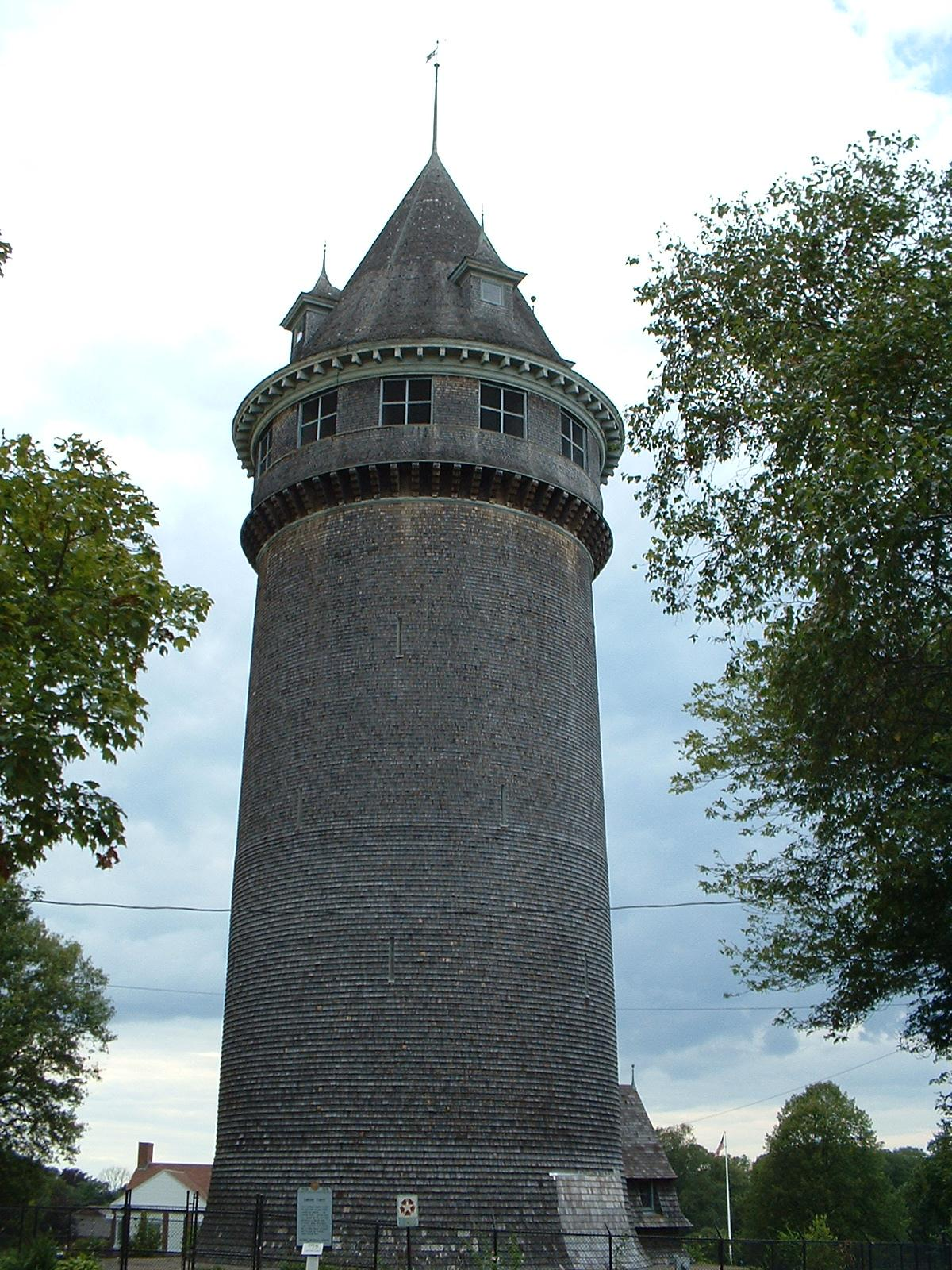
The Lawson Tower, Scituate, Massachusetts. The tower was part of Lawson's Dreamwold estate.

The Thomas W. Lawson, the only seven-masted schooner ever built, was named after him. Lawson, who was intensely superstitious, wrote the novel Friday the Thirteenth in which a broker picks that day on which to bring down Wall Street; the Thomas W. Lawson, in which he had invested heavily, was wrecked off the Isles of Scilly at 2:30 am GMT on Saturday December 14, 1907, but to Lawson, at home in Boston, it was at that time still Friday the 13th.

He is generally credited in the U.S. with the Lawson sofa, made for him at the turn of the 20th century. It was a square, overstuffed sofa on a generous scale with loose seat cushions and pillows.

The Lawson Tower, originally part of his private Dreamworld estate, still stands. The structure is a water tower with a shingled outer shell and observatory which offers views of the area from an observation deck.

== Works ==
- The Krank: His Language and What it Means (1888) a glossary of baseball expressions
- History of the Republican Party
- The Lawson History of the America's Cup (1902), with Winfield M. Thompson
- Frenzied Finance, the Crime of Amalgamated (1906), his controversial and sensationally successful account of the formation of the Amalgamated Copper Company (Anaconda Copper).
- Friday the Thirteenth (1907): an attack on the American stock market.
- The Remedy (1912)
- The High Cost of Living (1913)
- The Leak (1919)

== Bibliography ==
- Frenzied Finance: the Crime of Amalgamated
