= Howell Appling Jr. =

American politician and businessman

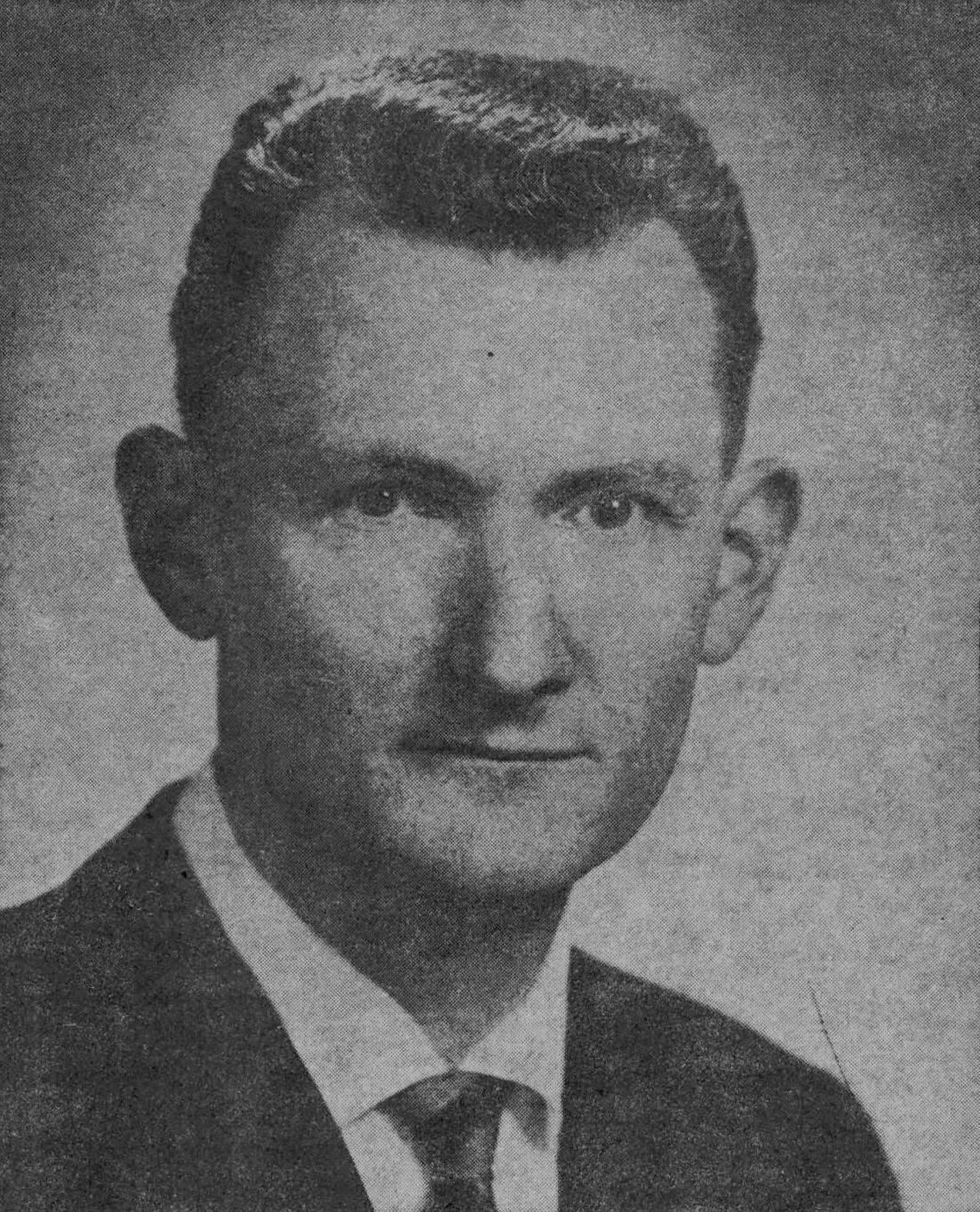
- Appling in 1960

Secretary of State of Oregon
- In office January 12, 1959 – January 4, 1965
- Preceded by: Mark Hatfield
- Succeeded by: Tom McCall

Personal details
- Born: September 5, 1919 Carthage, Texas, US
- Died: October 16, 2002 (aged 83)
- Party: Republican
- Occupation: Politician; Businessman

Howell Appling Jr. (September 5, 1919 – October 16, 2002) was an American Republican politician and businessman in Oregon, U.S.

== Biography ==
Appling was born in 1919 in Carthage, Texas. His father was Howell Appling Sr. He received a degree in engineering from Rice University in 1941 before joining the U.S. Navy during World War II, where he rose to the rank of lieutenant. In 1946, after completing his military service, Appling founded Independent Distributors, a Portland wholesale logging and farm equipment firm.

Appling served as the Multnomah County chairman of Mark Hatfield's successful 1958 bid for governor. After the election, Appling was appointed Secretary of State by Hatfield, who preceded him in that office.

Appling was elected to a full term in 1960 (defeating Monroe Sweetland) but declined to seek re-election in 1964. He was succeeded by Tom McCall in January 1965.

Appling served as the Oregon chairman of the Oregon presidential campaigns of Barry Goldwater in 1964, and Richard Nixon in 1968.

He continued as a prominent Portland businessman until his death on October 16, 2002.

Political offices
| Preceded by Mark Hatfield | Secretary of State of Oregon; 1959 – 1965 | Succeeded by Tom McCall |
