= Douglas Lawson =

American football player and coach (1890–1969)

Biographical details
- Born: June 21, 1890; Winchester, Massachusetts, U.S.
- Died: January 13, 1969 (aged 78); Boston, Massachusetts, U.S.

Playing career
- 1912: Harvard
- Position: Tackle

Coaching career (HC unless noted)
- 1921–1922: Williams (line)
- 1923–1924: Columbia (line)
- 1925–1927: Williams
- 1928: Brown (line)

Head coaching record
- Overall: 8–12–4

Douglas Lawson (June 21, 1890 – January 12, 1969) was an American football player and coach. He was the head football coach at Williams College from 1925 to 1927. He also served as an assistant football coach at Columbia University and Brown University.

== Biography ==
Lawson was born on June 21, 1890, in Winchester, Massachusetts. He attended St. Paul's School in Concord, New Hampshire. His father, Thomas W. Lawson, was a well-known Boston financier.

Lawson played tackle on the undefeated 1912 Harvard Crimson football team. After graduating, he worked in a warehouse in Washington, was a cowboy in Oregon, was a bookkeeper in Michigan, and served in the United States Army.

Lawson began his coaching career as an assistant under Percy Wendell at Williams. In 1923, he joined the coaching staff of his former Harvard coach, Percy Haughton, at Columbia. On December 9, 1924, he was chosen to succeed Wendell as the head coach at Williams. He left after three seasons to become the line coach at Brown.

After leaving football, Lawson worked in the insurance business. He owned the Lawson Agency for the Travelers Insurance Company. From 1933 to 1934, he was partners with John A. Sargent and James Roosevelt. He was also a conservative activist who supported Joseph McCarthy, was an associate of Robert W. Welch Jr. until he accused Dwight D. Eisenhower of being a communist, and invited Douglas MacArthur to speak in Boston the day after he was relieved of his commands by President Harry S. Truman.

Lawson died on January 12, 1969 at New England Deaconess Hospital. He was survived by his wife and two sisters. One of his nephews, Tom McCall, was the Governor of Oregon.

== Head coaching record ==
Year	Team	Overall	Conference	Standing	Bowl/playoffs
Williams Ephs (Independent) (1925–1927)
1925	Williams	1–4–3			
1926	Williams	3–5			
1927	Williams	4–3–1			
Williams:		8–12–4			
Total:		8–12–4			
