= SOLVE =

American environmental organization

- Formation: 1969; 57 years ago
- Type: Nonprofit
- Tax ID no.: 93-0579286
- Legal status: 501(c)(3)
- Headquarters: Portland, Oregon
- Board Chair: Doug Morris
- Chief Executive Officer: Kris Carico
- Website: https://www.solveoregon.org/
- Formerly called: SOLV; Sustaining Oregon's Legacy by Volunteering; Stop Oregon Litter and Vandalism

SOLVE (formerly SOLV, Sustaining Oregon's Legacy by Volunteering, originally an acronym for Stop Oregon Litter and Vandalism) is an environmental non-profit organization working throughout the U.S. state of Oregon. The group is based in Portland.

== History ==
SOLVE was founded in 1969 by Oregon Governor Tom McCall with the goal of reducing and cleaning up litter and vandalism throughout Oregon. In 1976, SOLVE hired Blanche Schroeder, Portland Chamber of Commerce lobbyist, to act as Executive Director of SOLVE on a part-time basis. The first statewide citizen volunteer Beach Cleanup in the nation was organized by SOLVE in 1984. Since then, annual beach cleanups have spread to every state in the U.S., all U.S. territories, and more than 100 countries around the world.

Jack McGowan became the director of the group in 1990, and continued as its leader until 2008. Over time, SOLVE has expanded its work to include education efforts, removal of invasive species, and planting of native species. In April 2008, Dianna Smiley took over as director after McGowan retired, and she was replaced in January 2010 by Melissa McDonald. The current Chief Executive Officer is Kris Carico. As of 2019, the organization had a $1.5 million budget.
