= Victor Atiyeh =

American politician (1923–2014)

Vic Atiyeh
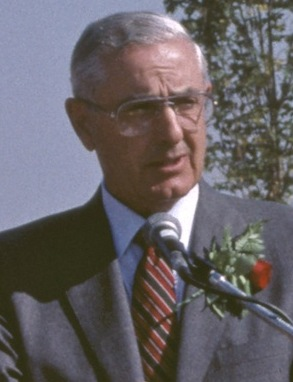
- Atiyeh in 1986

32nd Governor of Oregon
- In office January 8, 1979 – January 12, 1987
- Preceded by: Bob Straub
- Succeeded by: Neil Goldschmidt

Member of the Oregon State Senate from the 9th district
- In office January 1965 – January 8, 1979

Member of the Oregon House of Representatives from Washington County
- In office January 1959 – January 1965

Personal details
- Born: Victor George Atiyeh; February 20, 1923 Portland, Oregon, U.S.
- Died: July 20, 2014 (aged 91) West Haven-Sylvan, Oregon, U.S.
- Resting place: River View Cemetery
- Party: Republican
- Spouse: Dolores Hewitt (m. 1944)
- Children: 2
- Education: University of Oregon (attended)

Victor George Atiyeh (/əˈtiːjə/; February 20, 1923 – July 20, 2014) was an American politician who served as the 32nd governor of Oregon from 1979 to 1987. He was also the first elected governor of Middle Eastern descent and of Syrian and Lebanese descent in the United States.

Atiyeh was elected in 1978, defeating incumbent Democratic governor Robert W. Straub. He was re-elected against future governor Ted Kulongoski with 61.6% of the vote in 1982, the largest margin in 32 years. Prior to being elected governor, Atiyeh had served continuously in the Oregon legislature since 1959, initially in the House and later in the Senate.

As of 2026, Atiyeh is the most recent Republican to have held the office of Governor of Oregon to date. During his tenure as governor, he most notably faced the 1980s recession, the eruption of Mt. St. Helens in 1980, and the Rajneesh crisis from 1981-1985.

== Early life ==
Atiyeh's parents, George Atiyeh and Linda Asly, immigrated to the United States from Amar al-Husn, Syria, and Beirut, Lebanon, respectively. Atiyeh's father came through Ellis Island in 1898 to join his brother Aziz's carpet business. Atiyeh's mother's family belonged to the Antiochian Orthodox Church though Atiyeh would join the Episcopal Church later in life.

Atiyeh grew up in Portland, Oregon, attending Holladay Grade School and Washington High School. He spent two years at the University of Oregon in Eugene, where he played guard for the Oregon Ducks football program and became a regional leader in the Boy Scouts of America. When his father died, Atiyeh dropped out of college and took over his family's rug and carpet business, Atiyeh Brothers.

== Career ==
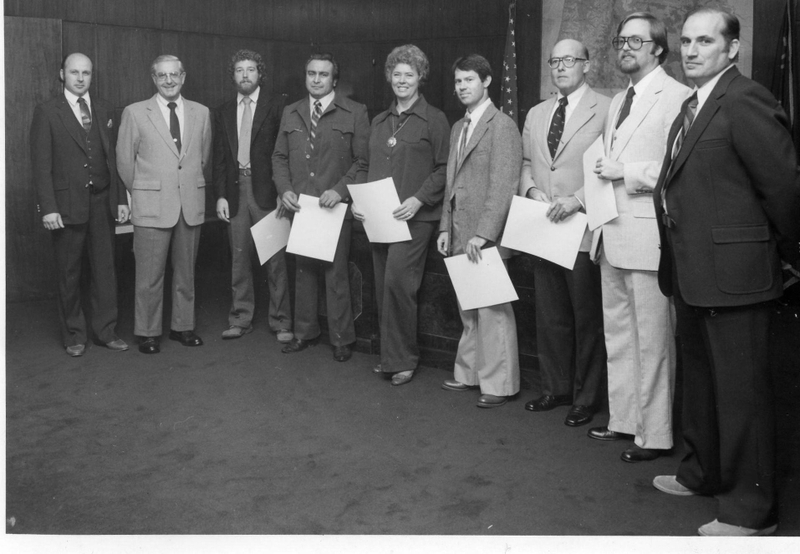
Governor Atiyeh (2nd from left) meeting with delegation in Oregon State Capitol, 1980

Atiyeh served as a member of the Oregon House of Representatives for Washington County from 1959 to 1964 and in the Oregon State Senate for the 9th district from 1965 to 1978.

=== Governor of Oregon ===
In 1974, Atiyeh ran for governor and lost to Democrat Robert W. Straub. After defeating former governor Tom McCall in the primary, Atiyeh ran against Straub again in the 1978 election, but won this time with 55 percent of the vote. He was the first Arab American to be elected as a U.S. governor.

In 1982, Atiyeh won re-election to a second four-year term, winning 61.4% of the vote over Democrat Ted Kulongoski - the largest victory margin in 32 years for a gubernatorial election in Oregon. Atiyeh carried all 36 counties in the state.

As governor, Atiyeh established new public safety programs for Oregon's traditional fishing and lumber trades. He provided incentives to bring new industries to the state to diversify the economy, including the opening of a trade office in Tokyo, Japan, Oregon's first overseas trade office. He launched a worldwide tourism initiative and worked towards the designation of the Columbia River Gorge as a national scenic preservation area. These efforts earned him the nickname "Trader Vic." As a result, the international concourse at Portland International Airport is dedicated to him and contains a statue of him.

Atiyeh helped establish a statewide food bank, which was the nation's first. He also worked to raise awareness of the dangers of drunk driving and signed new laws against the practice. He chaired the Republican Governors Association and was the Republican National Convention's floor leader for President Ronald Reagan in 1984.

=== 1980 Eruption of Mount St. Helens ===
One of the most publicized crises of Governor Atiyeh's first term was the historic eruption of Mount St. Helens, a volcano situated about 35 miles north of the Oregon-Washington border. The eruption happened on the morning of Sunday, May 18, 1980, and the initial eruption lasted about 9 hours. The eruption was and still is the most destructive volcanic eruption in United States history, killing 57 people and destroying 150 square miles of trees. Volcanic debris and ash was expelled over 15 miles into the air, and although southwesterly winds on the day of the eruption spared Oregon from experiencing the large amounts of ashfall that Washington and Idaho did from the initial eruption, there were heavy concerns about ash impacting water treatment facilities and other agricultural features in Oregon. Over the next few months, ash from subsequent smaller eruptions continued to intermittently impact Oregon, specifically in the Portland-metro area. Atiyeh's administration responded to the crisis by declaring a state of emergency in Clatsop, Columbia, Washington, Multnomah, and Clackamas Counties, and continuing to monitor water reservoirs and rainfall for dangerous amounts of acidity caused by the ashfalls in the following months.

=== The Rajneesh crisis (1981-85) ===
In 1981, 64,281 acres of land—formerly known as Big Muddy Ranch—was purchased for $5.75 million near Antelope, a small town in Central Oregon (population 40 in 1981). The property became the location of Rajneeshpuram, a religious commune established by the followers of Bhagwan Shree Rajneesh, who moved from India. Tensions between local residents of Antelope, the Rajneeshee community, and state officials increased over various issues like land use, incorporation, and political influence. As the conflict escalated, it drew national attention due to multiple criminal activities associated with Rajneeshee community members, including bio-terror attacks, immigration fraud, and internal power struggles within Rajneeshpuram leadership. The situation led to increased involvement from both the state and federal authorities which ultimately culminated in the collapse of Rajneeshpuram and the departure and subsequent arrests of its leadership in the fall of 1985.

Soon after Rajneeshpuram's successful incorporation in May 1981, legal disputes emerged among state officials, including the administration of Governor Atiyeh, regarding land use laws and the constitutional separation of church and state. In August 1981, the Wasco County government granted permission to locate fifty-four mobile homes on the property, which raised concerns among 1000 Friends of Oregon, a group whose purpose was to defend land-use laws in Oregon. By 1982, changes on the ranch began to affect systems within Antelope, to such an extent the many statewide elected officials, including Atiyeh, received letters and phone calls about the Rajneeshees. In the spring of 1982, numerous known residents of the commune arrived in Antelope with "an intent to reside" in the city. Oregon election law dictated that if any person showed an intent to reside in the city, they were then able to vote in city elections. In April 1982, legal efforts to disincorporate Rajneeshpuram were defeated.

Although Atiyeh maintained to never personally or publicly meet with the Rajneeshee leadership, Atiyeh and Ma Anand Sheela did meet once on June 23, 1983 in Portland, Oregon, at the Greater Portland Convention and Visitors Association at Memorial Coliseum. At the event. they briefly shook hands. The following day, the commune's local newspaper, the Rajneesh Times, published on the front page an image of this moment, with the headline, "Governor Finally Accepts Sheela's Invitation to Visit Rajneeshpuram." Atiyeh never did visit the ranch.

Soon after Rajneespuram was successfully incorporated in May 1981, legal disputes emerged that raised concerns among state officials, including the administration of Governor Atiyeh, regarding land use laws and the constitutional separation of church and state. One of the most notable issues involving the separation of church and state arose when the Antelope public school district was taken control of by the Rajneeshees in September 1983. Local Antelope residents opposed sending their children to school with Rajneeshee children, so the school district was redrawn and local Antelope residents began busing their children to school over 30 miles away to the cities of Maupin and Madras. With the district's restructuring, several local Antelope ranchers were disqualified from their positions on the school board, and these vacant positions were filled by Rajneeshees. With the Rajneeshees in power of the school board, they voted against the redistricting and thus withheld state funds that would have gone towards busing the Antelope locals' children to Maupin and Madras. This raised many concerns over the validity of the Rajneeshee-controlled Antelope school district, with many non-Rajneeshees claiming that since the Rajneeshees were a religious group, this violated the separation of church and state, and they were not entitled to use government funds for the school district. This contributed to more hostility and controversy surrounding the overall Rajneeshee movement and presence in Oregon. Under Atiyeh's administration, the state responded to the conflict primarily through legal means, such as through the courts and the coordination of state and federal authorities. The Rajneeshee-controlled school board ended when Attorney General David Frohnmayer declared the city of Rajneeshpuram illegal and unconstitutional in October 1983, citing its violation of the church and state and its violation of land use laws as the primary reason.

These concerns compounded as the Rajneeshees drew increasing attention from the media and both state and federal government, sowing mistrust from Antelope residents who worried that the Rajneeshees were gaining too much power as a result of their incorporated city. As the tension surrounding Rajneeshpuram increased, the people of Antelope urged Governor Atiyeh to do something about the Rajneeshees. However, Atiyeh maintained a steady and dependable stance focused on problem solving, following due process, and mitigating public outcry. Atiyeh also maintained that he would not meet with the Rajneesh leadership, as it would give them legitimacy by feeding into their wishes for publicity. Instead, Atiyeh's administration communicated with the Rajneeshees through Geraldine "Gerry" Thompson, Atiyeh's Chief of Staff. During a discrete meeting between Thompson and certain members of Rajneeshee leadership, including Ma Anand Sheela and Krishna "KD" Deva, Thompson established a "private link" with KD, who then informed Atiyeh's administration of much of what was transpiring at Rajneeshpuram.

In September 1984, 751 people developed salmonellosis (otherwise known as a salmonella infection) across ten local restaurants in The Dalles, Oregon, due to deliberate contamination of salad bars with the bacteria. Throughout the outbreak, 45 people were hospitalized, but there were no known fatalities. On February 28, 1985, Congressman James H. Weaver gave a speech in the U.S. House of Representatives, in which he formally accused the Rajneeshees of "sprinkling salmonella culture on salad bar ingredients in eight restaurants." Atiyeh later suggested in a 2011 interview with The Oregonian that he may have been poisoned by members of the Rajneesh group on the night before a 1985 legislative session, stating a sudden episode of dizziness and illness. Later that night Atiyeh went to the hospital and was kept overnight, but noted that "they never could say what it was."

From September to October 1984, over 4,000 homeless individuals from across the United States were bused into Rajneeshpuram, through what was called the Share-a-Home program that was purported to "house the nation's most vulnerable population." Weeks after the program's launch, State Legislator Wayne Fawbush expressed a sentiment shared with many Oregonians, that the real purpose for the program was to swing the Wasco County elections in November. As tensions escalated between the Rajneeshees and state officials, and as media attention by state and national news intensified, Atiyeh faced a suggestion that he declare a state of emergency and involve the national guard. Perceived inaction of state officials prompted anti-Rajneesh activists to call for the revocation of Atiyeh's governorship. At the same time, following the arrival of homeless individuals at Rajneeshpuram in September, many began to leave—some voluntarily, and others by force from Rajneesh leadership, including Ma Anand Sheela. After it was announced by the commune that they will no longer provide transportation to these individuals outside of Oregon, and despite the insistence of lack of state funds, Governor Atiyeh secretly coordinated donations to help cover the cost of return tickets.

Towards the end of the Rajneeshees' presence in Oregon, tensions between residents of Antelope, and Wasco and Jefferson counties, and the members of Rajneeshpuram had reached a peak. Many Oregonians feared that this tension would culminate in violence, similar to that of the Jonestown massacre that had occurred less than a decade prior. Public concern intensified following Ma Anand Sheela's inflammatory media appearances and the controversies surrounding the poisoning in the Dalles and the Share-a-Home program. These concerns were shared by the governor's office. In 1985, Governor Atiyeh began carrying an unsigned declaration of martial law wherever he went, in case it became necessary to use it. In mid-September 1985, Atiyeh ordered the Oregon National Guard to train near Rajneeshpuram as another precaution in case of possible violence. This coincided with the beginning of the deterioration between Rajneeshpuram's leadership.

Unsigned proclamation that would have established martial law in Jefferson and Wasco counties in response to the Rajneesh situation.

In September 1985, Ma Anand Sheela fled the United States amidst criminal allegations made against her by the Bhagwan, of which included poisoning and conspiracy to commit murder. In October 1985, Bhagwan and Sheela, along with six other leaders within Rajneeshpuram were indicted by a Federal grand jury for attempting to evade Federal immigration laws. The Bhagwan was arrested at two in the morning at Charlotte-Douglas Airport in Charlotte, North Carolina, as he was attempting to flee the country. Ma Anand Sheela was arrested in West Germany, along with another woman, Ma Yoga Vidya. Governor Atiyeh never had to declare martial law and was praised by many for the way in which he handled the Rajneeshee presence in Oregon.

=== Volunteer and charitable work ===
Atiyeh had a long relationship with Forest Grove-based Pacific University, serving as a trustee and trustee emeritus and accepting an honorary doctorate from the university in 1996. He donated a trove of his memorabilia to the university library in 2011.

=== Later career ===
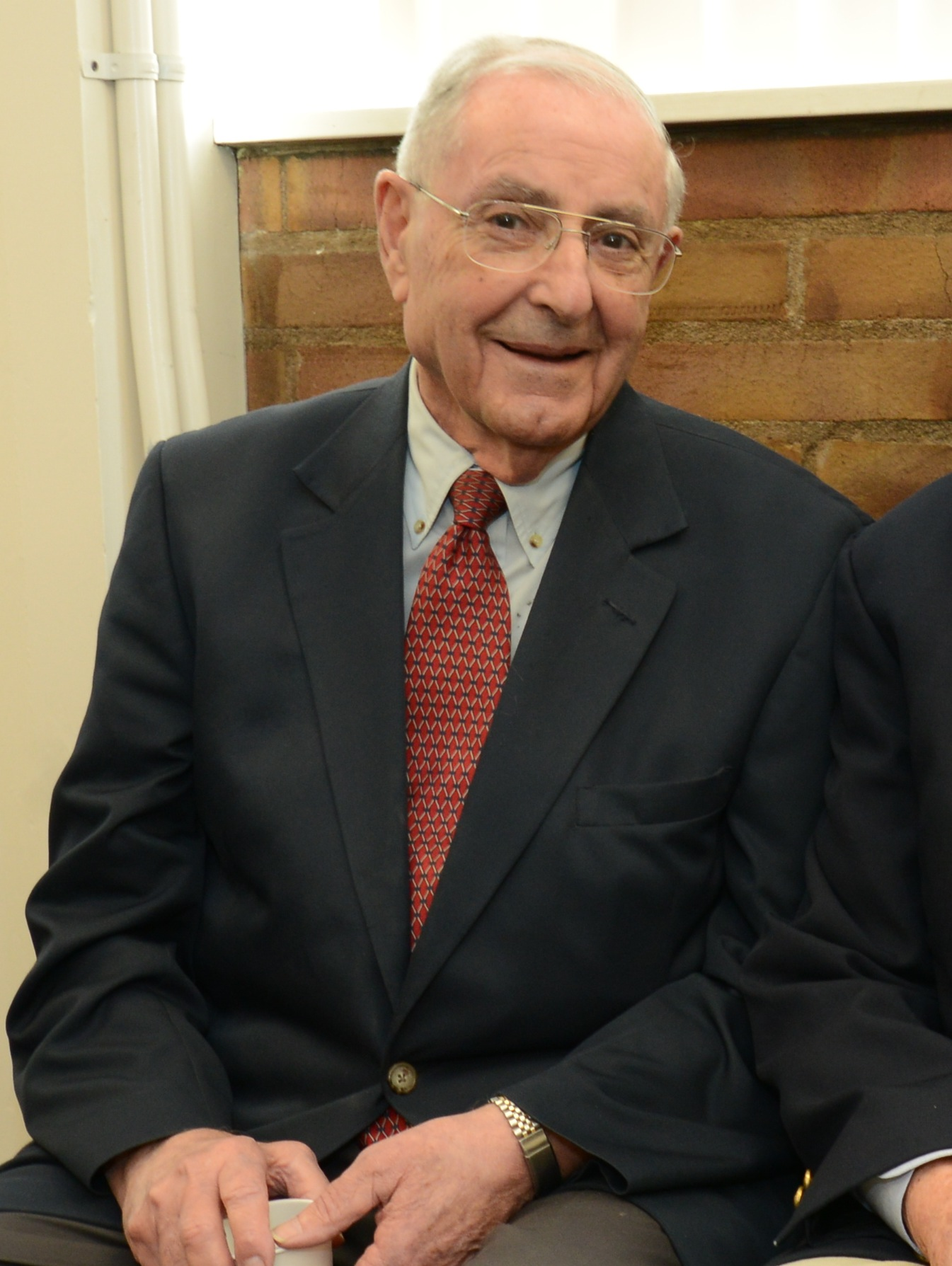
Atiyeh in 2012

After leaving office, Atiyeh became an international trade consultant.

In 2006, Atiyeh co-chaired the "Yes on 49" campaign, supporting Ballot Measure 49, along with Democratic former governor Barbara Roberts, former and future governor John Kitzhaber, and then-governor Ted Kulongoski. He solicited a $100,000 donation to the campaign from Phil Knight, CEO of Nike.

== Personal life ==
Atiyeh lived in Portland with his wife, Dolores (née Hewitt), whom he married on July 5, 1944. They had two children, Tom and Suzanne. Dolores Atiyeh died on August 29, 2016, in Portland at the age of 92.

=== Health and death ===
On August 31, 2005, Atiyeh underwent quadruple bypass surgery; he drove himself to St. Vincent Medical Center after suffering chest pains. Atiyeh was noted for his fiscal conservatism; his spokesman noted that he had stopped on his way to the hospital to fill his car with gas, having observed the sharply rising prices. In the weeks following the surgery, Atiyeh was readmitted to the hospital for several brief stays after suffering shortness of breath and pain in his arms.

On July 5, 2014, Atiyeh fell at his home. He was admitted again to Providence St. Vincent Medical Center, where he was treated for internal bleeding; while he was briefly released, he was re-hospitalized after incurring an adverse reaction to pain medication, and died from kidney failure on July 20, at age 91.

Party political offices
Preceded by Tom McCall	Republican nominee Governor of Oregon; 1974, 1978, 1982	Succeeded by Norma Paulus
Preceded by Robert D. Orr	Chair of the Republican Governors Association; 1983–1984	Succeeded by Dick Thornburgh
Political offices
Preceded by Bob Straub	Governor of Oregon; 1979–1987	Succeeded by Neil Goldschmidt
