= 1970 Oregon gubernatorial election =

- November 3, 1970
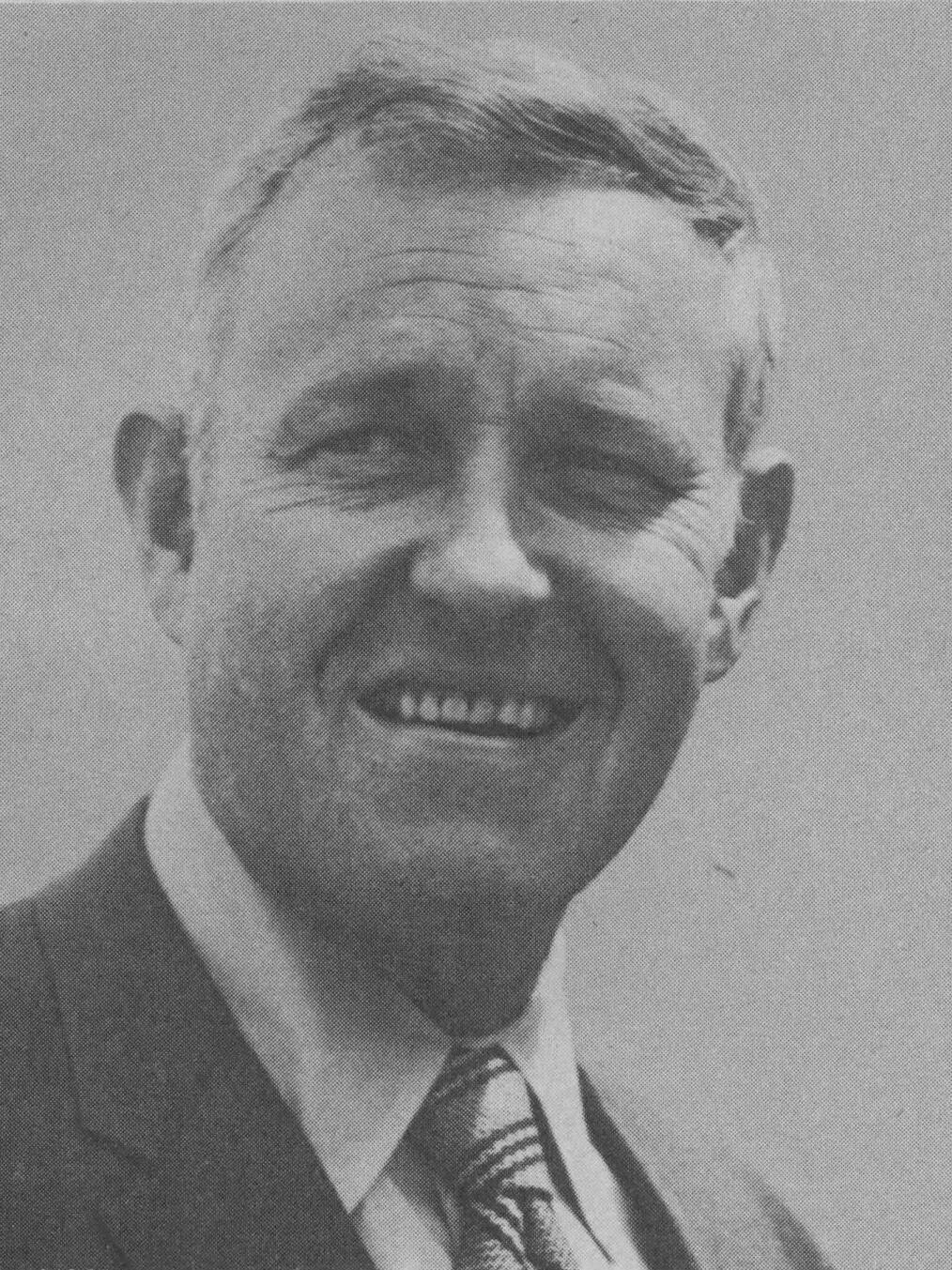

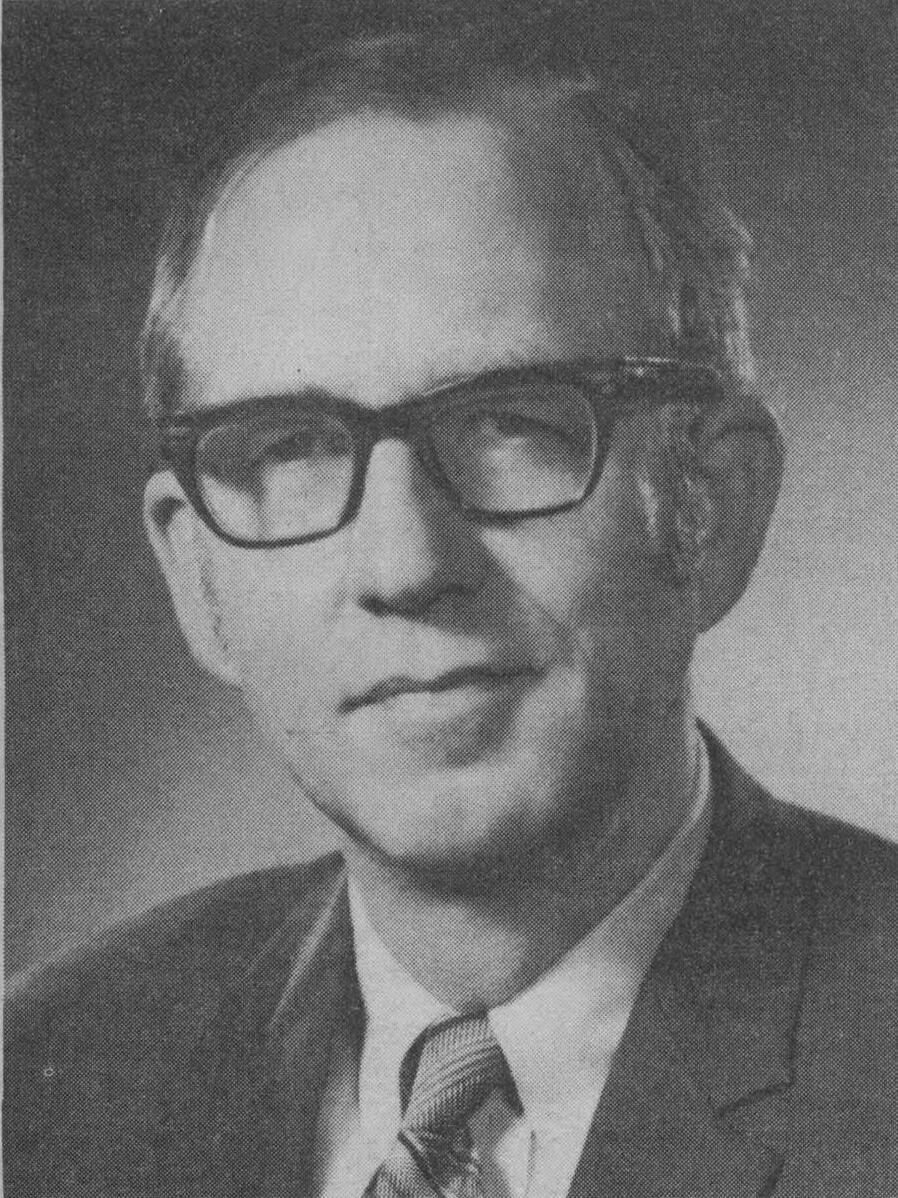
Nominee	Tom McCall	Robert Straub
Party	Republican	Democratic
Popular vote	369,964	293,892
Percentage	55.52%	44.10%
- County results McCall: 50–60% 60–70% Straub: 40–50% 50–60% 60–70%
Governor before election
Tom McCall
Republican
Elected Governor
Tom McCall
Republican

The 1970 Oregon gubernatorial election took place on November 3, 1970. In a rematch of the 1966 contest, Republican incumbent Tom McCall defeated Democratic nominee Robert W. Straub to win re-election.

== Primary election ==
Oregon held primary elections on May 26, 1970.

=== Republican party ===
==== Candidates ====
- Andrew R. Gigler, small business owner from Klamath Falls
- Tom McCall, incumbent governor
- Robert H. Wampler, former officer of the Oregon State Police and independent candidate for governor in 1962

==== Results ====
Republican primary results
Party	Candidate	Votes	%
Republican	Tom McCall (inc.)	183,298	74.39%
Republican	Robert H. Wampler	38,322	15.55%
Republican	Andrew R. Gigler	24,797	10.06%
Total votes		236,245	100.00%

=== Democratic party ===
==== Candidates ====
- L. B. Baxter
- Gracie Hansen
- Al Holdiman Sr.
- James Gordon Morris
- Arthur Pearl
- E. Allen Propst, farmer from Linn County
- Robert W. Straub, Oregon State Treasurer and nominee for governor in 1966
- M. A. Yegge

==== Results ====
Democratic primary results
Party	Candidate	Votes	%
Democratic	Robert W. Straub	182,683	65.87%
Democratic	Arthur Pearl	33,716	12.16%
Democratic	Gracie Hansen	20,329	7.33%
Democratic	Al Holdiman Sr.	18,180	6.56%
Democratic	James Gordon Morris	8,735	3.15%
Democratic	L. B. Baxter	6,477	2.34%
Democratic	E. Allen Propst	5,923	2.14%
Democratic	M. A. Yegge	1,296	0.47%
Total votes		277,339	100.00%

== General election ==
=== Results ===
1970 Oregon gubernatorial election
Party	Candidate	Votes	%	±%
Republican	Tom McCall (inc.)	369,964	55.52%	+0.26%
Democratic	Robert W. Straub	293,892	44.10%	−0.56%
Write-in	Doug Yeager	1,545	0.23%	
Write-in	Scattering	993	0.15%	
Total votes		666,394	100.00%	
Majority		76,072	11.42%	
Republican hold		Swing	+0.82%	

=== Results by county ===
Straub was the first Democrat to win Klamath County in a gubernatorial election since Sylvester Pennoyer in 1890. Additionally, Grant County voted Democratic for the first time since 1922 and Gilliam County, Lake County, and Morrow County did so for the first time since 1934.

County	Tom McCall Republican		Robert W. Straub Democratic		Doug Yeager Write-in		Scattering Write-in		Margin		Total votes cast
County	#	%	#	%	#	%	#	%	#	%	Total votes cast
Baker	1,895	37.57%	3,085	61.16%	53	1.05%	11	0.22%	-1,190	-23.59%	5,044
Benton	10,796	69.73%	4,596	29.68%	15	0.10%	76	0.49%	6,200	40.04%	15,483
Clackamas	29,289	54.78%	23,961	44.82%	179	0.33%	35	0.07%	5,328	9.97%	53,464
Clatsop	6,009	56.25%	4,646	43.49%	23	0.22%	5	0.05%	1,363	12.76%	10,683
Columbia	4,298	45.60%	5,079	53.89%	20	0.21%	28	0.30%	-781	-8.29%	9,425
Coos	8,213	45.10%	9,989	54.85%	0	0.00%	8	0.04%	-1,776	-9.75%	18,210
Crook	1,680	52.50%	1,512	47.25%	2	0.06%	6	0.19%	168	5.25%	3,200
Curry	2,044	50.46%	1,995	49.25%	0	0.00%	12	0.30%	49	1.21%	4,051
Deschutes	5,555	57.62%	4,064	42.16%	12	0.12%	9	0.09%	1,491	15.47%	9,640
Douglas	9,795	48.18%	10,322	50.77%	212	1.04%	2	0.01%	-527	-2.59%	20,331
Gilliam	409	46.32%	474	53.68%	0	0.00%	0	0.00%	-65	-7.36%	883
Grant	1,054	48.15%	1,125	51.39%	3	0.14%	7	0.32%	-71	-3.24%	2,189
Harney	1,112	50.82%	1,066	48.72%	9	0.41%	1	0.05%	46	2.10%	2,188
Hood River	2,303	55.19%	1,845	44.21%	4	0.10%	21	0.50%	458	10.98%	4,173
Jackson	16,057	58.84%	11,203	41.05%	21	0.08%	9	0.03%	4,854	17.79%	27,290
Jefferson	1,583	59.80%	1,053	39.78%	0	0.00%	11	0.42%	530	20.02%	2,647
Josephine	6,530	54.43%	5,321	44.35%	135	1.13%	11	0.09%	1,209	10.08%	11,997
Klamath	6,617	47.44%	7,178	51.46%	150	1.08%	4	0.03%	-561	-4.02%	13,949
Lake	1,003	49.51%	1,016	50.15%	0	0.00%	7	0.35%	-13	-0.64%	2,026
Lane	35,903	55.93%	28,090	43.76%	27	0.04%	170	0.26%	7,813	12.17%	64,190
Lincoln	5,185	56.83%	3,840	42.09%	27	0.30%	72	0.79%	1,345	14.74%	9,124
Linn	9,854	48.93%	10,275	51.02%	0	0.00%	12	0.06%	-421	-2.09%	20,141
Malheur	3,832	60.46%	2,421	38.20%	43	0.68%	42	0.66%	1,411	22.26%	6,338
Marion	26,579	58.78%	18,530	40.98%	54	0.12%	52	0.12%	8,049	17.80%	45,215
Morrow	825	46.48%	843	47.49%	4	0.23%	103	5.80%	-18	-1.01%	1,775
Multnomah	108,161	55.55%	86,072	44.20%	289	0.15%	192	0.10%	22,089	11.34%	194,714
Polk	5,998	56.83%	4,542	43.04%	7	0.07%	7	0.07%	1,456	13.80%	10,554
Sherman	486	56.25%	373	43.17%	0	0.00%	5	0.58%	113	13.08%	864
Tillamook	3,794	60.71%	2,434	38.95%	6	0.10%	15	0.24%	1,360	21.76%	6,249
Umatilla	6,708	51.41%	6,266	48.02%	74	0.57%	0	0.00%	442	3.39%	13,048
Union	3,096	47.46%	3,415	52.35%	12	0.18%	1	0.02%	-319	-4.89%	6,524
Wallowa	1,319	55.47%	1,059	44.53%	0	0.00%	0	0.00%	260	10.93%	2,378
Wasco	3,506	53.48%	3,016	46.00%	8	0.12%	26	0.40%	490	7.47%	6,556
Washington	31,252	62.88%	18,292	36.81%	128	0.26%	27	0.05%	12,960	26.08%	49,699
Wheeler	238	38.64%	376	61.04%	0	0.00%	2	0.32%	-138	-22.40%	616
Yamhill	6,986	60.56%	4,518	39.16%	28	0.24%	4	0.03%	2,468	21.39%	11,536
Total	369,964	55.52%	293,892	44.10%	1,545	0.23%	993	0.15%	76,072	11.42%	666,394

==== Counties that flipped from Republican to Democratic ====
- Baker
- Douglas
- Gilliam
- Grant
- Klamath
- Lake
- Linn
- Morrow
- Wheeler
