= Robert W. Straub =

31st Governor of Oregon

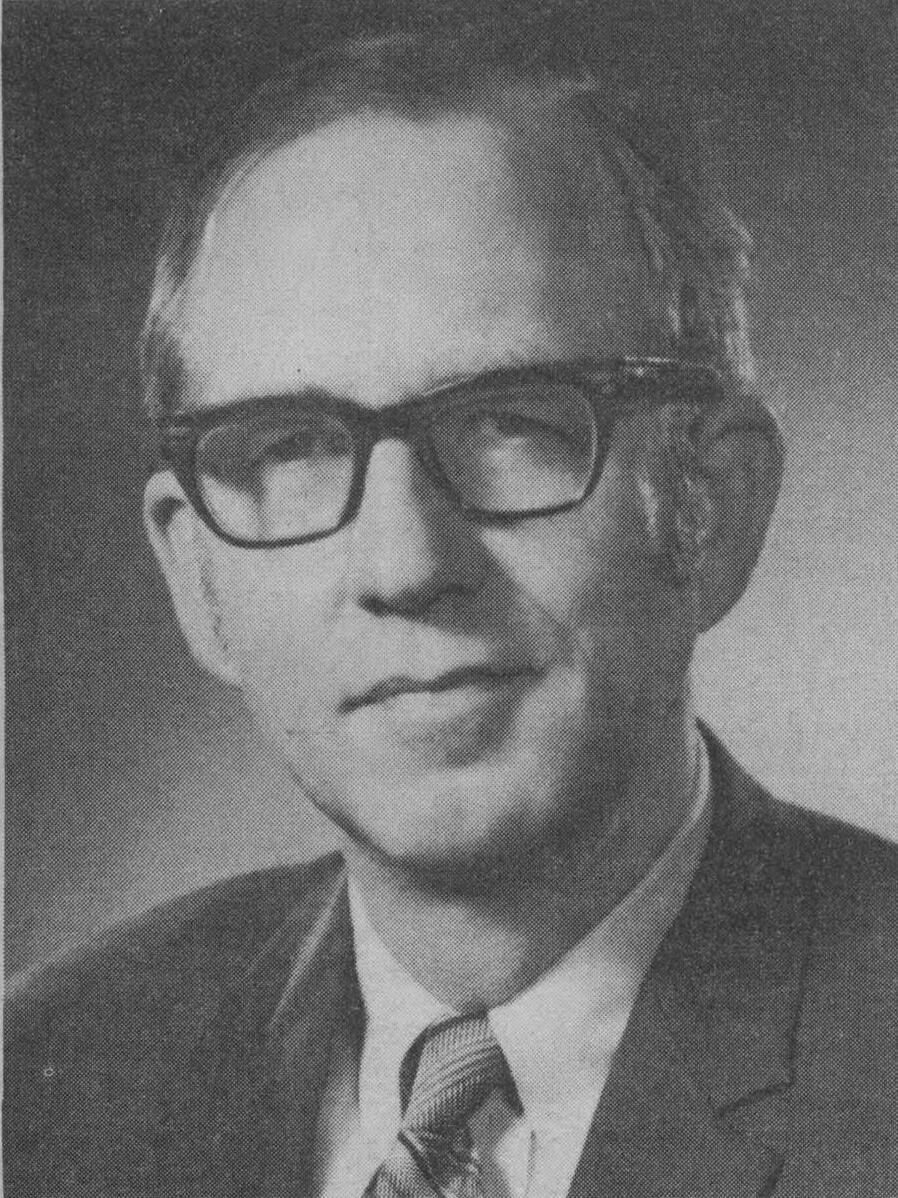
- Straub in 1970

31st Governor of Oregon
- In office January 13, 1975 – January 8, 1979
- Preceded by: Tom McCall
- Succeeded by: Victor Atiyeh

20th Treasurer of Oregon
- In office January 4, 1965 – January 1, 1973
- Governor: Mark Hatfield; Tom McCall
- Preceded by: Howard C. Belton
- Succeeded by: James A. Redden

Member of the Oregon State Senate
- In office 1959–1963

Personal details
- Born: Robert William Straub; May 6, 1920 San Francisco, California, U.S.
- Died: November 27, 2002 (aged 82) Springfield, Oregon, U.S.
- Party: Democratic
- Spouse: Pat Straub (m. 1943)
- Education: Dartmouth College (BA, MBA)
- Profession: Politician

Military service
- Allegiance: United States
- Branch/service: United States Army
- Unit: Army Quartermaster Corps
- Battles/wars: World War II

Robert William Straub (May 6, 1920 – November 27, 2002) was an American politician and businessman from the state of Oregon. A native of San Francisco, California, he settled in Eugene, Oregon, where he entered politics. A Democratic politician, he served in the Oregon State Senate, as the Oregon State Treasurer, and one term as the 31st governor of Oregon from 1975 to 1979. Like his perennial opponent for governor, Tom McCall, he was a noted environmentalist.

== Early life ==
Robert William Straub was born on May 6, 1920, in San Francisco. His parents were Thomas J. and Mary Tulley Straub who were staunch Republicans. During World War II, he served in the Army's Quartermaster Corps. Straub earned a Bachelor of Arts degree from Dartmouth College in 1943, and then a masters of business administration from the school in 1947.

While a student at Dartmouth, he married Pat Straub (née Stroud) in 1943, and they had three sons and three daughters. In 1946, the family moved to Springfield, Oregon, when Straub accepted a job at the new Weyerhaeuser facility there. At Weyerhaeuser he worked with former classmate and later Speaker of the Oregon House of Representatives Richard Eymann. Straub also established a construction firm. He became independently wealthy by investing in the stock market, in real estate development, and trading in timber.

== Political career ==
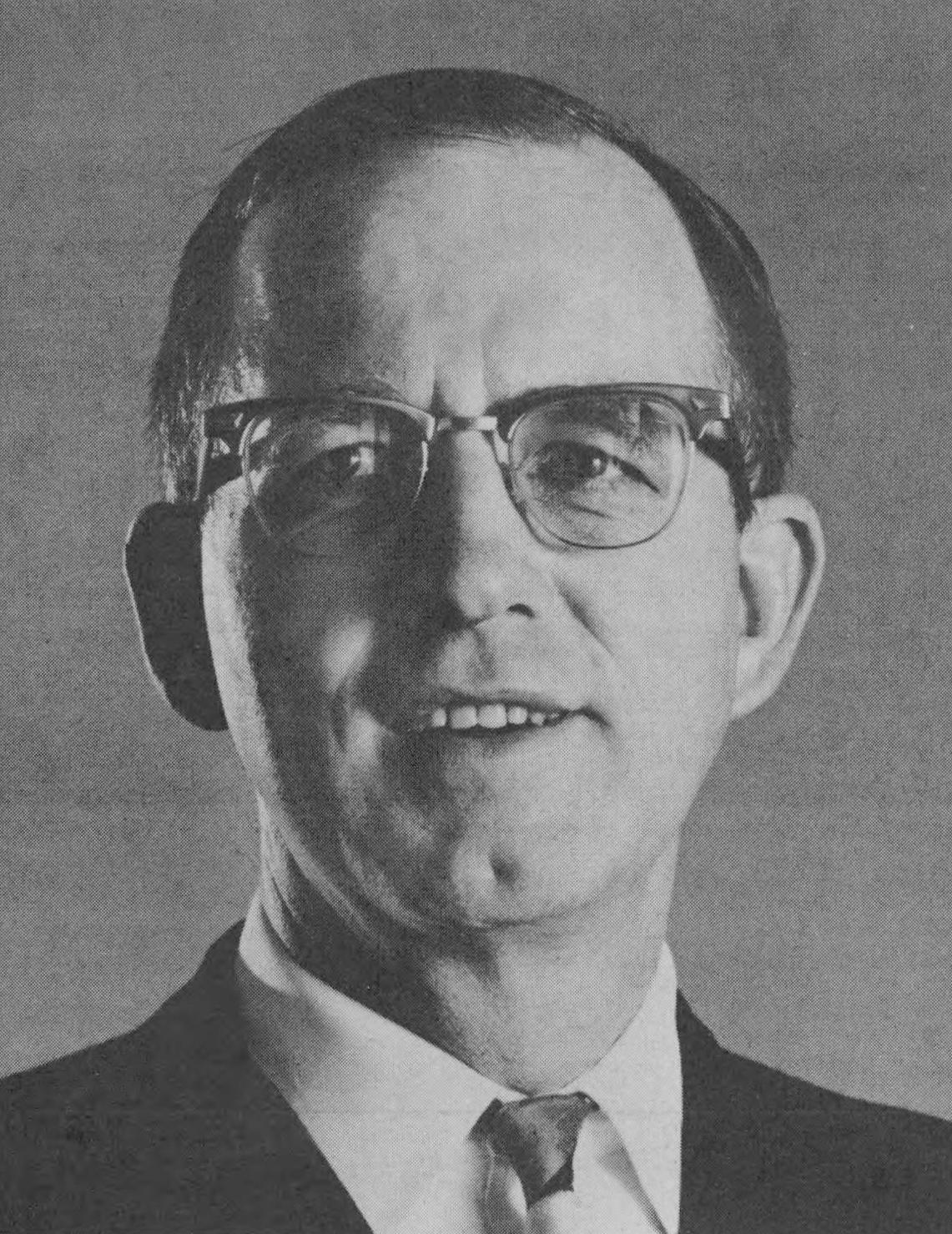
Straub in 1968 during his campaign for State Treasurer

Straub worked at his construction firm until beginning his political career when he was elected to the Lane County Board of Commissioners in 1954. Straub served on the commission from 1955 to 1959. He represented Lane County in the Oregon State Senate from 1959 to 1963. During his time in the senate, Straub established his reputation as an advocate for natural resource management and conservation. He was one of the state's first leaders to voice concern about air and water pollution.

In 1964, Straub was elected to a four-year term as the Oregon State Treasurer. Two years later he ran unsuccessfully for the Governor's office, losing to Tom McCall. As State Treasurer, Straub worked to create the Local Government Investment Pool and the Oregon Public Employees Retirement System (PERS). He also opposed construction on U.S. Highway 101 planned for an area south of Tillamook where the highway was planned to go across the Nestucca River, up the sandspit past Cape Kiwanda along the ocean front. He helped lead those opposed to the plan and was able to get the highway built closer to its previous location inland. Straub served two terms in the office, from 1965 to 1973, and lost a second bid against McCall in 1970.

=== Governor of Oregon ===
McCall was prohibited by the state constitution from seeking a third consecutive term in the 1974 election. Straub was finally able to win the state's top job that year, defeating then-State Senator Victor Atiyeh, winning the largest margin in an Oregon gubernatorial race since 1950. Straub's tenure as governor saw the state's energy and land use laws strengthened. He also worked to increase property tax relief and to provide utility rate relief for senior citizens. He appointed more women, minorities and disabled people to head state agencies than any previous Oregon governor. Other accomplishments included reducing the unemployment rate to 5% from 12% and working to end plans for the proposed controversial Mount Hood Freeway. Straub was defeated in his re-election bid in 1978 in a rematch with Atiyeh.

== Later years ==
Following his reelection defeat, Straub owned and operated farms in Salem, Springfield, Curtin, and Willamina. In addition, he also operated a ranch in Wheeler County. Straub considered running against Republican U.S. Senator Bob Packwood in the 1986 election, but decided not to enter the race. In 1987, Nestucca Spit State Park near Pacific City was renamed Bob Straub State Park in his honor, and a conference room at Lane County's government offices was named in his honor in 2001. In 1999, he announced that he was suffering from Alzheimer's disease. He died on November 27, 2002, of complications from the disease in the Gateway Living Center nursing home in Springfield, Oregon at the age of 82.

His legacy still lives on today posthumously by several educational entities, such as Straub Hall of the University of Oregon, and Straub Middle School in Salem, Oregon.

Political offices
Preceded by Howard C. Belton	Oregon State Treasurer; 1965–1973	Succeeded by James A. Redden
Preceded by Tom McCall	Governor of Oregon; 1975–1979	Succeeded by Victor G. Atiyeh
Party political offices
Preceded by Robert Y. Thornton	Democratic nominee for Governor of Oregon; 1966, 1970, 1974, 1978	Succeeded by Ted Kulongoski
