= 1966 Oregon gubernatorial election =

- November 8, 1966
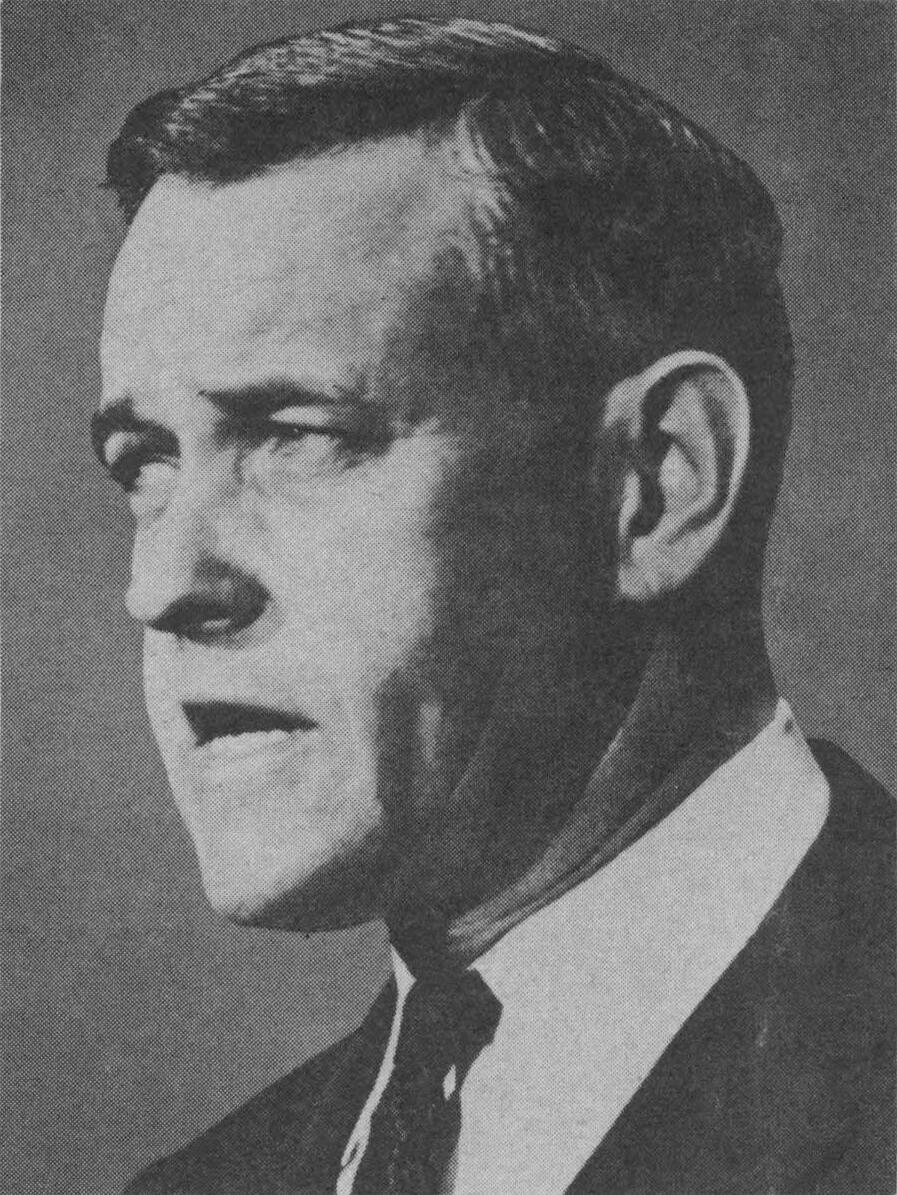

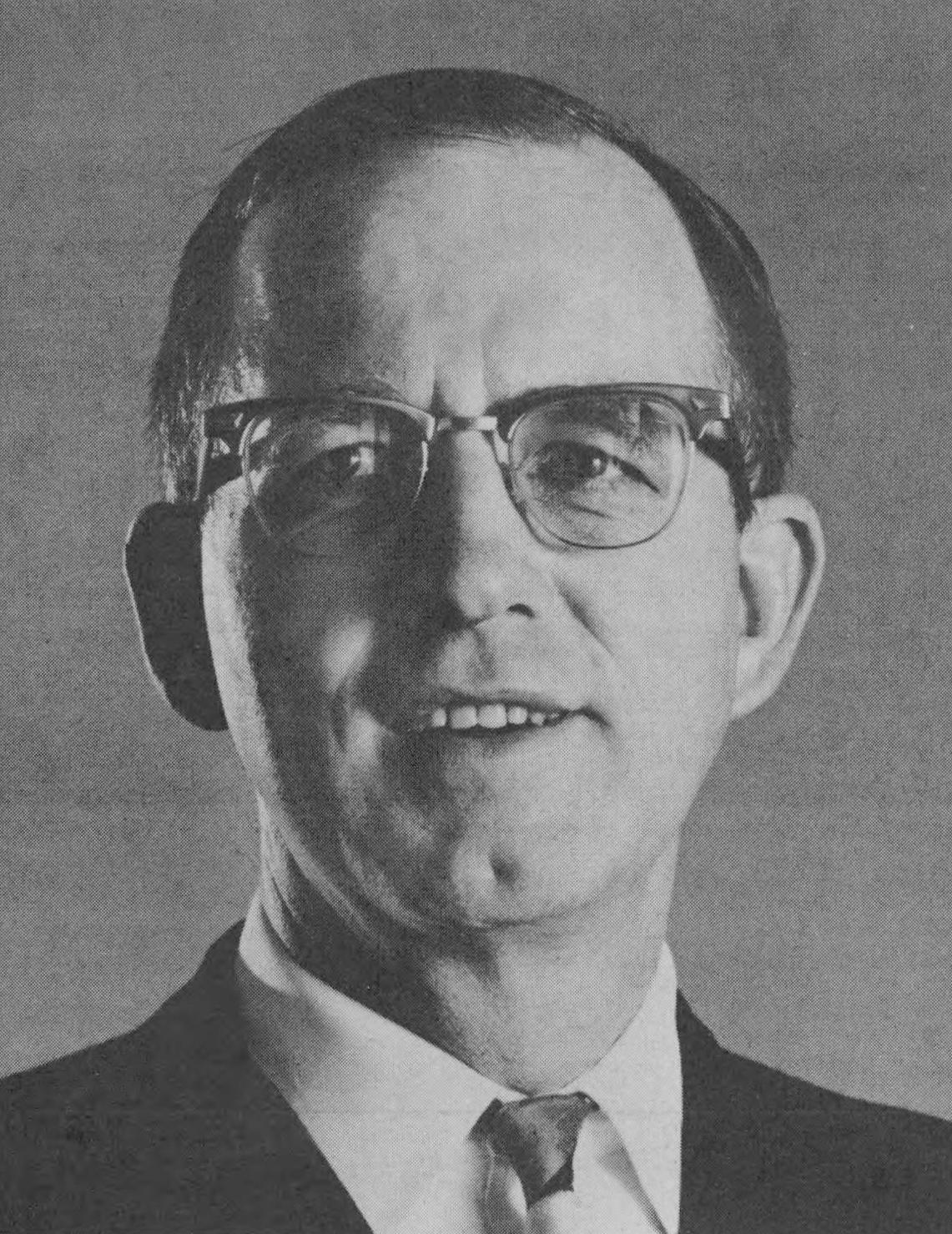
Nominee	Tom McCall	Robert Straub
Party	Republican	Democratic
Popular vote	377,346	305,008
Percentage	55.26%	44.67%
- County results McCall: 50–60% 60–70% Straub: 50–60%
Governor before election
Mark Hatfield
Republican
Elected Governor
Tom McCall
Republican

The 1966 Oregon gubernatorial election took place on November 8, 1966. Republican nominee Tom McCall defeated Democratic nominee Robert W. Straub to win the election.

== Primary election ==
Oregon held primary elections on May 24, 1966.

=== Republican party ===
==== Candidates ====
- Tom McCall, Secretary of State of Oregon
- John Laurin Reynolds, architect from Portland

==== Results ====
Republican primary results
Party	Candidate	Votes	%
Republican	Tom McCall	215,959	91.41%
Republican	John Laurin Reynolds	20,286	8.59%
Total votes		236,245	100.00%

=== Democratic party ===
==== Candidates ====
- Margaret Mary Fields
- Ben Musa, member of Oregon State Senate
- Emmet T. Rogers
- Robert W. Straub, Oregon State Treasurer

==== Results ====
Democratic primary results
Party	Candidate	Votes	%
Democratic	Robert W. Straub	182,697	72.51%
Democratic	Ben Musa	41,610	16.51%
Democratic	Emmet T. Rogers	17,618	6.99%
Democratic	Margaret Mary Fields	10,033	3.98%
Total votes		251,958	100.00%

== General election ==
=== Results ===
1966 Oregon gubernatorial election
Party	Candidate	Votes	%	±%
Republican	Tom McCall	377,346	55.26%	+1.06%
Democratic	Robert W. Straub	305,008	44.67%	+3.04%
Write-in	Scattering	508	0.07%	
Total votes		682,862	100.00%	
Majority		72,338	10.59%	
Republican hold		Swing	-1.98%	

=== Results by county ===
County	Tom McCall Republican		Robert W. Straub Democratic		Scattering Write-in		Margin		Total votes cast
County	#	%	#	%	#	%	#	%	Total votes cast
Baker	2,851	51.15%	2,721	48.82%	2	0.04%	130	2.33%	5,574
Benton	9,438	66.23%	4,813	33.77%	0	0.00%	4,625	32.45%	14,251
Clackamas	29,025	57.36%	21,531	42.55%	44	0.09%	7,494	14.81%	50,600
Clatsop	5,911	53.52%	5,130	46.45%	4	0.04%	781	7.07%	11,045
Columbia	4,121	45.81%	4,872	54.16%	2	0.02%	-781	-8.35%	8,995
Coos	7,912	43.07%	10,441	56.83%	19	0.10%	-2,529	-13.77%	18,372
Crook	1,638	58.00%	1,185	41.96%	1	0.04%	453	16.04%	2,824
Curry	2,065	50.32%	2,037	49.63%	2	0.05%	28	0.68%	4,104
Deschutes	5,415	58.85%	3,786	41.14%	1	0.01%	1,629	17.70%	9,202
Douglas	11,271	52.01%	10,375	47.87%	26	0.12%	896	4.13%	21,672
Gilliam	566	55.71%	450	44.29%	0	0.00%	116	11.42%	1,016
Grant	1,495	61.15%	950	38.85%	0	0.00%	545	22.29%	2,445
Harney	1,372	56.30%	1,060	43.50%	5	0.21%	312	12.80%	2,437
Hood River	2,561	56.00%	2,012	44.00%	0	0.00%	549	12.01%	4,573
Jackson	17,273	60.67%	11,190	39.31%	6	0.02%	6,083	21.37%	28,469
Jefferson	1,552	61.49%	972	38.51%	0	0.00%	580	22.98%	2,524
Josephine	6,805	56.62%	5,200	43.26%	14	0.12%	1,605	13.35%	12,019
Klamath	7,664	54.01%	6,498	45.79%	28	0.20%	1,166	8.22%	14,190
Lake	1,306	60.43%	855	39.57%	0	0.00%	451	20.87%	2,161
Lane	35,028	52.42%	31,740	47.50%	59	0.09%	3,288	4.92%	66,827
Lincoln	5,062	53.22%	4,443	46.71%	6	0.06%	619	6.51%	9,511
Linn	10,953	53.98%	9,338	46.02%	0	0.00%	1,615	7.96%	20,291
Malheur	4,496	66.70%	2,245	33.30%	0	0.00%	2,251	33.39%	6,741
Marion	27,597	61.87%	16,921	37.94%	87	0.20%	10,676	23.93%	44,605
Morrow	913	53.24%	802	46.76%	0	0.00%	111	6.47%	1,715
Multnomah	109,842	52.35%	99,875	47.60%	124	0.06%	9,967	4.75%	209,841
Polk	6,758	61.16%	4,276	38.70%	16	0.14%	2,482	22.46%	11,050
Sherman	675	62.79%	400	37.21%	0	0.00%	275	25.58%	1,075
Tillamook	3,827	57.53%	2,815	42.32%	10	0.12%	1,012	15.21%	6,652
Umatilla	7,141	53.95%	6,092	46.03%	3	0.02%	1,049	7.93%	13,236
Union	3,218	49.90%	3,231	50.10%	0	0.00%	-13	-0.20%	6,449
Wallowa	1,403	59.05%	973	40.95%	0	0.00%	430	18.10%	2,376
Wasco	3,863	53.91%	3,301	46.07%	1	0.01%	562	7.84%	7,165
Washington	28,263	62.12%	17,200	37.80%	38	0.08%	11,063	24.31%	45,501
Wheeler	398	56.61%	305	43.39%	0	0.00%	93	13.23%	703
Yamhill	7,668	60.61%	4,973	39.31%	10	0.08%	2,695	21.30%	12,651
Total	377,346	55.26%	305,008	44.67%	508	0.07%	72,338	10.59%	682,862

==== Counties that flipped from Democratic to Republican ====
- Tillamook

==== Counties that flipped from Republican to Democratic ====
- Union
