= Tom McCall =

30th Governor of Oregon (1913–1983)

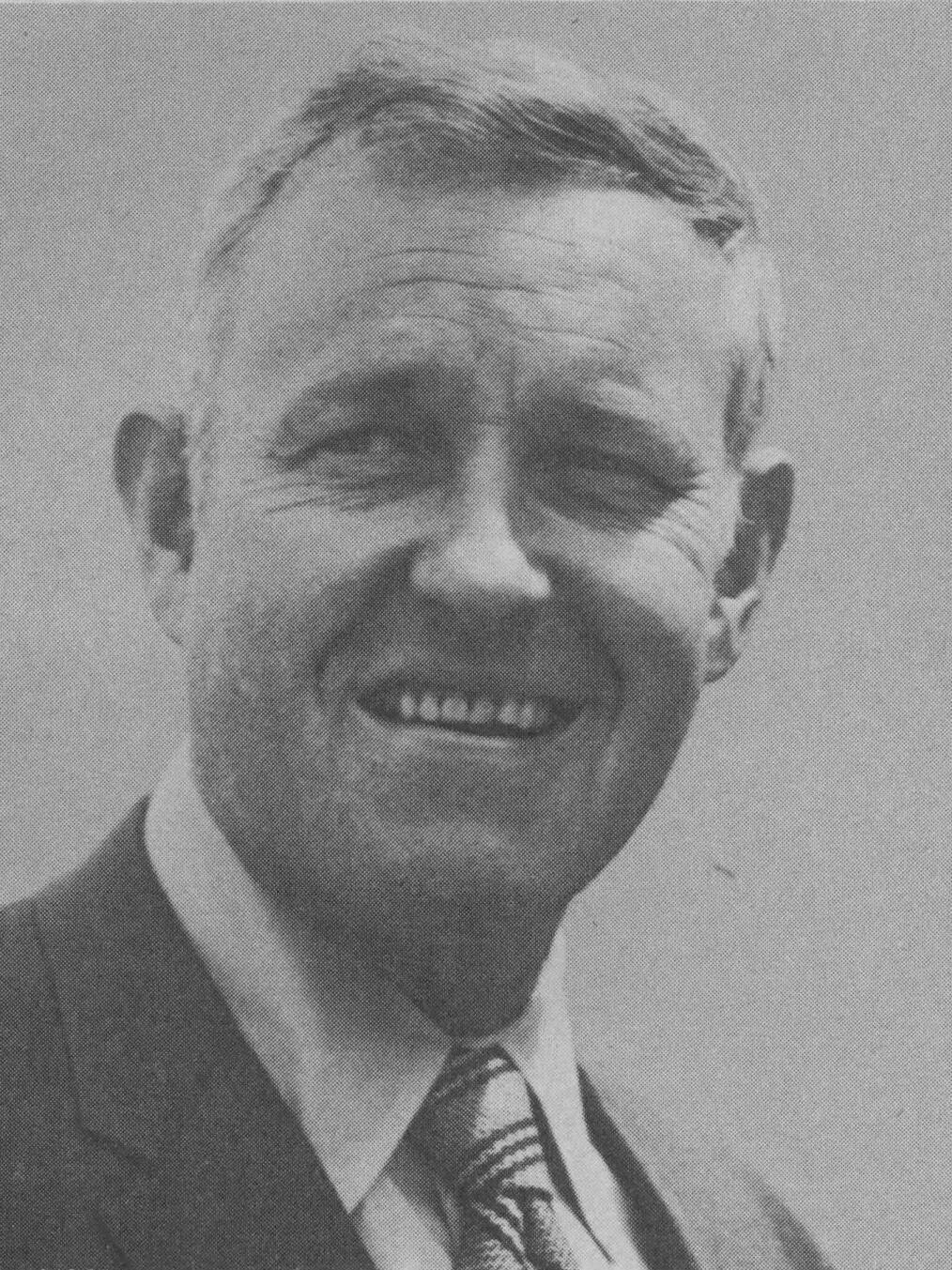
- McCall in 1970

30th Governor of Oregon
- In office January 9, 1967 – January 13, 1975
- Preceded by: Mark Hatfield
- Succeeded by: Robert W. Straub

18th Secretary of State of Oregon
- In office January 4, 1965 – January 9, 1967
- Governor: Mark Hatfield
- Preceded by: Howell Appling
- Succeeded by: Clay Myers

Personal details
- Born: Thomas Lawson McCall; March 22, 1913 Scituate, Massachusetts, U.S.
- Died: January 8, 1983 (aged 69) Portland, Oregon, U.S.
- Party: Republican
- Spouse: Audrey Owen (1939–1983)
- Children: 2 sons
- Education: University of Oregon (BA)
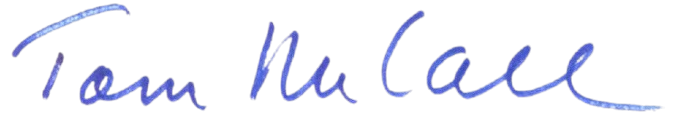
- Signature

Military service
- Allegiance: United States
- Branch/service: United States Navy
- Unit: USS St. Louis
- Battles/wars: World War II • Pacific Theater

Thomas Lawson McCall (March 22, 1913 – January 8, 1983) was an American politician and journalist in the state of Oregon, serving as the state's 30th governor from 1967 to 1975. A progressive Republican, he was known as a staunch environmentalist and an advocate of sustainable development.

Raised in Massachusetts and in central Oregon, McCall attended the University of Oregon and went on to work as a journalist in Moscow, Idaho and in Portland. He started out as a newspaper reporter and moved on to radio and television broadcasting. While at KGW-TV, he produced the documentary Pollution in Paradise, which brought public attention to air and water pollution in Oregon, specifically in the Willamette River.

McCall first entered politics as an administrative assistant to Governor Douglas McKay. He made an unsuccessful bid for Congress in 1954, losing in the general election to Edith Green. In 1964, he was elected as Oregon Secretary of State, and in 1966 he defeated Democrat Bob Straub to become governor. In office, McCall promoted environmentally friendly reforms and criticized overpopulation and excessive industrial development. During his tenure, the state enacted major shoreline conservation, container deposit, and land-use planning legislation. McCall also became known for his colorful rhetoric and for creative problem-solving, notably sponsoring the Vortex I music festival and implementing the country's first odd–even gasoline rationing program during the 1973 oil crisis.

After his response to the oil crisis gained him national recognition, he toured the country promoting the "Oregon Story" as an example for other states to follow, and publicly mulled a third party run for president. In 1974, McCall was awarded an honorary degree from Reed College. In his later career, he focused on preventing the repeal of the land-use laws he'd sponsored and mounted an unsuccessful comeback campaign for governor in 1978.

During Oregon's economic downturn in the early 1980s, McCall was criticized by those who considered his environmental legacy detrimental to the state's economy. His reputation has subsequently recovered, and he is considered one of the most transformative figures in recent Oregon history. Tom McCall Waterfront Park in Portland is one of several places and institutions named in his honor.

== Early life ==
Born in Scituate, Massachusetts, McCall was the son of Hal McCall and Dorothy Lawson McCall, and grandson of copper-king Thomas Lawson and Massachusetts governor and congressman Samuel W. McCall. As a child, he divided his time between Thomas Lawson's Massachusetts estate named Dreamwold and his father's ranch near Prineville, Oregon named Westernwold. This bicoastal upbringing caused him to develop an unusual accent that he characterized as being "a cross between Calvin Coolidge and a Texas Ranger"; his voice would become an asset, setting him apart during his later careers as a public speaker.

Upon graduation from Redmond High School, McCall enrolled at the University of Oregon in Eugene. Due to his family's growing financial problems he was forced to sit out long periods and took five years to earn his degree in journalism. While at Oregon, McCall was a member of the Phi Delta Theta fraternity.

== Journalism career ==
After graduating from U of O in 1936, McCall worked as a summer replacement at the Bend Bulletin, earning $15 a week. He then moved northeast to the Palouse of north central Idaho in February 1937, to the university town of Moscow. He wrote for the News-Review, and following a merger, the Daily Idahonian.

After five years in Moscow, he was encouraged to leave in March 1942; upheaval in the UI athletic department the previous year (firing of football head coach Ted Bank (also athletic director) and basketball head coach Forrest Twogood) brought continuing negative criticism by McCall and his boss thought that he should advance his career elsewhere. He traveled back to Oregon to look for work in Portland, where the economy was booming due to World War II. McCall was told by the military that he was not eligible for enlistment (due to bad knees and a recurring hernia) and journalists, still primarily men, were in short supply. He was quickly offered a job at The Oregonian at nearly triple his wages in Idaho.

McCall later put his career on hold for military service in the U.S. Navy. At age 31, he was the oldest in boot camp. He served as a war correspondent for 16 months aboard the cruiser USS St. Louis in the Pacific Theater.

In 1946, McCall was hired by Portland radio station KEX, Where he remained until 1949 when he became executive secretary to Oregon governor Douglas McKay. In 1952, McCall joined KGW radio in Portland, where he served as a newscaster and political commentator until 1955, when he transitioned from radio to television at KPTV.

After a year and a half at KPTV, McCall returned to KGW just as the radio station began to branch into television broadcasting. McCall served a commentator for KGW-TV's news broadcasts from the station's sign-on in December 1956 through early 1964, at which point he left to focus on his campaign for Oregon's secretary of state.

In 1962, McCall produced and narrated Pollution in Paradise, a documentary focused on pollution in and around Oregon. Produced at a cost of $16,000, the documentary principally concerned the impacts of mill runoff and pesticide use on the Willamette River, along with industrial air pollution in various locales. Pollution in Paradise first aired on November 21, 1962 on KGW-TV.

McCall made an uncredited cameo as a TV newscaster in the 1975 film One Flew Over the Cuckoo's Nest.

== Political career ==
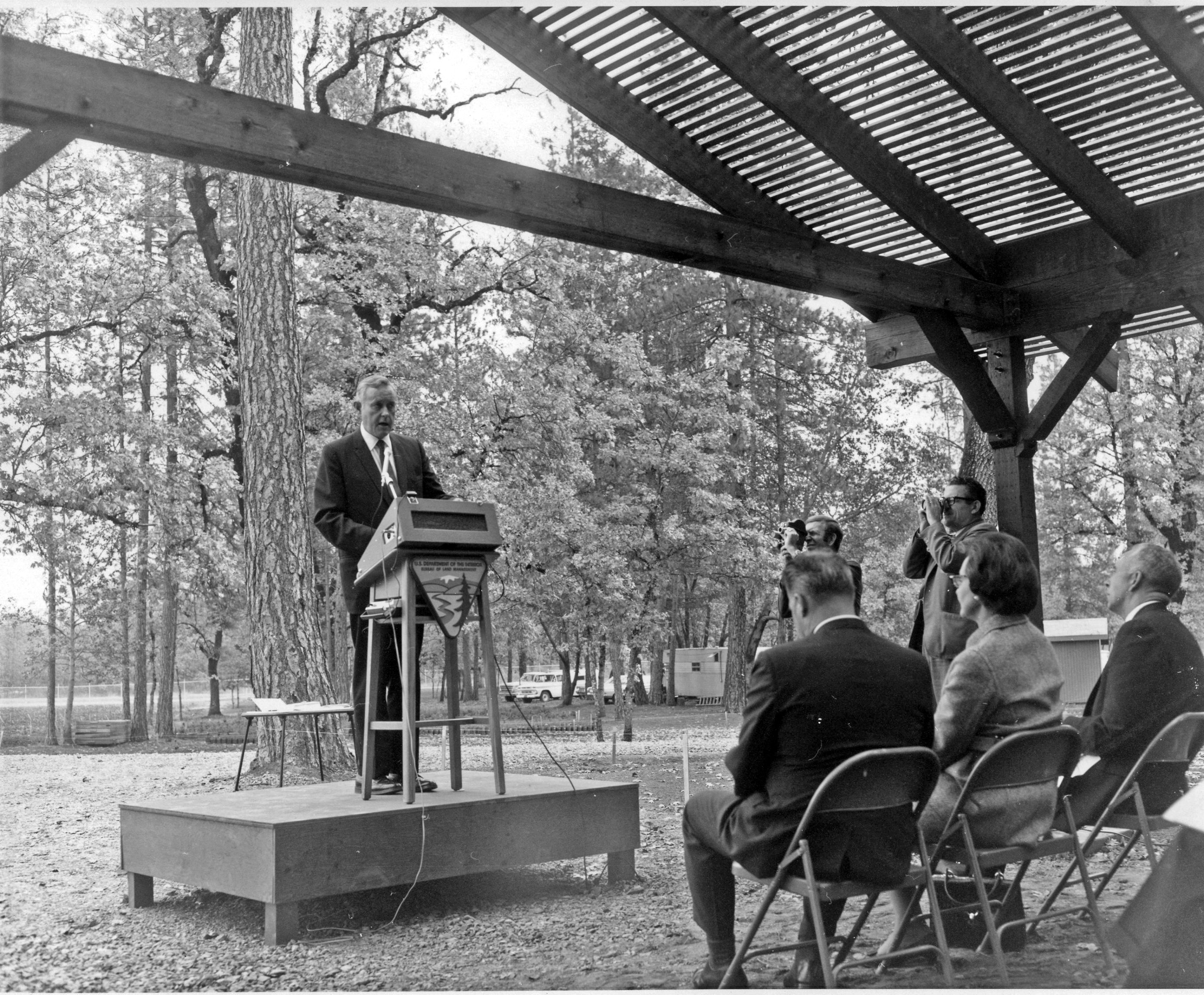
McCall speaking at the Charles A. Sprague Tree Seed Orchard dedication ceremony in Merlin, Oregon, October 23, 1969.

McCall made his first run for office in 1954, winning the Republican nomination for Oregon's third district seat over eight-term incumbent Homer D. Angell. Despite his later reputation as a progressive, McCall ran to Angell's right in the primary, portraying himself as a loyal supporter of Dwight D. Eisenhower's pro-business policies. He lost the general election to Edith Green, who went on to hold the seat for the next ten terms.

In 1958, when Mark Hatfield was elected governor of Oregon, he vacated the position of Secretary of State. McCall later said he thought Hatfield had promised to appoint him to the unexpired portion of the term, but the job went to Hatfield associate Howell Appling instead. When Appling chose not to run for re-election in 1964, McCall sought and won the office. In this position, he began to focus on fighting pollution and reining in unchecked economic growth, claiming that "Oregon is at a crossroads [...] There is still a chance to choose between the polluted chaos of Southern California and cleanliness."

=== First term ===
McCall was elected governor in 1966, defeating the Democratic nominee, State Treasurer Robert W. Straub. During his first term, McCall lead a cleanup of pulp mill pollution in the Willamette, championed legislation that strengthened public ownership of Oregon's beaches, dealt with a major riot at the Oregon State Penitentiary in Salem, and served as an international monitor for the 1967 South Vietnamese presidential election.

=== Vortex I ===
During the late summer of 1970, McCall was faced with a potential riot in Portland. In May of that year a week-long student protest at Portland State University over the Kent State shootings had been violently dispersed by police, and tensions were high. The conservative American Legion had scheduled a convention in Portland later that summer; local antiwar groups were organizing a series of demonstrations at the same time under the name of the "People's Army Jamboree" and expected to draw up to 50,000 protesters.

After attempts to convince the People's Army Jamboree to either not carry out their plans or to move the date, McCall was convinced by a group of hippies to hold the country's first state-sponsored rock festival at Milo McIver State Park near Estacada, Oregon. "Vortex I: A Biodegradable Festival of Life," as it was called, was inspired by the Woodstock Festival held the previous year, and was intended to draw radical youth out of Portland and reduce the potential for confrontation with the Legionnaires. "I think I just committed political suicide," McCall is reported to have remarked immediately after approving the event.

However, the festival, nicknamed "The Governor's Pot Party", was a success, attracting between 50,000 and 100,000 people. The feared violent clash between the antiwar groups and the Legion was avoided, and McCall was re-elected in November with 56% of the vote, again defeating Bob Straub.

=== Second term ===
McCall became nationally known in January 1971 for a comment he made in an interview with CBS News's Terry Drinkwater:

Come visit us again and again. This is a state of excitement. But for heaven's sake, don't come here to live.

He was responding to the rapid population growth and suburban sprawl that the state was then experiencing, which was bringing with it strains on utilities and the rapid loss of arable land in the Willamette Valley. McCall's second-term agenda was focused on ameliorating these issues and protecting Oregonians' quality of life from overdevelopment. Elements of this agenda included the Oregon Bottle Bill, a pioneering container-deposit law intended to reduce litter; and the Oregon Land Conservation and Development Act of 1973, which required comprehensive zoning and land-use planning for the entire state and created urban growth boundaries around each Oregon city.

In July 1971, McCall went on a fishing trip on a portion of the Snake River that acts as border between Idaho and Oregon. At the time, under the Oregon Constitution, the Senate President became acting governor when the governor was out of state. Whenever McCall's group camped for the night on the Idaho side, Oregon Senate President John Burns, a Democrat, became acting governor. Partisan executive control of the state changed eight times during the trip. The incident led to voters approving a 1972 ballot measure restoring the line of succession that existed prior to 1920, with the Secretary of State assuming the office when the governor left the state, died, or resigned.

=== The Oregon Story and the Third Force ===
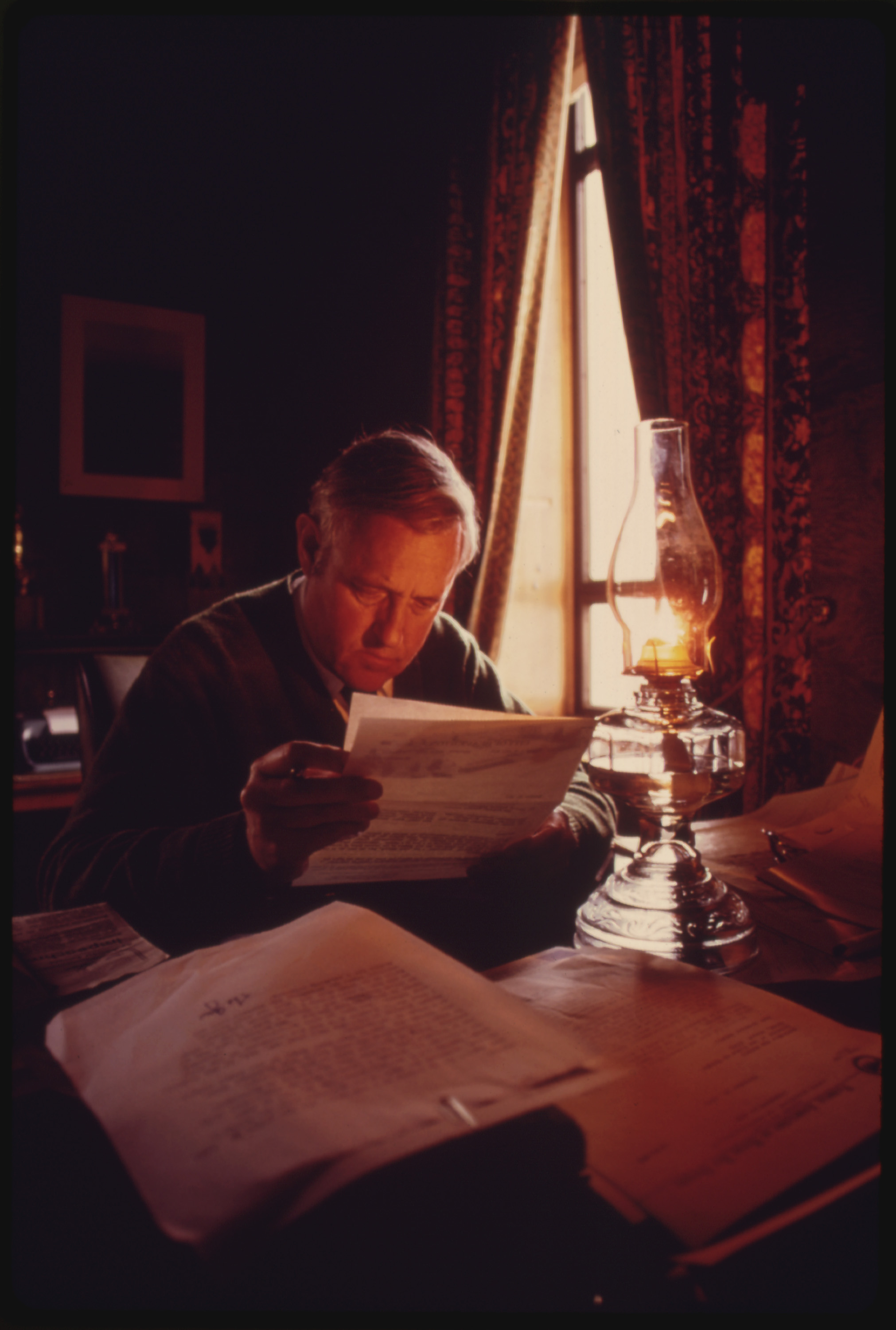
Governor McCall reads by kerosene lamp to draw attention to the energy crisis, 1973

During the summer of 1973, Oregon began to suffer from energy shortages, several months before the rest of the United States was affected by the OPEC oil embargo. The state's power grid was heavily reliant on hydroelectricity and an unusually dry winter had left reservoir levels critically low. McCall's administration took action to encourage energy conservation by lowering speed limits, reducing government energy consumption, and ordering the cessation of all business display lighting. The governor and his aides were not certain whether the latter was legal, but Oregonians generally complied, and McCall later reflected that he had tapped into his constituents' mood: "People wouldn’t believe there was a crisis with the Golden Arches blazing away [...] People are fed up with garishness. They feel assaulted by blinking, flashing, rotating, ostentatious waste." In early 1974, Oregon became the first state in America to implement an odd–even gasoline rationing program to control demand amidst shortages.

As the oil shock began to affect the rest of the country, Oregon's conservation methods seemed prescient, and the state's leaders were applauded by national media. Taking advantage of the attention, McCall launched a national tour to promote the reforms he'd overseen as an inspiration for other states to follow, referring to the package as the "Oregon Story." He characterized himself as representing a "Third Force" of political independents opposed to the establishment - a popular position during the unfolding Watergate scandal. McCall was talked up in the media as a potential candidate for president, and later recalled that leading political figures such as Clare Boothe Luce and Eugene McCarthy had encouraged him to mount a third-party bid for the office. Biographer Brent Walth doubts that McCall was ever serious about making the Third Force a third party or running for president, and believes that he was simply enjoying the spotlight and using it to promote his political ideas.

=== Later life and death ===
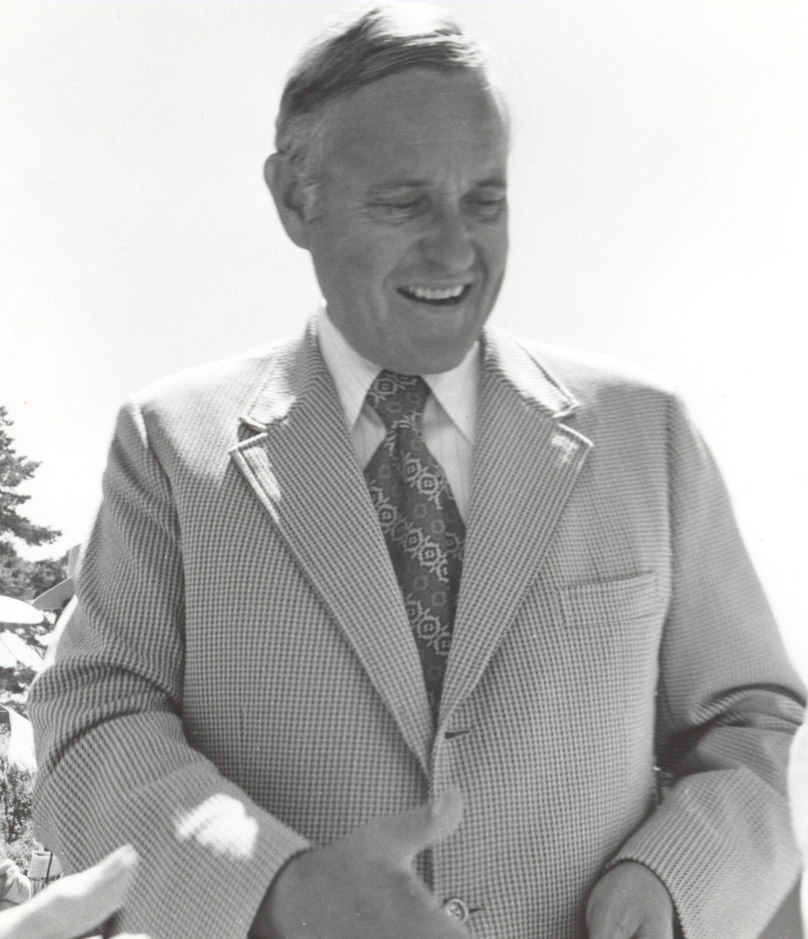
Governor McCall visiting the Siuslaw National Forest

Although his popularity was at its peak, Oregon's constitution prevented McCall from seeking a third consecutive term as governor in 1974. State Senator Vic Atiyeh won the Republican nomination, but lost the general election to Straub, who McCall had endorsed in the election. McCall returned to journalism, writing a newspaper column and serving as commentator for Portland television station KATU. He sought to return to the governorship in 1978, but Atiyeh defeated McCall in the primary and went on to beat Straub in a rematch of their 1974 race.

McCall's prostate cancer eventually returned. He devoted his last years to defending the land-use laws he'd sponsored, which had been under attack from critics since their enaction. In 1982, opponents of land-use planning successfully placed Measure 6, which would have repealed the 1973 law, on the ballot. During his campaign against Measure 6 McCall said, "You all know I have terminal cancer—and I have a lot of it. But what you may not know is that stress induces its spread and induces its activity. Stress may even bring it on. Yet stress is the fuel of the activist. This activist loves Oregon more than he loves life. I know I can't have both very long. The trade-offs are all right with me. But if the legacy we helped give Oregon and which made it twinkle from afar—if it goes, then I guess I wouldn't want to live in Oregon anyhow." Measure 6 ultimately failed to pass.

McCall was admitted to Good Samaritan Hospital in Portland just over a month after the election. He died there at 69 on January 8, 1983.

== Legacy ==
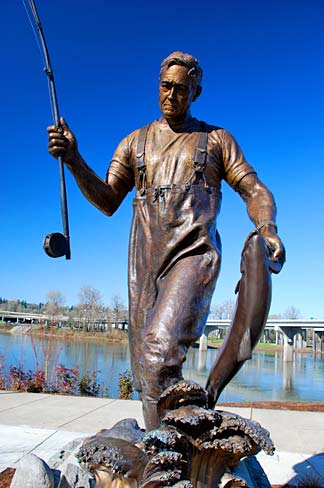
A statue of McCall at Riverfront Park in Salem.

In 1968, Governor McCall created the Harbor Drive Task Force to come up with proposals to replace the riverfront highway with a public space. The 37-acre (150,000 m^{2}) Waterfront Park was built in 1974, running along the Willamette River for the length of downtown Portland. McCall was honored after his death when the park was renamed Tom McCall Waterfront Park in 1984.

McCall was a leading figure in passing the Oregon Beach Bill to declare Oregon shores public land in 1967.

In 1969, McCall played a major role in the founding of SOLV, an environmental non-profit organization whose goal is to "build community through volunteer action to preserve this treasure called Oregon."

The Tom McCall Forum, which pairs prominent speakers with opposing political viewpoints, is presented annually by Pacific University.

The Nature Conservancy named a nature preserve in Wasco County, Oregon after McCall.

Oregon schools that have been named for him include: Tom McCall East Upper Elementary School in Forest Grove and Tom McCall Elementary School in Redmond.

In 1998 McCall was inducted into the Hall of Achievement at University of Oregon's School of Journalism.

On October 10, 2006, the Salem Statesman Journal announced plans by a "committee of citizens" to fund and place the life-size bronze statue of the late governor pictured above in Salem's Riverfront Park.

On March 30, 2015, Oregon Governor Kate Brown, a Democrat, signed SB333, which "designates March 22 of each year as Tom McCall Day to commemorate Governor McCall and encourage school districts to educate children about Governor McCall's legacy." The measure took effect January 1, 2016.

== Marriage ==
While both were working in Moscow in February 1939, McCall met Audrey Owen of Spokane, and they married three months later on May 20, 1939. They had two sons, Samuel Walker McCall III and Thomas "Tad" McCall, an environmental consultant.

== See also ==
- Land use in Oregon
- 1000 Friends of Oregon, an organization established in 1975 by McCall

Political offices
Preceded by Howell Appling	Secretary of State of Oregon; 1965–1967	Succeeded by Clay Myers
Preceded by Mark Hatfield	Governor of Oregon; 1967–1975	Succeeded by Robert W. Straub
Party political offices
Preceded by Mark Hatfield	Republican nominee for Governor of Oregon; 1966, 1970	Succeeded by Victor G. Atiyeh
