= 2012 Arizona Republican presidential primary =

- February 28, 2012

29 delegates to the 2012 Republican National Convention
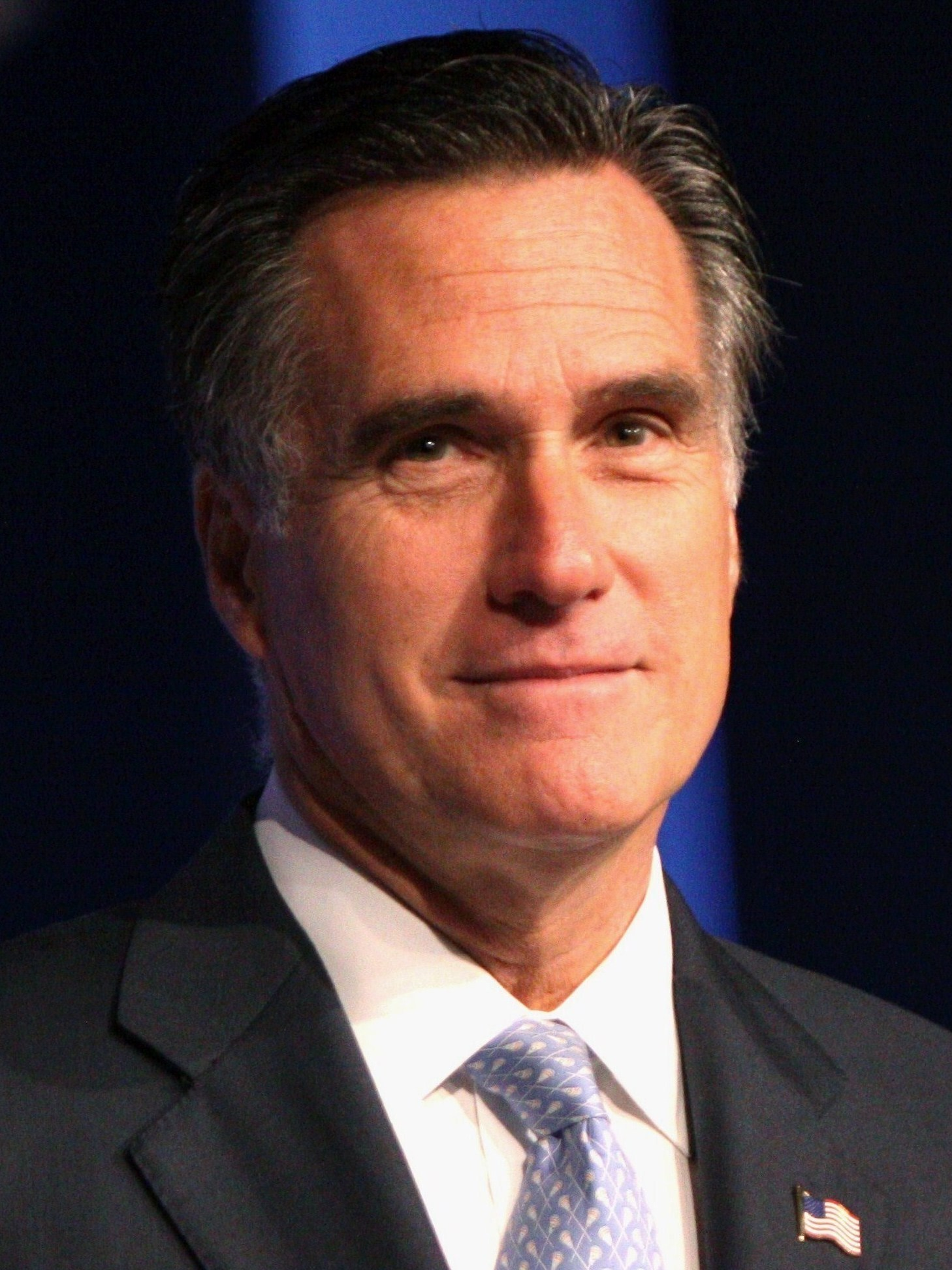

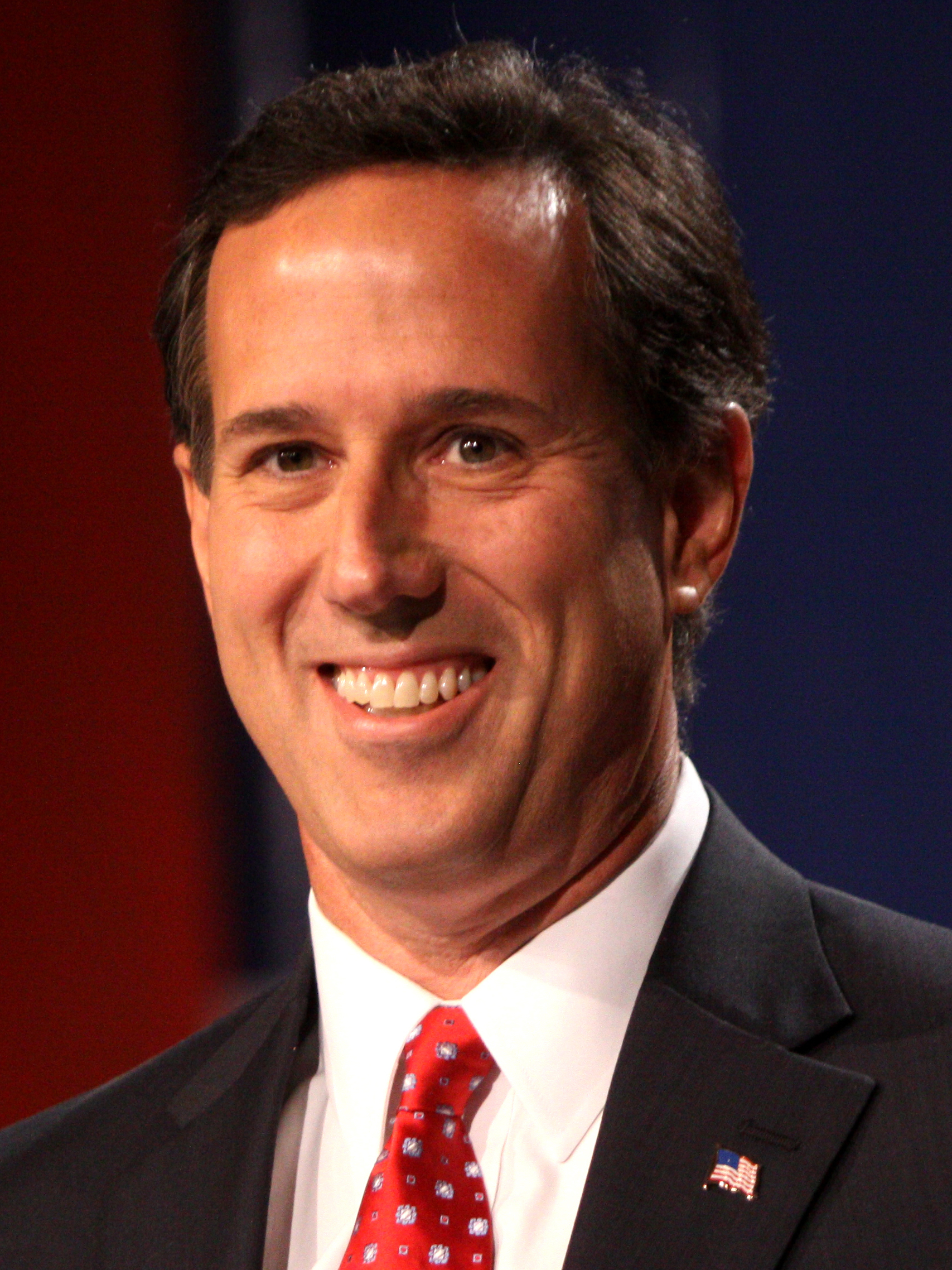

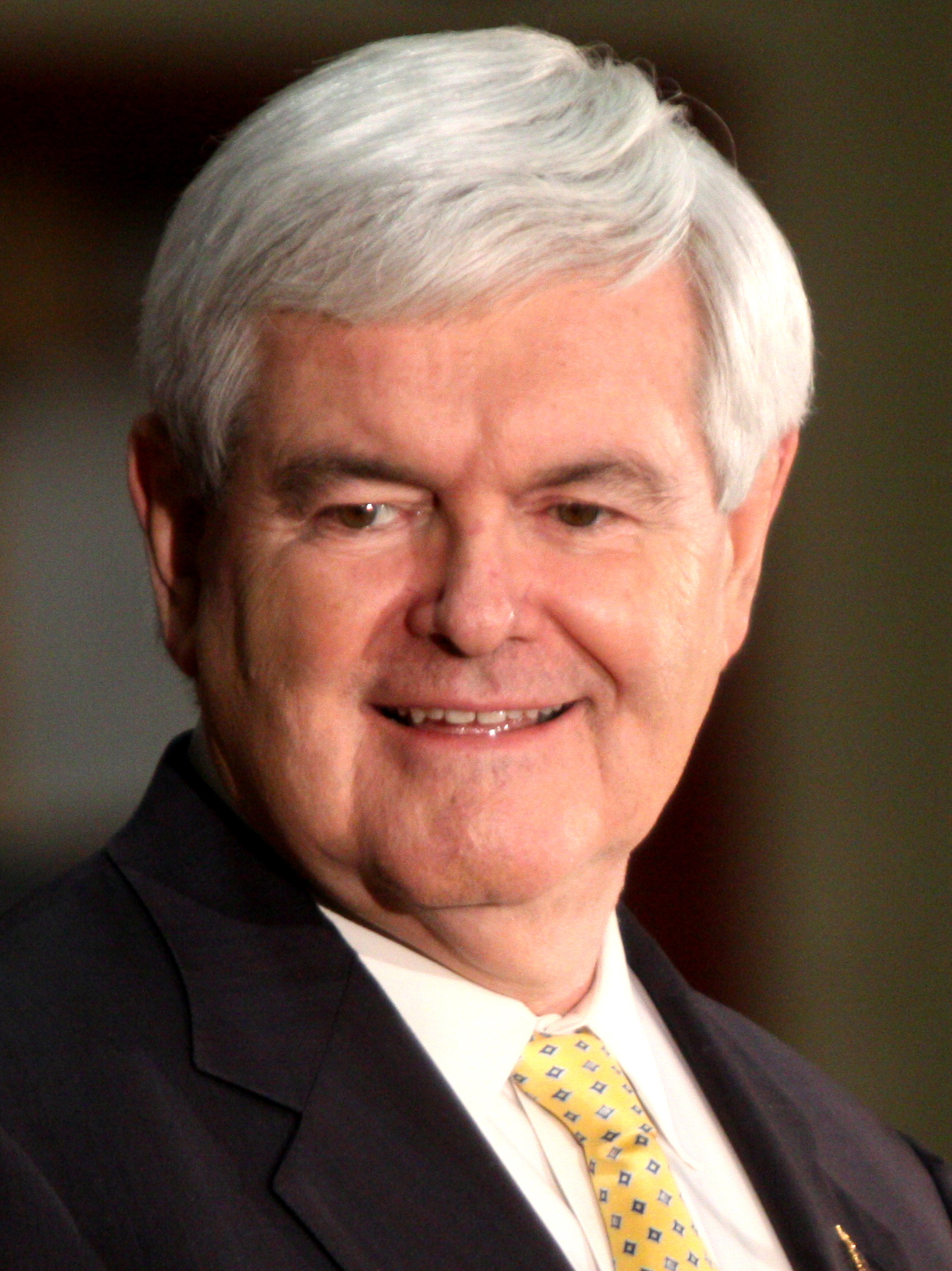

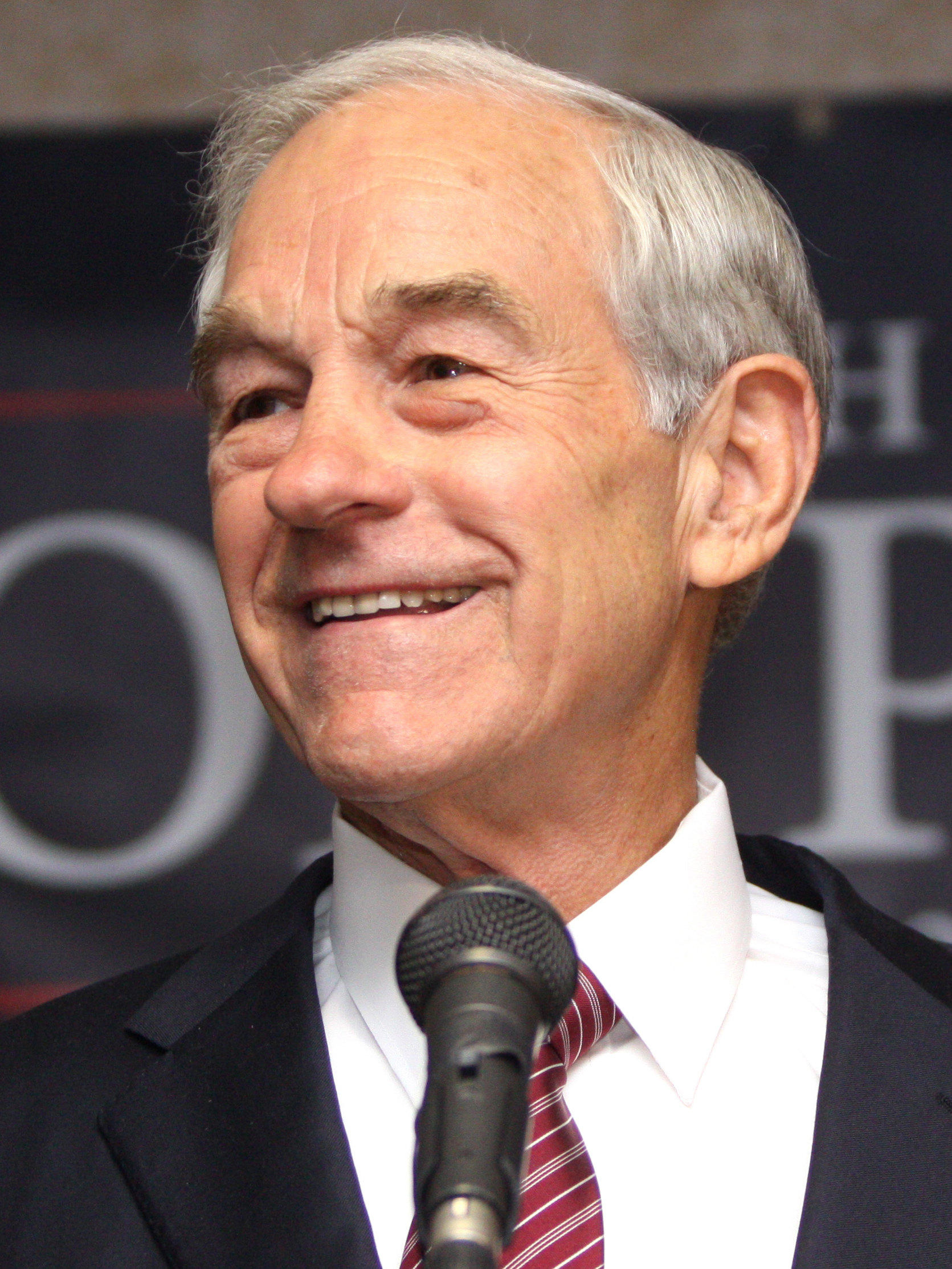
Candidate	Mitt Romney	Rick Santorum
Home state	Massachusetts	Pennsylvania
Delegate count	29	0
Popular vote	239,167	138,031
Percentage	46.87%	27.05%
Candidate	Newt Gingrich	Ron Paul
Home state	Georgia	Texas
Delegate count	0	0
Popular vote	81,748	43,952
Percentage	16.02%	8.61%
- Primary results by county Mitt Romney

The 2012 Arizona Republican presidential primary was a closed primary that took place on February 28, 2012. More than 1,130,000 registered Republican voters participated in the event, the purpose of which was to select delegates from the state to attend the Republican National Convention on behalf of candidates for the Republican presidential nomination. The Republican National Committee removed half of Arizona's delegate allocation because the state committee moved its Republican primary before March 6. Arizona therefore held a ballot to select 29 proportionally-allocated delegates. This election occurred the same day as the Michigan Republican primary. The Arizona primary was set as a winner-take-all contest, another violation of RNC delegate allocation rules, which require proportional allocation for all primaries held before April 1. Endorsements from 2008 primary rival and U.S. Senator John McCain and Governor Jan Brewer helped add to the prospects of a victory for Romney in Arizona.

== Campaign ==
Former Massachusetts Governor Mitt Romney, Texas Congressman Ron Paul, former Louisiana Governor Buddy Roemer, former Speaker of the House Newt Gingrich, and former Pennsylvania Senator Rick Santorum were contesting and campaigning in the Arizona primary.

Televised debates in Arizona were held on February 18 and 19, 2012, on Public-access television and February 22, 2012, on CNN. Only the major Republican candidates, except for Roemer, were invited to the third, and none of them attended the first two.

Twenty-three candidates appeared on the presidential primary ballot, 11 of whom are residents of the state.

=== Project White House ===
The small alternative newspaper Tucson Weekly, for the second election in a row, has sponsored an event called "Project White House" in which it gets as many ordinary citizens on the ballot as it possibly can. Afterward, a series of "reality show style" competitions occurred, including candidate meet-and-greets, and two televised debates which were sponsored by the Tucson Weekly, a local public-access television show called Illegal Knowledge, and local public television stations.

The two debates took place on February 18 and February 19, 2012, both were commercial-free, one hour long each, and both aired on Access Tucson while they were streamed live on the internet. Both debates were produced in conjunction with Project White House and Jim Nintzel of the Tucson Weekly.

The first debate, held on the 18th at 8 pm MST, produced by Illegal Knowledge and hosted by Dave Maass of San Diego CityBeat, had nine participants, composed of eight lesser known Republican candidates (Donald Benjamin, Simon Bollander, Cesar Cisneros, Kip Dean, Sarah Gonzales, Al "Dick" Perry, Charles Skelley and Jim Terr) and one Green Party candidate (Michael Oatman). A press release regarding this first debate was distributed which invited all candidates listed on either Republican or Green Party ballots in Arizona to the first debate, although none of the major Republican or Green Party candidates appeared.

The second debate, held on the 19th at 7pm MST, produced by Access Tucson and hosted by both Dave Maass of San Diego CityBeat and Amanda Hurley of the University of Arizona School of Journalism, was restricted only to Republican candidates and featured seven of the eight lesser known Republican candidates from the previous night (less Cesar Cisneros).

There was a third Arizona debate which took place in Mesa, AZ on February 22, 2012, but was not associated with Project White House and had only invited the four major Republican candidates to participate.

Two lesser known candidates appearing in the first debates, Sarah Gonzales (who placed sixth) and Michael Oatman (who placed tied for third), placed ahead of their better known Republican and Green Party counterparts (Buddy Roemer and Gerard Davis respectively) in the Arizona Presidential Preference Election Results from February 28, 2012.

== Results ==
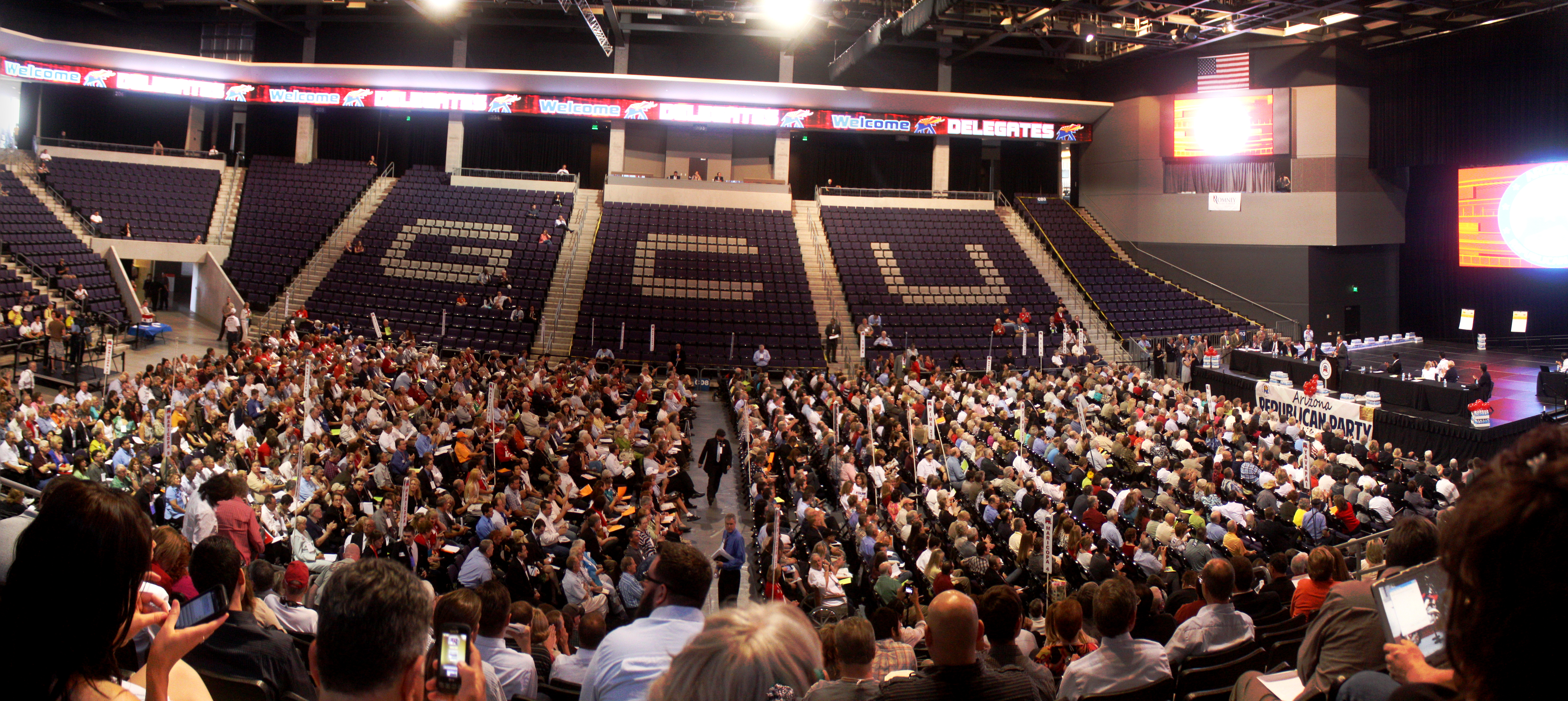
The 2012 Arizona Republican state convention, which determined delegates who would be sent to the RNC.

Arizona was allocated 29 delegates because it moved its primary to February 28.

Voter turnout = 45.3%

Arizona Republican primary, 2012
Candidate	Votes	Percentage	Delegates
Mitt Romney	239,167	46.87%	26
Rick Santorum	138,031	27.05%	0
Newt Gingrich	81,748	16.02%	0
Ron Paul	43,952	8.61%	3
Rick Perry (withdrawn)	2,023	0.40%	0
Sarah Gonzales	1,544	0.30%	0
Buddy Roemer (withdrawn)	692	0.14%	0
Paul Sims	530	0.10%	0
Cesar Cisneros	418	0.08%	0
Mark Callahan	358	0.07%	0
Al "Dick" Perry	310	0.06%	0
Donald Benjamin	223	0.04%	0
Michael Levinson	217	0.04%	0
Kip Dean	198	0.04%	0
Ronald Zack	156	0.03%	0
Christopher Hill	139	0.03%	0
Frank Lynch	110	0.02%	0
Wayne Charles Arnett	96	0.02%	0
Raymond Scott Perkins	90	0.02%	0
Matt Welch	86	0.02%	0
Jim Terr	59	0.01%	0
Charles Skelley	57	0.01%	0
Simon Bollander	54	0.01%	0
Total:	510,258	100.00%	29
