= 2024 Oregon Secretary of State election =

- November 5, 2024

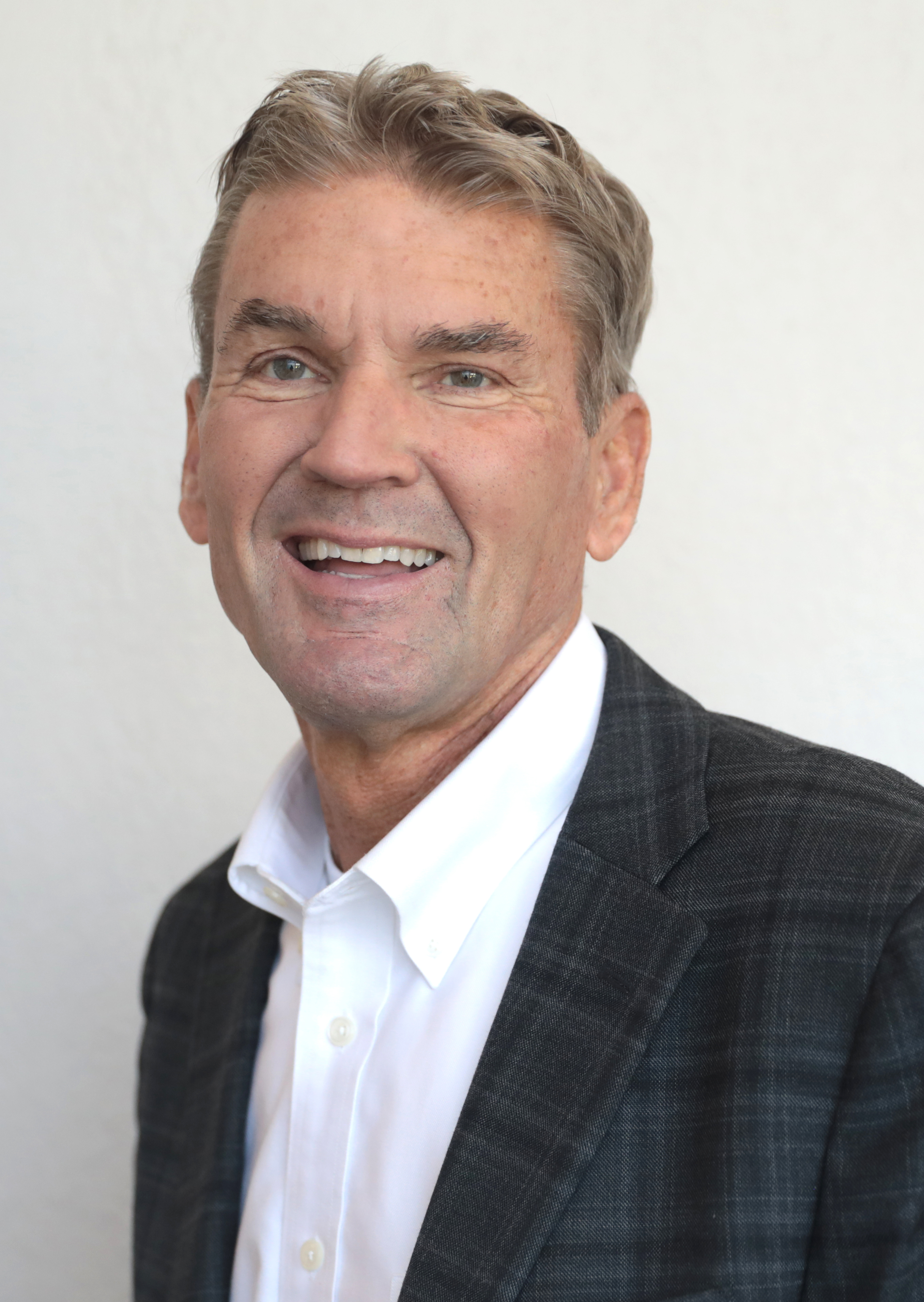
| Nominee | Tobias Read | Dennis Linthicum |
| Party | Democratic | Republican |
| Popular vote | 1,166,447 | 897,704 |
| Percentage | 54.45% | 41.90% |
- Read: 40–50% 50–60% 60–70% 70–80% 80–90% >90% Linthicum: 40–50% 50–60% 60–70% 70–80% 80–90% >90% Tie: 40–50% 50% No votes
Secretary of State before election
LaVonne Griffin-Valade
Democratic
Elected Secretary of State
Tobias Read
Democratic

The 2024 Oregon Secretary of State election was held on November 5, 2024, to elect the Oregon secretary of state, the highest office in the state after the governor. Incumbent Democrat LaVonne Griffin-Valade was appointed by Governor Tina Kotek to replace Shemia Fagan, who resigned in May 2023 after revelations that she took a consulting job at a cannabis company while her office was auditing Oregon's marijuana industry, which many considered to be a conflict of interest. Griffin-Valade did not seek election to a full term.

Primary elections took place May 21, 2024. Democratic nominee Tobias Read won the general election on November 5, 2024.

== Democratic primary ==
=== Candidates ===
==== Nominee ====
- Tobias Read, Oregon state treasurer (2017–present)

==== Eliminated in primary ====
- Jim Crary, attorney and candidate for Oregon's 2nd congressional district in 2016 and 2018
- James Manning Jr., president pro tempore of the Oregon Senate (2021–present) from the 7th district (2016–present)
- Dave Stauffer, attorney and perennial candidate
- Paul Damian Wells, machinist and candidate for secretary of state in 2012 and 2016

==== Declined ====
- LaVonne Griffin-Valade, incumbent secretary of state (2023–present)

=== Endorsements ===
James Manning Jr.

Newspapers

- The Skanner
Tobias Read

Labor unions

- Oregon Education Association

Newspapers

- Eugene Weekly
- The Oregonian
- Willamette Week
- Portland Mercury

=== Forum ===
2024 Oregon Secretary of State election Democratic primary candidate forum
| No. | Date | Host | Moderator | Link | Democratic | Democratic | Democratic | Democratic |
| Key: P Participant A Absent N Not invited I Invited W Withdrawn | | | | | | | | |
| Key: P Participant A Absent N Not invited I Invited W Withdrawn | | | | | Jim Crary | James Manning Jr. | Tobias Read | David Stauffer |
|---|---|---|---|---|---|---|---|---|
| 1 | Apr. 9, 2024 | City Club of Central Oregon; City Club of Eugene; City Club of Portland; League of Women Voters of Deschutes County | Tim Trainor | YouTube | P | P | P | P |

=== Results ===
Results by county Read: 50–60%; 60–70%; 70–80%

Democratic primary results
| Party | Candidate | Votes | % |
|---|---|---|---|
| Democratic | Tobias Read | 303,089 | 69.40% |
| Democratic | James Manning Jr. | 97,427 | 22.31% |
| Democratic | Jim Crary | 16,340 | 3.74% |
| Democratic | Paul Damian Wells | 9,425 | 2.16% |
| Democratic | Dave Stauffer | 7,921 | 1.81% |
| Write-in | | 2,515 | 0.58% |
| Total votes | | 436,717 | 100.00% |

== Republican primary ==
=== Candidates ===
==== Nominee ====
- Dennis Linthicum, state senator from the 28th district (2017–present)

==== Eliminated in primary ====
- Brent Barker, property broker and candidate for Commissioner of Labor in 2022
- Tim McCloud, market analyst and candidate for governor in 2022

=== Endorsements ===
Dennis Linthicum

Newspapers

- Willamette Week
Declined to endorse

Newspapers

- The Oregonian

=== Forum ===
2024 Oregon Secretary of State election Republican primary candidate forum
| No. | Date | Host | Moderator | Link | Republican | Republican | Republican |
| Key: P Participant A Absent N Not invited I Invited W Withdrawn | | | | | | | |
| Key: P Participant A Absent N Not invited I Invited W Withdrawn | | | | | Brent Barker | Dennis Linthicum | Tim McCloud |
|---|---|---|---|---|---|---|---|
| 1 | Apr. 9, 2024 | City Club of Central Oregon; City Club of Eugene; City Club of Portland; League of Women Voters of Deschutes County | Tim Trainor | YouTube | I | P | P |

=== Results ===
Results by county Linthicum: 50–60%; 60–70%; 70–80%

Republican primary results
| Party | Candidate | Votes | % |
|---|---|---|---|
| Republican | Dennis Linthicum | 199,243 | 65.99% |
| Republican | Brent Barker | 61,011 | 20.21% |
| Republican | Tim McCloud | 39,109 | 12.95% |
| Write-in | | 2,560 | 0.85% |
| Total votes | | 301,923 | 100.00% |

== General election ==
=== Predictions ===
| Source | Ranking | As of |
|---|---|---|
| Sabato's Crystal Ball | Safe D | July 25, 2024 |

=== Endorsements ===
Tobias Reed (D)

Newspapers

- The Oregonian
- Willamette Week

=== Polling ===
| Poll source | Date(s) administered | Sample size (Note: Key: A – all adults RV – registered voters LV – likely voters V – unclear) | Margin of error | Tobias Read Democratic | Dennis Linthicum Republican | Nathalie Paravicini Pacific Green | Undecided |
|---|---|---|---|---|---|---|---|
| Public Policy Polling (D) (Note: This poll was sponsored by the Northwest Progressive Institute) | October 16–17, 2024 | 716 (LV) | ± 3.7% | 44% | 38% | 3% | 15% |

=== Results ===
2024 Oregon Secretary of State election
| Party | Candidate | Votes | % | ±% |
|---|---|---|---|---|
| Democratic | Tobias Read | 1,166,447 | 54.45% | +4.14% |
| Republican | Dennis Linthicum | 897,704 | 41.90% | –1.31% |
| Pacific Green | Nathalie Paravicini | 76,170 | 3.56% | –0.05% |
| Write-in | | 2,011 | 0.09% | –0.01% |
| Total votes | | 2,142,332 | 100.00% | N/A |
| Democratic hold | | | | |

==== By county ====
| County | Tobias Read Democratic | | Dennis Linthicum Republican | | Various candidates Other parties | | Margin | | Total |
| County | # | % | # | % | # | % | # | % | Total |
|---|---|---|---|---|---|---|---|---|---|
| Baker | 2,236 | 23.90% | 6,927 | 74.05% | 192 | 2.05% | -4,691 | -50.14% | 9,355 |
| Benton | 31,638 | 65.15% | 14,747 | 30.37% | 2,177 | 4.48% | 16,891 | 34.78% | 48,562 |
| Clackamas | 121,956 | 52.30% | 104,379 | 44.77% | 6,832 | 2.93% | 17,577 | 7.54% | 233,167 |
| Clatsop | 11,742 | 52.87% | 9,528 | 42.90% | 940 | 4.23% | 2,214 | 9.97% | 22,210 |
| Columbia | 12,448 | 41.53% | 16,428 | 54.81% | 1,097 | 3.66% | -3,980 | -13.28% | 29,973 |
| Coos | 13,586 | 39.60% | 19,833 | 57.81% | 888 | 2.59% | -6,247 | -18.21% | 34,307 |
| Crook | 3,743 | 23.89% | 11,623 | 74.18% | 302 | 1.93% | -7,880 | -50.29% | 15,668 |
| Curry | 5,520 | 40.67% | 7,722 | 56.90% | 330 | 2.43% | -2,202 | -16.22% | 13,572 |
| Deschutes | 64,659 | 52.79% | 54,391 | 44.41% | 3,428 | 2.80% | 10,268 | 8.38% | 122,478 |
| Douglas | 18,412 | 30.86% | 39,888 | 66.86% | 1,359 | 2.28% | -21,476 | -36.00% | 59,659 |
| Gilliam | 299 | 27.48% | 759 | 69.76% | 30 | 2.76% | -460 | -42.28% | 1,088 |
| Grant | 821 | 19.44% | 3,345 | 79.19% | 58 | 1.37% | -2,524 | -59.75% | 4,224 |
| Harney | 811 | 20.25% | 3,089 | 77.15% | 104 | 2.60% | -2,278 | -56.89% | 4,004 |
| Hood River | 7,703 | 63.83% | 3,897 | 32.29% | 468 | 3.88% | 3,806 | 31.54% | 12,068 |
| Jackson | 50,777 | 44.34% | 60,346 | 52.69% | 3,397 | 2.97% | -9,569 | -8.36% | 114,520 |
| Jefferson | 3,808 | 33.81% | 7,188 | 63.81% | 268 | 2.38% | -3,380 | -30.01% | 11,264 |
| Josephine | 15,928 | 33.83% | 29,797 | 63.29% | 1,353 | 2.87% | -13,869 | -29.46% | 47,078 |
| Klamath | 9,459 | 27.75% | 23,847 | 69.97% | 776 | 2.28% | -14,388 | -42.22% | 34,082 |
| Lake | 668 | 16.30% | 3,349 | 81.72% | 81 | 1.98% | -2,681 | -65.42% | 4,098 |
| Lane | 118,707 | 59.23% | 74,194 | 37.02% | 7,505 | 3.74% | 44,513 | 22.21% | 200,406 |
| Lincoln | 16,401 | 57.17% | 11,319 | 39.45% | 970 | 3.38% | 5,082 | 17.71% | 28,690 |
| Linn | 25,010 | 36.78% | 40,826 | 60.04% | 2,165 | 3.18% | -15,816 | -23.26% | 68,001 |
| Malheur | 2,728 | 25.81% | 7,593 | 71.84% | 249 | 2.36% | -4,865 | -46.03% | 10,570 |
| Marion | 70,749 | 47.04% | 74,418 | 49.48% | 5,229 | 3.48% | -3,669 | -2.44% | 150,396 |
| Morrow | 1,115 | 24.65% | 3,267 | 72.23% | 141 | 3.12% | -2,152 | -47.58% | 4,523 |
| Multnomah | 304,602 | 77.15% | 70,473 | 17.85% | 19,745 | 5.00% | 234,129 | 59.30% | 394,820 |
| Polk | 20,997 | 45.76% | 23,331 | 50.84% | 1,560 | 3.40% | -2,334 | -5.09% | 45,888 |
| Sherman | 229 | 20.46% | 871 | 77.84% | 19 | 1.70% | -642 | -57.37% | 1,119 |
| Tillamook | 7,421 | 47.70% | 7,624 | 49.00% | 513 | 3.30% | -203 | -1.30% | 15,558 |
| Umatilla | 8,781 | 29.63% | 20,078 | 67.76% | 774 | 2.61% | -11,297 | -38.12% | 29,633 |
| Union | 4,002 | 28.77% | 9,597 | 69.00% | 309 | 2.22% | -5,595 | -40.23% | 13,908 |
| Wallowa | 1,450 | 29.61% | 3,311 | 67.61% | 136 | 2.78% | -1,861 | -38.00% | 4,897 |
| Wasco | 5,616 | 44.48% | 6,560 | 51.96% | 450 | 3.56% | -944 | -7.48% | 12,626 |
| Washington | 177,258 | 62.51% | 93,714 | 33.05% | 12,599 | 4.44% | 83,544 | 29.46% | 283,571 |
| Wheeler | 210 | 25.09% | 603 | 72.04% | 24 | 2.87% | -393 | -46.95% | 837 |
| Yamhill | 24,957 | 44.96% | 28,842 | 51.96% | 1,713 | 3.09% | -3,885 | -7.00% | 55,512 |
| Totals | 1,166,447 | 54.45% | 897,704 | 41.90% | 78,181 | 3.65% | 268,743 | 12.54% | 2,142,332 |

Counties that flipped from Republican to Democratic

- Deschutes (largest city: Bend)

==== By congressional district ====
Read won five of six congressional districts.

| District | Read | Linthicum | Representative |
|---|---|---|---|
| 1st | 64% | 31% | Suzanne Bonamici |
| 2nd | 35% | 63% | Cliff Bentz |
| 3rd | 70% | 26% | Earl Blumenauer (118th Congress) |
| 3rd | 70% | 26% | Maxine Dexter (119th Congress) |
| 4th | 54% | 43% | Val Hoyle |
| 5th | 52% | 45% | Lori Chavez-DeRemer (118th Congress) |
| 5th | 52% | 45% | Janelle Bynum (119th Congress) |
| 6th | 53% | 44% | Andrea Salinas |

== Notes ==
Partisan clients
