= Nancy Nathanson =

American politician

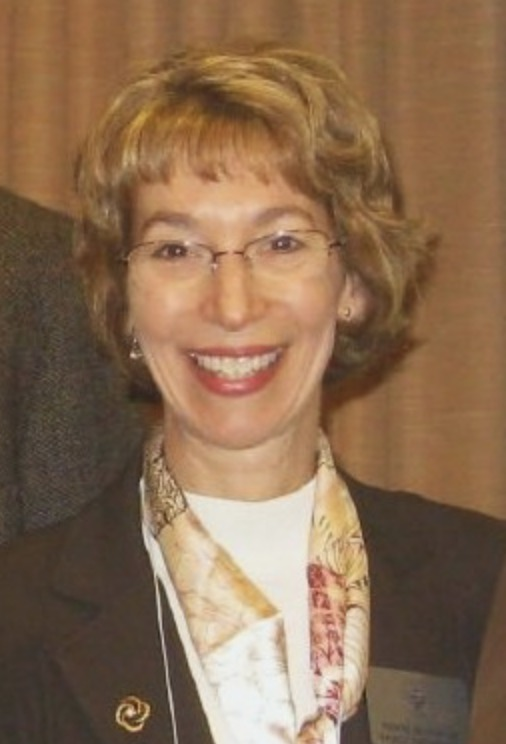

Member of the Oregon House of Representatives from the 13th district
- Incumbent
- Assumed office 2006
- Preceded by: Robert Ackerman

Member of Eugene City Council from the 8th Ward
- In office 1993–2004
- Preceded by: Roger Rutan
- Succeeded by: Chris Pryor

Personal details
- Born: September 29, 1951 (age 75) Dallas, Texas, U.S.
- Party: Democratic
- Spouse: Steve Robinson
- Education: Northwestern University; University of Oregon (BS)
- Profession: Supervisor

Nancy Louise Nathanson (born September 29, 1951 in Dallas, Texas) is a Democratic member of the Oregon House of Representatives, representing the 13th district. Nathanson attended Northwestern University, and later the University of Oregon where she received a Bachelor of Science in urban geography.

== Political career ==
=== Eugene City Council ===
In 1992, Nathanson was elected to the Eugene City Council, succeeding Roger Rutan in Ward 8. During her time on the council, Nathanson received multiple awards including; the "Outstanding Elected Official Award," presented by the Lane Council of Governments in 2001; the "James C. Richards Memorial Award," presented by the League of Oregon Cities in 2004; and the "Wetlands Appreciation Award" presented by the Wetland Executive Team in 2005. Nathanson ran for Mayor of Eugene in 2004, but lost in the primary election to her opponent, and former mayor Kitty Piercy.

=== Oregon House of Representatives ===
In 2006, Nathanson was elected to her first term in the Oregon House of Representatives, defeating the Republican candidate Monica Johnson. According to The Oregonian, Nathanson votes with Democrats 98.68% of the time, and misses votes 0.66% of the time.

==== Endorsements ====
According to Nathanson, she is endorsed by multiple organizations including the Oregon AFL-CIO, Planned Parenthood, the Amalgamated Transit Union, Basic Rights Oregon, the American Federation of Teachers, the United Transportation Union, and Stand for Children.

==== Committee assignments ====
- House Interim Committee On Revenue - Chair
- Joint Committee On Information Management and Technology - Co-Chair
- Joint Committee On Transportation
- Joint Interim Committee On Ways and Means Subcommittee On Capital Construction
- House Interim Committee On Transportation

== Personal ==
Nathanson resides in Eugene, Oregon, with her husband Steve Robinson. Nathanson moved to Eugene in 1973. She attended Hillcrest High School in Dallas, Texas.

Nathanson was employed at academic libraries in Oregon and Washington (including the University of Oregon), where she held library supervisory and technical jobs. She also owned and operated an entrepreneurial small business called Photoscapes. She was also a tap dance instructor in Eugene for several years.

== Electoral history ==
2006 Oregon State Representative, 13th district
Party	Candidate	Votes	%
Democratic	Nancy Nathanson	17,505	72.3
Republican	Monica Johnson	6,622	27.4
Write-in		73	0.3
Total votes		24,200	100%

2008 Oregon State Representative, 13th district
Party	Candidate	Votes	%
Democratic	Nancy Nathanson	22,899	97.4
Write-in		618	2.6
Total votes		23,517	100%

2010 Oregon State Representative, 13th district
Party	Candidate	Votes	%
Democratic	Nancy Nathanson	15,967	64.8
Republican	Bill Young	7,890	32.0
Pacific Green	Mark Callahan	749	3.0
Write-in		40	0.2
Total votes		24,646	100%

2012 Oregon State Representative, 13th district
Party	Candidate	Votes	%
Democratic	Nancy Nathanson	19,110	68.7
Republican	Mark Callahan	8,651	31.1
Write-in		56	0.2
Total votes		27,817	100%

2014 Oregon State Representative, 13th district
Party	Candidate	Votes	%
Democratic	Nancy Nathanson	16,854	69.2
Republican	Laura D Cooper	7,408	30.4
Write-in		104	0.4
Total votes		24,366	100%

2016 Oregon State Representative, 13th district
Party	Candidate	Votes	%
Democratic	Nancy Nathanson	21,648	66.3
Republican	Laura D Cooper	9,879	30.3
Libertarian	Christopher Tsekouras	1,052	3.2
Write-in		71	0.2
Total votes		32,650	100%

2018 Oregon State Representative, 13th district
Party	Candidate	Votes	%
Democratic	Nancy Nathanson	21,387	96.7
Write-in		725	3.3
Total votes		22,112	100%

2020 Oregon State Representative, 13th district
Party	Candidate	Votes	%
Democratic	Nancy Nathanson	27,723	70.6
Republican	David J Smith	11,488	29.3
Write-in		54	0.1
Total votes		39,265	100%

2022 Oregon State Representative, 13th district
Party	Candidate	Votes	%
Democratic	Nancy Nathanson	23,543	65.2
Republican	Timothy S Sutherland	12,501	34.6
Write-in		59	0.2
Total votes		36,103	100%

2024 Oregon State Representative, 13th district
Party	Candidate	Votes	%
Democratic	Nancy Nathanson	27,143	66.5
Republican	Timothy S Sutherland	13,630	33.4
Write-in		52	0.1
Total votes		40,825	100%
