= Senator Brownell =

Senator Brownell may refer to:

- Chauncey W. Brownell (1847–1938), Vermont State Senate
- George C. Brownell (1858–1921), Oregon State Senate
- Peter Brownell (born 1948), Vermont State Senate
