= Ruth Bascom =

American mayor

Mayor of Eugene
- In office 1993–1996
- Preceded by: Jeffrey Miller
- Succeeded by: Jim Torrey

Personal details
- Born: February 4, 1926 Ames, Iowa, U.S.
- Died: August 26, 2010 (aged 84) Springfield, Oregon, U.S.
- Spouse: John U. Bascom
- Children: 6

Ruth Ellen Bascom (née Fenton; February 4, 1926 – August 26, 2010) was an American politician who served as the first female mayor of Eugene, Oregon, from 1993 until 1996.

== Early life ==
Bascom was born Ruth Ellen Fenton in Ames, Iowa, the daughter of two university professors. She was raised in Manhattan, Kansas.

== Career ==
As mayor, Bascom worked to revitalize downtown Eugene, removing a fountain that blocked traffic on Broadway and Willamette streets and creating bicycle and pedestrian paths. The Riverbank Trail System, which extends for twelve miles through the city along the Willamette River, is named for her.

== Personal life ==
Bascom met her future husband, John U. Bascom, when the two were sixth-graders. The couple moved to Eugene in 1960 and had six children.

On August 15, 2010, Bascom was the passenger of a car driven by her husband, John Bascom. John reportedly fell asleep at the wheel and struck several trees and large boulders on U.S. Route 395 near Burns, Oregon. Ruth Bascom suffered major injuries in the accident and was hospitalized.

Ruth Bascom died from a stroke and injuries sustained in the accident on August 26, 2010, at the age of 84.
