= Oregon's 13th House district =

Legislative districts in the state of Oregon

Oregon's 13th House district after redistricting after the 2020 Census

District 13 of the Oregon House of Representatives is one of 60 House legislative districts in the state of Oregon. As of 2021, the boundary for the district is located entirely within Lane County and covers the northern part of Eugene. The current representative for the district is Democrat Nancy Nathanson of Eugene.

== Election results ==
District boundaries have changed over time. Therefore, representatives before 2021 may not represent the same constituency as today. General election results from 2000 to present are as follows:

Year	Candidate	Party	Percent	Opponent	Party	Percent	Opponent	Party	Percent	Write-in percentage
2000	Dan Gardner	Democratic	100.00%	Unopposed						
2002 (Note: Robert Ackerman was the incumbent in this election. He previously represented District 39, but was moved to this district due to redistricting following the 2000 United States census.)	Robert Ackerman	Democratic	73.33%	Greg McNeill	Libertarian	26.64%	No third candidate			0.03%
2004	Robert Ackerman	Democratic	61.21%	Gary Pierpoint	Republican	36.52%	Wayne Williams	Libertarian	2.27%	
2006	Nancy Nathanson	Democratic	72.56%	Monica Johnson	Republican	27.44%	No third candidate			
2008	Nancy Nathanson	Democratic	97.37%	Unopposed						2.63%
2010	Nancy Nathanson	Democratic	64.75%	Bill Young	Republican	32.06%	Mark Callahan	Green	3.03%	0.16%
2012	Nancy Nathanson	Democratic	68.70%	Mark Callahan	Republican	31.10%	No third candidate			0.20%
2014	Nancy Nathanson	Democratic	69.17%	Laura Cooper	Republican	30.40%	No third candidate			0.43%
2016	Nancy Nathanson	Democratic	66.45%	Laura Cooper	Republican	30.32%	Christopher Tsekouras	Libertarian	3.23%	
2018	Nancy Nathanson	Democratic	96.72%	Unopposed						3.28%
2020	Nancy Nathanson	Democratic	70.60%	David J. Smith	Republican	29.18%	No third candidate			0.14%
2022	Nancy Nathanson	Democratic	65.21%	Timothy Sutherland	Republican	34.63%	No third candidate			0.16%
2024	Nancy Nathanson	Democratic	66.5%	Timothy Sutherland	Republican	33.4%	No third candidate			0.1%

== See also ==
- Oregon Legislative Assembly
- Oregon House of Representatives
