= Oregon's 7th Senate district =

American legislative district

Oregon's 7th Senate District as of September 27, 2021

District 7 of the Oregon State Senate comprises parts of northern Lane County in the Eugene metropolitan area. It is composed of Oregon House districts 13 and 14. It is currently represented by Democrat James Manning Jr. of Eugene.

== Election results ==
District boundaries have changed over time. Therefore, senators before 2021 may not represent the same constituency as today. From 1993 until 2003, the district covered parts of southeast Portland; from 2003 until 2013, it covered most land in Lane County from north and west Eugene stretching north to Harrisburg and west to Cheshire; and from 2013 until 2023, it covered a similar area as previously detailed while losing some land from its southwest corner. The current district is similar to the previous iteration with the exception of the loss of Junction City and all previously included territory north of it while extending west to include Elmira and Veneta.

The results are as follows:

Year	Candidate	Party	Percent	Opponent	Party	Percent	Opponent	Party	Percent
1984	Rod Monroe	Democratic	100.0%	Unopposed					
1988	Shirley Gold	Democratic	76.0%	Andrew Nebergall	Republican	23.9%	No third candidate		
1992	Shirley Gold	Democratic	83.4%	Myles Tweete	Libertarian	16.1%	No third candidate		
1996	Kate Brown	Democratic	86.2%	Tom O'Connor	Libertarian	9.1%	Richard Alevizos	Socialist	3.5%
2000	Kate Brown	Democratic	89.9%	Charley Nims	Socialist	8.5%	No third candidate		
2002	Vicki Walker	Democratic	54.3%	Renee Lindsey	Republican	45.7%	No third candidate		
2006	Vicki Walker	Democratic	51.7%	Jim Torrey	Republican	48.3%	No third candidate		
2010	Chris Edwards	Democratic	62.3%	Karen Bodner	Republican	37.2%	No third candidate		
2014	Chris Edwards	Democratic	95.0%	Unopposed					
2018	James Manning Jr.	Democratic	94.5%	Unopposed					
2022	James Manning Jr.	Democratic	64.4%	Raquel Ivie	Republican	35.3%	No third candidate		
