= 2016 United States Senate election in Oregon =

- November 8, 2016
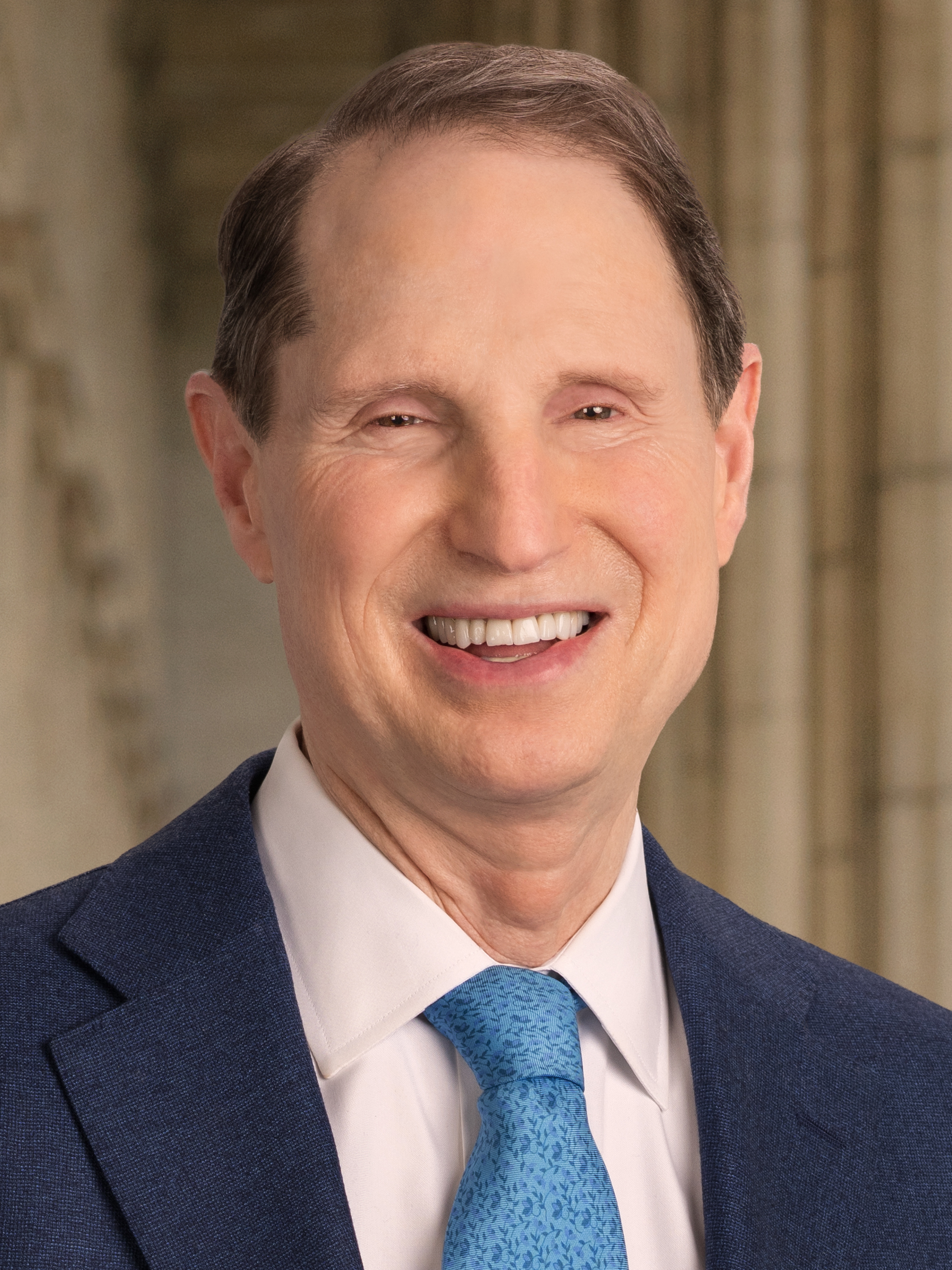

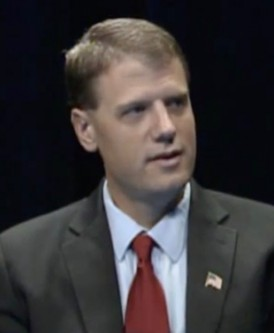
Nominee	Ron Wyden	Mark Callahan
Party	Democratic	Republican
Popular vote	1,105,119	651,106
Percentage	56.60%	33.35%
- Wyden: 40–50% 50–60% 60–70% 70–80% 80–90% >90% Callahan: 40–50% 50–60% 60–70% 70–80% 80–90% >90% Tie: 40–50% 50% No data
U.S. senator before election
Ron Wyden
Democratic
Elected U.S. Senator
Ron Wyden
Democratic

The 2016 United States Senate election in Oregon was held November 8, 2016, to elect a member of the United States Senate to represent the State of Oregon, concurrently with the 2016 U.S. presidential election, as well as other elections to the United States Senate in other states and elections to the United States House of Representatives and various state and local elections.

Incumbent Democratic Senator Ron Wyden was re-elected to a fourth full term in office. This is the first senate election since 1998 in which Coos County has not supported him. This election also marks the most recent time any candidate from either major party swept all of Oregon's existing congressional districts in any statewide election.

== Democratic Party primary ==
=== Candidates ===
==== Declared ====
- Kevin Stine, Medford City Councilor
- Paul Weaver, retired locomotive engineer
- Ron Wyden, incumbent U.S. Senator

==== Declined ====
- Peter DeFazio, U.S. Representative

=== Results ===
Results by county: Wyden: 70–80%; 80–90%

Democratic primary results
Party	Candidate	Votes	%
Democratic	Ronald Wyden (Incumbent)	501,903	83.20%
Democratic	Kevin Stine	78,287	12.98%
Democratic	Paul Weaver	20,346	3.37%
	write-ins	2,740	0.45%
Total votes		603,276	100.00%

==== Results by county ====
County	Ron Wyden Democratic		Paul Weaver Democratic		Kevin Stine Democratic		Other votes		Total votes
County	%	#	%	#	%	#	%	#	Total votes
Baker	78.42%	1,205	6.04%	79	14.15%	185	1.38%	18	1,307
Benton	82.47%	15,095	2.74%	502	14.57%	2,666	0.21%	39	18,302
Clackamas	83.92%	48,355	3.27%	1,884	12.25%	7,060	0.56%	325	57,624
Clatsop	84.51%	5,173	3.84%	235	11.29%	691	0.36%	22	6,121
Columbia	80.70%	5,971	5.95%	440	12.75%	943	0.61%	45	7,399
Coos	77.80%	6,284	6.90%	557	14.60%	1,179	0.71%	57	8,077
Crook	80.97%	1,613	7.28%	145	10.79%	215	0.95%	19	1,992
Curry	80.17%	2,417	5.41%	163	13.47%	406	0.96%	29	3,015
Deschutes	85.24%	19,489	2.92%	668	11.42%	2,611	0.42%	96	22,864
Douglas	77.40%	8,159	7.48%	789	14.27%	1,504	0.85%	90	10,542
Gilliam	84.31%	188	6.73%	15	6.73%	15	2.24%	5	223
Grant	77.46%	519	6.12%	41	13.43%	90	2.99%	20	670
Harney	80.18%	542	7.25%	49	10.65%	72	1.92%	13	676
Hood River	84.57%	3,376	3.18%	127	12.05%	481	0.20%	8	3,992
Jackson	77.86%	22,152	3.34%	949	18.35%	5,221	0.46%	130	28,452
Jefferson	81.59%	1,418	6.33%	110	11.34%	197	0.75%	13	1,738
Josephine	77.92%	7,065	4.73%	429	16.37%	1,484	0.98%	89	9,067
Klamath	78.52%	4,179	5.73%	305	14.60%	777	1.15%	61	5,322
Lake	76.74%	409	7.88%	42	14.45%	77	0.94%	5	533
Lane	83.64%	58,057	3.31%	2,300	12.70%	8,819	0.35%	241	69,417
Lincoln	82.28%	7,144	4.60%	399	12.73%	1,105	0.40%	35	8,683
Linn	78.20%	9,435	6.31%	761	14.76%	1,781	0.74%	89	12,066
Malheur	75.48%	948	8.20%	103	14.81%	186	1.51%	19	1,256
Marion	81.20%	27,409	4.63%	1,562	13.54%	4,569	0.64%	215	33,755
Morrow	80.03%	541	8.28%	56	10.80%	73	0.89%	6	676
Multnomah	85.30%	148,980	2.04%	3,556	12.32%	21,510	0.35%	603	174,649
Polk	81.64%	8,130	4.88%	486	12.96%	1,291	0.52%	52	9,959
Sherman	74.41%	125	10.12%	17	11.91%	20	3.57%	6	168
Tillamook	83.24%	3,422	4.31%	177	12.16%	500	0.29%	12	4,111
Umatilla	82.40%	3,656	5.12%	227	11.97%	531	0.52%	23	4,437
Union	81.05%	1,972	5.67%	138	12.50%	304	0.78%	19	2,433
Wallowa	86.25%	734	2.12%	18	11.05%	94	0.59%	5	851
Wasco	81.63%	2,501	5.48%	168	12.40%	380	0.49%	15	3,064
Washington	84.21%	65,565	3.06%	2,385	12.43%	9,677	0.30%	232	77,859
Wheeler	76.36%	126	4.85%	8	12.73%	21	6.06%	10	165
Yamhill	82.37%	9,729	3.86%	456	13.14%	1,552	0.63%	74	11,811

== Republican Party primary ==
=== Candidates ===
==== Declared ====
- Mark Callahan, information technology consultant and perennial candidate
- Sam Carpenter, businessman and candidate for the U.S. Senate in 2014
- Dan Laschober, business consultant
- Faye Stewart, Lane County Commissioner

=== Results ===
Callahan: 30–40%; 40–50%; Carpenter: 30–40%; 40–50%; Stewart: 40–50%

Republican primary results
Party	Candidate	Votes	%
Republican	Mark Callahan	123,473	38.24%
Republican	Sam Carpenter	104,494	32.36%
Republican	Faye Stewart	57,399	17.78%
Republican	Dan Laschober	34,157	10.58%
	write-ins	3,357	1.04%
Total votes		322,880	100.00%

== Independent Party primary ==
=== Candidates ===
==== Declared ====
- Steven Reynolds, businessman, Progressive nominee for OR-01 in 2012 and Pacific Green nominee for OR-01 in 2014
- Marvin Sandnes, businessman

=== Results ===
Independent primary results
Party	Candidate	Votes	%
Independent Party	Steven Reynolds	10,497	40.80%
Independent Party	Marvin Sandnes	4,733	18.40%
	write-ins	10,496	40.80%
Total votes		25,726	100.00%

== Working Families Party ==
The Working Families Party of Oregon, which usually cross-endorses Democratic candidates, nominated their own candidate in protest of Sen. Ron Wyden's support of the Trans-Pacific Partnership.

=== Candidates ===
==== Declared ====
- Shanti Lewallen, attorney, labor union activist, and longshoreman

== Pacific Green Party and Oregon Progressive Party ==
The Pacific Green Party and the Oregon Progressive Party cross-endorsed Eric Navickas, former member of the Ashland, Oregon City Council.

=== Candidates ===
==== Declared ====
- Eric Navickas, former Ashland City Councilman

== General election ==
=== Predictions ===
Source	Ranking	As of
The Cook Political Report	Safe D	November 2, 2016
Sabato's Crystal Ball	Safe D	November 7, 2016
Rothenberg Political Report	Safe D	November 3, 2016
Daily Kos	Safe D	November 8, 2016
Real Clear Politics	Safe D	November 7, 2016

=== Polling ===
Poll source	Date(s) administered	Sample size	Margin of error	Ron Wyden (D)	Mark Callahan (R)	Other	Undecided
SurveyMonkey	November 1–7, 2016	1,595	± 4.6%	63%	32%	—	5%
SurveyMonkey	October 31–November 6, 2016	1,483	± 4.6%	64%	32%	—	4%
SurveyMonkey	October 28–November 3, 2016	1,150	± 4.6%	64%	32%	—	4%
SurveyMonkey	October 27–November 2, 2016	934	± 4.6%	64%	33%	—	3%
SurveyMonkey	October 26–November 1, 2016	809	± 4.6%	61%	34%	—	5%
SurveyMonkey	October 25–31, 2016	743	± 4.6%	62%	34%	—	4%
KATU-TV/SurveyUSA	October 10–12, 2016	654	± 3.9%	54%	32%	6%	9%
Gravis Marketing (R-Breitbart)	October 4, 2016	1,248	± 2.8%	52%	33%	—	15%

=== Results ===
United States Senate election in Oregon, 2016
Party	Candidate	Votes	%	±%
Democratic	Ronald Wyden (incumbent)	1,105,119	56.60%	−0.62%
Republican	Mark Callahan	651,106	33.35%	−5.90%
Working Families	Shanti Lewallen	61,915	3.17%	+1.86%
Independent Party	Steven Reynolds	59,516	3.05%	N/A
Pacific Green	Eric Navickas	48,823	2.50%	N/A
Libertarian	Jim Lindsay	23,941	1.23%	+0.12
n/a	Write-ins	2,058	0.10%	0.00%
Total votes		1,952,478	100.0%	N/A
Democratic hold				

==== Results by county ====
County	Ron Wyden Democratic		Mark Callahan Republican		Various candidates		Margin		Total votes cast
County	#	%	#	%	#	%	#	%	Total votes cast
Baker	3,348	38.6%	4,654	53.6%	677	7.9%	-1,306	-15.0%	8,679
Benton	29,007	60.9%	12,998	27.3%	5,592	11.7%	16,009	33.6%	47,597
Clackamas	113,152	54.1%	78,099	37.3%	17,922	8.6%	35,053	16.8%	209,173
Clatsop	11,143	57.8%	6,201	32.2%	1,929	10.0%	4,942	25.6%	19,273
Columbia	13,064	50.0%	10,123	38.8%	2,922	11.2%	2,941	11.2%	26,109
Coos	13,468	43.8%	14,086	45.8%	3,205	10.3%	-618	-2.0%	30,759
Crook	4,840	40.3%	6,254	52.1%	903	7.6%	-1,414	-11.8%	11,997
Curry	5,395	43.9%	5,633	45.8%	1,269	10.3%	-238	-1.9%	12,297
Deschutes	52,098	54.0%	36,041	37.4%	8,350	8.6%	16,057	16.6%	96,489
Douglas	19,832	37.8%	27,634	52.7%	4,938	9.4%	-7,802	-14.9%	52,404
Gilliam	507	49.8%	442	43.4%	70	8.9%	65	6.4%	1,019
Grant	1,631	38.5%	2,277	53.7%	331	7.8%	-646	-15.2%	4,239
Harney	1,540	39.3%	2,070	52.9%	304	7.8%	-530	-13.6%	3,914
Hood River	6,967	64.9%	2,646	24.7%	1,116	10.3%	4,321	40.2%	10,729
Jackson	53,474	50.2%	42,336	39.8%	10,658	10.0%	11,138	10.4%	106,468
Jefferson	4,517	48.5%	3,967	42.6%	835	9.0%	550	5.9%	9,319
Josephine	18,463	42.4%	20,767	47.7%	4,280	9.9%	-2,304	-5.3%	43,510
Klamath	12,342	41.1%	14,808	49.4%	2,849	9.8%	-2,466	-8.3%	29,999
Lake	1,363	35.2%	2,227	57.6%	278	7.2%	-864	-22.4%	3,868
Lane	110,836	59.2%	56,716	30.3%	19,744	10.6%	54,120	28.9%	187,296
Lincoln	14,512	58.2%	7,725	31.0%	2,688	10.8%	6,787	27.2%	24,925
Linn	23,908	41.8%	26,991	47.2%	6,247	11.0%	-3,083	-5.4%	57,146
Malheur	3,082	30.3%	6,045	59.3%	1,061	10.4%	-2,963	-29.0%	10,188
Marion	66,269	49.5%	55,351	41.4%	12,207	9.1%	10,918	8.1%	133,827
Morrow	1,719	41.7%	1,978	47.9%	430	10.5%	-259	-6.2%	4,127
Multnomah	285,058	73.7%	56,395	14.6%	45,231	11.8%	228,663	59.1%	386,684
Polk	19,250	48.7%	16,693	42.2%	3,622	9.2%	2,557	6.5%	39,565
Sherman	440	44.0%	498	49.8%	61	6.1%	-58	-5.8%	999
Tillamook	7,187	53.0%	5,100	37.6%	1,276	9.4%	2,087	15.4%	13,563
Umatilla	11,279	41.9%	12,899	47.9%	2,727	10.1%	-1,620	-6.0%	26,905
Union	5,302	41.7%	6,372	50.1%	1,047	8.3%	-1,070	-8.4%	12,721
Wallowa	1,767	41.0%	2,238	51.9%	303	7.0%	-471	-10.9%	4,308
Wasco	6,512	55.5%	4,124	35.1%	1,104	8.5%	2,388	20.4%	11,740
Washington	158,685	60.5%	78,184	29.8%	25,374	9.6%	80,501	30.7%	262,243
Wheeler	355	44.2%	384	47.8%	64	8.0%	-29	-3.6%	803
Yamhill	22,807	47.9%	20,150	42.3%	4,639	9.8%	2,657	5.6%	47,596
Totals	1,105,119	56.6%	651,106	33.3%	196,253	10.1%	454,013	23.3%	1,952,478

Counties that flipped from Democratic to Republican

- Coos (largest city: Coos Bay)

Counties that flipped from Republican to Democratic

- Deschutes (largest city: Bend)
- Jefferson (largest city: Madras)

==== By congressional district ====
Wyden won all five congressional districts, including one that elected a Republican.

District	Wyden	Callahan	Representative
1st	60%	31%	Suzanne Bonamici
2nd	48%	43%	Greg Walden
3rd	70%	19%	Earl Blumenauer
4th	52%	37%	Peter DeFazio
5th	53%	38%	Kurt Schrader
