= James Manning Jr. =

American politician

James Manning
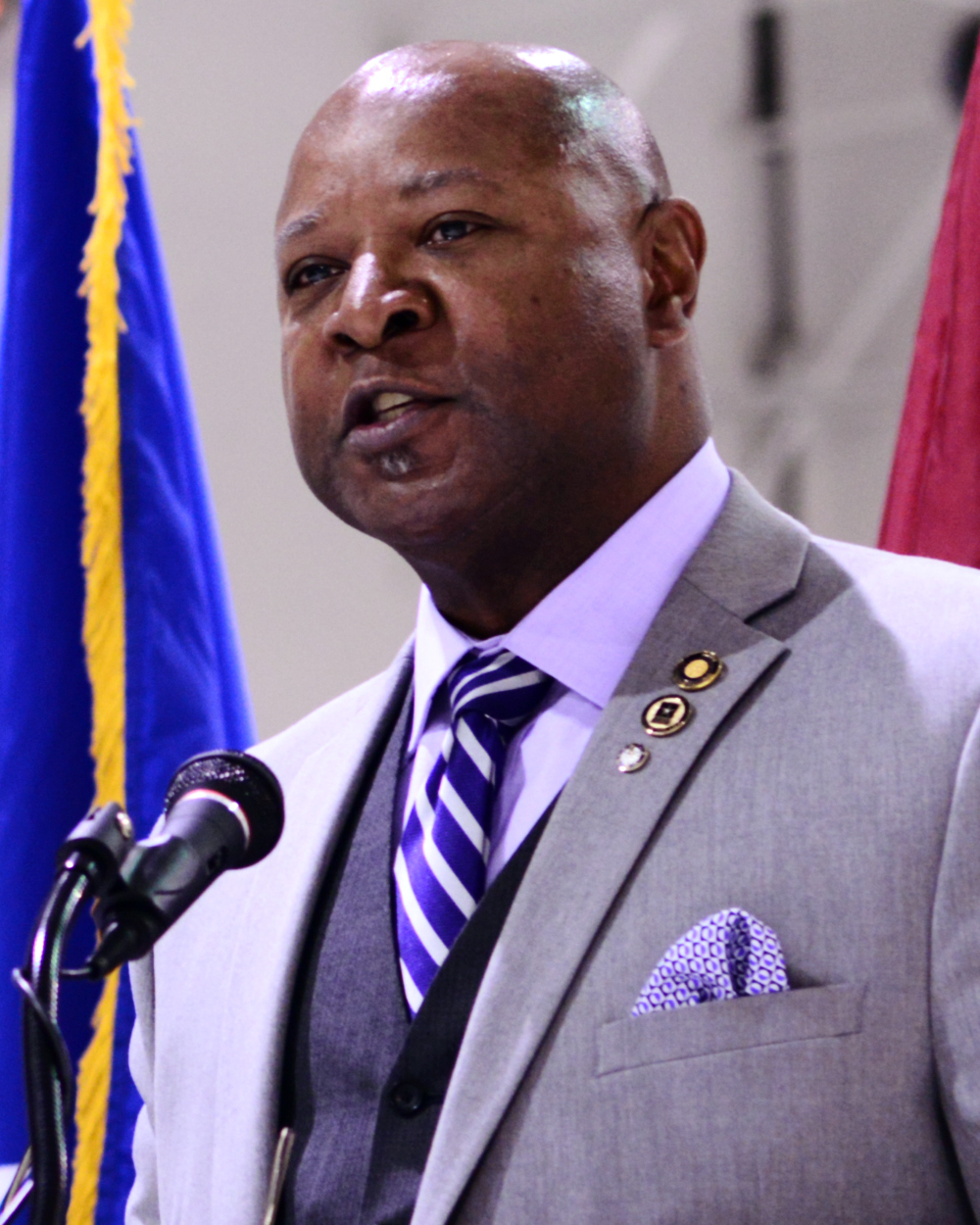
- Manning in 2018

President pro tempore of the Oregon State Senate
- Incumbent
- Assumed office January 11, 2021
- Preceded by: Laurie Monnes Anderson

Member of the Oregon State Senate from the 7th district
- Incumbent
- Assumed office December 15, 2016
- Preceded by: Chris Edwards

Personal details
- Born: James Ivory Manning Jr.
- Party: Democratic
- Education: Lincoln University (attended); Columbia College (BA); Chapman University (MS); Grand Canyon University (EdD)

Military service
- Allegiance: United States
- Branch/service: United States Army

James Ivory Manning Jr. is an American politician and veteran. A member of the Democratic Party, he has served in the Oregon State Senate since 2016. He represents the 7th district, which covers parts of Lane County, including parts of Eugene and the cities of Elmira and Veneta. Manning unsuccessfully ran for Secretary of State in the 2024 election.

== Military service and early career ==
Manning worked as a state correctional officer and police officer prior to enlisting in the U.S. Army in 1983. Manning spent 24 years on active duty in the Army, and retired in 2007.

== Political career ==
After retiring from the military, Manning moved to Eugene, Oregon, and became part of the Oregon Commission on Black Affairs. In 2012, he was elected to serve on the Eugene Water and Electric Board.

=== Oregon State Senate ===
Manning unsuccessfully ran for a seat in the Oregon House of Representatives in 2016, losing to Julie Fahey in the 14th district Democratic primary. He was appointed to the Senate in December 2016 in order to fill the seat vacated by Chris Edwards, who resigned from office. Manning was elected to a full term in 2018 unopposed. He was elected once again in the 2022 election.

As a legislator, Manning supported efforts to expand automatic voter registration and to authorize prepaid envelopes for Oregon's mail-in voting system.

Manning serves as chair of the Senate Committee on Veterans Emergency Management, Federal and World Affairs.

He was a co-chief sponsor of House Bill 2015 (2019), which allowed Oregon residents to obtain standard driver's licenses and identification cards without providing legal presence in the United States.

In 2023, Manning was a chief sponsor of Senate Bill 1089, which established the Universal Health Plan Governance Board, tasked with developing a plan to finance and administer a universal health plan for Oregon.

=== 2024 Oregon Secretary of State campaign ===
In September 2023, Manning announced his candidacy for Oregon Secretary of State in the 2024 election, facing State Treasurer Tobias Read in the Democratic primary. Both candidates said their main goal was to restore trust in the office, which had been vacated by the resignation of Shemia Fagan in 2023.

Manning highlighted his army service and, in a profile for the Capital Chronicle, said it qualified him to oversee elections and audits. Read won the primary with 69.8% of the vote to Manning's 22.4%

== Electoral history ==
2018 Oregon State Senator, 7th district
Party	Candidate	Votes	%
Democratic	James I Manning Jr	38,262	94.7
Write-in		2,146	5.3
Total votes		40,408	100%

2022 Oregon State Senator, 7th district
Party	Candidate	Votes	%
Democratic	James I Manning Jr	42,101	64.4
Republican	Raquel M Ivie	23,077	35.3
Write-in		247	0.4
Total votes		65,425	100%

Oregon Senate
Preceded by Laurie Monnes Anderson	President pro tempore of the Oregon Senate; 2021–present	Incumbent
