= Chris Edwards (Oregon politician) =

American politician

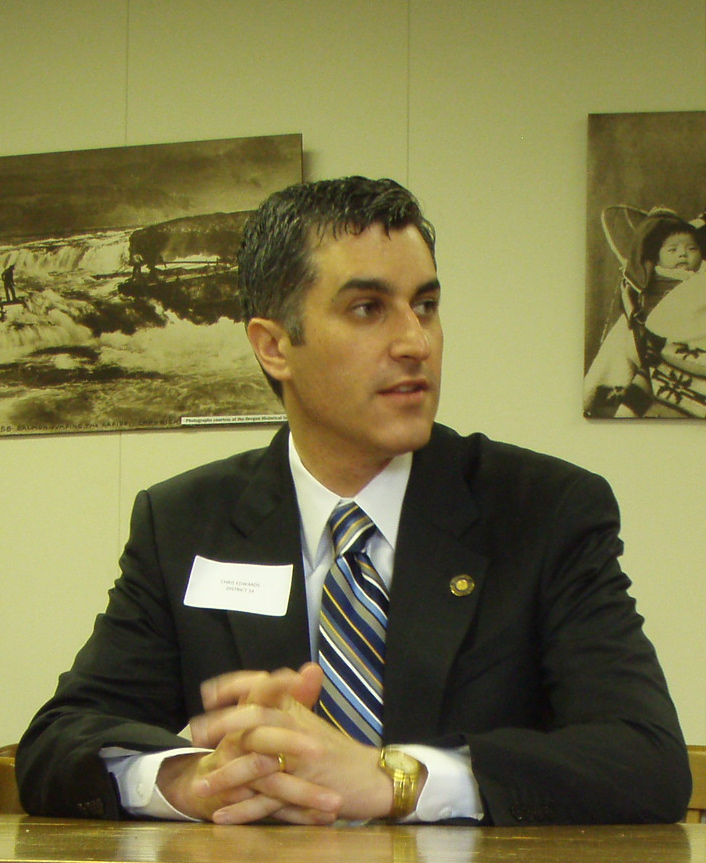
- Edwards in 2009

Member of the Oregon State Senate from the 7th district
- In office 2009–2016
- Preceded by: Vicki Walker
- Succeeded by: James Manning Jr.

Member of the Oregon House of Representatives from the 14th district
- In office 2006–2009
- Succeeded by: Val Hoyle

Personal details
- Born: 1973 (age 52–53) Roseburg, Oregon
- Party: Democratic
- Spouse(s): Ali, divorced 2012
- Children: Simon and Anna
- Education: Oregon State University
- Occupation: Family business

Chris Edwards (born 1973) is an American politician and university administrator from Oregon; he is a member of the Democratic party.

Edwards currently works in an administrative role at the University of Oregon overseeing the creation of the new Phil and Penny Knight Campus for Accelerating Scientific Impact, he came to this job having served in the Oregon State Senate, representing District 7, for six years. Previously, Edwards served in the Oregon House of Representatives, representing District 14 from 2006 until his appointment to the Senate.

== Electoral history ==
2006 Oregon State Representative, 14th district
| Party | Candidate | Votes | % |
|---|---|---|---|
| Democratic | Chris Edwards | 12,320 | 52.1 |
| Republican | Debi Farr | 11,257 | 47.6 |
| Write-in | | 56 | 0.2 |
| Total votes | | 23,633 | 100% |

2008 Oregon State Representative, 14th district
| Party | Candidate | Votes | % |
|---|---|---|---|
| Democratic | Chris Edwards | 20,552 | 97.0 |
| Write-in | | 630 | 3.0 |
| Total votes | | 21,182 | 100% |

2010 Oregon State Senator, 7th district
| Party | Candidate | Votes | % |
|---|---|---|---|
| Democratic | Chris Edwards | 29,308 | 62.3 |
| Republican | Karen Bodner | 17,511 | 37.2 |
| Write-in | | 210 | 0.4 |
| Total votes | | 47,029 | 100% |

2014 Oregon State Senator, 7th district
| Party | Candidate | Votes | % |
|---|---|---|---|
| Democratic | Chris Edwards | 30,550 | 95.0 |
| Write-in | | 1,607 | 5.0 |
| Total votes | | 32,157 | 100% |
