= List of mayors of Eugene, Oregon =

This is a list of mayors of the city of Eugene, Oregon. The years following each name denote each mayor's term in office.

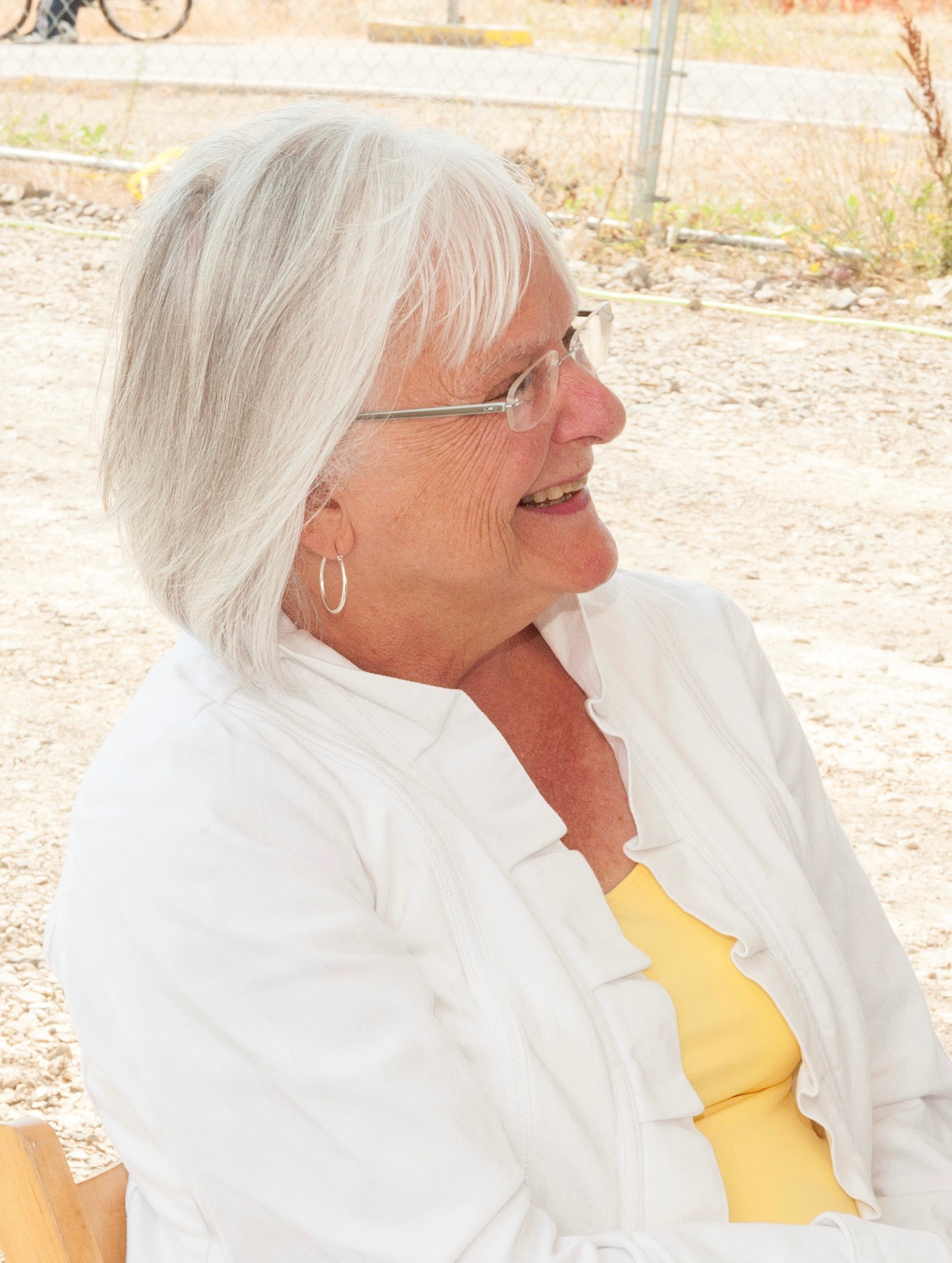
Kitty Piercy, mayor from 2005–2017.

- J. B. Underwood (1864–1869) (official office name at the time: President of the Board of Trustees)
- A. S. Patterson (1869–1873)
- Joel Ware (1873–1875)
- Benjamin Franklin Dorris (1875–1877)
- George B. Dorris (1877–1879)
- Benjamin Franklin Dorris (1879–1881)
- Thomas Grundy Hendricks (1881–1883)
- G. B. Dunn (1883–1885)
- Francis Berrian Dunn (1885–1889)
- Albert Gallitin Hovey (1889–1891)
- John Henry McClung (1891–1893)
- Sam H. Friendly (1893–1895)
- Joseph DeWitt Matlock (1895–1897)
- William F. Kuykendall (1897–1899)
- Tom W. Harris (1899–1901)
- Gabriel Russell Chrisman (1901–1905)
- Francis Marion Wilkins (1905–1907)
- Joseph DeWitt Matlock (1907–1910)
- Frank J. Berger (1910–1913)
- Darwin E. Yoran (1913–1915)
- W. A. Bell (1915–1917)
- Charles O. Peterson (1917–1923)
- Edwin B. Parks (1923–1925)
- Ernest U. Lee (1925–1927)
- Alex L. Williamson (1927–1929)
- Howard E. Wilder (1929–1932)
- Elisha Large (1932–1945)
- Earl L. McNutt (1945–1949)
- Victor Edwin Johnson (1949–1956)
- John Joseph McGinty (1957–1958)
- Edwin Earl Cone (1958–1968)
- Les Anderson (1969–1977)
- Gus Keller (1977–1984)
- Brian Obie (1985–1988)
- Jeffrey Miller (1989–1992)
- Ruth Bascom (1993–1996)
- Jim Torrey (1997–2004)
- Kitty Piercy (2005–2017)
- Lucy Vinis (2017–2025)
- Kaarin Knudson (2025–present)

== See also ==
- List of mayors of places in Oregon
- Lists of Oregon-related topics
