= Jim Torrey =

American politician (born 1940)

Member of the Eugene School Board
- In office 2007–2019

Mayor of Eugene
- In office 1997–2004
- Preceded by: Ruth Bascom
- Succeeded by: Kitty Piercy

Member of the Eugene City Council
- In office 1995–1997

Member of the Waldport, Oregon City Council
- In office 1961–1964

Personal details
- Born: 1940 (age 85–86)
- Party: Republican (1961–2007); Independent Party of Oregon

Jim Torrey (born 1940) is an American politician who served as mayor of Eugene from 1997 to 2004. Torrey was nominated in 2006 for an Oregon State Senate seat, but was defeated by incumbent Vicki Walker. He then served was elected to the Eugene School Board as Representative 5 in 2007, but was defeated by Shabram Martina in 2019. Torrey was first elected to public office at the age of 21, when he won a seat on the Waldport, Oregon, city council.

Torrey was a member of the Oregon Republican Party from age 21 until age 67; in 2007, he switched his registration to the newly formed Independent Party of Oregon.

== Early life and career ==
Jim Torrey was born in 1940 and grew up in Waldport, Oregon. After graduating from Waldport High School in 1958, he spent a year at the University of Oregon majoring in business but did not graduate. He then worked in advertising and workers' compensation.

== Mayoral tenure ==
Torrey's mayoral tenure was marked by allegations of police brutality against Eugene citizens.

Shortly after his election in 1997, Torrey's Eugene police sprayed pepper spray at environmentalist peaceful protestors during a confrontation at a downtown parking garage, after which the city had to settle payments with those who they injured. On August 6, 1997, a protestor vomited on Torrey at a Eugene City Council meeting.

On June 18, 1999, Eugene police used tear gas on an anti-capitalist protest, which affected over 200 people and arrested 20 demonstrators. Citizens claimed that the mayor had directed police to needlessly harass individuals in black clothing.

== 2008 mayoral candidacy ==
Torrey ran again for mayor of Eugene in 2008. He qualified for a runoff election in November of that year, but lost to incumbent Kitty Piercy. Torrey's decision as a former two-term mayor to challenge a first term was described as an "unprecedented contest" in Eugene politics.

== Post-mayoral career ==
After his time as mayor, Torrey unsuccessfully ran for the Oregon State Senate in 2006 as the Republican nominee. He was then elected to the non-partisan Board of Directors of the Eugene School District in 2007. He served three terms before being defeated in 2019 by Martina Shabram, an educator and political newcomer. A majority of the Directors then appointed him to a newly vacated seat, in the face of opposition from the teachers' union and local community groups.

== Electoral history ==
2006 Oregon State Senator, 7th district
| Party | Candidate | Votes | % |
|---|---|---|---|
| Democratic | Vicki Walker | 25,667 | 51.6 |
| Republican | Jim Torrey | 23,962 | 48.2 |
| Write-in | | 134 | 0.3 |
| Total votes | | 49,763 | 100% |
