= John U. Bascom =

American surgeon and researcher

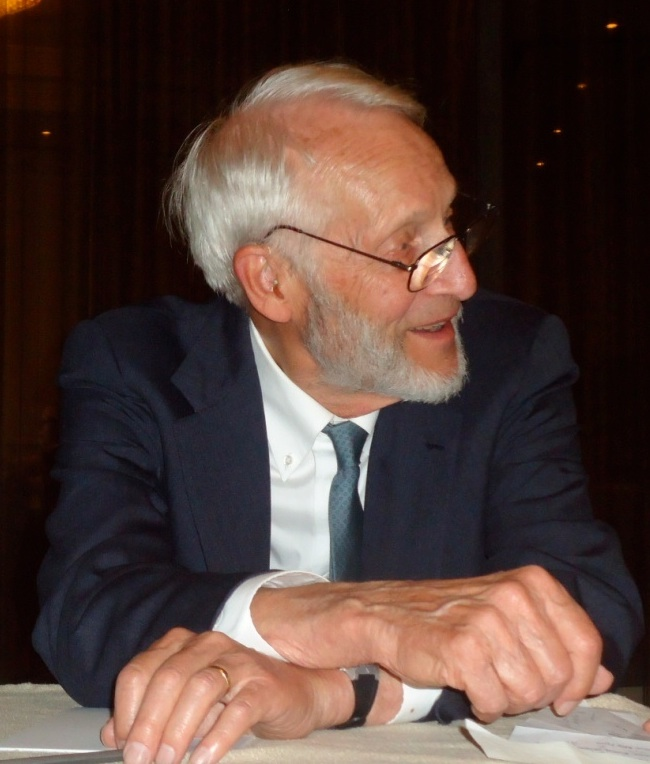
- Born: June 6, 1925; Richmond, Virginia, U.S.
- Died: March 22, 2013 (aged 87); Eugene, Oregon, U.S.
- Education: United States Merchant Marine Academy; Kansas State University (B.S., M.S.); Northwestern University School of Medicine (MD); University of Minnesota (Ph.D)
- Known for: Research in pilonidal disease
- Spouse: Ruth Bascom
- Scientific career
- Fields: Neurosurgery
- Workplaces: American College of Surgeons

John U. Bascom M.D. (June 6, 1925 – March 22, 2013), FACS, was an American surgeon and researcher who pioneered new understanding and treatment of pilonidal disease.

== Early life ==
He was born June 6, 1925, in Richmond, Virginia, to Lillian and Dr. K.F. Bascom. His father was an anatomist and teacher at the Medical College of Virginia. Bascom graduated from the United States Merchant Marine Academy in Kings Point, New York, and served in the Pacific from 1943 until the masters, mates and pilots strike of October 1, 1946.

== Education ==
He earned a bachelor's in physics and master's degree in biological science from Kansas State University, graduated from Northwestern University School of Medicine on June 15, 1953, and interned at Cook County Hospital in Chicago, before starting a surgical fellowship at Minneapolis General Hospital. He earned a PhD in surgery from the University of Minnesota in 1960, where he researched topics in vascular surgery, including vascular graft materials, with Dr. C.R. Hitchcock.

== Career ==
He moved to Oregon in 1960 and worked in Eugene, where he did much of his important research into pilonidal disease, a condition more popularly known as "Jeep seat." The condition had long been attributed to congenital pits in the skin, ingrown hairs or trauma from repeated pressure over the tailbone (such as riding long periods on bumpy terrain in a Jeep). Bascom researched and proposed an alternate theory that normal hair follicles grew infected and swelled shut, with the infection then tracking down into soft fat below the skin and creating abscesses. He also helped adapt and refine less-invasive surgeries for treating persistent pilonidal disease. The successful surgical procedure he developed is known as the "Bascom cleft lift procedure." This work was praised as "lucid" and a "paradigm shift" by some fellow surgeons. He also published articles on topics including hernias and saline overload, and belonged to professional groups including the Oregon Board of Medical Examiners, which he chaired.

== Personal life ==
Bascom met his wife, Ruth Bascom (who became the first female mayor of Eugene, Oregon) in sixth grade in Manhattan, Kansas. The two married 13 years later and had four daughters and two sons, all of whom went into medicine (four became doctors, one a nurse and one a pharmacist). He was an avid cyclist, often biking to work, and broke his hip in a bicycle accident at age 87. Bascom died in Eugene, Oregon, from complications on March 22, 2013.
