= Lucy Vinis =

American politician

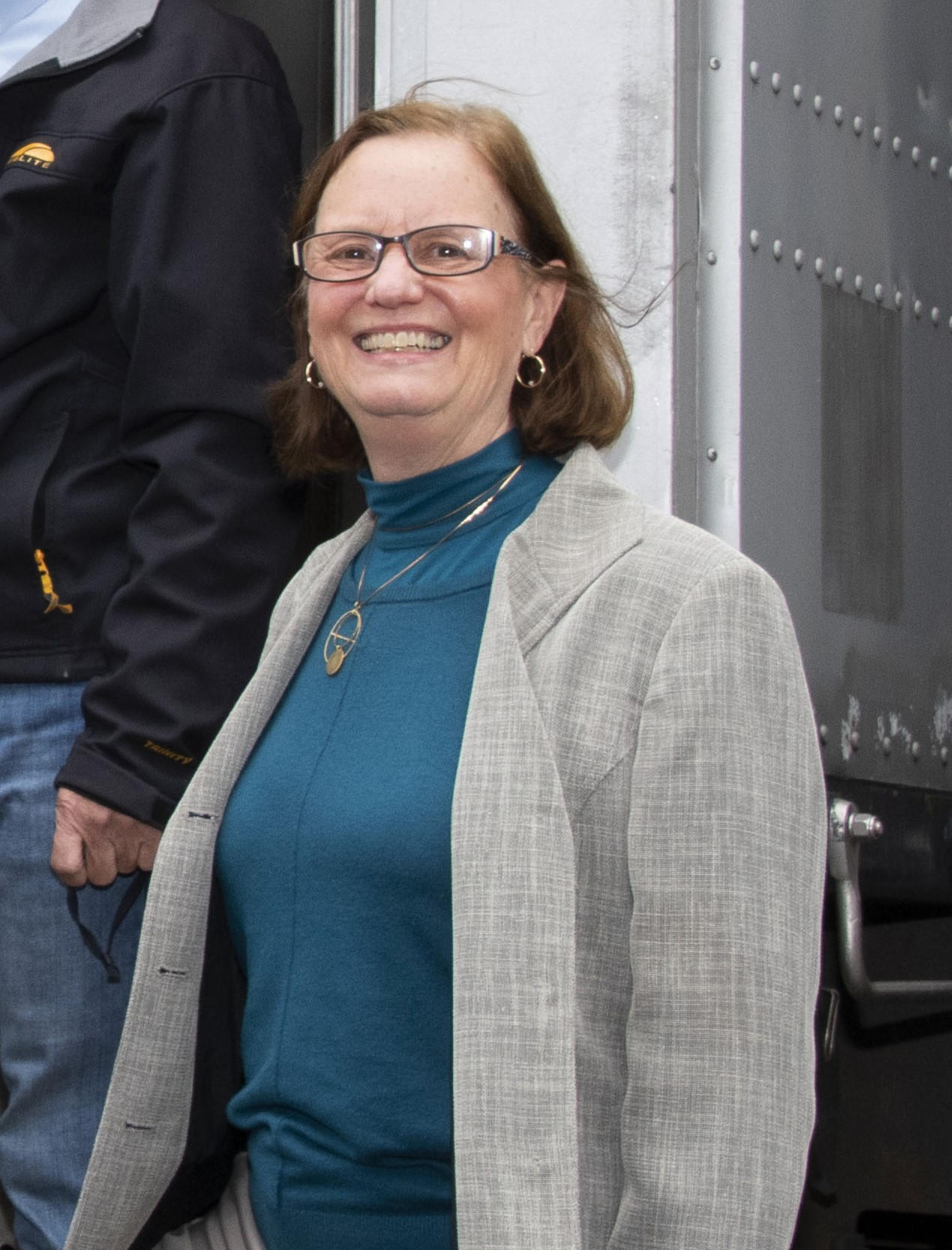
- Vinis in 2021

Mayor of Eugene
- In office January 9, 2017 – January 1, 2025
- Preceded by: Kitty Piercy
- Succeeded by: Kaarin Knudson

Personal details
- Born: 1952 or 1953 (age 72–73)
- Party: Democratic
- Spouse: Lawrence Vinis (died 2008)
- Children: 2
- Profession: Politician
- Website: http://www.lucyvinis.com

Lucy Vinis (born 1952/53) is an American politician. She was elected mayor of Eugene, Oregon, in 2016, and started her term in January 2017.

== Education ==
Vinis is a graduate of Kenyon College in Ohio and earned master's degrees from the University of Maryland and the University of Michigan.

== Career ==
Her position as mayor of Eugene is her first time in public office. She is a member of the Democratic Party.

During her two terms as mayor she has been an advocate for the environment and addressing climate change and has helped to navigate Eugene's housing and homelessness crisis. Vinis was appointed to the U.S. Environmental Protection Agency's Local Government Advisory Committee in 2021 and serves as Vice Chair.

In 2020, Vinis created the Youth Advisory Council to create an opportunity for youth to influence policy at the local government level.

In 2023, Vinis convened a Blue Ribbon Panel on Economic Development, which resulted in 12 recommendations to promote a healthy local economy including workforce development, development of all housing types, and understanding the needs of BIPOC businesses.

On July 27, 2020, after the Eugene City Council deadlocked at 4–4 on a vote to refer a measure allowing STAR voting to be used in city elections to the November 2020 ballot, Vinis cast the deciding vote against the referral.

In September 2023, Vinis announced that she would not seek a third term as mayor, instead endorsing architect Kaarin Knudson. Knudson went on to win the mayoral election with 74.1% of the vote.

== Personal life ==
Vinis has lived in Eugene since 1991. She has worked for non-profit organizations in Eugene, including EarthShare of Oregon, Northwest Coalition for Alternatives to Pesticides, and ShelterCare.

== Electoral history ==
Eugene, Oregon Mayor Primary Election, May 17, 2016
Party	Candidate	Votes	%
Non-Partisan	Lucy Vinis	28,010	52.51
Non-Partisan	Mike Clark	19,976	37.45
Non-Partisan	Bob Cassidy	2,283	4.28
Non-Partisan	Scott Landfield	1,762	3.30
Non-Partisan	Stefan G. Strek	1,003	1.88
Non-Partisan	Write-ins	306	0.57

Eugene, Oregon Mayor Primary Election, May 19, 2020
Party	Candidate	Votes	%
Non-Partisan	Lucy Vinis	32,193	66.98
Non-Partisan	Thomas Hiura	4,952	10.30
Non-Partisan	Stacy Westover	2,936	6.11
Non-Partisan	Zondie Zinke	2,456	5.11
Non-Partisan	Robert Patterson	1,552	3.23
Non-Partisan	Matthew Yook	1,490	3.10
Non-Partisan	Ben Ricker	1,224	2.55
Non-Partisan	Write-ins	1,258	2.62
