= William Kuykendall =

American politician and physician (1855–1934)

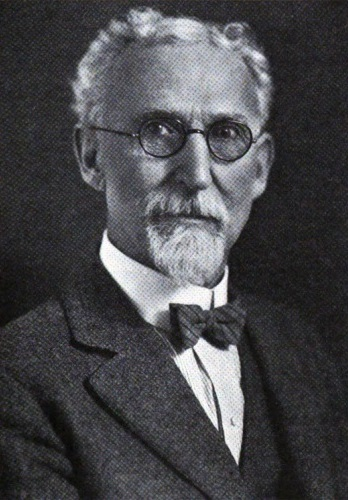

17th President of the Oregon State Senate
- In office 1905–1906
- Preceded by: George C. Brownell
- Succeeded by: Edward W. Haines

Member of the Oregon Senate from the 4th district
- In office 1898–1906
- Preceded by: John H. McClung
- Succeeded by: Isaac H. Bingham
- Constituency: Lane County

Personal details
- Born: March 1, 1855 Wilbur, Oregon Territory, U.S.
- Died: December 7, 1934 (aged 79) Eugene, Oregon, U.S.
- Party: Republican
- Spouse(s): Mary Ada Alyson (1876–1898); Anna May Rowland (1922–1934)
- Profession: Physician

William Kuykendall (March 1, 1855 – December 7, 1934) was an American politician and physician from Eugene, Oregon. He was a conservative Republican who represented Lane County in the Oregon State Senate. He served two four-year terms in the senate plus an extra year and was senate president from 1905 through 1906. Prior to being elected to the state senate, Kuykendall served as mayor of Eugene. He practiced medicine in Oregon for 56 years and was the founder of Eugene's first hospital. He also taught medicine at Willamette Medical College for several years.

== Early life ==
Kuykendall was born on March 1, 1855, in Wilbur, Oregon. He was the son of John Kuykendall and Malinda (Stark) Kuykendall. His father was born in Indiana, but moved to Oregon with his wife in 1852, traveling along the Oregon Trail in a covered wagon. Kuykendall's parents settled in Douglas County, where his father started a sawmill business. In 1874, his father took a government job at the Klamath Indian reservation. In 1876, the family relocated briefly to Santa Rosa, California before returning to Oregon. Back in Oregon, his father opened a drug store in Drain.

Kuykendall was educated at the Umpqua Academy in Wilbur, a school his father helped establish. He married Mary Ada Alyson in Wilbur on May 18, 1876. Together they had eight children. He studied medicine under his older brother Doctor George B. Kuykendall before attending Cooper Medical College in San Francisco (which later became Stanford University School of Medicine), where he graduated in 1878. After graduating, he opened a medical office in Drain, where he practiced for the next ten years.

== Eugene physician ==
Kuykendall moved his practice to Eugene in 1889. Over the next 46 years, he became one of the state's most respected physicians. In his private practice, he made house calls by horse, buggy, bicycle, and eventually by automobile. Throughout his career, he was known for his proactive interest in modern medical practices, techniques, and procedures. In 1897, he founded the Eugene Hospital, the community's first hospital. Over the years, he was repeatedly elected president of the Lane County Medical Society. He was also a member of the Oregon State Medical Society, the American Medical Association, and the American College of Surgeons. In addition, he taught gynecology at Willamette University's medical college from 1897 to 1901. Kuykendall made weekly trips from Eugene to Salem to deliver his medical lectures at Willamette.

In Eugene, Kuykendall became active in a number of community organizations. He was a member of the local Free Mason chapter, a member of the Royal Arch Masonry order, and the Knights Templar. He was also a member of the Knights of Pythias, Woodsmen of the World, Ancient Order of United Workmen, and the local Rotary Club.

Kuykendall was a dedicated Republican and was active in Eugene's civic affairs. He ran for mayor of Eugene in 1897, defeating the incumbent mayor, J. D. Matlock, by 109 votes. In the election, Kuykendall received 393 votes while Matlock got 284. As mayor, he was known for his progressive business-like leadership.

== State senator ==
While he was still mayor of Eugene, Kuykendall decided to run for the Oregon State Senate. In 1898, the Lane County Republican convention nominated him for state senate. At the convention, Kuykendall won the Republican nomination on the first ballot, receiving 121 votes from convention delegates with his only opposition, John H. McClung of Eugene, receiving just 24 votes. McClung then asked the convention to make the vote for Kuykendall unanimous. As a result, he was nominated unanimous on the second ballot.

Kuykendall won Lane County's state senate seat in the general election with 1,899 votes. The Union Party candidate, H. C. Huston, was just 19 votes behind with 1,880 (the Union Party was a short-lived coalition of populists, Democrats, and Silver Republicans) followed by Calvin Hanna, the Prohibition Party candidate, with 106 votes.

After his election, Kuykendall took his seat in the Oregon State Senate during a special session that began on September 16, 1898. Kuykendall was appointed chairman of the education committee. He also served on the ways and means committee and the medicine, pharmacy, and dentistry committee. During the session, Joseph Simon was chosen to fill Oregon's vacant United States senate seat, a seat that had been vacant for nearly two years. The special session adjourning on October 15.

Kuykendall's first regular legislative session began on January 9, 1899. During the session he was again appointed chairman of the education committee and given a seat on the powerful ways and means committee and the medicine, pharmacy, and dentistry committee. The session lasted just under six weeks, adjourning on February 18.

Since Oregon state senate terms are for four years, Kuykendall did not have to run for re-election prior to the 1901 session. However, due to redistricting he was representing senate District 4 instead of District 14. While the district number changed, his Lane County constituency remained the same. The 1901 session opened on January 14. During the session, Kuykendall was once again appointed chairman of the education committee and served on the ways and means committee and the medicine, pharmacy, and dentistry committee. When the legislature began to consider the various candidates for Oregon's open United States senate seat, Kuykendall initially supported Binger Hermann. However, he eventually switched to support John H. Mitchell, who was ultimately elected to the United States senate. After the legislature elected Mitchell to the senate, the session was adjourned on March 4.

At the Lane County Republican convention in 1902, Kuykendall was nominated for re-election to the District 4 state senate seat. He was also selected to attend the Oregon state Republican convention as a Lane County delegate.

In the general election, Democrat Lee M. Travis campaigned hard against Kuykendall. However, Kuykendall won re-election with 2,408 votes followed by Travis with 2,123 and socialist V. B. Mathews with 195.

The 1903 legislative session began on January 12 with Kuykendall representing District 4 in the state senate. At the beginning of the session, he was offered the chairmanship of the ways and means committee; however, he opted to chair the counties committee instead. The session lasted just under six weeks, adjourning on February 20. Kuykendall returned to the capitol on December 21 of that year for a short special session that ended on December 23.

=== Senate president ===
Because he was midway through his four-year term, Kuykendall did not have to run for re-election prior to the 1905 legislative session. He used his pre-legislative time to run for senate president. On the eve of the legislative session, Kuykendall had 15 of 30 senators pledged to support him for senate president. He needed only 16 votes, so it appeared he would be elected with the help of one more senator.

Oregon's 1905 legislative session opened on January 9. When the senate began to organize, Kuykendall got 15 votes for senate president (14 Republicans and 1 Democrat), 1 vote short of a majority. His main opponent was Ashland Republican Ernest V. Carter, who received 10 Republican votes, with five Democrats voting for a variety of senators, steering their votes away from Kuykendall and Carter. This impasse lasted for 65 ballots, until one of Carter's supporters broke the deadlock by switching his vote to Kuykendall.

On January 13, Kuykendall presided over a joint session of the legislature, assembled to hear Governor George E. Chamberlain's biennial message to the legislature. As Kuykendall considered committee appointments, there was a great deal of backroom maneuvering to secure powerful and preferred committee assignments. He announced senate committee assignments on January 15. There were some controversial proceedings during the session. Near the end, Kuykendall and his legislative allies arranged a joint session of the legislature to approve several contentious appointments to state commissions. While some members of the legislature objected to the decisions made in the joint session without committee recommendations, the governor agreed the appointments were valid. The senate was adjourned on February 17. In mid-1906, Kuykendall announced he was retiring from politics. However, he remained senate president until his four-year term expired at the end of 1906.

== Later life ==
After leaving the state senate, Kuykendall remained active in state and local politics. He attended Lane County's 1908 Republican convention, serving as chairman of the resolutions committee, which laid out the party's platform. He was also selected as a delegate to the state convention in Portland, representing Lane County. Kuykendall also advocated for specific issues. For example, he actively supported direct election of United States senators by individual voters.

In his professional life, Kuykendall returned to his medical practice in Eugene. His hospital was operated as a private clinic until 1922, when it was incorporated by Kuykendall and a group of Eugene doctors. Eventually, the hospital grew into a major medical facility with twelve physicians practicing at the institution. Kuykendall remained president of the hospital until 1927.

After Kuykendall's son John graduated from medical school in 1911, he joined his father's practice in Eugene. During World War I, the younger Kuykendall organized a volunteer hospital unit made up of 125 men from the University of Oregon. After training at Camp Lewis (now Fort Lewis) in Washington state, the unit deployed to France in 1918 under young Captain (Doctor) Kuykendall's command. The unit was attached to the 91st Division, providing frontline medical care to American servicemen. Doctor John Eberale Kuykendall died in Le Mans, France, of spinal meningitis on February 23, 1919. John Kuykendall was promoted to Major a few days before his death, but he was unaware of his promotion due to the seriousness of his condition at the time. He was the only member of his unit who did not return home safely from the war.

After his first wife died in May 1921, Kuykendall married Anna May Rowland of Eugene on July 19, 1922. Kuykendall remained active in his fraternal lodges throughout his life including the local Masons chapter, Knights of Pythias, Woodmen of the World, and United Workmen. He was also president of Eugene Rotary Club and the local Young Men's Christian Association.

Kuykendall died on December 7, 1934, at age 79, at his home in Eugene, Oregon. He had been ill for several months prior to his death. His funeral service was held at Eugene's First Methodist Episcopal church on December 10. He was interred at the Independent Order of Odd Fellows cemetery in Eugene.

Today, Kuykendall's papers are in the University of Oregon library's special archive collection. His archive files include personal and professional correspondence, an autobiography manuscript plus other manuscripts, speech notes, and miscellaneous papers dating from 1902 to 1933. The Oregon Historical Society research library maintains a Kuykendall family archive that includes additional William Kuykendall correspondence along with photographs, clippings, and general ephemera related to his life and career.
