= Vicki Walker =

American politician

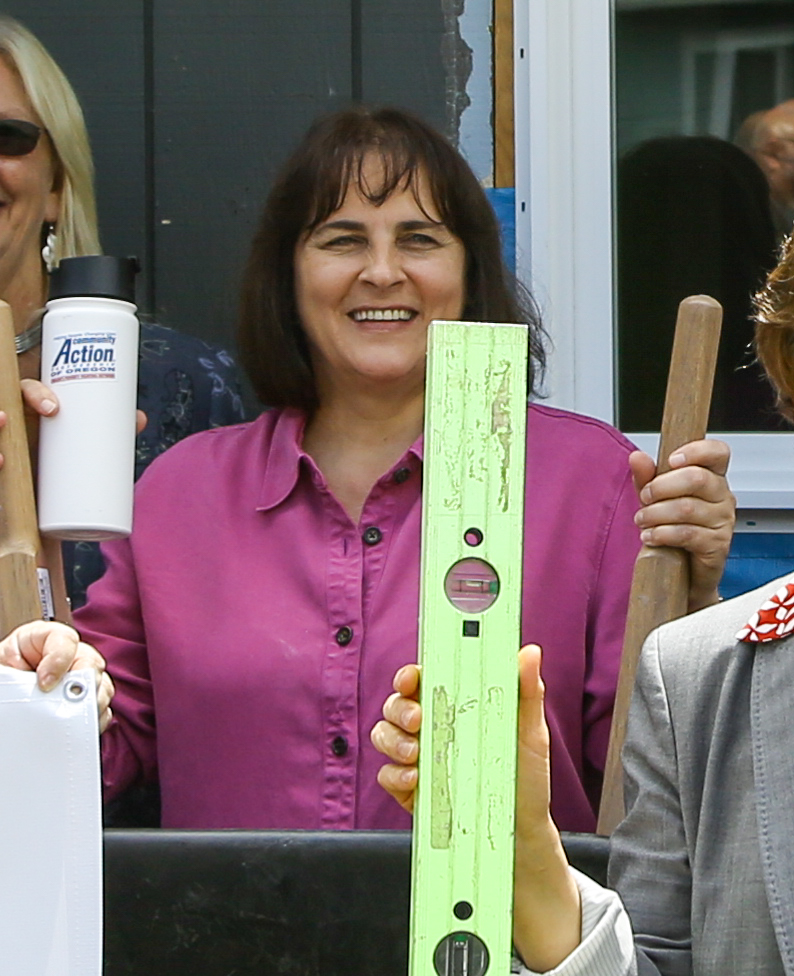
- Walker in 2009

Member of the Oregon State Senate from the 7th district
- In office 2003–2009
- Succeeded by: Chris Edwards

Member of the Oregon House of Representatives from the 41st district
- In office 1998–2002

Personal details
- Born: May 29, 1956 (age 70) Monroe, Washington, U.S.
- Party: Democratic
- Spouse: Steven Walker
- Children: 2
- Education: University of Oregon (BA)
- Website: vickiwalker.com

Vicki Lynn Walker (born May 29, 1956) is an American politician. She served as the Oregon State Director for Rural Development with the U.S. Department of Agriculture. A member of the Democratic Party, Walker previously served in both houses of the Oregon Legislature and briefly served as chair of the state's parole board. Walker is known as an advocate for utility customers and as an outspoken critic of influential former Governor Neil Goldschmidt.

== Early life ==
Walker was born in Monroe, Washington, and graduated from Reedsport High School in Reedsport, Oregon, in 1974. She attended the University of Oregon and graduated in 1978 with a bachelor's degree in political science.

== Career ==
After college, Walker was a self-employed court reporter from 1983, and a certified shorthand reporter.

From 1992 to 1994, Walker served as the chair of the Lane County Democratic Central Committee. In addition, she served as secretary-treasurer and area representative for the Cal Young Neighborhood Association in Eugene. Walker has also volunteered on campaigns and has helped to fundraise for non-profit organizations.

=== Oregon Legislature ===
In November 1998, Walker was elected to the Oregon House of Representatives. She proposed legislation making the prevention of youth suicide a state priority as well as a bill that provides consumers protection from predatory lending practices. Walker was re-elected in 2000. She served on the Oregon House Judiciary, Criminal Law Subcommittee, Labor and Consumer Affairs, and Smart Growth & Commerce Committees.

Walker was elected to the Oregon State Senate in November 2002 for the 7th District, covering Eugene, Junction City, and Harrisburg. She served as vice-chair of the Business and Labor Committee as well as a member of the Judiciary, Health Policy and General Government Committees. Legislation she sponsored included strengthening workers compensation and establishing civil penalties for e-mail spam. In 2005, she served as the chair of the Education and Workforce Committee and vice chair of the Energy and Public Lands Committee.

Walker was elected to her second Senate term in 2006, defeating former Eugene mayor Jim Torrey (R).

=== 2006 race for Governor ===
Walker was critical of Governor Ted Kulongoski, a fellow Democrat, on many issues and considered challenging his bid for re-election in 2006, but ultimately did not run.

On September 6, 2005, Walker stated, "I'm tired of the status quo, I'm not one of the good ol' boys. The good ol' boys have had a stranglehold over this state for a long time." Walker, who had run only for offices in the Willamette Valley, would have faced an uphill battle in a statewide race. Fellow Democrat Pete Sorenson, another Willamette Valley Democrat who did run for governor in 2006, predicted that Walker would have a hard time raising money for her campaign. A poll done by Mike Riley in late 2005 showed Walker and several other Democratic challengers in single digits.

Another factor that loomed over Walker's gubernatorial candidacy was the possibility that former two-term Governor John Kitzhaber might enter the race. A December 1, 2005 article asserted that Kitzhaber was considering challenging his successor, Kulongoski. Walker said "I wouldn't run against John Kitzhaber. That's the deciding factor."

On January 13, 2006, Kitzhaber said that he would not enter the race, leaving the door open for a possible run by Walker.

However, Walker announced on February 1, 2006 that she would not seek the office, but would instead listen to voters in her State Senate District and run for re-election.

=== Goldschmidt scandal ===
Walker, a sexual assault victim, is partially responsible for forcing former governor Neil Goldschmidt to admit publicly that he had a sexual relationship with a 14-year-old girl in 1975 which lasted three years. Goldschmidt was Mayor of Portland at the time the relationship took place. Walker received the information from Portland Tribune Columnist Phil Stanford about the scandal, though it reportedly was not enough proof to go public. Walker was a longtime critic of Goldschmidt and tried unsuccessfully to prevent his appointment to the Oregon State Board of Higher Education in January 2004.

A few months later, Walker passed the documents she had received from Stanford to a Willamette Week newspaper reporter. On May 6, 2004, Goldschmidt confessed publicly to the relationship after being told that an article in Willamette Week was going to be printed about the scandal. The story appeared in the paper less than a week later, and revealed that close friends and colleagues had kept quiet about the relationship for 30 years. Goldschmidt subsequently resigned from the Oregon State Bar and the Board of Higher Education.

=== Campaign for Secretary of State ===
At the conclusion of the 2007 legislative session, Walker announced her candidacy for Oregon Secretary of State in 2008. She finished third in the Democratic primary to Kate Brown and Rick Metsger.

=== Later career ===
In 2009, Walker was nominated by Governor Ted Kulongoski to a four-year term as chair of Oregon's Board of Parole and Post-Prison Supervision. She resigned from the Oregon State Senate on July 12, 2009, to begin her new position. In September of that year she withdrew herself for consideration for the position on the board prior to confirmation by the Oregon Senate. Walker did this after state government revenue forecasts determined the state would take in less money than anticipated, and thus a fourth position on the board would not be created as Governor Kulongoski had expected. Walker then took a temporary position with the parole board to last until the end of the year.

On October 30, 2009, U.S. Secretary of Agriculture Tom Vilsack announced that Walker had been appointed as Oregon State Director for Rural Development with the U.S. Department of Agriculture.

== Personal life ==
Walker and her husband Steven live in Eugene, and have two adult children, Adam and Sara.

== Electoral history ==
2006 Oregon State Senator, 7th district
Party	Candidate	Votes	%
Democratic	Vicki L. Walker	25,667	51.6
Republican	Jim Torrey	23,962	48.2
Write-in		134	0.3
Total votes		49,763	100%
