= George C. Brownell =

American politician (1858–1921)

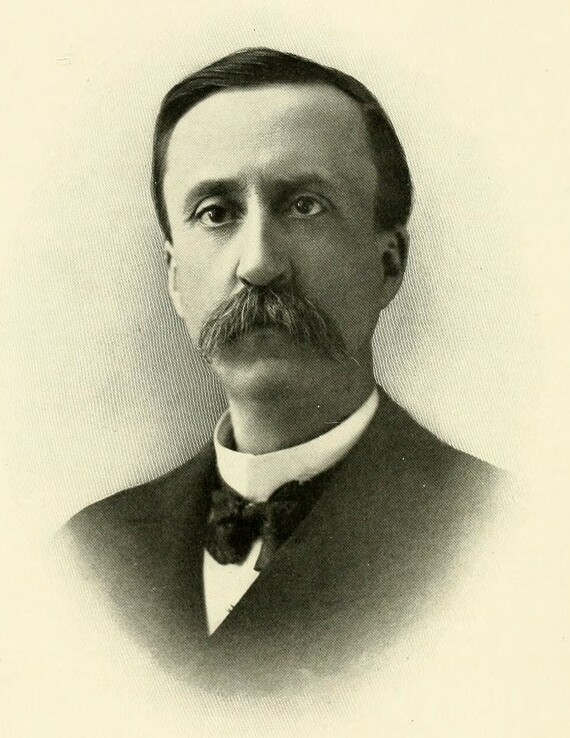
- Oregon senate president George Brownell

16th President of the Oregon State Senate
- In office 1903–1904
- Preceded by: Charles W. Fulton
- Succeeded by: William Kuykendall

Member of the Oregon Senate from the 3rd / 14th district
- In office 1895–1906
- Preceded by: Harvey E. Cross
- Succeeded by: Joseph E. Hedges
- Constituency: Clackamas County

Member of the Oregon House of Representatives from the 16th district
- In office 1917–1918
- Preceded by: Guy T. Hunt
- Succeeded by: Harvey E. Cross

Personal details
- Born: August 10, 1858 Willsboro, New York, U.S.
- Died: May 28, 1921 (aged 62) Oregon City, Oregon, U.S.
- Party: Republican
- Spouse: Alma C. Lane
- Profession: Lawyer

George Clayton Brownell (August 10, 1858 – May 28, 1921) was an American politician and attorney from Oregon City, Oregon. He was a conservative Republican who represented Clackamas County in both of Oregon's legislative chambers. He served three four-year terms in the Oregon State Senate and was senate president from 1903 through 1904. Brownell was defeated for re-election after he was implicated in a land fraud scheme, but was later exonerated when one of the convicted fraudsters admitted in court that he had forged Brownell's name on the incriminating documents without Brownell's knowledge or consent. Brownell remained very popular in Clackamas County throughout his life. He was elected mayor of Oregon City in 1910 and later served a two-year term in the Oregon House of Representatives.

== Early life ==
Brownell was born on August 10, 1858, in Willsboro, New York. He was the son of Ambrose Brownell and Annie (Smith) Brownell. His father was a mechanic who served in the Union Army during the American Civil War. Brownell attended public schools and academies in New York when he was growing up. He married Alma C. Lane on September 28, 1876, in Rockland, Massachusetts. Together, they had two sons.

Brownell studied law in Hudson, New York, under Charles Lewis Beale and was admitted to the New York bar in 1880. He moved to Frankfort, Kansas, in 1884, where he became a successful lawyer. Shortly after his arrival, the people of Frankfort elected him mayor. He won a second term a year later. In 1886, he moved to Ness City, Kansas, where he was attorney for the Denver, Memphis, and Atlantic Railroad. Later, he served two years as county attorney for Ness County, Kansas.

Brownell moved to Oregon in 1891, settling in Oregon City. He quickly became one of the community's most prominent attorneys. He attended the Clackamas County Republican convention in 1892. During the convention, Brownell was elected chairman of the county's Republican central committee and selected to lead the county's delegation at the state Republican convention that year. The convention also nominated him to run as the party's candidate for the state senate seat representing Clackamas County, but Brownell declined the nomination.

After arriving in Oregon City, Brownell became active in a number of community organizations. He was member of Elks, Knights of Pythias, Knights of the Maccabees, Woodsmen of the World, Ancient Order of United Workmen, and Improved Order of Red Men.

== State senator ==
Brownell served three four-year terms in the Oregon State Senate. Prior to each election, he was nominated unanimously by delegates at the Clackamas County Republican convention. He went on to win three general elections by solid majorities. During his tenue in the state senate, he served as president of the senate from 1903 through 1904. Brownell was defeated for re-election in 1906 after he was implicated in a land fraud scheme.

=== First term ===
In 1894, Brownell attended the Clackamas County Republican convention. The convention delegates nominated him by acclamation to be the party's candidate for the state senate representing Clackamas County. He accepted the nomination. Brownell was also selected to attend the state Republican convention as a Clackamas County delegate.

In the 1894 general election, Brownell defeated W. A. Starkweather, the People's Party candidate, by 327 votes. Brownell received 2,231 votes while Starkweather got 1,904. James Thorne, the Democratic Party candidate, finished third with 1,587 votes.

Brownell took his seat in the Oregon State Senate on January 14, 1895, representing Clackamas County's District 3. During the session, Brownell was appointed chairman of the senate's railroads committee. He was also a member of the judiciary committee and the medicine, pharmacy, and dentistry committee. The session lasted just under six weeks, adjourning on February 23.

Since Oregon state senators served four-year terms, Brownell did not need to run for re-election prior to the 1897 legislative session. The 19th Oregon Legislative Assembly began on January 11 with Brownell representing the Senate's District 3. Brownell was re-appointed chairman of the railroads committee. He was also appointed to the judiciary and roads and highways committees. Prior to the Seventeenth Amendment to the Constitution, United States senators were elected by state legislatures. In 1897, Republicans dominated both chambers of Oregon's legislature, but the Republicans were divided between supporters of incumbent United States Senator John H. Mitchell and supporters of Joseph Simon, the president of the Oregon State Senate. The State Senate was organized with a sizable pro-Mitchell majority, including Brownell, but the Oregon House of Representatives was closely divided between pro-Mitchell and anti-Mitchell legislators. The two House factions were unable to agree on a speaker. Instead, they met separately, and in unofficial sessions elected rival speakers. As a result, the legislature was unable elect a United States senator or pass any laws. The state senate finally adjourned on March 2.

On September 26, 1898, the Oregon legislature met in a special session to fill the United States Senate seat that had been vacant for almost two years, which Brownell attended. After much debate, the legislature elected Joseph Simon to fill the vacant Senate seat. The special session was adjourned on October 22.

=== Second term ===
At the Clackamas County Republican convention in 1898, Brownell was nominated for re-election to the District 3 State Senate seat without any opposition. Brownell was opposed in the general election by Charles Moran of the People's Party, W. W. Marrs representing the Prohibition Party, and William S. U'Ren who got support from the Democratic Party, factions of the People's, and some Silver Republicans. Brownell won re-election with 1,919 votes. U'Ren finished second with 1,706 followed by Moran with 250 and Marrs with 202 votes.

The 1899 legislative session began on January 9 with Brownell representing District 3 in the state senate. He was once again appointed chairman of the railroads committee and a member of the judiciary and the roads and highways committees. The session lasted just under six weeks, adjourning on February 18.

Once again, Brownell did not have to run for re-election prior to the 1901 legislative session because of his four-year term. While his Clackamas County constituency remained the same, Brownell now represented Senate District 14 due to redistricting. The 21st regular session of the Oregon legislature opened on January 14. During the session, Brownell continued to serve as chairman of the railroads committee and was appointed to the credentials, judiciary, and fishing industries committees. The session finished its work and was adjourned on March 4.

=== Third term ===
In 1902, Clackamas County Republicans once again nominated Brownell for the county's senate seat without opposition. He won the general election with 2,130 votes followed by George W. Grace, the Citizens Party candidate, with 1,530. There were two minor candidates who finished far behind, Fred J. Meindi, who received 270 votes, and Caius W. Herman, who got 117 votes.

Newspapers reported that Brownell was one of two contenders for senate president. The other senator highlighted as a contender was Andrew C. Smith, a doctor from Multnomah County. The competition between Brownell and Smith was intense; nevertheless, Brownell expressed confidence that he would be elected senate president. Brownell was ultimately elected president of the senate after 18 ballots in the senate's Republican caucus.

When Oregon's 23rd legislative session was opened on January 12, Brownell was officially elected president of the senate. A few days later he announced the senate committee appointments. The most important responsibility of the legislature during the 1903 session was to elect a United States senator. Brownell supported Charles W. Fulton, who had been president of the state senate during the previous session. On the initial ballot Fulton got the most votes (29); however, 46 votes were needed to be elected. After gaining a few more votes, Fulton stalled at 33. However, he was finally elected to the United States Senate on the 42nd ballot, which occurred on the last day of legislative session. After the election was finalized, Brownell adjourned the senate on February 20. Later in 1903, Brownell presided over a brief special session that lasted from December 21 to 23.

Because he was mid-way through his four-year term, Brownell did not have to run for re-election prior to the 1905 legislative session. When the session opened on January 9, Brownell was elected temporary president. In that capacity, he was responsible for overseeing the election of senate officers, which was completed on the first day. During the session he served as chairman of the election and privileges committee. He was also a member of the judiciary, railroads, and fishing industries committees. The senate was adjourned on February 17.

=== 1906 election ===
The 1906 election was a major reversal of fortune for Brownell. While he ran for re-election, he was opposed in the Republican primary by L. L. Porter, the editor of the Oregon City Enterprise, one of the city's two big newspapers. Previously, Brownell had received unwavering support from both the Enterprise and the other major newspaper, the Oregon City Courier. However, because Brownell had been implicated in a land fraud scheme, both newspapers published numerous scathing articles about Brownell prior to the 1906 election. Nevertheless, Brownell won the Republican primary with a solid majority. He received 1,583 votes (over 60 percent of the votes cast) while Porter got 1,010.

In the 1906 general election, Brownell lost to his Democratic challenger, Joseph E. Hodges. Hodges received 2,361 votes followed by Brownell with 1,806 votes. Two minor candidates came in far behind, William Beard, a socialist candidate, got 251 votes and N. F. Nelson, an independent, received 115. After the election, the state's largest newspaper, The Oregonian, published its opinion that after twelve successful years in the state senate, Brownell's loss was the result of his unresolved federal indictment.

== Land fraud scandal ==
From 1904 through early 1910, the federal government prosecuted a number of individuals for contributing to a large-scale land fraud scheme. The fraud focused on the Homestead Acts, which allowed the sale of public land to American families. The criminal offenses were the result of speculators filing fraudulent homestead claims and then bribing United States General Land Office officials to approve the claims. Once the land patents were approved, the property was sold to lumber companies and large livestock operations for a substantial profit for those engaged in the fraud. As a result, large tracts of valuable timber and grazing land were swindled from the United States public. The first grand jury indictments in the land fraud case began in 1903. John H. Mitchell, one of Oregon's incumbent United States senators was convicted in 1905. Over the next few years, a dozen well-known individuals were also indicted. The final federal prosecutions was conducted in early 1910.

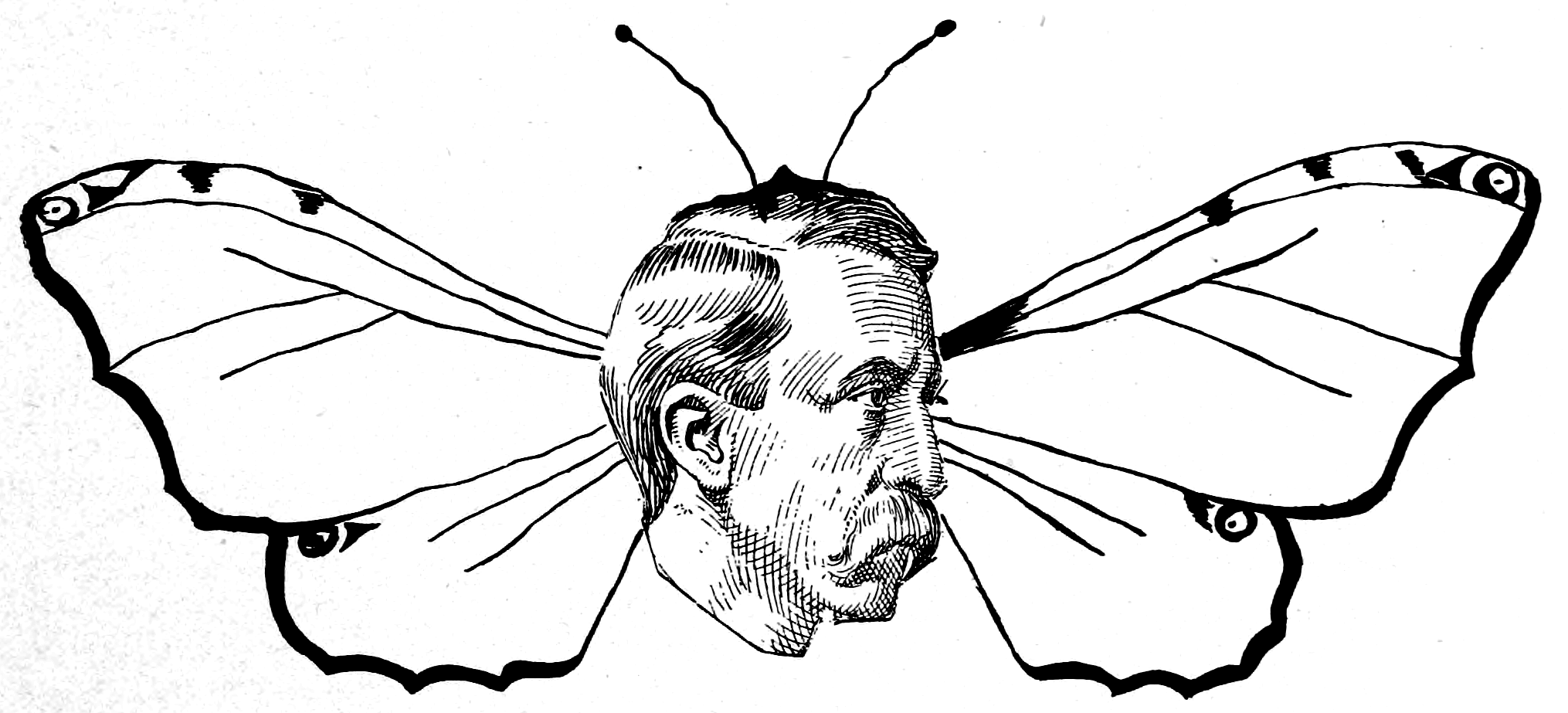
Cartoon shows Brownell as a "Pretty Moth"

Brownell was one of those caught up in the scandal. However, it was later proven that he had no part in the fraud. In the trial against former United States attorney John Hicklin Hall, federal prosecutor Francis J. Heney got former state surveyor-general Henry Meldrum to admit in open court that he had forged Brownell's name on incriminating documents used to support the fraudulent land claims. Based on that admission, all charges against Brownell were dropped. During the trial, it also came to light that in 1903, Hall had used the threat of exposing the forged documents to ruin Brownell's political career unless Brownell withdrew from consideration for appointment to the United States attorney position that both Hall and Brownell were seeking. To protect his reputation, Brownell yielded to the blackmail and declined to pursue the United States attorney position, for which he was well qualified. While Brownell was publicly cleared of all wrongdoing, his reputation never fully recovered from the years spent under the cloud of scandal. For example, a cartoon published in Stephen Puter's 1908 book Looters of the Public Domain showed Brownell as the "Pretty Moth of Oregon politics" that flew too close to the land fraud limelight.

== Law and politics ==
After leaving the state senate, Brownell returned to his law practice in Oregon City. He also continued to be a sought-after public speaker. Many of his public speeches were reported in local newspapers, often in great detail.

In 1910, Brownell announced that he had decided not to run for the Clackamas County state senate seat that he had previously held. This was a surprise, since he remained very popular throughout Clackamas County. According to local newspapers, Brownell would have been easily elected to the state senate had he run in 1910. Instead, Brownell decided to run for mayor of Oregon City. He was elected to that position, receiving almost 80 percent of the votes cast. He got 617 votes against his opponent J. J. Cooke, who received 117 votes. After a very successful term as Oregon City's mayor, Brownell decided not to run for re-election.

In 1914, Brownell decided to run for the Republican nomination for governor. The focus of his platform was alcohol prohibition, women's suffrage, low taxes, and the streamlining of state government. In the Republican primary, Brownell finished last in a field of eight candidates for governor. He received 5,147 votes. James Withycombe won the Republican primary with 20,034 votes. Later that year in the general election, Withycombe was elected governor.

Despite losing the race for governor, Brownell stayed active in politics and civic affairs. He also remained a popular public speaker and endorsed candidates for local offices.

== State representative ==
In 1916, Brownell decided to run for state office once again, this time for a seat in the Oregon House of Representatives. There were five candidates seeking the Republican nomination for three Clackamas County state representative seats. In addition to Brownell, Henry A. Dedman, E. D. Olds, C. Schuebel, and Harold C. Stephens were in the Republican primary race. Dedman won the primary with 3,405 votes. Brownell was second with 2,902 votes, followed by Stephens with 2,583 votes. Schuebel ran fourth with 2,305 votes, and Olds was last, with 1,597 votes. The three top candidates went forward to the general election, while Schuebel and Olds were eliminated. In the Democratic primary, Brownell won one of that party's three nominations with write-in votes. The other two Democratic nominees were J. E. Jack and E. C. Latourette. In the general election, the three Republicans won the Clackamas County seats. Dedman got 6,934 votes, followed by Stephens with 6,247 and Brownell with 6,016 votes. Jack was the top Democrat, with 5,121 votes.

Brownell took his House District 16 seat on January 8, when Oregon's 1917 legislative session opened for business. During the session, Brownell served as chairman of the cities and towns committee. He was also appointed to the judiciary and immigration committees. Brownell introduced a bill to abolish and consolidate state commissions and committees. The House speaker appointed Brownell chairman of a special House committee to recommend organizations for consolidation or elimination. A Senate committee was also appointed, headed by Walter A. Dimick, who represented Clackamas County in Brownell's old District 14 seat. The House and Senate committees disagreed on the process for reviewing state commissions, so the legislature was unable to make any changes to the state bureaucracy. The session lasted six weeks and was adjourned on February 19.

Instead of running for re-election to the Oregon House of Representatives in 1918, Brownell decided to seek his old District 14 senate seat. To return to the Senate, he needed to defeat the incumbent Republican, Walter Dimick. Dimick won the Republican primary, with 2,799 votes against Brownell's 1,417.

== Later life ==
During World War I, Brownell served as chairman of the speakers' committee that led the campaign to sell war bonds in Clackamas County. After the war, Brownell spoke in favor of a bonus for veterans.

Brownell continued his law practice in Oregon City. He also remained an advocate for local issues. For example, he actively campaigned for good roads. In addition, he remained active in a number of fraternal lodges including the local Elks, the Knights of Pythias, the Knights of the Maccabees, the Woodsmen of the World, and Improved Order of Red Men. Over his lifetime, he built and maintained a private library near Oregon City, considered by the Oregon City Enterprise to be one of the finest in the state. Brownell also remained very popular with the citizens of Clackamas County. In 1920, the Oregon City Enterprise speculated that Brownell might be a candidate for the position of Clackamas County judge.

Brownell died in an Oregon City hospital on May 28, 1921, after a prolonged illness, aged 62. A public funeral service was held on May 31 at the Oregon City Elks temple. The pallbearers were from the Clackamas County Bar Association. The service was attended by an overflow crowd of local citizens. After the public funeral, a private ceremony was held at a Portland crematorium.

On June 3, 1921, the Clackamas County Bar Association passed a resolution honoring Brownell for his distinguished public service. On June 7, all the businesses in Oregon City closed for an afternoon in honor of Brownell's death. The state circuit court was also closed and flags were flown at half-staff throughout the city. On June 10, the Oregon City Enterprise dedicated an entire page to honoring Brownell. Additional tribute letters continued to arrive at the newspaper for several months after Brownell's death.
