= Kitty Piercy =

American politician (born 1942)

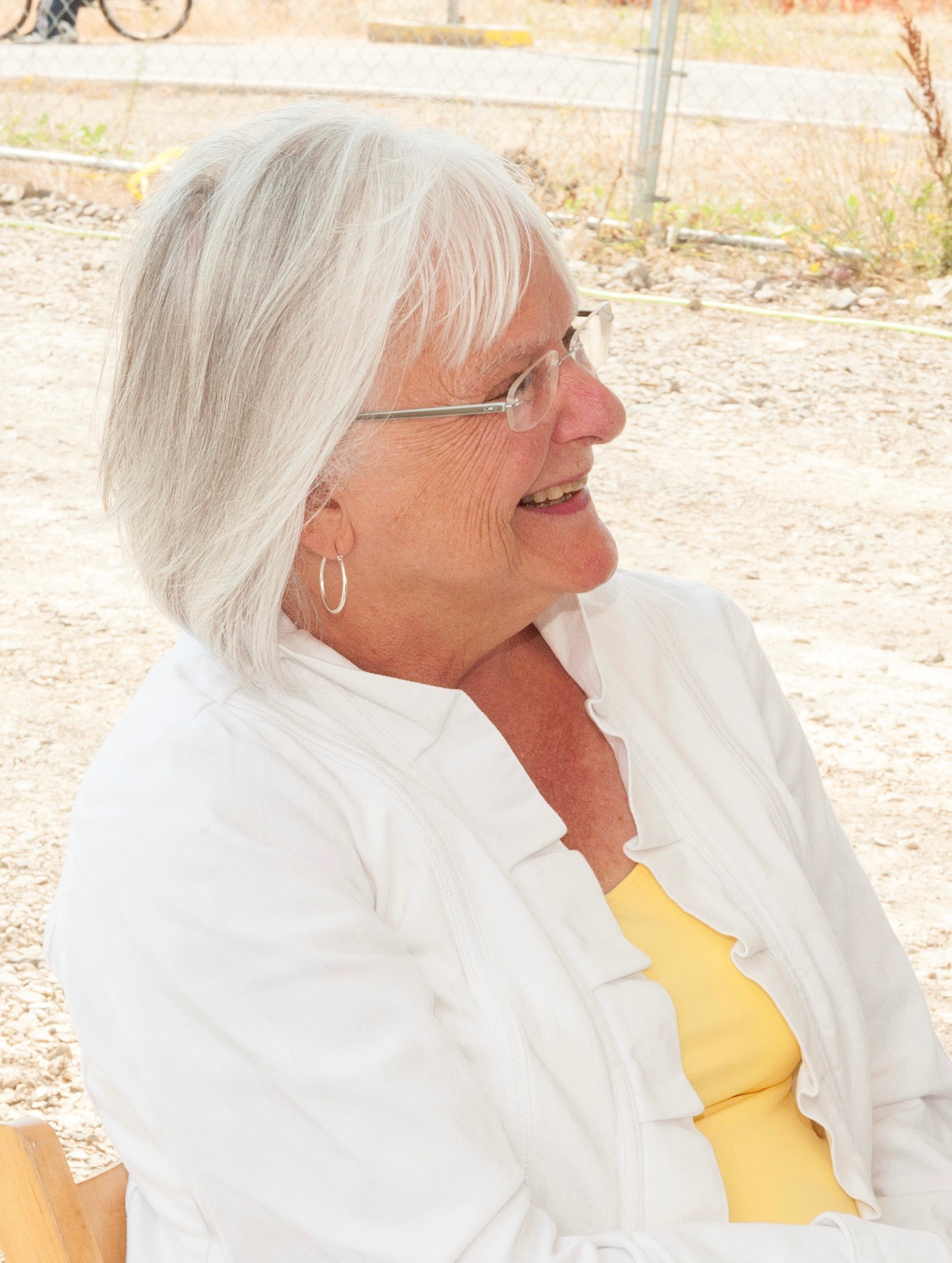
- Piercy in 2013

Mayor of Eugene
- In office January 1, 2005 – January 9, 2017
- Preceded by: Jim Torrey
- Succeeded by: Lucy Vinis

Personal details
- Born: July 6, 1942 (age 84) Tampa, Florida, U.S.
- Party: Democratic
- Spouse: David Piercy (m. 1970)
- Children: Andrew, Vincent, and Jessica
- Education: Western Michigan University
- Profession: Politician

Catherine "Kitty" Piercy (born July 6, 1942) is an American politician. She was elected mayor of Eugene, Oregon in 2004, and was re-elected in 2008, and again in 2012, serving three full terms until January 2017. During the 1990s she served as Minority Leader of the Oregon House of Representatives.

== Oregon State Legislature ==
Piercy was elected state representative in 1994, 1996, and 1998, serving from 1995–2000, for House District 39 serving West Eugene, River Road and Santa Clara. She served for the maximum three consecutive two-year terms. She served as both assistant caucus leader and Minority Leader in 1999. She was elected assistant Democratic leader in her second term and leader in her third term.

== Climate change ==
Piercy has been concerned with the issues of sustainability and climate change. Early in her first term she assembled a broad group of stakeholders into a forum called the Sustainable Business Initiative, one of whose recommendations was to create the city's Sustainability Commission, which Council officially created in 2007.

In 2005 Piercy became an early signatory of the US Mayors Climate Protection Agreement. As of 2012 over 900 mayors had signed the Agreement.

== Eugene issues ==
=== West Eugene EmX ===
Piercy supported the west Eugene extension of Lane Transit District's bus rapid transit system, having voted for it in her capacity as city representative to the regional Metropolitan Planning Commission.

=== Proposed city tax for schools ===
While Piercy was mayor, a local income tax to fund schools was proposed, but defeated.

=== Pledge of Allegiance controversy ===
While Piercy was mayor, a proposal to have Eugene council members begin saying the Pledge of Allegiance prior to council meetings on days of national patriotic importance was passed. Piercy said that the measure was likely to be divisive: "If there's one thing the flag stands for, it's that people don't have to be compelled to say the Pledge of Allegiance or anything else." Supporters of the measure said that objecting to it "vindicates all of us who say our Judeo-Christian heritage is under attack."
