= Mark Callahan =

American politician

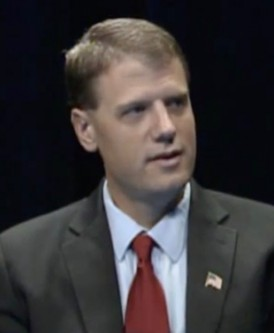
- Callahan in 2015

Personal details
- Born: Mark Allen Callahan; May 11, 1977 (age 49) San Diego, California, U.S.
- Party: Republican (2011–present)
- Other political affiliations: Democratic (before 2010); Oregon Independent (2010); Green (2010–2011)
- Spouse: Sherry (div. 2013)
- Children: 2
- Education: Oregon State University, Corvallis (BS)
- Website: Campaign website

Mark Allen Callahan (born May 11, 1977) is an American information technology consultant and perennial candidate. He was the Republican nominee in the 2016 United States Senate election in Oregon.

== Political career ==
Callahan is known as a perennial candidate, having frequently sought office since 2009 in both Oregon and most recently in Texas.

Callahan sought appointment to a seat in the Oregon Senate in 2009 as a Democrat.

In 2010, he ran for the Lane County Commission. Later in 2010, Callahan ran for the Oregon House of Representatives, unsuccessfully seeking the nomination of the Independent Party of Oregon before receiving the nomination of the Pacific Green Party, in what he later said was an attempt to take away votes from the Democratic incumbent, Nancy Nathanson, in order to help the Republican nominee win. The attempt was unsuccessful.

In 2011, Callahan unsuccessfully sought a school board seat in Eugene. His then-wife, Sherry, also unsuccessfully ran for a different seat on the board in the same election.

In 2012, Callahan ran for President of the United States as a Republican. He filed to run in both the New Hampshire and Arizona primaries.

Later in 2012, Callahan won the Republican nomination without opposition for the same Oregon House of Representatives seat he had sought in 2010, losing again to Nancy Nathanson in the general election.

In 2014, Callahan sought the Republican nomination for the U.S. Senate, receiving nearly 7% of the vote and coming in third place, behind Jason Conger and eventual nominee Monica Wehby. During this campaign, Callahan was featured on Fox News after an argument with Nigel Jaquiss, a reporter, resulted in him being kicked out of a Willamette Week editorial interview.

In 2015, Callahan unsuccessfully sought a seat on the Mt. Hood Community College Board of Directors.

In 2016, Callahan received the Republican nomination for the U.S. Senate, winning the primary with 38% of the vote. He won the primary over businessman Sam Carpenter, Lane County Commissioner Faye Stewart, and business consultant Dan Laschober. He lost the general election to the Democratic nominee, incumbent U.S. Senator Ron Wyden.

In 2017, Callahan unsuccessfully sought to become chair of the Oregon Republican Party.

Callahan ran for Oregon's 5th congressional district in 2018. He won the Republican nomination in May 2018, but was defeated by Democrat Kurt Schrader in the November general election.

Callahan relocated to Montgomery, TX and ran in the GOP primary in May 2022 for GOP Precinct Chair, Precinct No. 11. Callahan garnered just above 10% of the vote and lost to the GOP nominee Marliese' Stripling, receiving just above 70% of total votes.

=== Political positions ===
Callahan stated he is "focusing on the pressing issues and problems that are facing Oregonians right now, and am committed to finding and pursuing real solutions for our state." During the 2016 United States presidential election, he volunteered for the campaign of Ted Cruz.

Callahan supports implementing a flat tax. He also supports implementing term limits for members of Congress, and is opposed to illegal immigration. Callahan is opposed to both the North American Free Trade Agreement and the Trans-Pacific Partnership. When asked about climate change in a 2014 interview, he said, "it's a myth".

=== Campaign financing ===
In January 2017, The Register Guard reported that Callahan received Supplemental Nutrition Assistance Program (SNAP) benefits - also known as "food stamps" - shortly after funding his 2014 U.S. Senate campaign. Callahan "poured $9,090 of his own money into his candidacy and loaned his campaign another $6,500, according to federal campaign finance records" making him the top contributor to his campaign. Callahan reportedly admitted to receiving food stamps stating, "The amount of SNAP benefits I received after the primary election was very meager in comparison to others." Callahan has reportedly not held a full-time job since 2014.

In a 2014 court filing, Callahan wrote that he was claiming unemployment benefits as well. According to The Register Guard, "Callahan requested to go part time at his network administrator job at a Portland technology company 'to allow time for me to be active in my campaign for the U.S. Senate.'" Callahan further claimed that he was laid off from his network administrator job on March 21, 2014, because his employer needed a full-time person. In 2016 while running for U.S. Senate and volunteering in Oregon for Senator Ted Cruz's presidential campaign, Callahan contributed $2,700 directly and loaned his personal campaign $6,100. He later repaid himself $4,100 of that loan.

== Personal life ==
Callahan has two daughters, and divorced in 2013. His ex-wife, Sherry, supported his 2014 U.S. Senate campaign.

== Electoral history ==
2010 Lane County Commission election
Party	Candidate	Votes	%
Nonpartisan	Sid Leiken	5,103	42.10
Nonpartisan	Pat Riggs-Henson	3,306	27.27
Nonpartisan	Joe Pishioneri	2,061	17.00
Nonpartisan	Dave Ralston	845	6.97
Nonpartisan	Patrick Hurley	332	2.74
Nonpartisan	Mark Callahan	263	2.17
Nonpartisan	Michael Tayloe	181	1.49
	write-ins	31	0.26
Total votes		12,122	100.00

2010 Oregon House of Representatives Independent primary election
Party	Candidate	Votes	%
Independent Party	Nancy Nathanson	20	52.63
Independent Party	Mark Callahan	16	42.10
	None of the above	1	2.63
	write-ins	1	2.63
Total votes		38	100.00

2010 Oregon House of Representatives District 13 general election
Party	Candidate	Votes	%
Democratic	Nancy Nathanson	15,967	64.79
Republican	Bill Young	7,890	32.01
Pacific Green	Mark Callahan	749	3.04
	write-ins	40	0.16
Total votes		24,646	100.00

2011 Eugene School District #4J, place 4 election
Party	Candidate	Votes	%
Nonpartisan	Craig Smith	15,279	52.51
Nonpartisan	Mark Callahan	6,212	21.35
Nonpartisan	Linda Hamilton	5,120	17.59
Nonpartisan	Natasha Hennings	2,286	7.86
	write-ins	203	0.70
Total votes		29,100	100.00

2012 Oregon House of Representatives District 13 general election
Party	Candidate	Votes	%
Democratic	Nancy Nathanson	19,110	68.70
Republican	Mark Callahan	8,651	31.10
	write-ins	56	0.20
Total votes		27,817	100.00

2014 U.S. Senate Republican primary election
Party	Candidate	Votes	%
Republican	Monica Wehby	134,627	49.96
Republican	Jason Conger	101,401	37.63
Republican	Mark Callahan	18,220	6.76
Republican	Jo Rae Perkins	7,602	2.82
Republican	Tim Crawley	6,566	2.44
	write-ins	1,027	0.38
Total votes		266,438	100.00

2015 Mt. Hood Community College Board of Directors, Zone 3 election
Party	Candidate	Votes	%
Nonpartisan	Teena Ainslie	1,903	46.93
Nonpartisan	Mark Callahan	1,653	40.76
Nonpartisan	Pat Edwards	446	11.00
Nonpartisan	Write-ins	53	1.31
Total votes		3,533	100.00

2016 U.S. Senate Republican primary election
Party	Candidate	Votes	%
Republican	Mark Callahan	123,473	38.24
Republican	Sam Carpenter	104,494	32.36
Republican	Faye Stewart	57,399	17.78
Republican	Dan Laschober	34,157	10.58
	write-ins	3,357	1.04
Total votes		322,880	100.00

2016 U.S. Senate general election
Party	Candidate	Votes	%
Democratic	Ron Wyden	1,105,119	56.60
Republican	Mark Callahan	651,106	33.35
Working Families	Shanti Lewallen	61,915	3.17
Independent Party	Steven Reynolds	59,516	3.05
Pacific Green	Eric Navickas	48,823	2.50
Libertarian	Jim Lindsay	23,941	1.23
	write-ins	2,058	0.10
Total votes		1,952,478	100.00

2018 U.S. House of Representatives District 5 Republican primary election
Party	Candidate	Votes	%
Republican	Mark Callahan	33,933	61.90
Republican	Joey Nations	11,300	20.61
Republican	Robert Reynolds	9,120	16.64
	write-ins	465	0.85
Total votes		54,818	100.00

Oregon's 5th congressional district election, 2018
Party	Candidate	Votes	%
Democratic	Kurt Schrader (incumbent)	197,187	55.01
Republican	Mark Callahan	149,887	41.81
Libertarian	Dan Souza	6,054	1.69
Pacific Green	Marvin Sandnes	4,802	1.34
n/a	Write-ins	539	0.15
Total votes		358,469	100.00

Party political offices
Preceded by Jim Huffman	Republican nominee for U.S. Senator from Oregon (Class 3); 2016	Succeeded by Jo Rae Perkins
