= 2020 Oregon House of Representatives election =

- November 3, 2020

All 60 seats in the Oregon House of Representatives 31 seats needed for a majority
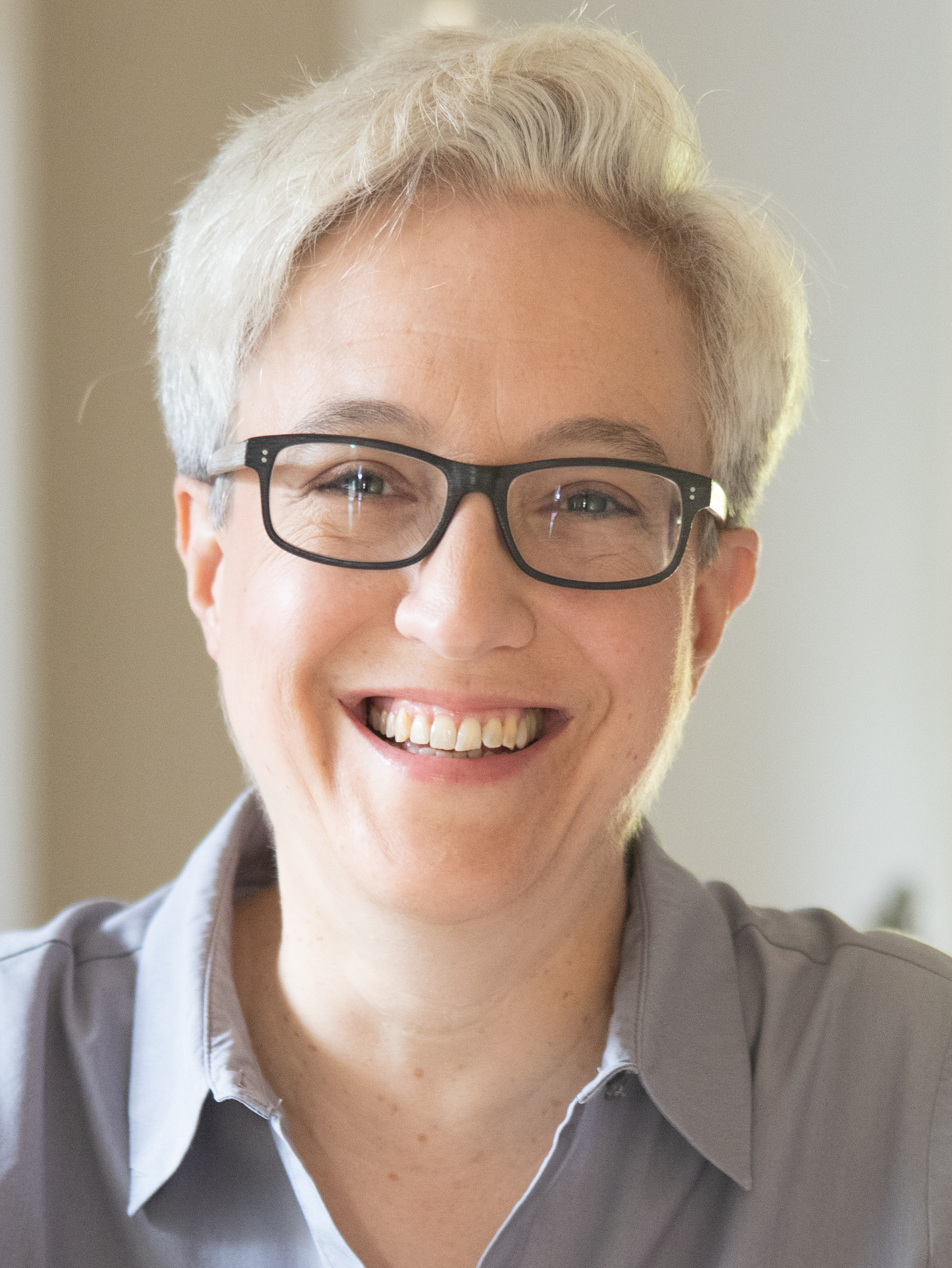

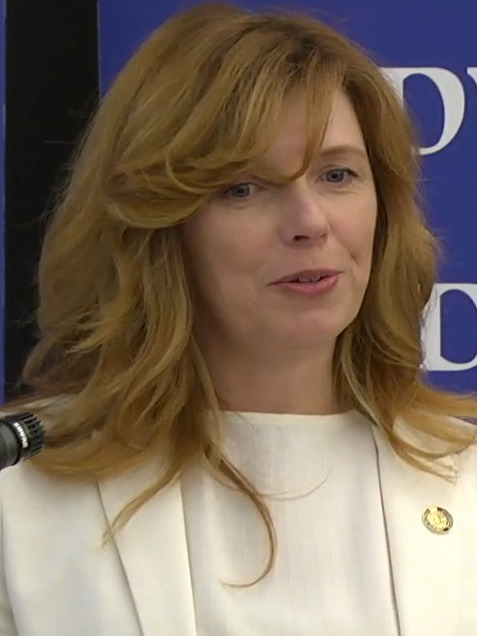
	Majority party	Minority party
Leader	Tina Kotek	Christine Drazan
Party	Democratic	Republican
Leader since	January 2011	September 16, 2019
Leader's seat	44th-N/NE Portland	39th-Canby
Last election	38 seats, 56.9%	22 seats, 39.5%
Seats won	37	23
Seat change	▼1	▲1
Popular vote	1,210,848	958,075
Percentage	55.03%	43.54%
Swing	▼1.91%	▲4.00%
- Results; Democratic gain Republican gain Democratic hold Republican hold
Speaker before election
Tina Kotek
Democratic
Elected Speaker
Tina Kotek
Democratic

The 2020 Oregon House of Representatives election were held on Tuesday, November 3, 2020, with the primary election being held on May 19, 2020. Voters in the 60 districts of the Oregon House of Representatives elected their representatives. The elections coincided with the elections for other offices, including for the Oregon State Senate and for U.S. President.

The Democratic Party kept their majority. The Oregon Legislature does not have term limits.

11 new representatives were elected this cycle (3 Republicans and 8 Democrats). 10 were elected to seats open due to retirements while 1 (Jason Kropf of Bend) defeated an incumbent.

== Background ==
Democrats have held the Oregon House since 2007 and the chamber was not considered competitive in 2020.

== Retirements ==
3 Republicans and 7 Democrats did not run for re-election to their House seat this cycle.

=== Republicans ===
1. Carl Wilson (District 3) retired
2. Sherrie Sprenger (District 17) retired
3. Greg Barreto (District 58) retired

=== Democrats ===
1. Caddy McKeown (District 9) retired
2. Tiffiny Mitchell (District 32) declined to run for re-election due to moving out of state for her spouse's job
3. Margaret Doherty (District 35) retired
4. Akasha Lawrence-Spence (District 36) declined to run for re-election due to redistricting
5. Alissa Keny-Guyer (District 46) declined to run for re-election due to moving out of state
6. Chris Gorsek (District 49) retired to run for Senate in District 25
7. Carla Piluso (District 50) retired

== Flips ==
One incumbent was defeated: Deschutes County deputy district attorney and Democrat Jason Kropf defeated incumbent Republican Cheri Helt in District 54.

Meanwhile, Republicans Boomer Wright and Suzanne Weber won elections for vacant seats in District 9 and District 32, respectively, bringing Republicans' net seat gain to +1.

== Electoral system ==
The 60 members of the Oregon State House are elected from single-member districts by first-past-the-post voting to two-year terms. Contested nominations of the Democratic and Republican parties for each district were determined by an open primary election. Minor-party and independent candidates were nominated by petition and write-in candidates had to file a request with the Secretary of State's office for votes for them to be counted.

== Predictions ==
Source	Ranking	As of
The Cook Political Report	Likely D	October 21, 2020

== Results summary ==
Results
Affiliation	Candidates	Votes	Vote %	Seats Won
Democratic	60	1,210,848	55.03%	37
Republican	53	958,075	43.54%	23
Libertarian	8	13,595	0.62%	0
Pacific Green	2	2,463	0.11%	0
Working Families	1	5,264	0.24%	0
Write-in	N/A	10,226	0.46%	0
Total	124	2,200,471	100.00%	60

== Close races ==
Districts where the margin of victory was under 10%:

1. District 52, 0.21%
2. District 31, 1.2%
3. District 20, 3.94%
4. District 11, 4.32%
5. District 10, 4.93%
6. District 50, 7.3%
7. District 32, 8.44%
8. District 19, 8.96%
9. District 40, 9.37%
10. District 51, 9.68%

== Results by district ==
=== 1st District ===
General election results
Party	Candidate	Votes	%
Republican	David Brock Smith	28,125	68.85%
Democratic	Calla Felicity	12,659	30.99%
Write-in		65	0.16%
Total votes		40,849	100.00%

=== 2nd District ===
General election results
Party	Candidate	Votes	%
Republican	Gary Leif	24,341	71.62%
Democratic	Charles Lee	9,546	28.09%
Write-in		101	0.30%
Total votes		33,988	100.00%

=== 3rd District ===
General election results
Party	Candidate	Votes	%
Republican	Lily Morgan	24,609	66.75%
Democratic	Jerry Morgan	12,081	32.77%
Write-in		178	0.48%
Total votes		36,868	100.00%

=== 4th District ===
General election results
Party	Candidate	Votes	%
Republican	Duane Stark	26,199	68.92%
Democratic	Mary Middleton	11,757	30.93%
Write-in		58	0.15%
Total votes		38,014	100.00%

=== 5th District ===
General election results
Party	Candidate	Votes	%
Democratic	Pam Marsh	27,069	66.36%
Republican	Sandra Abercrombie	13,678	33.53%
Write-in		47	0.12%
Total votes		40,794	100.00%

=== 6th District ===
General election results
Party	Candidate	Votes	%
Republican	Kim Wallan	18,673	54.57%
Democratic	Alberto Enriquez	14,748	43.10%
Libertarian	Alex Levi Usselman	779	2.28%
Write-in		21	0.06%
Total votes		34,221	100.00%

=== 7th District ===
General election results
Party	Candidate	Votes	%
Republican	Cedric Ross Hayden	25,076	67.76%
Democratic	Jerry Samaniego	11,861	32.05%
Write-in		69	0.19%
Total votes		37,006	100.00%

=== 8th District ===
General election results
Party	Candidate	Votes	%
Democratic	Paul Holvey	27,886	67.69%
Republican	Timothy Aldal	11,993	29.11%
Libertarian	Martha A Sherwood	1,239	3.01%
Write-in		76	0.18%
Total votes		41,194	100.00%

=== 9th District ===
General election results
Party	Candidate	Votes	%
Republican	Boomer Wright	21,724	57.54%
Democratic	Cal Mukumoto	15,988	42.35%
Write-in		44	0.12%
Total votes		37,756	100.00%
Republican gain from Democratic			

=== 10th District ===
General election results
Party	Candidate	Votes	%
Democratic	David Gomberg	20,294	52.31%
Republican	Max Sherman	18,383	47.38%
Write-in		119	0.31%
Total votes		38,796	100.00%

=== 11th District ===
General election results
Party	Candidate	Votes	%
Democratic	Marty Wilde	19,552	52.07%
Republican	Katie Boshart Glaser	17,928	47.75%
Write-in		69	0.18%
Total votes		37,549	100.00%

=== 12th District ===
General election results
Party	Candidate	Votes	%
Democratic	John Lively	18,227	56.61%
Republican	Ruth Linoz	13,883	43.11%
Write-in		90	0.28%
Total votes		32,200	100.00%

=== 13th District ===
General election results
Party	Candidate	Votes	%
Democratic	Nancy Nathanson	27,723	70.60%
Republican	David J Smith	11,488	29.26%
Write-in		54	0.14%
Total votes		39,265	100.00%

=== 14th District ===
General election results
Party	Candidate	Votes	%
Democratic	Julie Fahey	21,669	59.11%
Republican	Rich Cunningham	14,900	40.64%
Write-in		92	0.25%
Total votes		36,661	100.00%

=== 15th District ===
General election results
Party	Candidate	Votes	%
Republican	Shelly Boshart Davis	23,481	59.72%
Democratic	Miriam Cummins	15,747	40.05%
Write-in		90	0.23%
Total votes		39,318	100.00%

=== 16th District ===
General election results
Party	Candidate	Votes	%
Democratic	Dan Rayfield	25,742	75.86%
Republican	Jason Hughes	8,099	23.87%
Write-in		91	0.27%
Total votes		33,932	100.00%

=== 17th District ===
General election results
Party	Candidate	Votes	%
Republican	Jami Cate	26,398	69.22%
Democratic	Paige Hook	10,988	28.81%
Green	Timothy L Dehne	693	1.82%
Write-in		60	0.16%
Total votes		38,139	100.00%

=== 18th District ===
General election results
Party	Candidate	Votes	%
Republican	Rick Lewis	25,996	70.20%
Democratic	Jamie Morrison	10,933	29.53%
Write-in		100	0.27%
Total votes		37,029	100.00%

=== 19th District ===
General election results
Party	Candidate	Votes	%
Republican	Raquel Moore-Green	20,659	54.37%
Democratic	Jacqueline Leung	17,253	45.41%
Write-in		86	0.23%
Total votes		37,998	100.00%

=== 20th District ===
General election results
Party	Candidate	Votes	%
Democratic	Paul Evans	20,573	51.84%
Republican	Selma Pierce	19,012	47.90%
Write-in		102	0.26%
Total votes		39,687	100.00%

=== 21st District ===
General election results
Party	Candidate	Votes	%
Democratic	Brian Clem	16,433	60.58%
Republican	Jack Esp	10,610	39.11%
Write-in		84	0.31%
Total votes		27,127	100.00%

=== 22nd District ===
General election results
Party	Candidate	Votes	%
Democratic	Teresa Alonso Leon	12,168	56.74%
Republican	Anna Kasachev	9,218	42.98%
Write-in		59	0.28%
Total votes		21,445	100.00%

=== 23rd District ===
General election results
Party	Candidate	Votes	%
Republican	Mike Nearman	23,884	58.33%
Democratic	Sean Scorvo	14,292	34.90%
Green	Alex Polikoff	1,770	4.32%
Libertarian	Scott D Clawson	963	2.35%
Write-in		37	0.09%
Total votes		40,946	100.00%

=== 24th District ===
General election results
Party	Candidate	Votes	%
Republican	Ron Noble	21,427	57.64%
Democratic	Lynette Shaw	15,675	42.17%
Write-in		72	0.19%
Total votes		37,174	100.00%

=== 25th District ===
General election results
Party	Candidate	Votes	%
Republican	Bill Post	20,421	56.58%
Democratic	Ramiro Navarro Jr.	15,613	43.26%
Write-in		57	0.16%
Total votes		36,091	100.00%

=== 26th District ===
General election results
Party	Candidate	Votes	%
Democratic	Courtney Neron Misslin	23,815	54.05%
Republican	Peggy Stevens	19,201	43.58%
Libertarian	Tim E Nelson	1,002	2.27%
Write-in		40	0.09%
Total votes		44,058	100.00%

=== 27th District ===
General election results
Party	Candidate	Votes	%
Democratic	Sheri Schouten	25,539	69.31%
Republican	Sandra Nelson	11,257	30.55%
Write-in		53	0.14%
Total votes		36,849	100.00%

=== 28th District ===
General election results
Party	Candidate	Votes	%
Democratic	Wlnsvey Campos	21,563	65.15%
Republican	Daniel Martin	11,462	34.63%
Write-in		73	0.22%
Total votes		33,098	100.00%

=== 29th District ===
General election results
Party	Candidate	Votes	%
Democratic	Susan McLain	17,200	57.78%
Republican	Dale Fishback	12,507	42.01%
Write-in		63	0.21%
Total votes		29,770	100.00%

=== 30th District ===
General election results
Party	Candidate	Votes	%
Democratic	Janeen Sollman	25,837	93.18%
Write-in		1,892	6.82%
Total votes		27,729	100.00%

=== 31st District ===
General election results
Party	Candidate	Votes	%
Democratic	Bradley Witt	21,536	50.53%
Republican	Brian Stout	21,025	49.33%
Write-in		59	0.14%
Total votes		42,620	100.00%

=== 32nd District ===
General election results
Party	Candidate	Votes	%
Republican	Suzanne Weber	21,941	54.12%
Democratic	Debbie Booth-Schmidt	18,520	45.68%
Write-in		81	0.20%
Total votes		40,542	100.00%
Republican gain from Democratic			

=== 33rd District ===
General election results
Party	Candidate	Votes	%
Democratic	Maxine Dexter	33,707	75.64%
Republican	Dick Courter	10,796	24.23%
Write-in		59	0.13%
Total votes		44,562	100.00%

=== 34th District ===
General election results
Party	Candidate	Votes	%
Democratic	Ken Helm	26,867	96.74%
Write-in		904	3.26%
Total votes		27,771	100.00%

=== 35th District ===
General election results
Party	Candidate	Votes	%
Democratic	Dacia Grayber	27,771	67.13%
Republican	Bob Niemeyer	12,893	32.69%
Write-in		71	0.18%
Total votes		39,437	100.00%

=== 36th District ===
General election results
Party	Candidate	Votes	%
Democratic	Lisa Reynolds	34,577	83.06%
Republican	James A Ball	6,986	16.78%
Write-in		66	0.16%
Total votes		41,629	100.00%

=== 37th District ===
General election results
Party	Candidate	Votes	%
Democratic	Rachel Prusak	23,757	57.15%
Republican	Kelly Sloop	17,770	42.75%
Write-in		44	0.11%
Total votes		41,571	100.00%

=== 38th District ===
General election results
Party	Candidate	Votes	%
Democratic	Andrea Salinas	31,911	72.35%
Republican	Patrick Castles	12,152	27.55%
Write-in		43	0.10%
Total votes		44,106	100.00%

=== 39th District ===
General election results
Party	Candidate	Votes	%
Republican	Christine Drazan	26,202	62.22%
Democratic	Tessah Danel	14,985	35.58%
Libertarian	Kenny Sernach	868	2.06%
Write-in		57	0.14%
Total votes		42,112	100.00%

=== 40th District ===
General election results
Party	Candidate	Votes	%
Democratic	Mark Meek	21,168	54.60%
Republican	Josh Howard	17,535	45.23%
Write-in		63	0.16%
Total votes			100.00%

=== 41st District ===
General election results
Party	Candidate	Votes	%
Democratic	Karin Power	30,725	73.74%
Republican	Michael Newgard	10,878	26.11%
Write-in		62	0.15%
Total votes		41,665	100.00%

=== 42nd District ===
General election results
Party	Candidate	Votes	%
Democratic	Rob Nosse	40,456	98.19%
Write-in		744	1.81%
Total votes		41,200	100.00%

=== 43rd District ===
General election results
Party	Candidate	Votes	%
Democratic	Tawna Sanchez	39,274	98.80%
Write-in		479	1.20%
Total votes		39,753	100.00%

=== 44th District ===
General election results
Party	Candidate	Votes	%
Democratic	Tina Kotek	32,465	87.19%
Republican	Margo Logan	4,643	12.47%
Write-in		127	0.34%
Total votes		37,235	100.00%

=== 45th District ===
General election results
Party	Candidate	Votes	%
Democratic	Barbara Smith Warner	31,326	97.26%
Write-in		883	2.74%
Total votes		32,209	100.00%

=== 46th District ===
General election results
Party	Candidate	Votes	%
Democratic	Khanh Pham	30,155	97.63%
Write-in		731	2.37%
Total votes		30,886	100.00%

=== 47th District ===
General election results
Party	Candidate	Votes	%
Democratic	Diego Hernandez	13,631	49.32%
Republican	Ryan Gardner	8,677	31.40%
Working Families	Ashton Simpson	5,264	19.05%
Write-in		64	0.23%
Total votes		27,636	100.00%

=== 48th District ===
General election results
Party	Candidate	Votes	%
Democratic	Jeff Reardon	21,328	75.68%
Libertarian	Edward Marihart	6,291	22.32%
Write-in		564	2.00%
Total votes		28,183	100.00%

=== 49th District ===
General election results
Party	Candidate	Votes	%
Democratic	Zach Hudson	16,091	57.26%
Republican	Joe Demers	11,912	42.39%
Write-in		97	0.35%
Total votes		28,100	100.00%

=== 50th District ===
General election results
Party	Candidate	Votes	%
Democratic	Ricki Ruiz	15,662	53.59%
Republican	Amelia Salvador	13,526	46.29%
Write-in		35	0.12%
Total votes		29,223	100.00%

=== 51st District ===
General election results
Party	Candidate	Votes	%
Democratic	Janelle Bynum	18,939	52.83%
Republican	Jane Hays	15,466	43.15%
Libertarian	Donald B Crawford	1,393	3.89%
Write-in		48	0.13%
Total votes		35,846	100.00%

=== 52nd District ===
General election results
Party	Candidate	Votes	%
Democratic	Anna Williams	19,209	48.73%
Republican	Jeffrey Helfrich	19,125	48.52%
Libertarian	Stephen D Aldor	1,060	2.69%
Write-in		26	0.07%
Total votes		39,420	100.00%

=== 53rd District ===
General election results
Party	Candidate	Votes	%
Republican	Jack Zika	27,442	57.07%
Democratic	Emerson Levy	20,569	42.78%
Write-in		72	0.15%
Total votes		48,083	100.00%

=== 54th District ===
General election results
Party	Candidate	Votes	%
Democratic	Jason Kropf	27,999	60.04%
Republican	Cheri Helt	18,153	38.93%
Write-in		480	1.03%
Total votes		46,632	100.00%
Democratic gain from Republican			

=== 55th District ===
General election results
Party	Candidate	Votes	%
Republican	Vikki Breese-Iverson	31,572	73.54%
Democratic	Barbara Fontaine	11,300	26.32%
Write-in		62	0.14%
Total votes		42,934	100.00%

=== 56th District ===
General election results
Party	Candidate	Votes	%
Republican	E. Werner Reschke	23,604	72.59%
Democratic	Faith Leith	8,859	27.24%
Write-in		55	0.17%
Total votes		32,518	100.00%

=== 57th District ===
General election results
Party	Candidate	Votes	%
Republican	Greg Smith	19,487	76.56%
Democratic	Roland Ruhe	5,917	23.25%
Write-in		48	0.19%
Total votes		25,452	100.00%

=== 58th District ===
General election results
Party	Candidate	Votes	%
Republican	Bobby Levy	24,846	72.79%
Democratic	Nolan Bylenga	9,230	27.04%
Write-in		57	0.17%
Total votes		34,133	100.00%

=== 59th District ===
General election results
Party	Candidate	Votes	%
Republican	Daniel Bonham	23,560	59.84%
Democratic	Arlene Burns	15,759	40.03%
Write-in		52	0.13%
Total votes		39,371	100.00%

=== 60th District ===
General election results
Party	Candidate	Votes	%
Republican	Mark Owens	23,252	77.44%
Democratic	Beth E Spell	6,724	22.39%
Write-in		51	0.17%
Total votes		30,027	100.00%

== See also ==
- 2020 Oregon State Senate election
