= Mari Watanabe =

American politician (born 1958 or 1959)

Member of the Oregon House of Representatives from the 34th district
- Incumbent
- Assumed office January 16, 2025
- Preceded by: Lisa Reynolds

Personal details
- Born: 1958 or 1959 (66 years old)
- Party: Democratic

Mari Watanabe is an American Democratic politician currently serving in the Oregon House of Representatives. She represents the 34th district, which contains portions of Multnomah and Washington counties and includes the communities of Bethany, Bonny Slope, Cedar Mill, Oak Hills, Rockcreek, and Tanasbourne as well as parts of northern Beaverton and northwestern Portland.

Watanabe was selected by Multnomah and Washington County Commissioners at a joint meeting on January 16, 2025 to fill the vacant seat, beating out candidates Sarah Beachy and Alexandria Goddard. The vacancy was created by Lisa Reynolds's move to the Oregon Senate to fill the vacancy created by Elizabeth Steiner's election as Oregon State Treasurer.

She is the first Japanese American to ever serve in either branch of the Oregon Legislature.

== Biography ==
Watanabe was the first executive director of the Japanese Museum of Oregon. She has also worked for the Portland Business Alliance and Partners in Diversity and has served on the boards of directors for Portland Community College and the Oregon Commission on Asian and Pacific Islander Affairs. She has lived in the Bethany area for nearly two decades.
