= Oregon's 16th Senate district =

American legislative district

Oregon's 16th Senate District as of September 27, 2021

District 16 of the Oregon State Senate comprises all of Clatsop, Columbia, and Tillamook counties as well as western portions of Multnomah and Washington counties and a small sliver of northern Yamhill County. It consists of Oregon House districts 31 and 32. It is currently represented by Republican Suzanne Weber.

== Election results ==
District boundaries have changed over time. Therefore, senators before 2013 may not represent the same constituency as today. From 1993 until 2003, the district covered parts of the Salem metropolitan area; from 2003 until 2013, it shifted to cover northwest Oregon, including all of Clatsop, Columbia, and Tillamook counties, western Washington County, and northwestern Multnomah County; and from 2013 until 2023, it lost the southern half of Tillamook County while gaining parts of Bethany.

The current district is very similar to the previous iteration, losing parts of northwest Portland south of Sauvie Island and all of Bethany while gaining North Plains and a small sliver of Yamhill County near Gaston and regaining all of Tillamook County.

The results are as follows:

Year	Candidate	Party	Percent	Opponent	Party	Percent	Opponent	Party	Percent	Opponent	Party	Percent
1982	L. B. Day	Republican	51.9%	Jack Sumner	Democratic	48.1%	No third candidate			No fourth candidate		
1986	Jim Hill	Democratic	73.6%	Frank Day	Republican	26.4%	No third candidate			No fourth candidate		
1990	Jim Hill	Democratic	61.6%	Terry Kay	Republican	38.4%	No third candidate			No fourth candidate		
1994	Gene Derfler	Republican	68.0%	Mike Montgomery	Democratic	32.0%	No third candidate			No fourth candidate		
1998	Gene Derfler	Republican	58.5%	Lloyd Kumley	Democratic	39.0%	Della Smith	Socialist	2.1%	No fourth candidate		
2002	Joan Dukes	Democratic	56.4%	Don Fell	Republican	38.3%	Helen McDaniel	Libertarian	5.3%	No fourth candidate		
2006	Betsy Johnson	Democratic	63.6%	Don Fell	Republican	33.3%	Robert J. Simmering	Constitution	3.0%	No fourth candidate		
2010	Betsy Johnson	Democratic	54.4%	Bob Horning	Republican	45.3%	No third candidate			No fourth candidate		
2014	Betsy Johnson	Democratic	70.0%	Andrew Kaza	Independent	13.5%	Bob Ekstrom	Constitution	12.2%	Perry Roll	Libertarian	3.9%
2018	Betsy Johnson	Democratic	82.0%	Ray Biggs	Constitution	17.3%	No third candidate			No fourth candidate		
2022	Suzanne Weber	Republican	56.5	Melissa Busch	Democratic	43.4	No third candidate			No fourth candidate		
2026	Courtney Bangs	Republican										
