= 2024 Oregon State Treasurer election =

- November 5, 2024
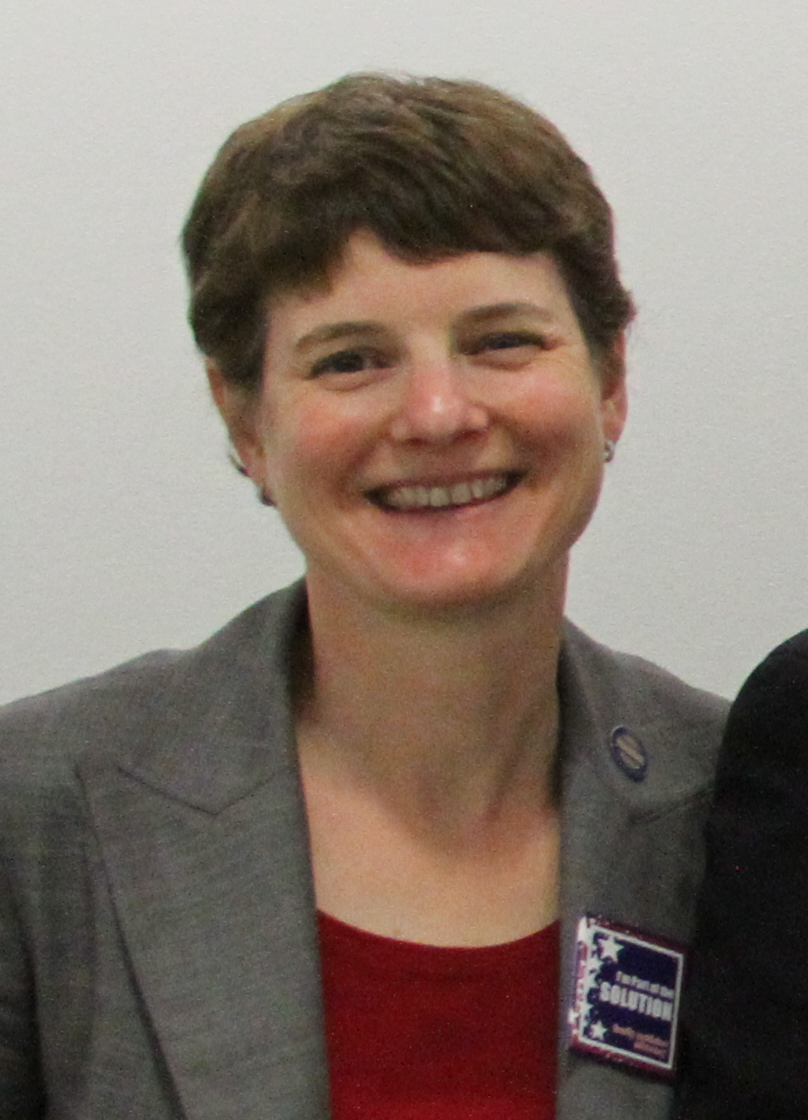

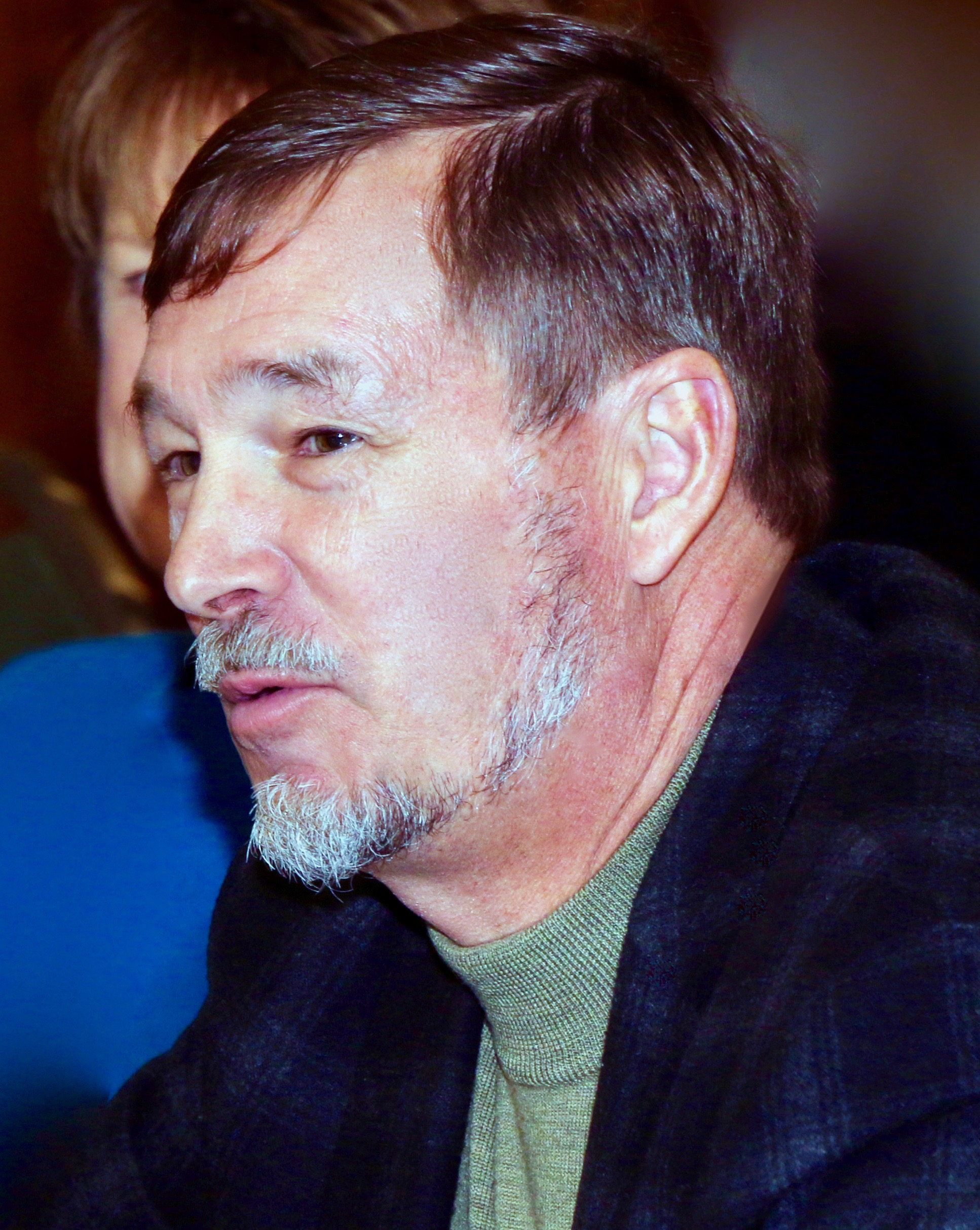

Candidate	Elizabeth Steiner	Brian Boquist	Mary King
Party	Democratic	Republican	Working Families
Popular vote	1,050,119	919,794	155,473
Percentage	49.36%	43.24%	7.31%
- Steiner: 40–50% 50–60% 60–70% 70–80% 80–90% >90% Boquist: 40–50% 50–60% 60–70% 70–80% 80–90% >90% Tie: 40–50% No votes
State Treasurer before election
Tobias Read
Democratic
Elected State Treasurer
Elizabeth Steiner
Democratic

The 2024 Oregon State Treasurer election was held on November 5, 2024, to elect the Oregon state treasurer. Incumbent Democratic state treasurer Tobias Read was term-limited and could not seek re-election to a third term in office; he instead successfully ran for Secretary of State.

Primary elections took place May 21, 2024. On November 5, 2024, Democratic state senator Elizabeth Steiner defeated Republican state senator Brian Boquist in the general election, becoming the first woman to serve as state treasurer.

== Democratic primary ==
=== Candidates ===
==== Nominee ====
- Elizabeth Steiner, state senator from the 17th district (2011–present)

==== Eliminated in primary ====
- Jeff Gudman, former Lake Oswego city councilor (2013–2020) and Republican nominee for state treasurer in 2016 and 2020

==== Declined ====
- Jeff Golden, state senator from the 3rd district (2018–present)

=== Endorsements ===
Jeff Gudman

Newspapers

- The Oregonian
Elizabeth Steiner

Organizations

- Basic Rights Oregon

Labor unions

- Oregon Education Association

Newspapers

- Eugene Weekly
- Portland Mercury
- The Skanner
- Willamette Week

==== Debate ====
2024 Oregon State Treasurer election Democratic primary debate
No.	Date	Host	Moderator	Link	Democratic	Democratic
Key: P Participant A Absent N Not invited I Invited W Withdrawn						
Key: P Participant A Absent N Not invited I Invited W Withdrawn					Jeff Gudman	Elizabeth Steiner
1	Apr. 12, 2024	City Club of Portland	Suzanne Stevens	YouTube	P	P

=== Results ===
Results by county Steiner: 60–70%; 70–80%; 80–90%

Democratic primary results
Party	Candidate	Votes	%
Democratic	Elizabeth Steiner	335,079	78.48%
Democratic	Jeff Gudman	89,459	20.95%
Democratic	Miscellaneous	2,418	0.57%
Total votes		426,956	100.00%

== Republican primary ==
=== Candidates ===
==== Nominee ====
- Brian Boquist, state senator from the 12th district (2009–present)

==== Withdrawn ====
- Nathan Sandvig, renewable energy developer

=== Results ===
Republican primary results
Party	Candidate	Votes	%
Republican	Brian Boquist	251,064	98.85%
Republican	Miscellaneous	2,914	1.15%
Total votes		253,978	100.00%

== General election ==
=== Endorsements ===
Elizabeth Steiner (D)

Newspapers

- The Oregonian
- Willamette Week

=== Polling ===
Poll source	Date(s) administered	Sample size (Note: Key: A – all adults RV – registered voters LV – likely voters V – unclear)	Margin of error	Elizabeth Steiner Democratic	Brian Boquist Republican	Mary King Working Families	Undecided
Public Policy Polling (D) (Note: This poll was sponsored by the Northwest Progressive Institute)	October 16–17, 2024	716 (LV)	± 3.7%	42%	37%	4%	16%

=== Results ===
King's results by county: King—8.75–10.0% King—7.50–8.75% King—6.25–7.50% King—5.00–6.25% King—3.75–5.00%

Steiner won a plurality of the votes, securing nine out of Oregon's 36 counties She performed the best in the state's most populous Multnomah County, home to Oregon's largest city, Portland, with 71.6% of the vote. The county was also where King, a third-party challenger, did the best, with 9.6% of the vote. Conversely, Boquist performed best in the rural Lake County, earning 81.7% of the vote. Steiner became the first woman to be elected as Oregon's state treasurer.

2024 Oregon State Treasurer election
Party	Candidate	Votes	%	±%
Democratic	Elizabeth Steiner	1,050,119	49.36%	–2.32%
Republican	Brian Boquist	919,794	43.24%	+1.74%
Working Families	Mary King	155,473	7.31%	N/A
Write-in		1,882	0.09%	–
Total votes		2,127,268	100.00%	N/A
Democratic hold				

==== By county ====
County	Elizabeth Steiner Democratic		Brian Boquist Republican		Various candidates Other parties		Margin		Total
County	#	%	#	%	#	%	#	%	Total
Baker	1,932	20.73%	6,923	74.28%	465	4.99%	-4,991	-53.55%	9,320
Benton	28,673	59.36%	15,411	31.90%	4,222	8.74%	13,262	27.45%	48,306
Clackamas	108,706	47.13%	107,329	46.53%	14,609	6.33%	1,377	0.60%	230,644
Clatsop	10,524	47.60%	9,770	44.19%	1,816	8.21%	754	3.41%	22,110
Columbia	10,851	36.41%	16,714	56.08%	2,240	7.52%	-5,863	-19.67%	29,805
Coos	11,809	34.74%	20,184	59.38%	2,000	5.88%	-8,375	-24.64%	33,993
Crook	3,201	20.59%	11,641	74.88%	704	4.53%	-8,440	-54.29%	15,546
Curry	5,106	37.80%	7,754	57.40%	649	4.80%	-2,648	-19.60%	13,509
Deschutes	57,617	47.47%	56,236	46.33%	7,526	6.20%	1,381	1.14%	121,379
Douglas	15,595	26.40%	40,353	68.32%	3,114	5.27%	-24,758	-41.92%	59,062
Gilliam	228	21.31%	787	73.55%	55	5.14%	-559	-52.24%	1,070
Grant	692	16.51%	3,317	79.13%	183	4.37%	-2,625	-62.62%	4,192
Harney	698	17.49%	3,122	78.23%	171	4.28%	-2,424	-60.74%	3,991
Hood River	6,950	58.59%	4,009	33.79%	904	7.62%	2,941	24.79%	11,863
Jackson	46,216	40.62%	60,682	53.33%	6,883	6.05%	-14,466	-12.71%	113,781
Jefferson	3,256	28.97%	7,272	64.69%	713	6.34%	-4,016	-35.73%	11,241
Josephine	14,257	30.51%	29,954	64.09%	2,524	5.40%	-15,697	-33.59%	46,735
Klamath	8,080	23.99%	23,702	70.36%	1,903	5.65%	-15,622	-46.38%	33,685
Lake	580	14.32%	3,307	81.65%	163	4.02%	-2,727	-67.33%	4,050
Lane	107,514	53.76%	76,981	38.49%	15,497	7.75%	30,533	15.27%	199,992
Lincoln	14,903	52.10%	11,600	40.55%	2,103	7.35%	3,303	11.55%	28,606
Linn	21,555	31.97%	41,598	61.70%	4,264	6.32%	-20,043	-29.73%	67,417
Malheur	2,286	21.69%	7,595	72.07%	657	6.23%	-5,309	-50.38%	10,538
Marion	61,499	41.19%	76,724	51.39%	11,074	7.42%	-15,225	-10.20%	149,297
Morrow	936	20.83%	3,284	73.09%	273	6.08%	-2,348	-52.26%	4,493
Multnomah	280,952	71.60%	73,258	18.67%	38,180	9.73%	207,694	52.93%	392,390
Polk	18,461	40.41%	24,119	52.79%	3,107	6.80%	-5,658	-12.38%	45,687
Sherman	188	16.95%	873	78.72%	48	4.33%	-685	-61.77%	1,109
Tillamook	6,609	42.67%	7,960	51.39%	920	5.94%	-1,351	-8.72%	15,489
Umatilla	7,444	25.23%	20,194	68.44%	1,867	6.33%	-12,750	-43.21%	29,505
Union	3,356	24.13%	9,793	70.41%	759	5.46%	-6,437	-46.28%	13,908
Wallowa	1,285	26.40%	3,320	68.21%	262	5.38%	-2,035	-41.81%	4,867
Wasco	5,113	40.56%	6,673	52.94%	819	6.50%	-1,560	-12.38%	12,605
Washington	161,100	57.33%	97,104	34.56%	22,795	8.11%	63,996	22.77%	280,999
Wheeler	174	21.09%	610	73.94%	41	4.97%	-436	-52.85%	825
Yamhill	21,773	39.40%	29,641	53.64%	3,845	6.96%	-7,868	-14.24%	55,259
Totals	1,050,119	49.36%	919,794	43.24%	157,355	7.40%	130,325	6.13%	2,127,268

Counties that flipped from Republican to Democratic

- Deschutes (largest city: Bend)

==== By congressional district ====
Steiner won five of six congressional districts.

District	Steiner	Boquist	Representative
1st	59%	32%	Suzanne Bonamici
2nd	31%	63%	Cliff Bentz
3rd	64%	27%	Earl Blumenauer (118th Congress)
3rd	64%	27%	Maxine Dexter (119th Congress)
4th	49%	44%	Val Hoyle
5th	46.72%	46.75%	Lori Chavez-DeRemer (118th Congress)
5th	46.72%	46.75%	Janelle Bynum (119th Congress)
6th	47%	45%	Andrea Salinas

== See also ==
- 2024 Oregon elections

== Notes ==
Partisan clients
