= Oregon's 34th House district =

Legislative districts in the state of Oregon

Oregon's 34th House district after redistricting after the 2020 Census

District 34 of the Oregon House of Representatives is one of 60 House legislative districts in the state of Oregon. As of 2021, the boundary for the district contains portions of Multnomah and Washington counties. The district includes Bethany, Bonny Slope, Cedar Mill, Oak Hills, Rockcreek, and Tanasbourne as well as northern Beaverton and a small part of northwestern Portland. The current representative for the district is Democrat Mari Watanabe of Bethany.

== Election results ==
District boundaries have changed over time. Therefore, representatives before 2021 may not represent the same constituency as today. General election results from 2000 to present are as follows:

Year	Candidate	Party	Percent	Opponent	Party	Percent	Opponent	Party	Percent	Opponent	Party	Percent	Write-in percentage
2000	Lane Shetterly	Republican	61.09%	Marilyn Slizeski	Democratic	31.46%	Steve Walker	Constitution	5.45%	J. T. Barrie	Libertarian	2.01%	
2002	Brad Avakian	Democratic	53.11%	John Scruggs	Republican	42.80%	Kevin Schaumleffle	Libertarian	4.09%	No fourth candidate			
2004	Brad Avakian	Democratic	96.50%	Unopposed									3.50%
2006	Suzanne Bonamici	Democratic	61.51%	Joan Draper	Republican	36.05%	Gregory Rohde	Libertarian	2.30%	No fourth candidate			0.14%
2008 (Note: Chris Harker was the incumbent in this election. He was appointed to this seat on June 18, 2008 to replace Suzanne Bonamici, who resigned to take an appointment to the District 17 seat in the Oregon Senate.)	Chris Harker	Democratic	70.75%	Piotr Kuklinski	Republican	28.82%	No third candidate			No fourth candidate			0.43%
2010	Chris Harker	Democratic	59.09%	Tyler Hill	Republican	38.34%	James Foster	Libertarian	2.41%	No fourth candidate			0.17%
2012	Chris Harker	Democratic	63.80%	Dan Mason	Republican	35.90%	No third candidate			No fourth candidate			0.30%
2014	Ken Helm	Democratic	66.09%	Brenden King	Republican	33.38%	No third candidate			No fourth candidate			0.53%
2016	Ken Helm	Democratic	65.13%	Donald Hershiser	Independent	34.57%	No third candidate			No fourth candidate			0.30%
2018	Ken Helm	Democratic	69.24%	Michael Ngo	Republican	25.04%	Joshua Ryan Johnston	Libertarian	5.54%	No fourth candidate			0.17%
2020	Ken Helm	Democratic	96.74%	Unopposed									3.26%
2022	Lisa Reynolds	Democratic	68.67%	John Woods	Republican	31.23%	No third candidate			No fourth candidate			0.11%
2024	Lisa Reynolds	Democratic	71.5%	John Verbeek	Republican	28.4%	No third candidate			No fourth candidate			0.1%

== See also ==
- Oregon Legislative Assembly
- Oregon House of Representatives
