= Tiffany Mitchell =

Tiffany Mitchell may refer to:

- Tiffany Mitchell (basketball) (born 1994), American basketball player
- Tiffany Mitchell (EastEnders), fictional character

== See also ==
- Tiffiny Mitchell, American politician from Oregon
- Tiffany Mitchell, sixth-place contestant on Big Brother 23 (American season)
