= Lisa Reynolds =

American politician

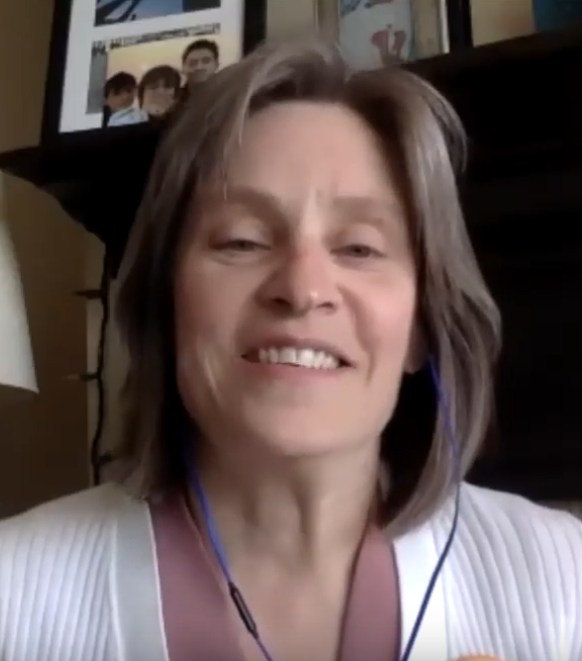

Member of the Oregon Senate from the 17th district
- Incumbent
- Assumed office December 9, 2024
- Preceded by: Elizabeth Steiner

Member of the Oregon House of Representatives from the 34th district
- In office January 9, 2023 – December 9, 2024
- Preceded by: Ken Helm
- Succeeded by: Mari Watanabe

Member of the Oregon House of Representatives from the 36th district
- In office January 11, 2021 – January 9, 2023
- Preceded by: Akasha Lawrence-Spence
- Succeeded by: Hai Pham

Personal details
- Party: Democratic
- Children: Hank Sanders
- Education: University of Chicago (BS) University of California, Los Angeles (MD)
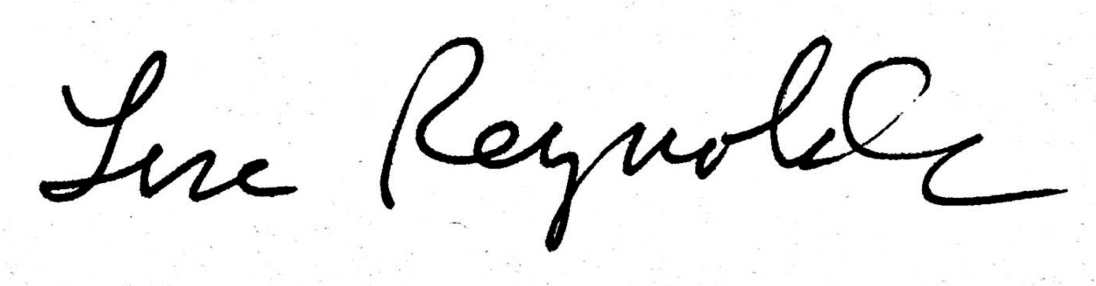
- Signature

Lisa Reynolds is an American pediatrician and politician who has represented the 17th district in the Oregon State Senate since December 2024. A member of the Democratic Party, she previously served in the Oregon House of Representatives from 2021 to 2024. She chairs the Senate Committee on Early Childhood and Behavioral Health.

== Early life and education ==
Reynolds was born and raised in suburban Chicago in a working class family.

Reynolds earned an undergraduate degree from the University of Chicago and a medical degree from the UCLA School of Medicine.

== Career ==
Reynolds was chief resident in pediatrics at Legacy Emanuel Children's Hospital from 1994-95. As of 2025, she is still a pediatrician in Washington County. She is also the co-founder of a political organization, Indivisible Oregon.

=== Oregon House of Representatives ===
In December 2019, State Representative Jennifer Williamson resigned to run for Oregon Secretary of State. The Multnomah County Commission selected Portland Planning & Sustainability Commission member Akasha Lawrence-Spence to replace her in a placeholder capacity, until the next election. Lisa Reynolds announced her candidacy for the seat and defeated three other candidates in a competitive primary. She went on to defeat Republican small business owner James A. Ball in the general election.

For the 2021 session, Reynolds was appointed vice-chair of the Early Childhood Committee, and also served on the Behavioral Health and Water Committees.

For the 2023 session, she was appointed Chair of the Early Childhood Committee, and also served on the Judiciary Committee.

=== Oregon State Senate ===
After Elizabeth Steiner resigned from the Senate following her election as Oregon State Treasurer, Reynolds was appointed to the seat by the county commissioners of Multnomah and Washington counties. Reynolds, having won re-election to the house just two weeks prior, was replaced in the house by Mari Watanabe.

For the 2025 session, Reynolds was appointed chair of the Early Childhood and Behavioral Health Committee, and was also appointed to the Human Services and Health Care Committees.

In 2025, Reynolds sponsored Senate Bill 28, which would have required commercial insurers to reimburse independent primary care practices at rates comparable to those paid to hospital-based providers. Reynolds is the owner of a pediatric practice, and Willamette Week reported that the bill could benefit her financially. She said she had not sought ethics guidance before introducing it. She later asked the Oregon Government Ethics Commission for advice, which referred the question to the Office of the Legislative Counsel. In a May 2025 opinion, the Legislative Counsel concluded that she belongs to an exempted class and had no conflict of interest to declare. The bill advanced from the Health Care Committee but remained in Ways and Means when session adjourned.

In 2025, Reynolds was a chief sponsor of Senate Bill 692, which requires the Oregon Health Plan and commercial insurers to cover at least 24 hours of doula and lactation support services without referral or prior authorization and creates a grant program for training these workers. She also supported Senate Bill 690, which bars eviction for nonpayment of rent for families with an infant 12 months or younger who have been approved for rental assistance but have not yet received it.

In 2026, Reynolds carried Senate Bill 1546 on the Senate floor, which requires operators of AI companion chatbots to develop and use safe responses, such as referral to the 988 crisis line, for users who express suicidal ideation or self-harm.

In 2026, Senate Bill 1573, sponsored by Republican Christine Drazan would have prohibited syringe service programs from operating within 2,000 feet of a school or licensed childcare facility. The bill received a hearing in the Senate Committee on Early Childhood and Behavioral Health, which Reynolds chairs, and did not advance. Neighborhood residents who had supported the bill criticized Reynolds, for whom they held responsible. In May 2026, Reynolds said she supported a Multnomah County ordinance prohibiting needle distribution in "safe school zones," and said she planned to introduce statewide legislation in 2027.

== Personal life ==
In 2026, her son, Hank Sanders, was elected to the Oregon House.

== Electoral history ==
2024 Oregon State Representative, 34th district
Party	Candidate	Votes	%
Democratic	Lisa Reynolds	22,572	71.5
Republican	John Verbeek	8,973	28.4
Write-in		44	0.1
Total votes		31,589	100%

2022 Oregon State Representative, 34th district
Party	Candidate	Votes	%
Democratic	Lisa Reynolds	19,354	68.7
Republican	John Woods	8,801	31.2
Write-in		30	0.1
Total votes		28,185	100%

2020 Oregon State Representative, 36th district
Party	Candidate	Votes	%
Democratic	Lisa Reynolds	34,577	83.1
Republican	James A Ball	6,986	16.8
Write-in		66	0.2
Total votes		41,629	100%

2020 Oregon State Representative, 36th district Democratic primary
Party	Candidate	Votes	%
Democratic	Lisa Reynolds	7,476	43.3%
Democratic	Laurie Wimmer	6,177	35.8%
Democratic	Rob Fullmer	2,288	13.2%
Democratic	Adam Meyer	1,301	7.5%
Total votes		17,242	100.00%
