= Akasha Lawrence-Spence =

American politician

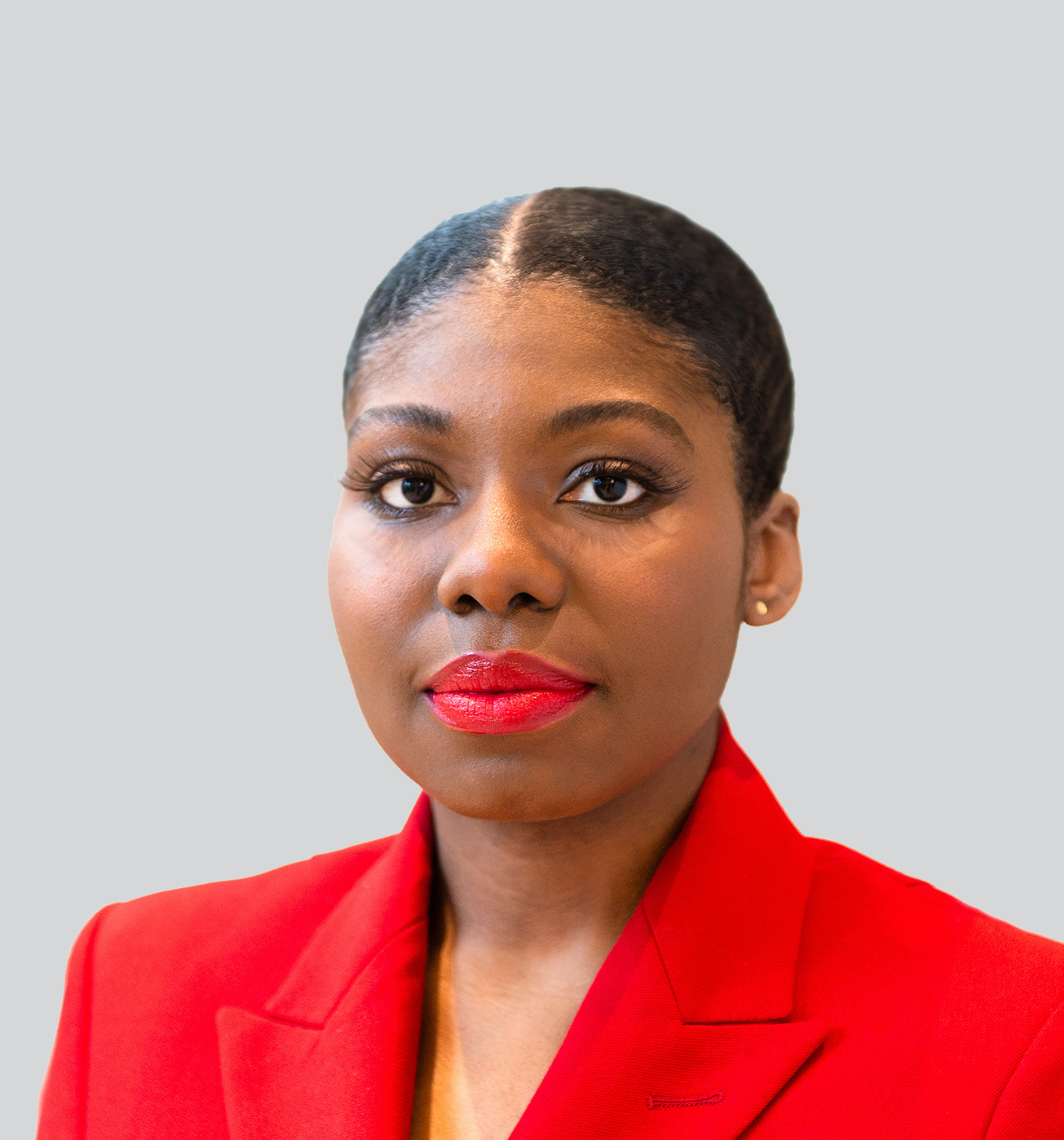

Member of the Oregon Senate from the 18th district
- In office February 1, 2022 – January 9, 2023
- Preceded by: Ginny Burdick
- Succeeded by: Wlnsvey Campos

Member of the Oregon House of Representatives from the 36th district
- In office January 17, 2020 – January 11, 2021
- Preceded by: Jennifer Williamson
- Succeeded by: Lisa Reynolds

Personal details
- Party: Democratic

Akasha Lawrence-Spence is an American politician and a former Democratic member of the Oregon State Senate. She previously represented the 36th district in the Oregon House of Representatives; appointed on January 17, 2020, to replace Jennifer Williamson who resigned to run for Secretary of State. Lawrence-Spence was appointed by the Multnomah County Commission which by law appoints members of the same party to replace resigning legislators. She did not run for re-election. She has previously served as a member of the Portland Planning and Sustainability Commission.

In November 2021, Lawrence-Spence was appointed to the Oregon Senate to fill the vacancy caused by Ginny Burdick's resignation.
