= Courtney Bangs =

American politician

Member-elect of the Oregon Senate from the 16th district
- Assuming office January 11, 2027
- Succeeding: Suzanne Weber

Personal details
- Party: Republican
- Education: Oregon State University
- Website: www.courtneybangs.com

Courtney Bangs is an American politician who was elected to the Oregon State Senate representing Oregon's 16th Senate district, which covers all of Clatsop, Columbia, and Tillamook counties and parts of Washington, Multnomah, and Yamhill counties. She was elected at the 2026 Oregon State Senate election. She was appointed Chair of the Clatsop County Board of Commissioners in January 2023.
