= Ken Helm =

American politician from Oregon

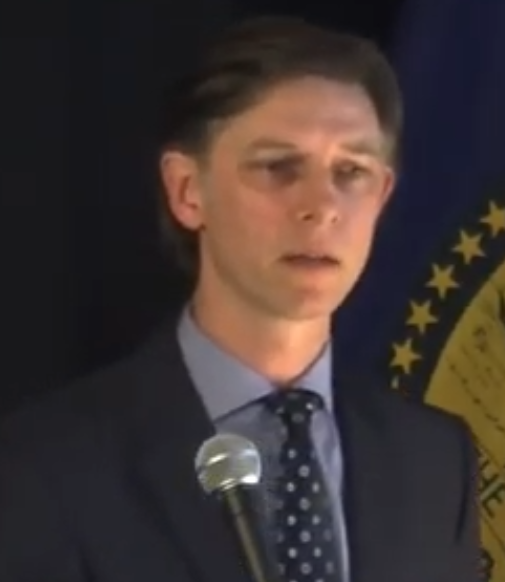

Member of the Oregon House of Representatives from the 27th district
- Incumbent
- Assumed office January 11, 2021
- Preceded by: Sheri Schouten

Member of the Oregon House of Representatives from the 34th district
- In office January 12, 2015 – January 11, 2021
- Preceded by: Chris Harker
- Succeeded by: Lisa Reynolds

Personal details
- Born: 1964 or 1965 (age 61–62)
- Party: Democratic
- Education: Willamette University (BA, JD)
- Profession: lawyer, politician
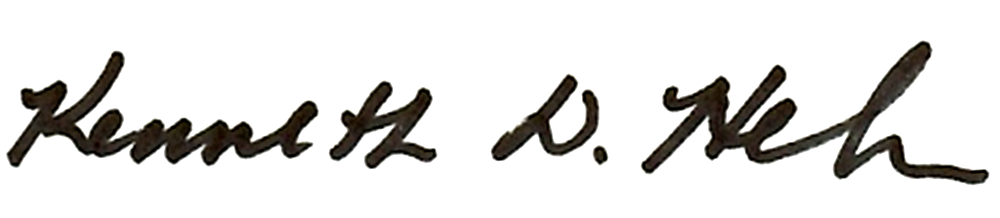
- Signature

Ken Helm is an American lawyer and politician from Oregon. A Democrat, he serves in the Oregon House of Representatives, representing House District 27 in Beaverton and Cedar Hills. Helm was first elected in 2014, winning the Democratic primary on May 20, 2014, and facing no Republican opposition in the general election.

Helm lives in Beaverton.

== Personal life ==
Helm grew up in Bend and lived briefly in Chicago as an adult. He earned a bachelor's degree in history and a juris doctor, both from Willamette University.

He is a land use lawyer by training, starting his career as a clerk for the Oregon Land Use Board of Appeals. Helm is a member of Kappa Sigma fraternity.

== Electoral history ==
2014 Oregon State Representative, 34th district
Party	Candidate	Votes	%
Democratic	Ken Helm	13,475	66.1
Republican	Brenden King	6,807	33.4
Write-in		108	0.5
Total votes		20,390	100%

2016 Oregon State Representative, 34th district
Party	Candidate	Votes	%
Democratic	Ken Helm	18,606	65.1
Independent	Donald E Hershiser	9,875	34.6
Write-in		86	0.3
Total votes		28,567	100%

2018 Oregon State Representative, 34th district
Party	Candidate	Votes	%
Democratic	Ken Helm	19,470	69.2
Republican	Michael Ngo	7,041	25.0
Libertarian	Joshua Ryan Johnston	1,558	5.5
Write-in		49	0.2
Total votes		28,118	100%

2020 Oregon State Representative, 34th district
Party	Candidate	Votes	%
Democratic	Ken Helm	26,867	96.7
Write-in		904	3.3
Total votes		27,771	100%

2022 Oregon State Representative, 27th district
Party	Candidate	Votes	%
Democratic	Ken Helm	22,375	71.2
Republican	Sandra Nelson	9,007	28.7
Write-in		37	0.1
Total votes		31,419	100%

2024 Oregon State Representative, 27th district
Party	Candidate	Votes	%
Democratic	Ken Helm	25,142	74.0
Republican	Victoria Kingsbury	8,780	25.9
Write-in		35	0.1
Total votes		33,957	100%
