= Deborah Boone =

American politician

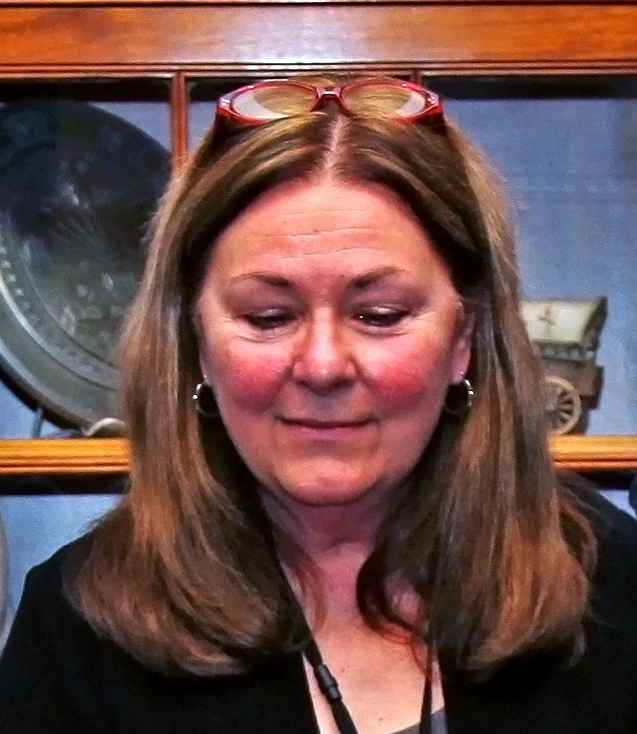
- Boone in 2013

Member of the Oregon House of Representatives from the 32nd district
- In office 2004–2019
- Preceded by: Elaine Hopson
- Succeeded by: Tiffiny Mitchell

Personal details
- Born: 1951 (age 74–75) Portland, Oregon, U.S.
- Party: Democratic
- Education: Portland State University

Deborah Boone (born 1951) is an American politician from the state of Oregon. She served as a Democratic member of the Oregon House of Representatives, where she represented District 32. Her time in office began with her appointment on August 4, 2004, to serve out the remaining term of Representative Elaine Hopson. Boone won election in 2004 and was re-elected in 2006, 2008, 2010, 2012, 2014, and 2016. She was succeeded by Representative Tiffiny Mitchell, who was elected in 2018 and took office in 2019.

== District 32 ==
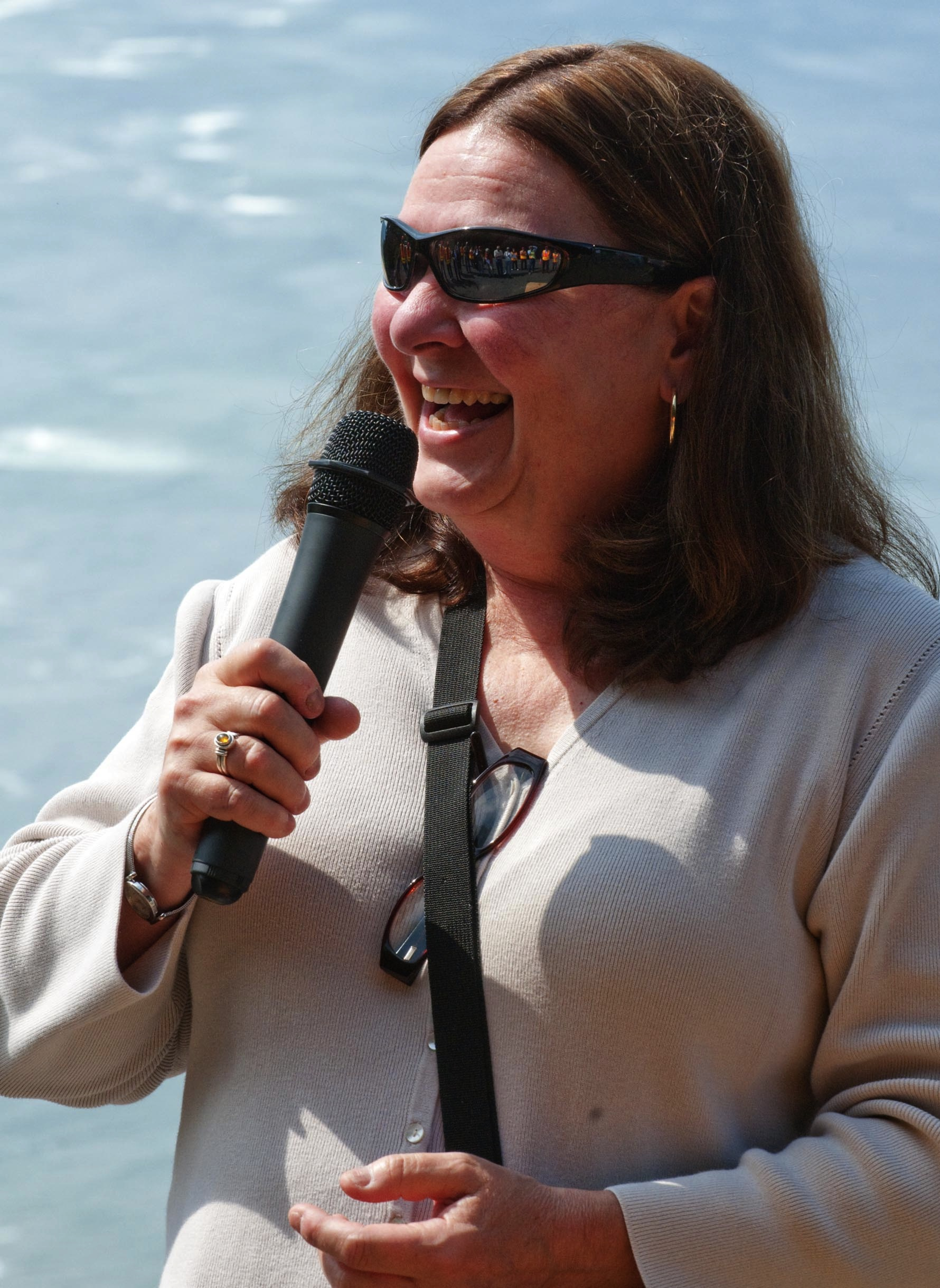
Boone in 2009

Oregon's 32nd House District includes parts of Clatsop, Tillamook, and Washington counties in Northwest Oregon. The district office is in Cannon Beach.

== Electoral history ==
2004 Oregon State Representative, 32nd district
| Party | Candidate | Votes | % |
|---|---|---|---|
| Democratic | Deborah Boone | 15,426 | 49.9 |
| Republican | Douglas S. Olson | 14,478 | 46.8 |
| Constitution | Ben Snodgrass | 918 | 3.0 |
| Write-in | | 89 | 0.3 |
| Total votes | | 30,911 | 100% |

2006 Oregon State Representative, 32nd district
| Party | Candidate | Votes | % |
|---|---|---|---|
| Democratic | Deborah Boone | 14,876 | 61.9 |
| Republican | Norm Myers | 9,112 | 37.9 |
| Write-in | | 61 | 0.3 |
| Total votes | | 24,049 | 100% |

2008 Oregon State Representative, 32nd district
| Party | Candidate | Votes | % |
|---|---|---|---|
| Democratic | Deborah Boone | 18,602 | 66.8 |
| Republican | Tim Bero | 9,160 | 32.9 |
| Write-in | | 92 | 0.3 |
| Total votes | | 27,854 | 100% |

2010 Oregon State Representative, 32nd district
| Party | Candidate | Votes | % |
|---|---|---|---|
| Democratic | Deborah Boone | 12,977 | 52.2 |
| Republican | Lew Barnes | 11,832 | 47.6 |
| Write-in | | 45 | 0.2 |
| Total votes | | 24,854 | 100% |

2012 Oregon State Representative, 32nd district
| Party | Candidate | Votes | % |
|---|---|---|---|
| Democratic | Deborah Boone | 18,405 | 68.3 |
| Constitution | Jim Welsh | 6,938 | 25.8 |
| Libertarian | Perry Roll | 1,468 | 5.5 |
| Write-in | | 118 | 0.4 |
| Total votes | | 26,929 | 100% |

2014 Oregon State Representative, 32nd district
| Party | Candidate | Votes | % |
|---|---|---|---|
| Democratic | Deborah Boone | 14,831 | 60.2 |
| Republican | Rick Rose | 9,677 | 39.3 |
| Write-in | | 119 | 0.5 |
| Total votes | | 24,627 | 100% |

2016 Oregon State Representative, 32nd district
| Party | Candidate | Votes | % |
|---|---|---|---|
| Democratic | Deborah Boone | 18,540 | 56.5 |
| Republican | Bruce L Bobek | 14,157 | 43.2 |
| Write-in | | 97 | 0.3 |
| Total votes | | 32,794 | 100% |
