= Janet Carlson =

American politician

Member of the Oregon House of Representatives from the 32nd district
- In office 2001–2003
- Preceded by: Kevin Mannix
- Succeeded by: Elaine Hopson

Personal details
- Party: Republican
- Spouse: Dee Kevin Carlson
- Education: Willamette University Ph.D. University of Oregon

Janet Carlson was a member of the Oregon House of Representatives from 2001 to 2003. She served 16 years as a member of the Marion County Board of Commissioners. She was first elected to the Board in November 2002.

== Early life and career ==
Carlson earned a degree from Willamette University in 1975 and a M.A. in political science from BYU in 1977. After graduating, she was a high school teacher in Oregon. She earned a PhD from the University of Oregon in Special Education and Community Resources in 1997.

In 2000, Carlson ran for the Oregon House of Representatives to fill the seat left open by Kevin Mannix, who was running for State Attorney General. In the House, she served on the House Revenue and House Commerce committees. At the time of the election, she was the treasurer of the Marion County Republican Party.

After redistricting in 2002, Carlson ran successfully for the Marion County Board of Commissioners. She was reelected in 2006, 2010, and 2014. During her tenure, she served as president of the Association of Oregon Counties and as a member of the board of directors of the National Association of Counties.

Her colleagues on the Board of Commissioners described her as a "force of leadership" and her leadership style as "striving collaboratively for long-term, meaningful successes."

== Family ==
Carlson is married to her husband Dee. They have three children.
