= Hai Pham =

American politician

Member of the Oregon House of Representatives from the 36th district
- Incumbent
- Assumed office January 9, 2023
- Preceded by: Lisa Reynolds

Personal details
- Born: Tengah Island, Malaysia
- Party: Democratic
- Spouse: Natalie
- Children: 1
- Education: Oregon State University (BS); Oregon Health & Science University (DMD)
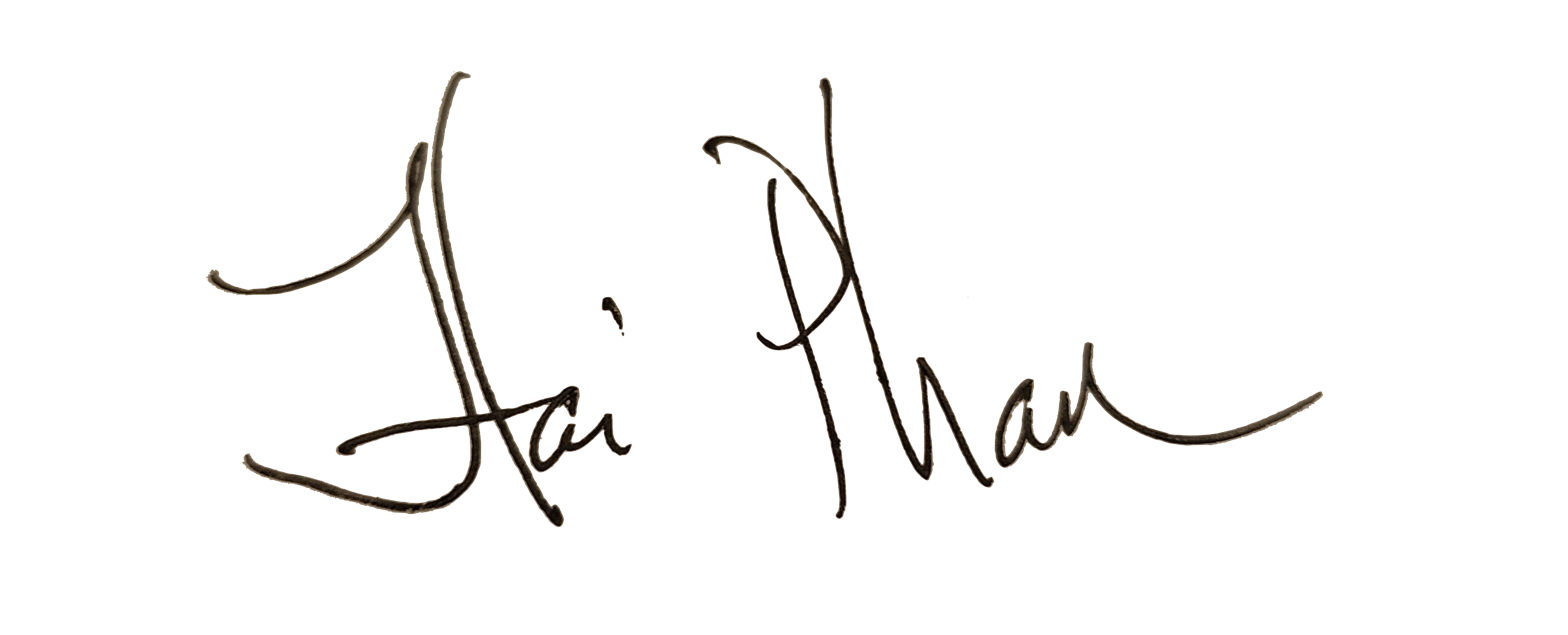
- Signature

Hai T. Pham is an American dentist and politician serving as a member of the Oregon House of Representatives for the 36th district. Elected in November 2022, he assumed office on January 9, 2023.

== Early life and education ==
Pham was born in Malaysia, the son of immigrants who fled Vietnam amid the Sino-Vietnamese War. He moved to Corvallis, Oregon, as a child. Pham earned a Bachelor of Science degree in biology from Oregon State University in 2002 and a Doctor of Medicine in Dentistry from the Oregon Health & Science University.

== Career ==
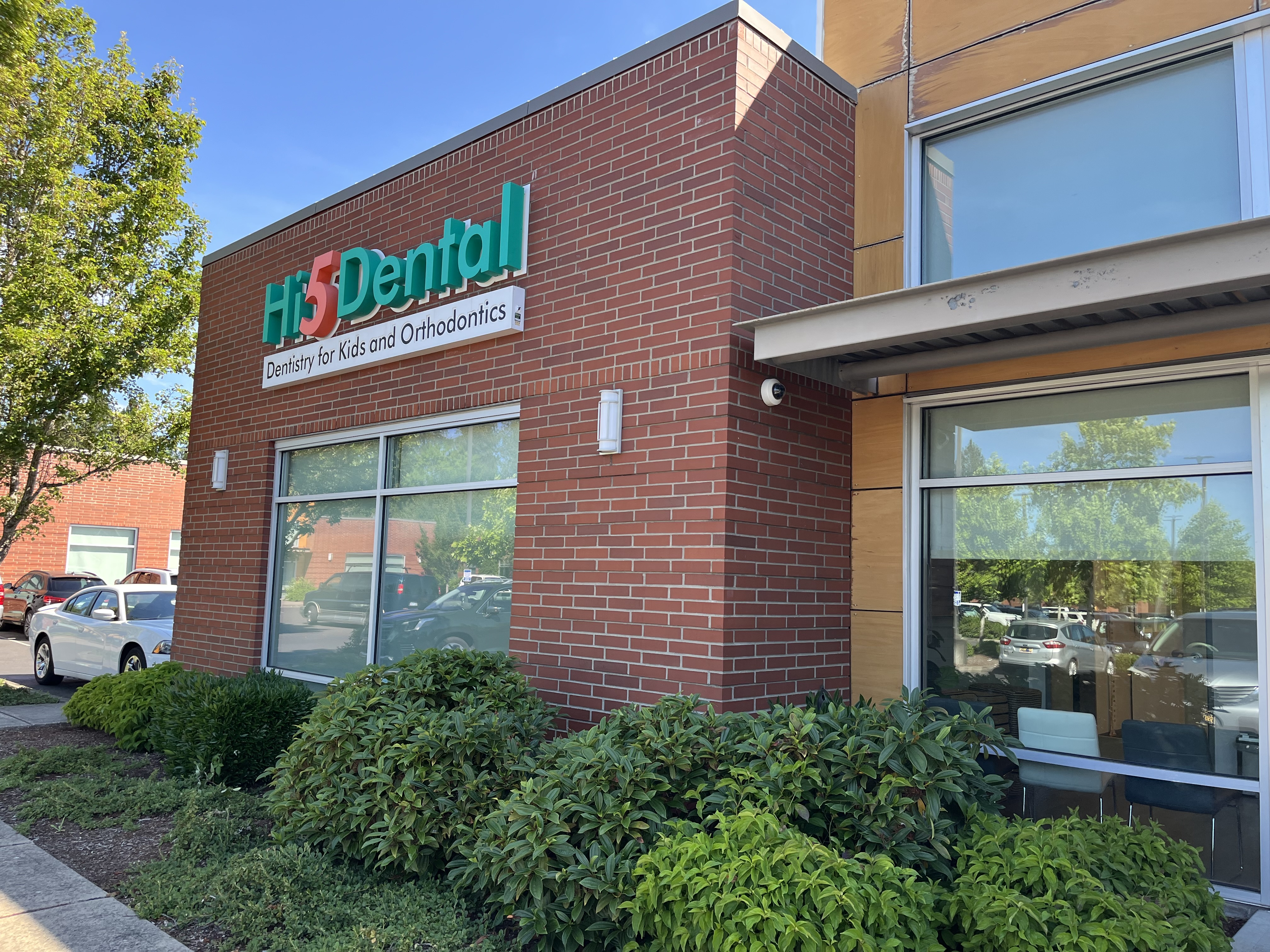
Hai Pham’s Dentistry business office

Outside of politics, Pham has worked as a dentist at Kaiser Permanente, Providence Health & Services, and the Randall Children's Hospital. He served as the president of the Washington County Dental Society and Oregon Academy of Pediatric Dentistry. From 2015 to 2019, Pham was a delegate of the American Dental Association. He served on the board of the Dentist Benefits Insurance Company, Pacific University, Oregon Board of Dentistry, and Dental Foundation of Oregon. Pham was elected to the Oregon House of Representatives in November 2022.

After Pham assumed office in January 2023, a complaint was filed with the Oregon secretary of state, alleging that Pham did not reside within the boundaries of his legislative district. The claim was not investigated.

Pham administered emergency dental care to Republican Senator Daniel Bonham during a House vs. Senate basketball game when Bonham was injured.

== Electoral history ==
Oregon House of Representatives 36th district election, 2022
Party	Candidate	Votes	%
Democratic	Hai Pham	19,629	61.4%
Republican	Greer Trice	12,272	38.4%
	Write-ins	52	0.2%

2024 Oregon State Representative, 36th district
Party	Candidate	Votes	%
Democratic	Hai Pham	23,250	62.9
Republican	Shawn Chummar	13,685	37.0
Write-in		40	0.1
Total votes		36,975	100%
