= Oregon's 32nd House district =

Legislative districts in the state of Oregon

Oregon's 32nd House district after redistricting after the 2020 Census

District 32 of the Oregon House of Representatives is one of 60 House legislative districts in the state of Oregon. As of 2021, the boundary for the district contains all of Clatsop and Tillamook counties and part of Columbia County encompassing the city of Clatskanie. The district includes the entire north Oregon Coast, including Astoria and Tillamook. The current representative for the district is Democrat Cyrus Javadi of Tillamook.

== Election results ==
District boundaries have changed over time. Therefore, representatives before 2021 may not represent the same constituency as today. General election results from 2000 to present are as follows:

Year	Candidate	Party	Percent	Opponent	Party	Percent	Opponent	Party	Percent	Opponent	Party	Percent	Write-in percentage
2000	Janet Carlson	Republican	50.47%	George Bell	Democratic	49.53%	No third candidate			No fourth candidate			
2002 (Note: Elaine Hopson was the incumbent in this election. She previously represented District 2, but was moved to this district due to redistricting following the 2000 United States census.)	Elaine Hopson	Democratic	51.26%	Joe Meyer	Republican	48.48%	No third candidate			No fourth candidate			0.27%
2004	Deborah Boone	Democratic	50.16%	Douglas Olson	Republican	46.88%	Ben Snodgrass	Constitution	2.96%	No fourth candidate			
2006	Deborah Boone	Democratic	61.86%	Norm Myers	Republican	37.88%	No third candidate			No fourth candidate			0.25%
2008	Deborah Boone	Democratic	66.78%	Tim Bero	Republican	32.89%	No third candidate			No fourth candidate			0.33%
2010	Deborah Boone	Democratic	52.22%	Lew Barnes	Republican	47.60%	No third candidate			No fourth candidate			0.18%
2012	Deborah Boone	Democratic	68.35%	Jim Welsh	Constitution	25.76%	Perry Roll	Libertarian	5.45%	No fourth candidate			0.44%
2014	Deborah Boone	Democratic	60.22%	Rick Rose	Republican	39.29%	No third candidate			No fourth candidate			0.48%
2016	Deborah Boone	Democratic	56.53%	Bruce Bobek	Republican	43.17%	No third candidate			No fourth candidate			0.30%
2018	Tiffiny Mitchell	Democratic	49.03%	Vineeta Lower	Republican	43.24%	Brian Halvorsen	Independent	4.21%	Randell Carlson	Libertarian	3.37%	0.15%
2020	Suzanne Weber	Republican	54.12%	Debbie Boothe-Schmidt	Democratic	45.68%	No third candidate			No fourth candidate			0.20%
2022	Cyrus Javadi	Republican	51.3%	Logan Laity	Democrat	48.60%	No third candidate			No fourth candidate			0.20%
2024	Cyrus Javadi	Republican	52.1%	Andy Davis	Democrat	47.7%	No third candidate			No fourth candidate			0.2%

== See also ==
- Oregon Legislative Assembly
- Oregon House of Representatives
