= Oregon's 17th Senate district =

American legislative district

Oregon's 17th Senate District as of September 27, 2021

District 17 of the Oregon State Senate comprises parts of Multnomah and Washington counties encompassing much of northwest Portland and suburbs of Beaverton. It is composed of Oregon House districts 33 and 34. It is currently represented by Democrat Lisa Reynolds of Portland, who was appointed in 2024 following Elizabeth Steiner's resignation after being elected treasurer.

== Election results ==
District boundaries have changed over time. Therefore, senators before 2013 may not represent the same constituency as today. From 1993 until 2003, the district covered parts of the Salem metropolitan area; from 2003 until 2013, it shifted to its current location on the border of Multnomah and Washington counties; and from 2013 until 2023, it moved slightly more south to encompass more of Beaverton.

The current district shifts slightly to the north and east from its previous iterations, losing most of Beaverton but gaining northern Washington County areas such as Bethany, Cedar Hills, Cedar Mill, Five Oaks, and Sylvan as well as almost all of northwest and downtown Portland.

The results are as follows:

Year	Candidate	Party	Percent	Opponent	Party	Percent	Opponent	Party	Percent	Opponent	Party	Percent
1982	C. T. Houck	Republican	52.9%	Jim Havel	Democratic	47.1%	No third candidate			No fourth candidate		
1986	C. T. Houck	Republican	52.0%	Peter Courtney	Democratic	48.0%	No third candidate			No fourth candidate		
1990	Tricia Smith	Democratic	54.3%	Don Wyant	Republican	45.7%	No third candidate			No fourth candidate		
1994	Shirley Stull	Republican	55.9%	Tricia Smith	Democratic	44.1%	No third candidate			No fourth candidate		
1998	Peter Courtney	Democratic	57.1%	Don Scott	Republican	42.9%	No third candidate			No fourth candidate		
2002	Charlie Ringo	Democratic	54.6%	Bill Witt	Republican	45.3%	No third candidate			No fourth candidate		
2006	Brad Avakian	Democratic	67.2%	Piotr Kuklinski	Republican	28.7%	Rich Whitehead	Libertarian	3.1%	John R. Pivarnik	Constitution	0.8%
2010	Suzanne Bonamici	Democratic	96.9%	Unopposed								
2012 (Note: Off-cycle election due to the resignation of Suzanne Bonamici upon her election to Congress representing Oregon's 1st congressional district. Elizabeth Steiner Hayward was the incumbent as she was appointed to the seat.)	Elizabeth Steiner Hayward	Democratic	66.4%	John Verbeek	Republican	33.4%	No third candidate			No fourth candidate		
2014	Elizabeth Steiner Hayward	Democratic	65.8%	John Verbeek	Republican	33.8%	No third candidate			No fourth candidate		
2018	Elizabeth Steiner Hayward	Democratic	97.7%	Unopposed								
2022	Elizabeth Steiner Hayward	Democratic	78.9%	John Verbeek	Republican	20.9%	No third candidate			No fourth candidate		
