= Hank Sanders (Oregon politician) =

American politician

Member-elect of the Oregon House of Representatives from the 52nd district
- Assuming office January 2027
- Succeeding: Jeff Helfrich

Personal details
- Party: Democratic
- Parent: Lisa Reynolds (mother)

Hank Sanders is an American politician. A member of the Democratic Party, he is the member-elect for the 52nd district of the Oregon House of Representatives.
