= Tsunami Warning, Education, and Research Act of 2014 =

- Long title: To authorize and strengthen the tsunami detection, forecast, warning, research, and mitigation program of the National Oceanic and Atmospheric Administration, and for other purposes.
- Announced in: the 113th United States Congress
- Sponsored by: Rep. Suzanne Bonamici (D, OR-1)
- Number of co-sponsors: 5

Codification
- U.S.C. sections affected: 33 U.S.C. § 3204, 33 U.S.C. § 3203, 33 U.S.C. § 3201 et seq., 33 U.S.C. § 3206, 33 U.S.C. § 3205, and others.
- Agencies affected: National Oceanic and Atmospheric Administration, United States Congress, United Nations, United States Department of State, Federal Emergency Management Agency
- Authorizations of appropriations: $81,000,000 over year(s) 2015, 2016 and 2017

Legislative history
- Introduced in the House as H.R. 5309 by Rep. Suzanne Bonamici (D, OR-1) on July 31, 2014; Committee consideration by United States House Committee on Science, Space and Technology, United States Senate Committee on Commerce, Science, and Transportation; Passed the House on September 8, 2014 (voice vote)

The Tsunami Warning, Education, and Research Act of 2014 (H.R. 5309) is a bill that would authorize the National Oceanic and Atmospheric Administration (NOAA) to spend $27 million a year for three years on their on-going tsunami warning and research programs.

The bill was introduced into the United States House of Representatives during the 113th United States Congress.

== Background ==
3D tsunami simulation

A tsunami, also known as a seismic sea wave, is a series of water waves caused by the displacement of a large volume of a body of water, generally an ocean or a large lake. Earthquakes, volcanic eruptions and other underwater explosions (including detonations of underwater nuclear devices), landslides, glacier calvings, meteorite impacts and other disturbances above or below water all have the potential to generate a tsunami.

Tsunami waves do not resemble normal sea waves, because their wavelength is far longer. Rather than appearing as a breaking wave, a tsunami may instead initially resemble a rapidly rising tide, and for this reason they are often referred to as tidal waves. Tsunamis generally consist of a series of waves with periods ranging from minutes to hours, arriving in a so-called "wave train". Wave heights of tens of metres can be generated by large events. Although the impact of tsunamis is limited to coastal areas, their destructive power can be enormous and they can affect entire ocean basins; the 2004 Indian Ocean tsunami was among the deadliest natural disasters in human history with at least 290,000 people killed or missing in 14 countries bordering the Indian Ocean.

== Summary of provisions ==
The bill authorizes the National Oceanic and Atmospheric Administration (NOAA) to continue through 2017 its on-going programs to forecast tsunamis. The bill would authorize NOAA to spend $27 million a year on this program over fiscal years 2015, 2016, and 2017.

== Procedural history ==
The Tsunami Warning, Education, and Research Act of 2014 was introduced into the United States House of Representatives on July 31, 2014 by Rep. Suzanne Bonamici (D, OR-1). The bill was referred to the United States House Committee on Science, Space and Technology. On September 8, 2014, the House voted to pass the bill in a voice vote. The bill was received in the United States Senate on September 9, 2014 and referred to the United States Senate Committee on Commerce, Science, and Transportation.

== Debate and discussion ==
Rep. Bonamici, who introduced the bill, said that "the coastlines of the United States already play an integral role in the economic prosperity of this country and we must strengthen their preparedness and resiliency so they can continue to play that role going forward." Bonamici also said that the bill "will improve the country's understanding of the threat posed by tsunami events" because it will "improve forecasting and notification systems, support local community outreach and preparedness and response plans, and develop supportive technologies."

Rep. Dana Rohrabacher (R-CA) also supported the bill, saying that, because of the devastating nature of tsunamis, "we must learn more about tsunami events, provide better and more accurate tsunami forecasting, and reduce impacts on at-risk communities."

== See also ==
- List of bills in the 113th United States Congress
