= Oregon's 36th House district =

Legislative districts in the state of Oregon

Oregon's 36th House district after redistricting after the 2020 Census

District 36 of the Oregon House of Representatives is one of 60 House legislative districts in the state of Oregon. As of 2021, the district is contained entirely within Washington County and includes southern Beaverton and Hillsboro. The current representative for the district is Democrat Hai Pham.

== Election results ==
District boundaries have changed over time. Therefore, representatives before 2021 may not represent the same constituency as today. General election results from 2000 to present are as follows:

Year	Candidate	Party	Percent	Opponent	Party	Percent	Opponent	Party	Percent	Write-in percentage
2000	Betsy Close	Republican	56.04%	John Donovan	Democratic	43.96%	No third candidate			
2002 (Note: Mary Nolan was the incumbent in this election. She previously represented District 11, but was moved to this district due to redistricting following the 2000 United States census.)	Mary Nolan	Democratic	95.95%	Unopposed						4.05%
2004	Mary Nolan	Democratic	86.70%	Joe Tabor	Libertarian	12.32%	No third candidate			0.98%
2006	Mary Nolan	Democratic	84.77%	Frank Dane	Libertarian	14.66%	No third candidate			0.57%
2008	Mary Nolan	Democratic	81.21%	Steve Oppenheim	Republican	14.83%	Jay Ellefson	Libertarian	3.64%	0.31%
2010	Mary Nolan	Democratic	78.42%	Diane Schendel	Republican	21.30%	No third candidate			0.28%
2012	Jennifer Williamson	Democratic	82.22%	Bruce Neal	Republican	17.39%	No third candidate			0.40%
2014	Jennifer Williamson	Democratic	85.04%	Amanda Burnham	Libertarian	14.16%	No third candidate			0.79%
2016	Jennifer Williamson	Democratic	88.73%	Amanda Burnham	Libertarian	10.81%	No third candidate			0.46%
2018	Jennifer Williamson	Democratic	98.05%	Unopposed						1.95%
2020	Lisa Reynolds	Democratic	83.06%	James Ball	Republican	16.78%	No third candidate			0.16%
2022	Hai Pham	Democratic	61.43%	Greer Trice	Republican	38.41%	No third candidate			0.16%
2024	Hai Pham	Democratic	62.9%	Shawn Chummar	Republican	37.0%	No third candidate			0.1%

== See also ==
- Oregon Legislative Assembly
- Oregon House of Representatives
