= Elaine Hopson =

American politician (born 1939)

Elaine M. Hopson

Member of the Oregon House of Representatives from the 32nd district
- In office January 11, 1999 – July 7, 2004
- Preceded by: Tim Josi
- Succeeded by: Deborah Boone

Personal details
- Born: April 30, 1939 (age 87) Juneau, Alaska
- Party: Democratic
- Children: Scott and Curtis
- Occupation: School superintendent

Elaine M. Hopson (born April 30, 1939) is an American politician from the state of Oregon. She served as a Democratic member of the Oregon House of Representatives, where she represented District 32. She was first elected in 1998, and resigned in 2004. Deborah Boone was appointed to finish her term.

== Early life ==
Hopson earned a BA from Purdue University in 1959. She earned a MA from Oregon State University in 1960. She earned a PhD from University of Oregon in 1988.

== Career ==
Hopson was endorsed by AFL-CIO.
