= Elizabeth Steiner =

American politician (born 1963)

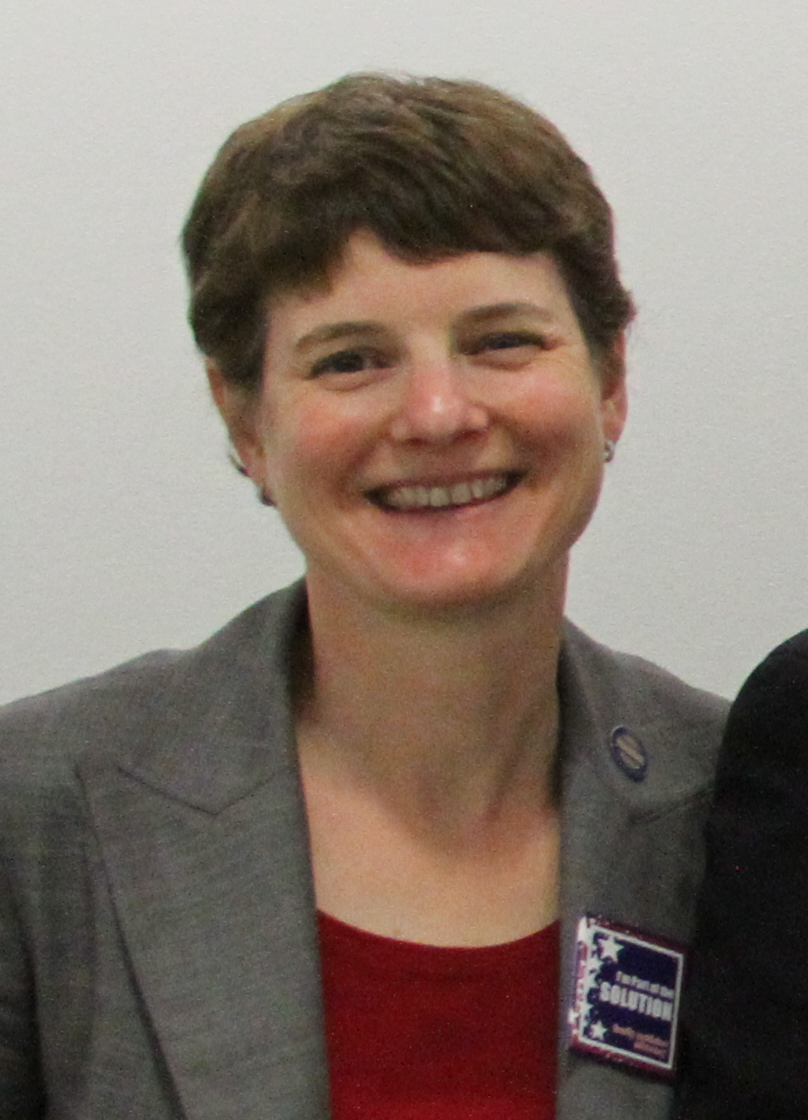

30th Treasurer of Oregon
- Incumbent
- Assumed office January 6, 2025
- Governor: Tina Kotek
- Preceded by: Tobias Read

Member of the Oregon Senate from the 17th district
- In office January 5, 2012 – November 7, 2024
- Preceded by: Suzanne Bonamici
- Succeeded by: Lisa Reynolds

Personal details
- Born: April 5, 1963 (age 63) Massachusetts, U.S.
- Party: Democratic
- Children: 3
- Education: University of Chicago (BA); University of Massachusetts, Worcester (MD)
- Website: Campaign website

Elizabeth Steiner (born April 5, 1963), also known as Elizabeth Steiner Hayward, is a Democratic politician who is currently serving as the 30th Treasurer of Oregon since 2025. She previously served as a member of the Oregon Senate, representing the 17th district. Steiner was appointed to the Senate in 2011 by commissioners from Multnomah and Washington counties following the resignation of her predecessor, Suzanne Bonamici.

On November 5, 2024, Steiner defeated state senator Brian Boquist in the 2024 Oregon State Treasurer election, becoming the first woman to be elected treasurer in Oregon.

== Career ==
Steiner is an adjunct associate professor of family medicine at Oregon Health & Science University (OHSU). She is a past president of the Oregon Academy of Family Physicians.

In November 2018, Steiner was appointed to co-chair the Oregon legislature's joint ways and means committee, serving with senator Betsy Johnson. She remained in the role until 2024, when she stepped down to focus on her run for state treasurer.

On September 13, 2023, Steiner announced her candidacy for state treasurer in the 2024 election. On May 21, 2024, Steiner won the Democratic primary with 77% of the vote. On November 5, 2024, Steiner defeated Republican state senator Brian Boquist in the general election, becoming the first woman to be elected to the position.

== Personal life ==
In 2013, Steiner publicly revealed she has major depressive disorder and multiple sclerosis.

Steiner lives in Northwest Portland and has three adult children, one of whom is non-binary. Steiner is Jewish and bisexual.

== Electoral history ==
2024 Oregon State Treasurer election
| Party | Candidate | Votes | % |
|---|---|---|---|
| Democratic | Elizabeth Steiner | 1,050,119 | 49.4 |
| Republican | Brian J Boquist | 919,794 | 43.2 |
| Working Families | Mary King | 155,473 | 7.3 |
| Write-in | | 1,882 | 0.1 |
| Total votes | | 2,127,268 | 100% |

2022 State Senator, 17th District
| Party | Candidate | Votes | % |
|---|---|---|---|
| Democratic | Elizabeth Steiner Hayward | 46,647 | 78.9 |
| Republican | John Verbeek | 12,377 | 20.9 |
| Write-in | | 86 | 0.1 |
| Total votes | | 59,110 | 100% |

2018 State Senator, 17th District
| Party | Candidate | Votes | % |
|---|---|---|---|
| Democratic | Elizabeth Steiner Hayward | 46,784 | 97.7 |
| Write-in | | 1,094 | 2.3 |
| Total votes | | 47,878 | 100% |

2014 State Senator, 17th District
| Party | Candidate | Votes | % |
|---|---|---|---|
| Democratic | Elizabeth Steiner Hayward | 30,677 | 65.9 |
| Republican | John Verbeek | 15,697 | 33.7 |
| Write-in | | 201 | 0.4 |
| Total votes | | 46,575 | 100% |

2012 State Senator, 17th District
| Party | Candidate | Votes | % |
|---|---|---|---|
| Democratic | Elizabeth Steiner Hayward | 37,545 | 66.4 |
| Republican | John Verbeek | 18,879 | 33.4 |
| Write-in | | 120 | 0.2 |
| Total votes | | 56,544 | 100% |

Party political offices
| Preceded by Tobias Read | Democratic nominee for Treasurer of Oregon; 2024 | Most recent |
Political offices
| Preceded by Tobias Read | Treasurer of Oregon; 2025–present | Incumbent |
