= Jennifer Williamson =

American politician

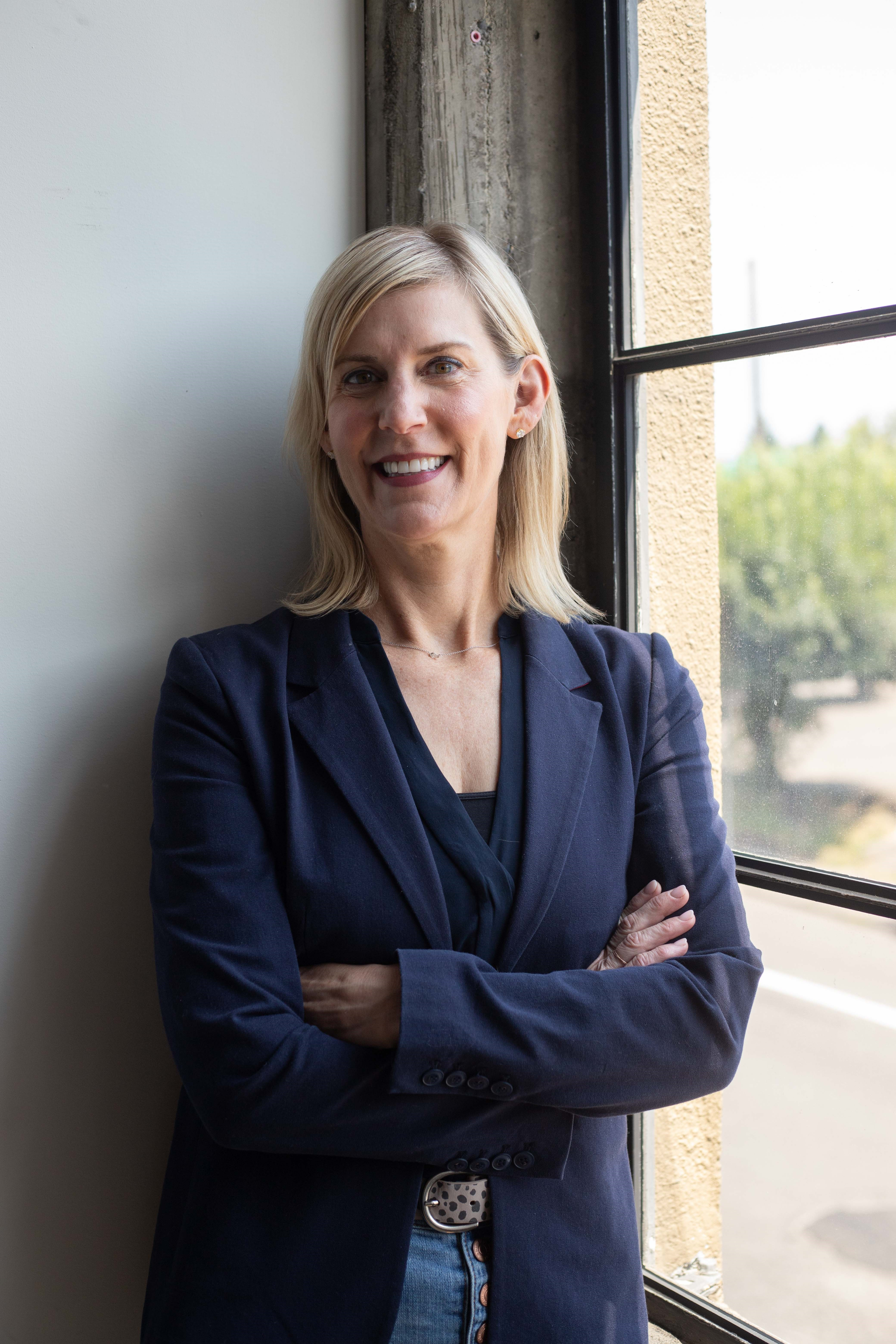

Majority Leader of the Oregon House of Representatives
- In office July 10, 2015 – July 19, 2019
- Preceded by: Val Hoyle
- Succeeded by: Barbara Smith Warner

Member of the Oregon House of Representatives from the 36th district
- In office January 12, 2013 – January 16, 2020
- Preceded by: Mary Nolan
- Succeeded by: Akasha Lawrence-Spence

Personal details
- Born: November 16, 1973 (age 52) Washington County, Oregon, U.S.
- Party: Democratic
- Education: University of Oregon (BA); Willamette University (JD)

Jennifer Williamson (born 1973) is an American attorney, Democratic politician, and political strategist who represented Oregon's 36th District in the Oregon House of Representatives. She served as Majority Leader from 2015 to 2019.

== Early life and education ==
Born in Washington County, Oregon, Williamson graduated from the University of Oregon, and received a J.D. degree from Willamette University College of Law.

== Political career ==
In 2012, she defeated Sharon Meieran in the Democratic primary to replace state representative Mary Nolan.

Williamson was named a 2014 Aspen Institute Rodel Fellow.

On February 10, 2020, Williamson abruptly dropped out of the race for Oregon Secretary of State in response to allegations of unusual campaign spending while an Oregon House member. Williamson has defended her campaign expenditures as legal under Oregon campaign finance laws and ethics regulations.

Williamson currently works for political consulting and government affairs firm Swift Public Affairs. She previously served as the interim executive director for Planned Parenthood Advocates of Oregon.

== Electoral history ==
2012 Oregon State Representative, 36th district
Party	Candidate	Votes	%
Democratic	Jennifer Williamson	26,785	82.2
Republican	Bruce Neal	5,664	17.4
Write-in		129	0.4
Total votes		32,578	100%

2014 Oregon State Representative, 36th district
Party	Candidate	Votes	%
Democratic	Jennifer Williamson	21,626	85.0
Libertarian	Amanda Burnham	3,602	14.2
Write-in		202	0.8
Total votes		25,430	100%

2016 Oregon State Representative, 36th district
Party	Candidate	Votes	%
Democratic	Jennifer Williamson	28,875	88.7
Libertarian	Amanda Burnham	3,519	10.8
Write-in		149	0.5
Total votes		32,543	100%

2018 Oregon State Representative, 36th district
Party	Candidate	Votes	%
Democratic	Jennifer Williamson	28,081	98.0
Write-in		559	2.0
Total votes		28,640	100%

Oregon House of Representatives
Preceded by Val Hoyle	Majority Leader of the Oregon House of Representatives; 2015–2019	Succeeded by Barbara Smith Warner
