= Suzanne Weber =

American politician

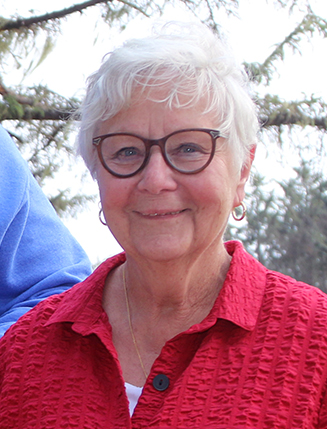

Member of the Oregon State Senate from the 16th district
- Incumbent
- Assumed office January 9, 2023
- Preceded by: Rachel Armitage
- Succeeded by: Courtney Bangs (elect)

Member of the Oregon House of Representatives from the 32nd district
- In office January 11, 2021 – January 9, 2023
- Preceded by: Tiffiny Mitchell
- Succeeded by: Cyrus Javadi

Personal details
- Party: Republican
- Website: https://weberfororegon.com

Suzanne Weber is an American politician who has served in the Oregon State Senate since 2023, representing the 16th district, which covers all of Clatsop, Columbia, and Tillamook counties and parts of Washington, Multnomah, and Yamhill counties. A member of the Republican Party, she is the Senate Republican whip. She previously served in the Oregon House of Representatives, on the Tillamook city council, and as the city's mayor.

Weber was one of the Republican senators who took part in the 2023 Oregon Senate walkout. Under Measure 113, she was barred from seeking reelection in 2026, and her term ends in January 2027.

== Early life and career ==
Weber was born in Orr, Minnesota. She moved to Tillamook in 1970, taught elementary education for 30 years, and operated two small businesses.

Weber served on Tillamook City Council beginning in 2002 and was elected mayor in 2010.

== Oregon House of Representatives ==
Weber won the Republican nomination for Oregon's 32nd House district in the May 2020 primary, defeated Vineeta Lower with 80% of the vote. In the November general election, she defeated Democrat Debbie Boothe-Schmidt in the 2020 election, winning 54.1% to 45.7%. Weber served from 2021 to 2023, when she moved to the Senate. Cyrus Javadi succeeded her in the House.

== Oregon Senate ==
Weber was unopposed for the Republican nomination for the 16th Senate district in the May 2022 primary. The seat was open because Senator Betsy Johnson had resigned to run for governor. Weber won the November 2022 general election by about 13 points, and took office in January 2023. The seat had been held by Democrats for about two decades.

=== 2023 GOP Walkout ===
On May 3, 2023, Weber joined other Republican senators in a walkout over House Bill 2002, which addressed reproductive health care and gender-affirming care, denying the Senate a quorum. The same day the walkout began, Weber and Representative Emily McIntire filed a lawsuit against legislative leaders challenging the bill's summary as not easy enough to understand, represented by Oregon Right to Life. The walkout lasted until June 15.

Under Measure 113, which disqualifies legislators with ten or more unexcused absences from seeking reelection, Weber was among the senators to reach that threshold. On August 25, Weber and four other Republican senators petitioned the Oregon Supreme Court to overturn the Secretary of State's rule applying the measure to the term immediately following their current terms. They argued that the measure's wording allowed them to serve one more term before the bar took effect. The court heard oral arguments beginning December 14, 2023, and ruled against them on February 1, 2024 in a unanimous opinion, thus barring Weber from running for reelection in 2026. Weber stood by her decision to take part in the walkout.

== Electoral history ==
2022 Oregon Senate 16th district election
Party	Candidate	Votes	%
Republican	Suzanne Weber	41,144	56.5
Democratic	Melissa Busch	31,585	43.4
Write-in		74	0.10
Total votes		72,803	100.0

2022 Oregon Senate 16th district Republican primary
Party	Candidate	Votes	%
Republican	Suzanne Weber	11,744	98.5
Republican	Write-in	176	1.4
Total votes		11,920	100.0

2020 Oregon House of Representatives 32nd district election
Party	Candidate	Votes	%
Republican	Suzanne Weber	21,941	54.1
Democratic	Debbie Boothe-Schmidt	18,520	45.7
Write-in		81	0.2
Total votes		40,542	100.0

2020 Oregon House of Representatives 32nd district Republican primary
Party	Candidate	Votes	%
Republican	Suzanne Weber	5,980	79.9
Republican	Vineeta Lower	1,466	19.6
Republican	Write-in	36	0.5
Total votes		7,482	100.0
