= Suzanne Bonamici =

American politician (born 1954)

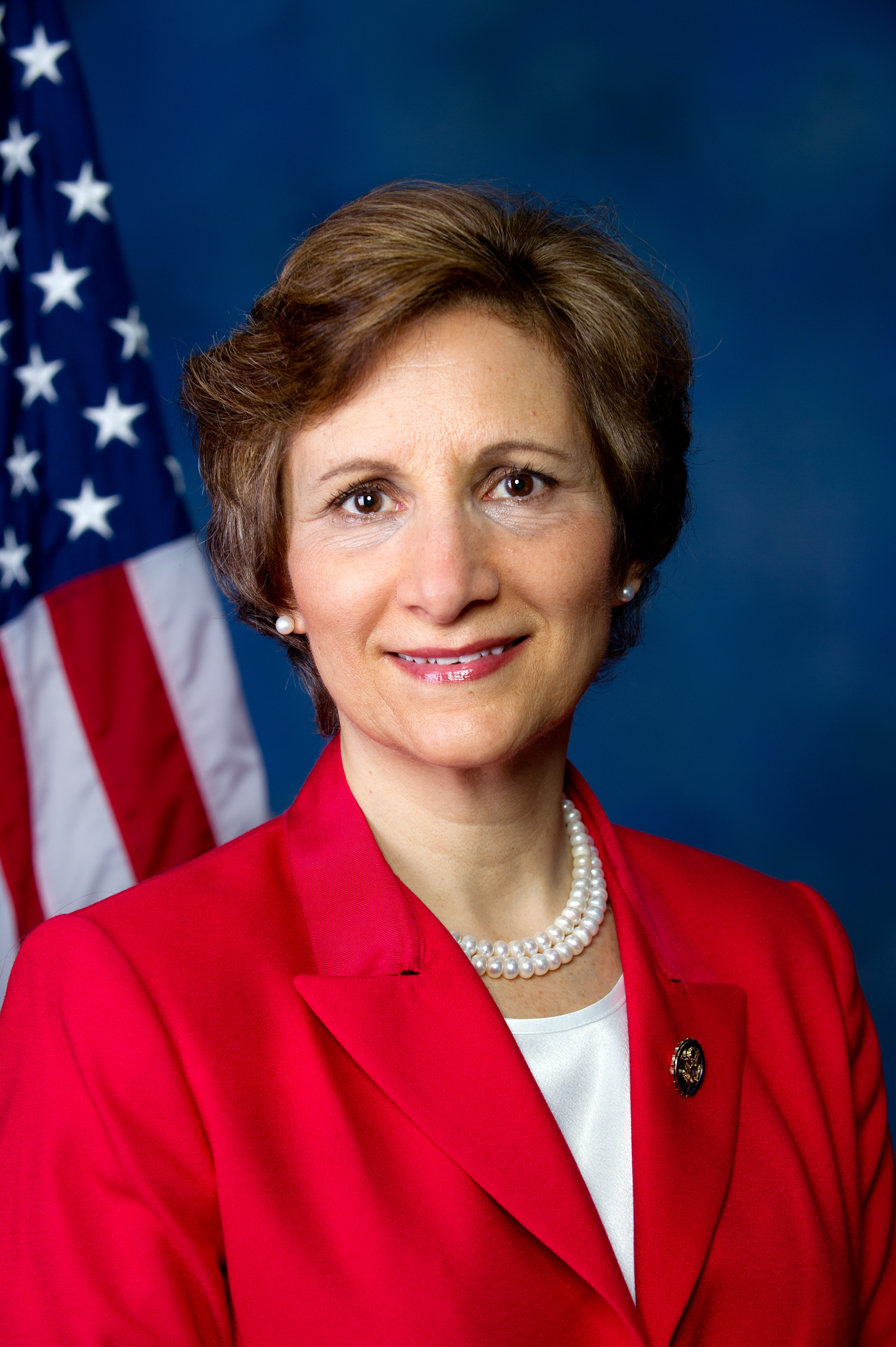
- Official portrait, 2012

Member of the U.S. House of Representatives from Oregon's 1st district
- Incumbent
- Assumed office February 7, 2012
- Preceded by: David Wu

Member of the Oregon Senate from the 17th district
- In office May 19, 2008 – November 21, 2011
- Preceded by: Brad Avakian
- Succeeded by: Elizabeth Steiner

Member of the Oregon House of Representatives from the 34th district
- In office January 2, 2007 – May 19, 2008
- Preceded by: Brad Avakian
- Succeeded by: Chris Harker

Personal details
- Born: Suzanne Marie Bonamici; October 14, 1954 (age 72) Detroit, Michigan, U.S.
- Party: Democratic
- Spouse: Michael Simon (m. 1984)
- Children: 2
- Relatives: Neil Simon (by marriage)
- Education: Lane Community College (AA); University of Oregon (BA, JD)
- Website: House website Campaign website
- Bonamici's voice Bonamici supporting the Equal Rights Amendment. Recorded February 13, 2020

Suzanne Marie Bonamici (/ˌbɒnəˈmiːtʃi/ BONN-ə-MEE-chee; born October 14, 1954) is an American lawyer and politician serving as the U.S. representative for Oregon's 1st congressional district, a seat she was first elected to in a 2012 special election. The district includes most of Portland west of the Willamette River, along with most of Portland's western suburbs such as Beaverton, Hillsboro, Tigard, and Lake Oswego.

A Democrat, Bonamici represented the 17th district in the Oregon State Senate from 2008 to 2011. She was first elected to the Oregon House of Representatives in 2006.

== Early life and legal career ==
Bonamici was born in Detroit. She earned an associate degree from Lane Community College in 1978, and a bachelor's degree in 1980 and J.D. in 1983, both from the University of Oregon. After college, she became a legal assistant at Lane County Legal Aid in Eugene. After law school, she became a consumer protection attorney for the Federal Trade Commission in Washington, D.C. She went into private practice in Portland and represented small businesses.

== Oregon legislature ==
=== Elections ===
In 2006, incumbent Democratic State Representative Brad Avakian decided to retire to run for the Oregon Senate. Bonamici ran for the open seat in Oregon's 34th House district and defeated Republican Joan Draper, 62%-36%.

On April 30, 2008, commissioners from Washington and Multnomah counties appointed Bonamici to represent Oregon's 17th Senate district. The seat became vacant when Avakian was appointed Commissioner of the Oregon Bureau of Labor and Industries. She was sworn in on May 19, 2008.

Bonamici was unopposed in the November 2008 special election for the balance of Avakian's four-year term, and was elected with 97% of the vote. In 2010, she was reelected with 64% of the vote.

== U.S. House of Representatives ==
=== Elections ===
Special election

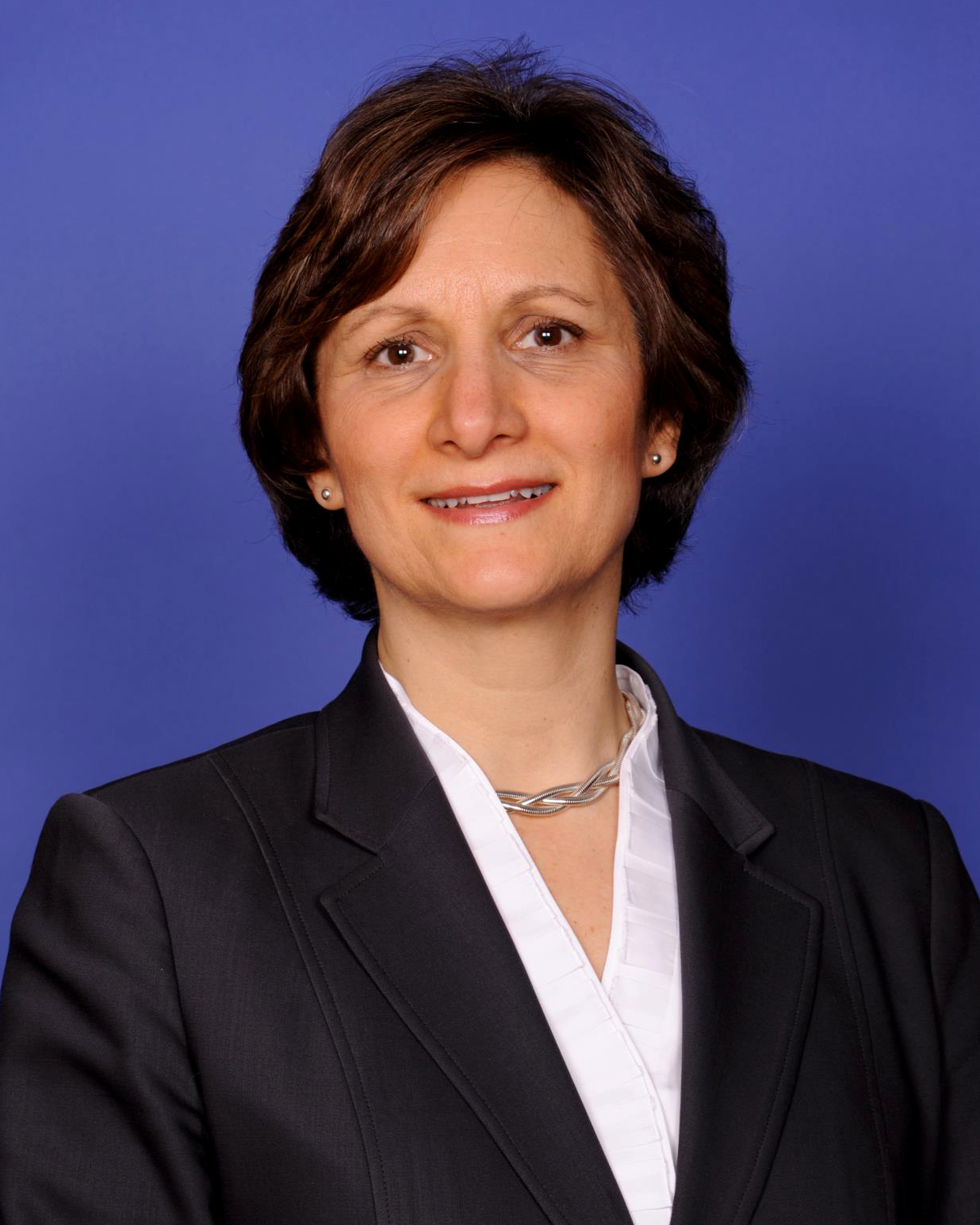
Bonamici during the 112th Congress

In early 2011, Bonamici was mentioned as a possible successor to Representative David Wu after The Oregonian and Willamette Week reported that Wu exhibited odd behavior and clashed with his staff amid apparent mental illness during the 2010 election cycle. After Wu resigned from Congress, Bonamici announced her candidacy for the special election to replace him, touting endorsements from former Governor Barbara Roberts, former Congresswoman Elizabeth Furse, and incumbent Oregon Attorney General John Kroger, among others.

On November 8, 2011, Bonamici won the Democratic Party of Oregon's nomination, with a majority of the vote in every county in the district and 66% of the vote overall, a 44-point margin over second-place finisher Brad Avakian. She defeated Republican nominee Rob Cornilles in the January 31, 2012, special election by a 14-point margin.

Before her election to Congress, Bonamici resigned from the Oregon Senate on November 21, and was replaced by Elizabeth Steiner Hayward in December.

2012 regular election

In November 2012, Bonamici was reelected to her first full term with over 60% of the vote.

=== Tenure ===
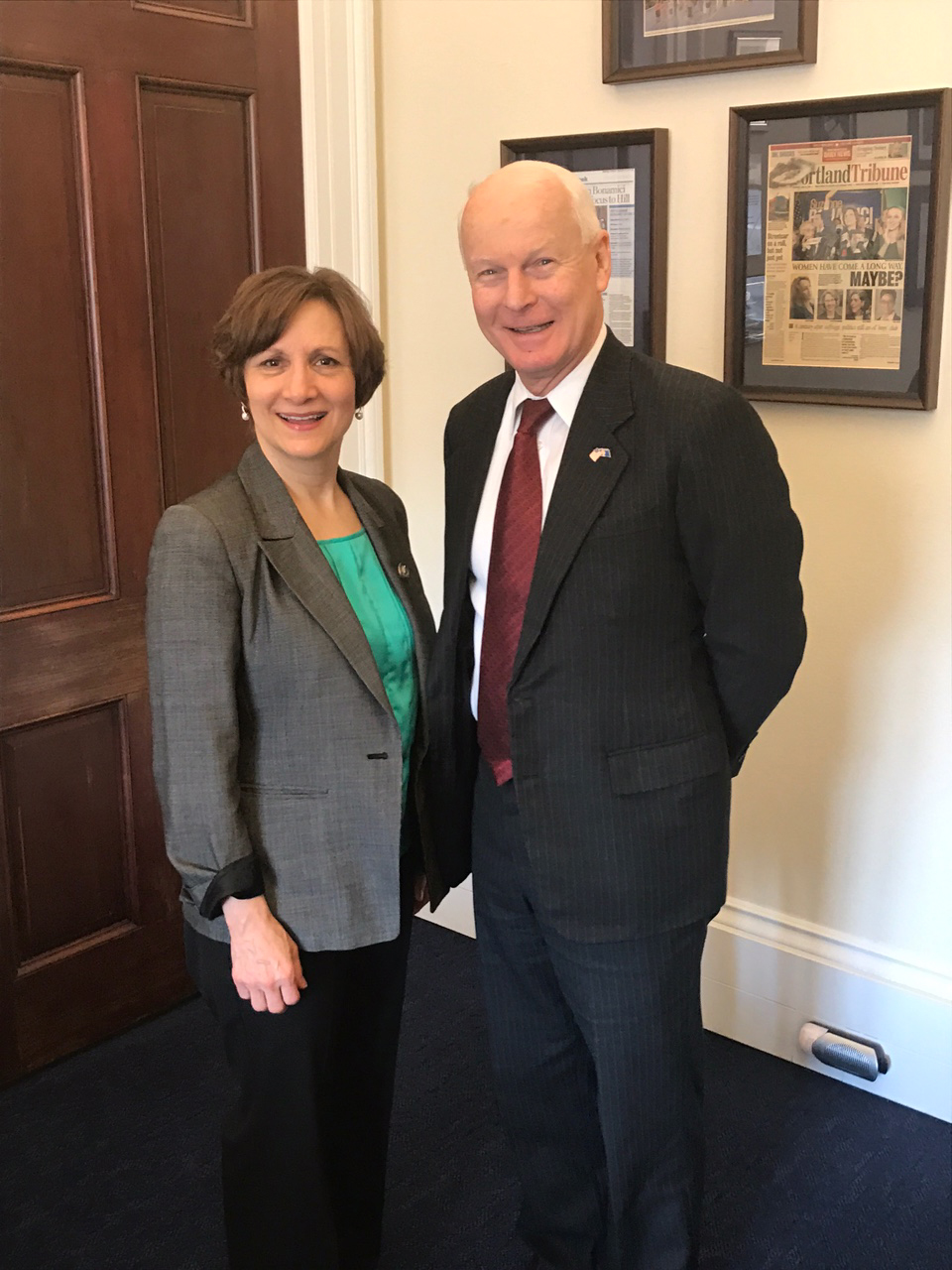
Bonamici with Oregon Secretary of State Dennis Richardson

On July 31, 2014, Bonamici introduced the Tsunami Warning, Education, and Research Act of 2014 into the House. The bill would authorize the National Oceanic and Atmospheric Administration (NOAA) to spend $27 million a year for three years on their ongoing tsunami warning and research programs.

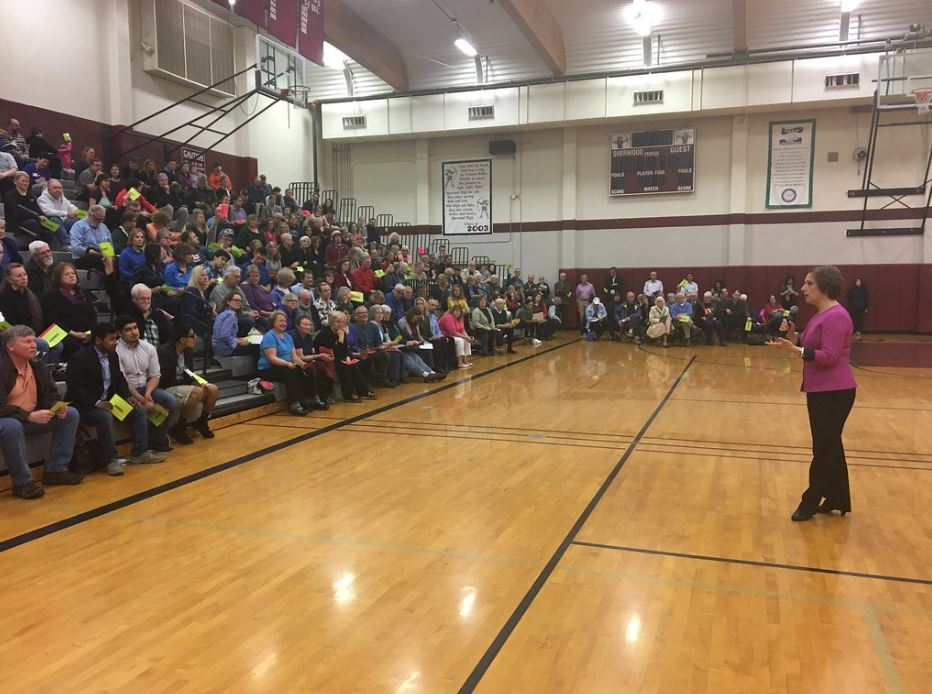
Bonamici speaks at a town hall meeting in Sherwood in April 2017

Bonamici said, "the coastlines of the United States already play an integral role in the economic prosperity of this country and we must strengthen their preparedness and resiliency so they can continue to play that role going forward." She added that the bill "will improve the country's understanding of the threat posed by tsunami events" because it will "improve forecasting and notification systems, support local community outreach and preparedness and response plans, and develop supportive technologies."

In January 2023, Bonamici was one of 13 cosponsors of an amendment to the Constitution of the United States extending the right to vote to citizens sixteen years of age or older.

During the 117th Congress, Bonamici voted with President Joe Biden's stated position 99.1% of the time according to a FiveThirtyEight analysis. She was among the 46 Democrats who voted against final passage of the Fiscal Responsibility Act of 2023 in the House.

Bonamici voted to provide Israel with support following October 7 attacks.

=== Committee assignments ===
- Committee on Science, Space and Technology
  - United States House Science Subcommittee on Environment
  - United States House Science Subcommittee on Investigations and Oversight
- Committee on Education and the Workforce
  - Subcommittee on Civil Rights and Human Services (chair)
  - Subcommittee on Higher Education and Workforce Training
- Select Committee on the Climate Crisis

=== Caucuses memberships ===
- Black Maternal Health Caucus
- Congressional STEAM Caucus
- Congressional Equality Caucus
- Congressional Progressive Caucus.
- Congressional Taiwan Caucus
- Congressional Arts Caucus
- Congressional Asian Pacific American Caucus
- Climate Solutions Caucus
- Medicare for All Caucus
- Congressional Coalition on Adoption
- Congressional Caucus for the Equal Rights Amendment
- Rare Disease Caucus
- Congressional Freethought Caucus

== Electoral history ==
=== Oregon Legislature ===
2006 Oregon State Representative, 34th district
Party	Candidate	Votes	%
Democratic	Suzanne Bonamici	11,780	61.5
Republican	Joan Draper	6,902	36.0
Libertarian	Gregory F. Rohde	439	2.3
Write-in		27	0.1
Total votes		19,148	100%

2008 Oregon State Senator, 17th district
Party	Candidate	Votes	%
Democratic	Suzanne Bonamici	44,475	96.9
Write-in		1,423	3.1
Total votes		45,898	100%

2010 Oregon State Senator, 17th district
Party	Candidate	Votes	%
Democratic	Suzanne Bonamici	32,281	64.0
Republican	Stevan C Kirkpatrick	18,041	35.8
Write-in		87	0.2
Total votes		50,409	100%

=== United States Congress ===
Oregon's 1st congressional district: Results 2012–2024
Year	Democratic	Votes	Pct	Republican	Votes	Pct	3rd Party	Party	Votes	Pct		3rd Party	Party	Votes	Pct	3rd Party	Party	Votes	Pct
2012 (Special)	Suzanne Bonamici	113,404	53.8%	Rob Cornilles	83,396	39.6%	Steve Reynolds	Progressive	6,798	3.2%		James Foster	Libertarian	6,618	3.1%	Write-ins		547	0.3%
2012	Suzanne Bonamici	197,845	59.6%	Delinda Morgan	109,699	33.0%	Steve Reynolds	Progressive	15,009	4.5%	*	Bob Ekstrom	Constitution	8,918	2.7%	Write-ins		509	0.2%
2014	Suzanne Bonamici	160,038	57.3%	Jason Yates	96,245	34.5%	James Foster	Libertarian	11,213	4.0%		Steve Reynolds	Pacific Green	11,163	4.0%	Write-ins		597	0.2%
2016	Suzanne Bonamici	225,391	59.6%	Brian Heinrich	139,756	37.0%	Kyle Sheahan	Libertarian	12,257	3.2%		Write-ins		691	0.2%				
2018	Suzanne Bonamici	231,198	63.6%	John Verbeek	116,446	32.1%	Drew Layda	Libertarian	15,121	4.2%		Write-ins		484	0.1%				
2020	Suzanne Bonamici	297,071	64.6%	Christopher Christensen	161,928	35.2%	Write-ins		900	0.2%									
2022	Suzanne Bonamici	210,682	67.9%	Christopher Mann	99,042	31.9%	Write-ins		519	0.2%									
2024	Suzanne Bonamici	241,556	68.6%	Bob Todd	98,908	28.1%	Joe Christman	Libertarian	10,840	3.1%		Write-ins		687	0.2%				

* In the 2012 election, Steve Reynolds was co-nominated by the Libertarian and Pacific Green parties.

== Personal life ==
Bonamici is married to Michael H. Simon, a federal judge. They have two children. Bonamici was raised Episcopalian and Unitarian, and subsequently converted to Judaism. She attends Congregation Beth Israel with her husband (who was born Jewish), and their children.

== See also ==
- Women in the United States House of Representatives

U.S. House of Representatives
Preceded by David Wu	Member of the U.S. House of Representatives from Oregon's 1st congressional district 2012–present	Incumbent
U.S. order of precedence (ceremonial)
Preceded by Mark Amodei	United States representatives by seniority 94th	Succeeded by Suzan DelBene
