= Bonny Slope, Oregon =

Unincorporated community in the state of Oregon, United States

Bonny Slope
- Unincorporated community
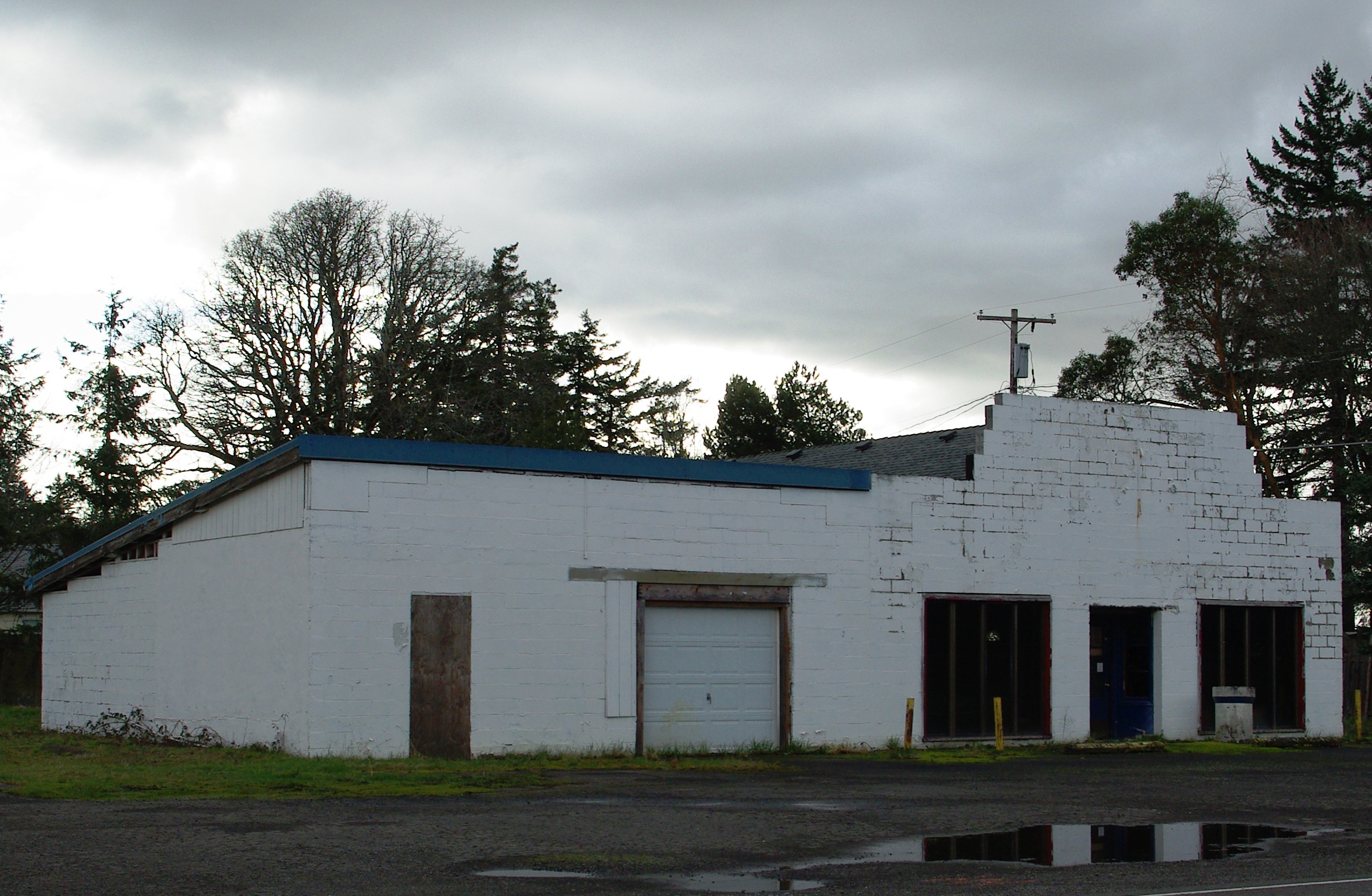
- Former commercial building in the area

- Location within the state of Oregon Bonny Slope (the United States)
- Coordinates: 45°32′44″N 122°46′59″W
- Country: United States
- State: Oregon
- County: Washington
- Time zone: UTC-8 (Pacific (PST))
  - Summer (DST): UTC-7 (PDT)

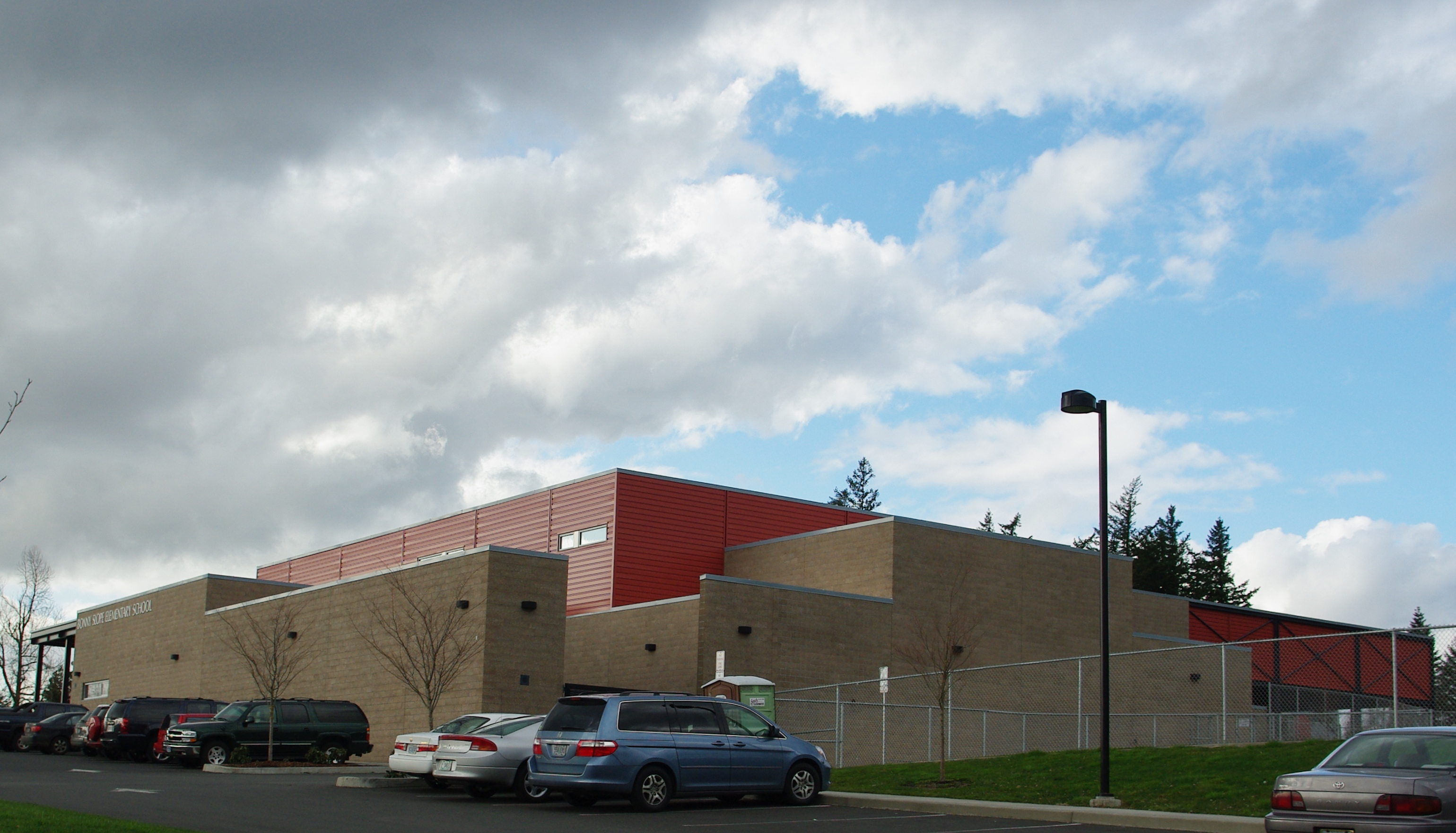
Bonny Slope Elementary School

Bonny Slope is an unincorporated community in Washington County, Oregon, United States. Bonny Slope lies on Thompson Road north of Beaverton and northwest of Portland.

One of the first businesses in the area was Potter's Mill, founded circa 1900. It was purchased by E.O. Potter in 1903. Fires, including those in 1940 and 1951, devastated forests around the area. The last lumber mill in Bonny Slope was established following the August 1951 fire and lasted about six months.

During the Prohibition era, illegal moonshine production was rampant in the area. Violet Frost writes in her book The Bonny Slope Story, "The logs were stacked to give the appearance of solidity, but they concealed a small room. To obtain his liquor, a customer needed only to drive on the bridge, walk around to the trap door, and pick up his supply." The production was eventually exposed, and operations shut down.

Plank roads had long existed in the community, built in the early 1900s using the lumber from local mills, including Potter's Mill. Several contemporary major roads in Bonny Slope were created due to petitions from residents, such as McDaniel Road in 1928, Thompson Road in 1929, and Laidlaw Road in 1932. Minor roads were only paved in the 1990s, and some remain unpaved to this day.
