= Tiffiny Mitchell =

American politician

Member of the Oregon House of Representatives from the 32nd district
- In office January 2019 – January 11, 2021
- Preceded by: Deborah Boone
- Succeeded by: Suzanne Weber

Personal details
- Party: Democratic
- Education: University of Utah (BA); Western Governors University (MA)

Tiffiny Mitchell is an American politician who served as a member of the Oregon House of Representatives from the 32nd district from 2019 to 2021, as a Democrat. Her districted included Astoria, Oregon.

== Education ==
Mitchell earned a Bachelor of Arts degree in Film Studies from the University of Utah and a Master of Arts in Business Administration from Western Governors University. She earned a paralegal certificate from Penn Foster College.

== Career ==
Prior to entering politics, Mitchell worked in the unemployment insurance unit of Utah Department of Workforce Services. She then moved to Oregon, where she worked for the Clatsop Circuit Court and Oregon Department of Human Services. Mitchell was elected on the November 6, 2018 election, succeeding Deborah Boone. She took office in 2019. In December 2019, Mitchell faced an unsuccessful recall after her vote on greenhouse gas emissions. On March 11, 2020, Mitchell announced that she would not seek re-election in 2020.

=== Recall attempt ===
In late 2019, #TimberUnity, a Timber industry activist group, attempted to recall Mitchell. The effort failed to acquire 4,883 signatures for ballot access.

== Electoral history ==
2018 Oregon State Representative, 32nd district
| Party | Candidate | Votes | % |
|---|---|---|---|
| Democratic | Tiffiny K Mitchell | 15,442 | 49.0 |
| Republican | Vineeta Lower | 13,618 | 43.2 |
| Independent | Brian P Halvorsen | 1,325 | 4.2 |
| Libertarian | Randell Carlson | 1,061 | 3.4 |
| Write-in | | 47 | 0.1 |
| Total votes | | 31,493 | 100% |
