= Bethany, Oregon =

Unincorporated community in the state of Oregon, United States

Bethany
- Census designated place
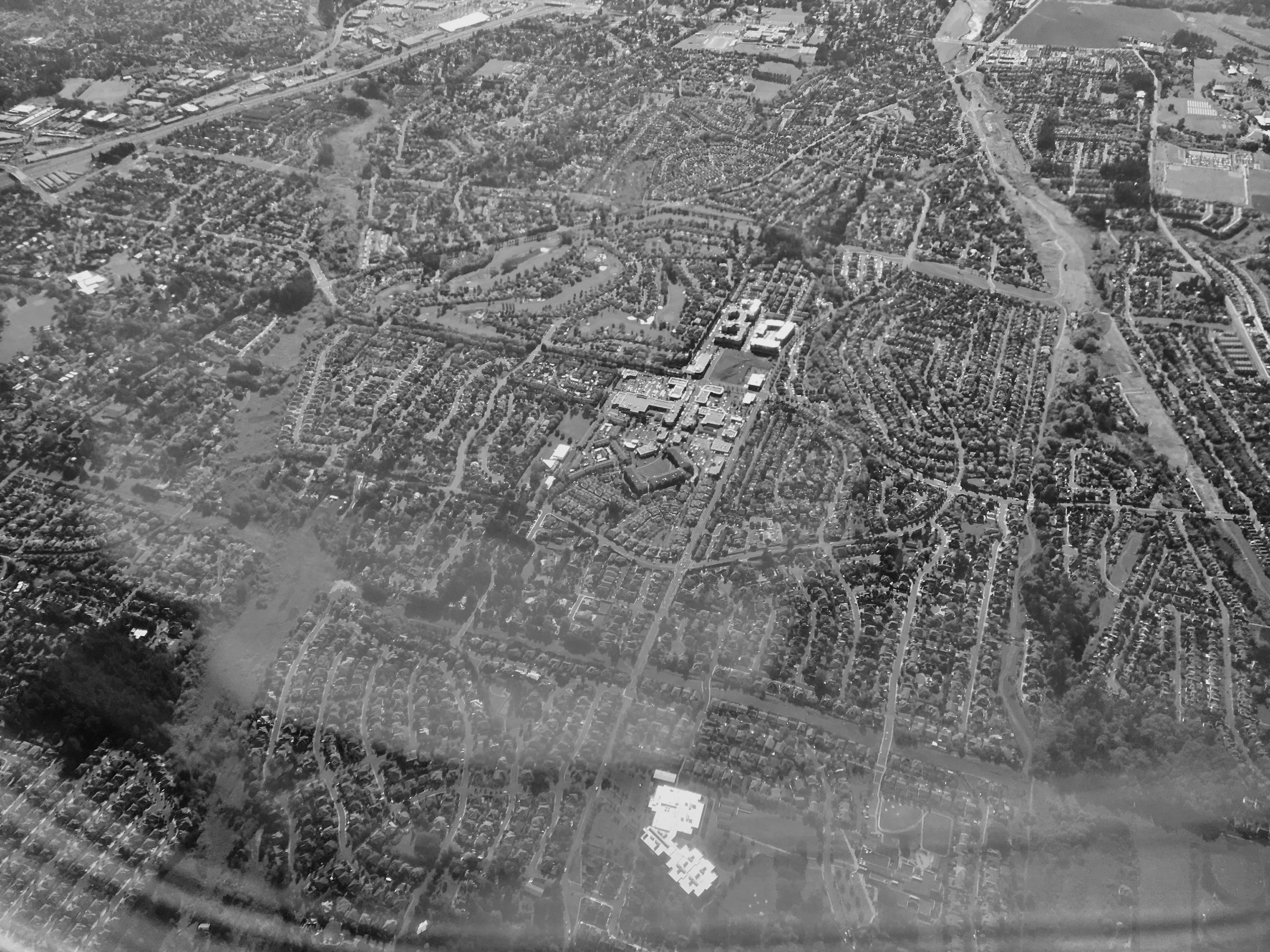
- Aerial view of Bethany and surrounding area

- Location within the state of Oregon Bethany (the United States)
- Coordinates: 45°33′41″N 122°50′13″W
- Country: United States
- State: Oregon
- County: Washington
- Elevation: 266 ft (81 m)

Population (2020)
  - Total: 31,350
- Time zone: UTC-8 (Pacific (PST))
  - Summer (DST): UTC-7 (PDT)
- ZIP codes: 97006, 97229
- Area codes: 503, 971
- GNIS feature ID: 2584406

Bethany is an unincorporated community and census-designated place in Washington County, Oregon, United States. It is situated north of U.S. Route 26 and Oak Hills, near Beaverton, approximately four miles northwest of Cedar Mill, and is within the Portland metropolitan area. As of the 2020 census, Bethany had a population of 31,350.

== History ==
The name Bethany was first applied to a crossroads trading center about two miles northeast of the current location, where a Presbyterian church stands today. The area was first settled by Ulrich Gerber, who came from Switzerland in the mid-1870s. Gerber helped establish the first post office in the area in 1878, about a mile east of the current Bethany School, and suggested the name Bethany. "Bethany" is a Hebrew word, originally applied to a place in Palestine near Jerusalem, and used as a place name all over the United States, especially in connection with a church. The post office was discontinued in 1904. The area's first public library was opened in July 2007 by a non-profit organization named the Cedar Mill Community Library Association, which has operated a library in nearby Cedar Mill since 1976. It is considered a branch of that library and is named the Cedar Mill Community Library @ Bethany.

== Demographics ==
=== 2020 census ===
As of the 2020 census, Bethany had a population of 31,350. The median age was 36.9 years. 30.0% of residents were under the age of 18 and 10.3% of residents were 65 years of age or older. For every 100 females there were 94.7 males, and for every 100 females age 18 and over there were 92.0 males age 18 and over.

99.9% of residents lived in urban areas, while 0.1% lived in rural areas.

There were 10,719 households in Bethany, of which 50.3% had children under the age of 18 living in them. Of all households, 67.7% were married-couple households, 10.0% were households with a male householder and no spouse or partner present, and 18.5% were households with a female householder and no spouse or partner present. About 17.2% of all households were made up of individuals and 7.1% had someone living alone who was 65 years of age or older.

There were 11,159 housing units, of which 3.9% were vacant. The homeowner vacancy rate was 1.5% and the rental vacancy rate was 4.8%.

Racial composition as of the 2020 census
Race	Number	Percent
White	13,090	41.8%
Black or African American	662	2.1%
American Indian and Alaska Native	121	0.4%
Asian	13,918	44.4%
Native Hawaiian and Other Pacific Islander	64	0.2%
Some other race	778	2.5%
Two or more races	2,717	8.7%
Hispanic or Latino (of any race)	2,223	7.1%

=== 2010 Census ===
As of the census of 2010, there were 20,646 people, 7,205 households, and 5,579 families residing in Bethany. The racial makeup of Bethany was 60.4% White, 31.7% Asian, 1.7% Black, 0.2% Pacific Islander, 1.5% from other races, and 4.1% from two or more races. Hispanic or Latino of any race were 5.1% of the population.

There were 5,579 family households, of which 50.6% had children under the age of 18 living with them, 66.4% were married couples living together, 8.4% had a female householder with no husband present, 2.6% had a male householder with no wife present, and 22.6% were non-families. 18.6% of all households were made up of individuals, and 6.6% had someone living alone who was 65 years of age or older. The average household size was 2.86 and the average family size was 3.30.

The median age in Bethany was 35.7 years. The gender makeup of the area was 48.5% male and 51.5% female.
