= 2010 Oregon State Treasurer special election =

- November 2, 2010
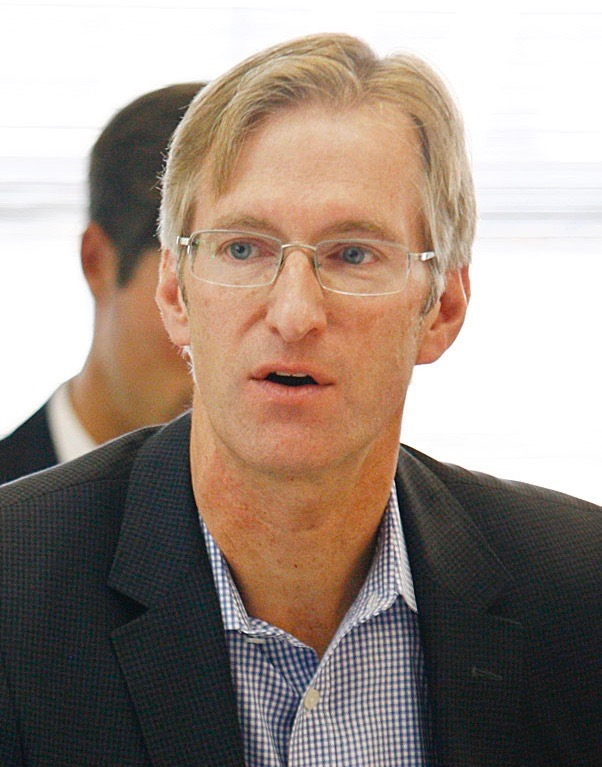

Candidate	Ted Wheeler	Chris Telfer
Party	Democratic	Republican
Popular vote	721,795	571,105
Percentage	52.93%	41.88%
- County results Wheeler: 50–60% 70–80% Telfer: 40–50% 50–60% 60–70% 70–80%
State Treasurer before election
Ted Wheeler
Democratic
Elected State Treasurer
Ted Wheeler
Democratic

The 2010 Oregon State Treasurer special election was held on November 2, 2010, to elect the Oregon State Treasurer.

This election determined who would fill the remaining two years of the term of Ben Westlund, who died in office from lung cancer earlier in the year. Incumbent Democratic State Treasurer Ted Wheeler, who was appointed by Governor Ted Kulongoski to serve until this special election could be held, ran for election to the office. In primary elections held on May 18, Wheeler captured the Democratic nomination, and the Republicans picked State Senator Chris Telfer.

Wheeler won the election, defeating Telfer and two third-party candidates handily.

== Democratic primary ==
Oregon State Treasurer Democratic primary, 2010
Party	Candidate	Votes	%
Democratic	Ted Wheeler	216,214	64.91
Democratic	Rick Metsger	114,597	34.40
Democratic	Write-ins	2,273	0.68
Total votes		273,643	100

== Republican primary ==
Oregon State Treasurer Republican primary, 2010
Party	Candidate	Votes	%
Republican	Chris Telfer	214,318	98.67
Republican	Write-ins	2,875	1.32
Total votes		273,643	100

== Results ==
Oregon State Treasurer special election, 2010
Party	Candidate	Votes	%	±%
Democratic	Ted Wheeler (incumbent)	721,795	52.93%	
Republican	Chris Telfer	571,105	41.88%	
Progressive	Walter F. "Walt" Brown	38,316	2.81%	
Constitution	Michael Marsh	30,489	2.23%	
Write-in		1,738	0.12%	
Total votes		1,363,443	100.00%	
Democratic hold				
