= 2020 Oregon State Treasurer election =

- November 3, 2020
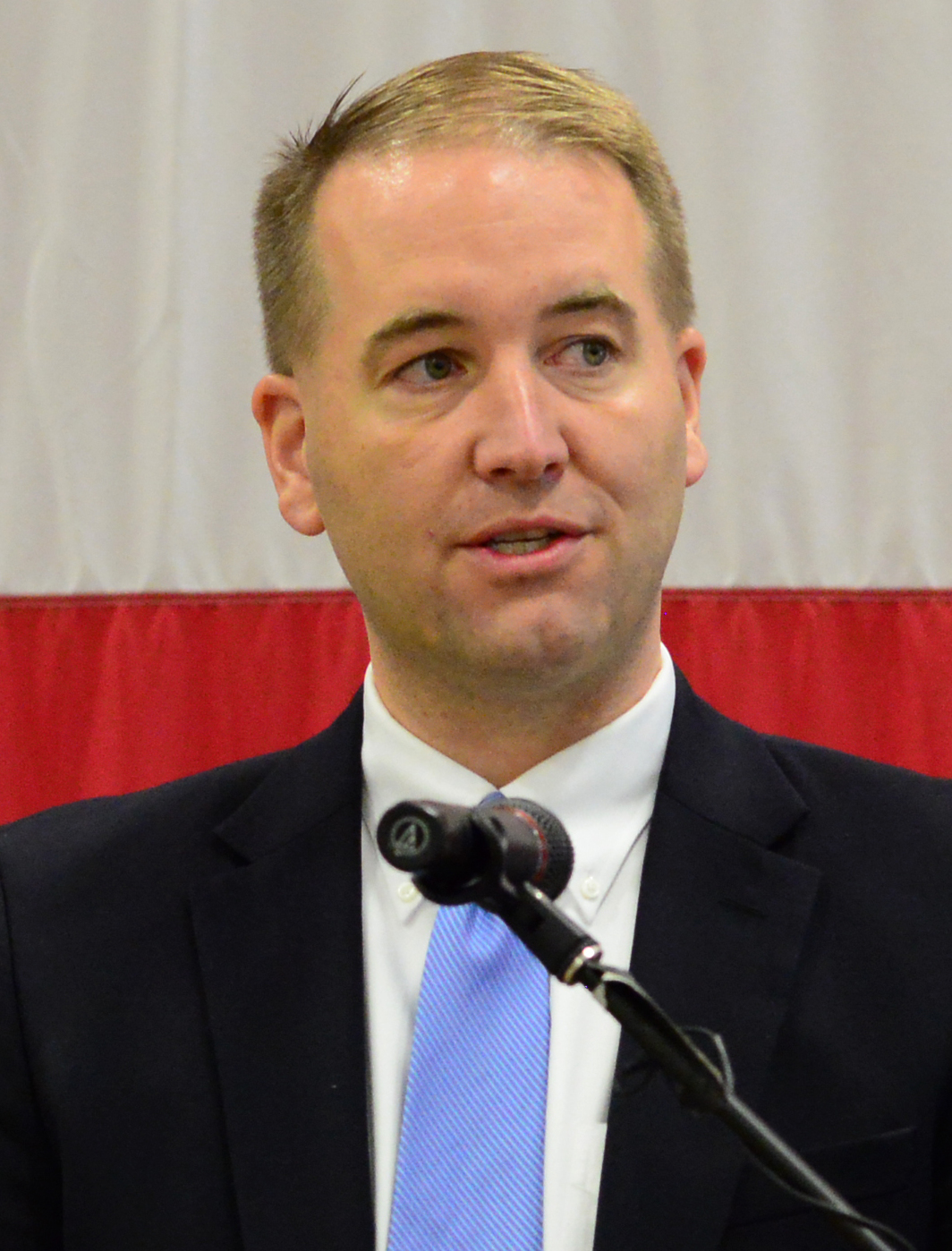

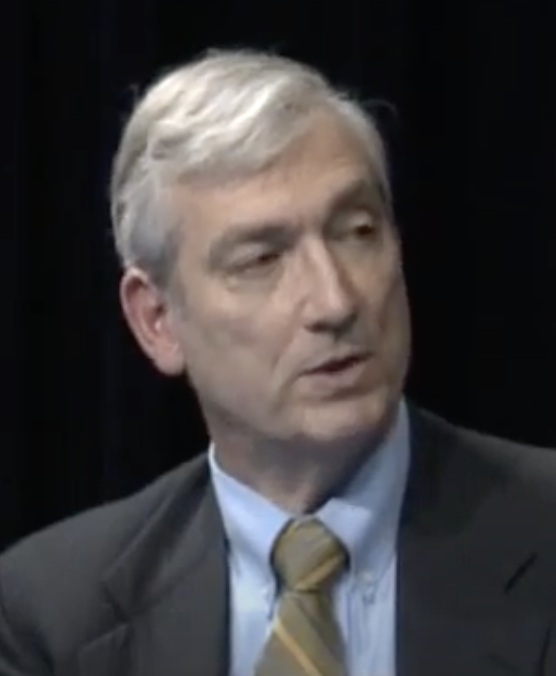
Candidate	Tobias Read	Jeff Gudman
Party	Democratic	Republican
Popular vote	1,166,703	936,916
Percentage	51.68%	41.50%
- Read: 40–50% 50–60% 60–70% 70–80% 80–90% >90% Gudman: 40–50% 50–60% 60–70% 70–80% 80–90% >90% Tie: 40–50% 50% No data
State Treasurer before election
Tobias Read
Democratic
Elected State Treasurer
Tobias Read
Democratic

The 2020 Oregon State Treasurer election was held on November 3, 2020, to elect the Oregon State Treasurer. Incumbent Democratic State Treasurer Tobias Read, first elected in 2016, was reelected to a second term in office.

== Democratic primary ==
=== Candidates ===
==== Declared ====
- Tobias Read, incumbent State Treasurer

=== Results ===
Democratic primary results
Party	Candidate	Votes	%
Democratic	Tobias Read (incumbent)	464,429	98.73%
Write-in		5,956	1.27%
Total votes		470,385	100.0%

== Republican primary ==
=== Candidates ===
==== Declared ====
- Jeff Gudman, former Lake Oswego city councilor

=== Results ===
Republican primary results
Party	Candidate	Votes	%
Republican	Jeff Gudman	305,589	98.96%
Write-in		3,223	1.04%
Total votes		308,812	100.0%

== General election ==
=== Endorsements ===
Tobias Read

Labor unions

- AFSCME Local 2831

Newspapers

- The Oregonian

=== Debate ===
2020 Oregon State Treasurer election debate
No.	Date	Host	Moderator	Link	Democratic	Republican
Key: P Participant A Absent N Not invited I Invited W Withdrawn						
Key: P Participant A Absent N Not invited I Invited W Withdrawn					Tobias Read	Jeff Gudman
1	Oct. 21, 2020	City Club of Portland	John Schrag	YouTube	P	P

=== Results ===
2020 Oregon State Treasurer election
Party	Candidate	Votes	%	±%
Democratic	Tobias Read (incumbent)	1,166,703	51.68%	+7.57%
Republican	Jeff Gudman	936,916	41.50%	+0.15%
Independent Party	Chris Henry	99,870	4.42%	−4.99%
Constitution	Michael Marsh	51,894	2.30%	N/A
Write-in		2,072	0.09%	–0.10%
Total votes		2,257,455	100.00%	N/A
Democratic hold				

==== By county ====
County	Tobias Read Democratic		Jeff Gudman Republican		Various candidates Other parties		Margin		Total
County	#	%	#	%	#	%	#	%	Total
Baker	2,123	22.26%	6,721	70.47%	693	7.27%	-4,598	-48.21%	9,537
Benton	31,041	61.23%	15,966	31.49%	3,688	7.27%	15,075	29.74%	50,695
Clackamas	116,830	47.97%	111,650	45.84%	15,091	6.20%	5,180	2.13%	243,571
Clatsop	11,640	50.66%	9,725	42.33%	1,610	7.01%	1,915	8.34%	22,975
Columbia	12,597	40.70%	15,807	51.07%	2,545	8.22%	-3,210	-10.37%	30,949
Coos	13,130	37.18%	19,669	55.70%	2,513	7.12%	-6,539	-18.52%	35,312
Crook	3,495	23.46%	10,518	70.61%	883	5.93%	-7,023	-47.15%	14,896
Curry	5,477	38.35%	7,913	55.40%	893	6.25%	-2,436	-17.06%	14,283
Deschutes	55,708	46.68%	55,786	46.75%	7,841	6.57%	-78	-0.07%	119,335
Douglas	17,877	29.12%	39,365	64.13%	4,145	6.75%	-21,488	-35.00%	61,387
Gilliam	297	26.12%	757	66.58%	83	7.30%	-460	-40.46%	1,137
Grant	866	19.62%	3,247	73.58%	300	6.80%	-2,381	-53.95%	4,413
Harney	862	20.05%	3,146	73.18%	291	6.77%	-2,284	-53.13%	4,299
Hood River	7,720	61.81%	4,072	32.60%	697	5.58%	3,648	29.21%	12,489
Jackson	52,283	43.14%	60,669	50.06%	8,236	6.80%	-8,386	-6.92%	121,188
Jefferson	3,990	34.70%	6,687	58.16%	820	7.13%	-2,697	-23.46%	11,497
Josephine	16,175	33.05%	28,832	58.91%	3,936	8.04%	-12,657	-25.86%	48,943
Klamath	9,298	26.35%	23,326	66.10%	2,665	7.55%	-14,028	-39.75%	35,289
Lake	689	16.44%	3,244	77.42%	257	6.13%	-2,555	-60.98%	4,190
Lane	117,660	56.10%	77,130	36.78%	14,944	7.13%	40,530	19.32%	209,734
Lincoln	15,731	53.17%	11,639	39.34%	2,217	7.49%	4,092	13.83%	29,587
Linn	23,690	34.42%	40,157	58.35%	4,979	7.23%	-16,467	-23.93%	68,826
Malheur	2,949	25.72%	7,689	67.05%	830	7.24%	-4,740	-41.33%	11,468
Marion	72,314	45.59%	75,490	47.59%	10,827	6.83%	-3,176	-2.00%	158,631
Morrow	1,285	26.05%	3,291	66.73%	356	7.22%	-2,006	-40.67%	4,932
Multnomah	319,752	72.81%	89,221	20.32%	30,173	6.87%	230,531	52.50%	439,146
Polk	20,434	43.88%	23,040	49.47%	3,099	6.65%	-2,606	-5.60%	46,573
Sherman	245	21.18%	855	73.90%	57	4.93%	-610	-52.72%	1,157
Tillamook	7,381	45.61%	7,722	47.72%	1,079	6.67%	-341	-2.11%	16,182
Umatilla	9,587	30.42%	19,672	62.43%	2,253	7.15%	-10,085	-32.00%	31,512
Union	3,883	27.22%	9,469	66.38%	913	6.40%	-5,586	-39.16%	14,265
Wallowa	1,404	28.36%	3,250	65.64%	297	6.00%	-1,846	-37.29%	4,951
Wasco	5,984	44.33%	6,600	48.90%	914	6.77%	-616	-4.56%	13,498
Washington	178,555	58.73%	105,928	34.84%	19,523	6.42%	72,627	23.89%	304,006
Wheeler	217	23.61%	635	69.10%	67	7.29%	-418	-45.48%	919
Yamhill	23,534	42.26%	28,028	50.33%	4,121	7.40%	-4,494	-8.07%	55,683
Totals	1,166,703	51.68%	936,916	41.50%	153,836	6.81%	229,787	10.18%	2,257,455

Counties that flipped from Republican to Democratic

- Clackamas (largest city: Lake Oswego)

==== By congressional district ====
Read won four of five congressional districts.

District	Read	Gudman	Representative
1st	57%	37%	Suzanne Bonamici
2nd	38%	55%	Cliff Bentz
3rd	68%	25%	Earl Blumenauer
4th	47%	46%	Peter DeFazio
5th	48%	45%	Kurt Schrader
