= 2016 Oregon Secretary of State election =

- November 8, 2016
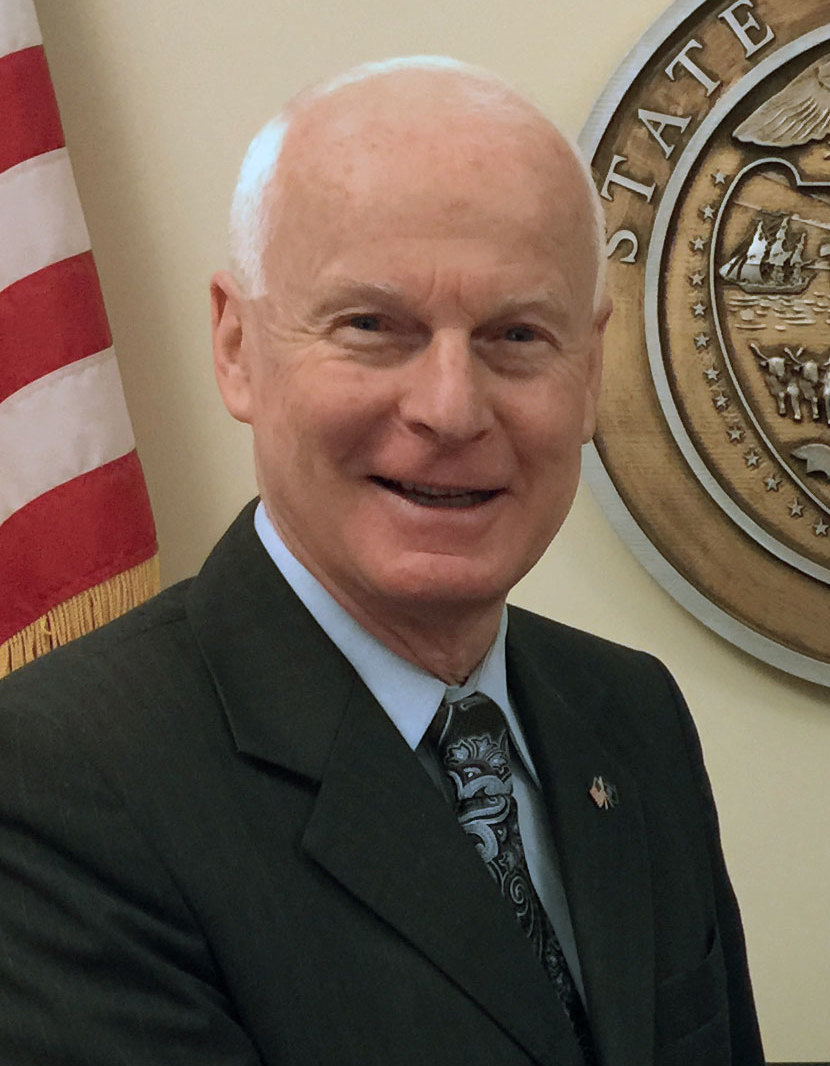

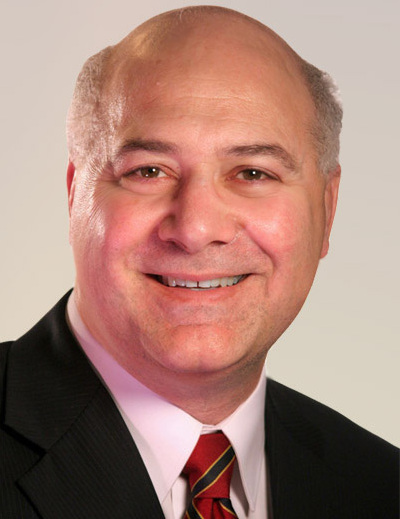
Nominee	Dennis Richardson	Brad Avakian
Party	Republican	Democratic
Popular vote	892,669	814,089
Percentage	47.38%	43.21%
- Richardson: 40–50% 50–60% 60–70% 70–80% 80–90% >90% Avakian: 40–50% 50–60% 60–70% 70–80% 80–90% >90% Tie: 40–50% No data
Secretary of State before election
Jeanne Atkins
Democratic
Elected Secretary of State
Dennis Richardson
Republican

The 2016 Oregon Secretary of State election was held on November 8, 2016, to elect the Oregon Secretary of State. Incumbent Democratic Secretary of State Jeanne Atkins declined to seek election; she was appointed in March 2015 following Kate Brown's ascension to the governorship.

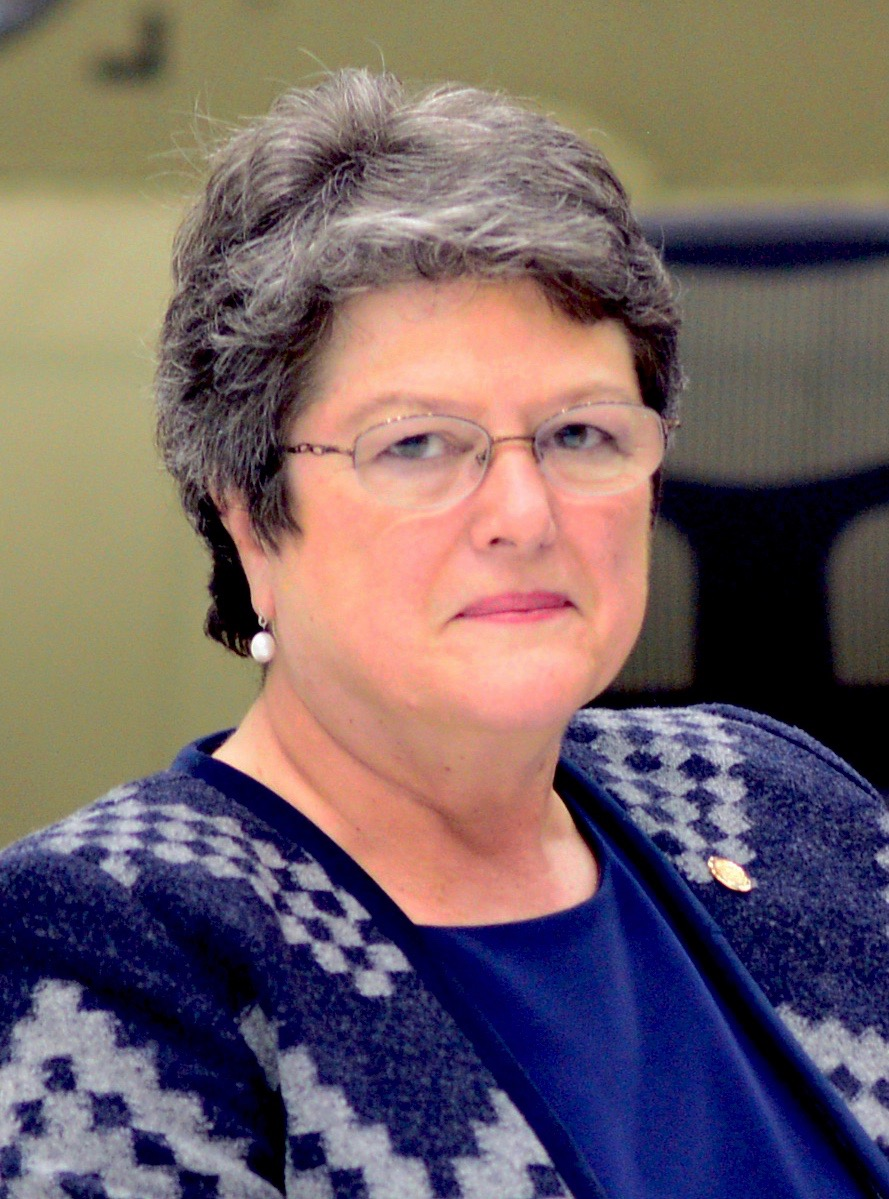
The incumbent in 2016, Jeanne Atkins. Her term expired on January 2, 2017.

Republican Dennis Richardson defeated Democrat Brad Avakian to become the first Republican elected to statewide office in Oregon since 2002, and the first to hold this office since 1985. As of 2026, this remains the last statewide election in Oregon won by a Republican.

== Democratic primary ==
=== Candidates ===
- Brad Avakian, Oregon Commissioner of Labor and Industries, former state senator and state representative candidate for 2012 Oregon's 1st congressional district special election
- Richard Devlin, state senator and former state representative
- Val Hoyle, state representative

=== Results ===
Democratic primary results by county: Brad Avakian: 45–50% 40–45% 35–40% 30–35%; Val Hoyle: 55–60% 35–40% 30–35%; Devlin–Hoyle tie: 30–35%; Richard Devlin: 35–40% 30–35%

Democratic primary results
Party	Candidate	Votes	%
Democratic	Brad Avakian	204,135	38.88%
Democratic	Val Hoyle	178,829	34.06%
Democratic	Richard Devlin	137,612	26.21%
Write-in		4,462	0.85%
Total votes		511,627	100.0%

== Republican primary ==
=== Candidates ===
- Sid Leiken, Lane County commissioner
- Dennis Richardson, former state representative

=== Results ===
Republican primary results by county: Dennis Richardson: 85–90% 80–85% 75–80% 60–65%; Sid Leiken: 50–55%

Republican primary results
Party	Candidate	Votes	%
Republican	Dennis Richardson	269,790	77.95%
Republican	Sid Leiken	74,237	21.45%
Write-in		2,086	0.60%
Total votes		346,113	100.0%

== Independent Party primary ==
=== Nominee ===
- Paul Damian Wells, machinist and perennial candidate

=== Results ===
Independent Party primary results
Party	Candidate	Votes	%
Independent Party	Paul Damian Wells	17,124	64.94%
Write-in		9,245	35.06%
Total votes		26,369	100.0%

== Other candidates ==
- Sharon Durbin (Libertarian), candidate for U.S. House District 2 in 2014
- Michael P. Marsh (Constitution), perennial candidate
- Alan Zundel (Pacific Green), former political scientist and former professor at the University of Nevada, Las Vegas

== General election ==
=== Endorsements ===
Dennis Richardson (R)

Elected officials

- Betsy Johnson, State Senator (D)
- Brad Witt, State Representative (D)
- Philip D. Lang, former Speaker of the House (D)

Newspapers

- Statesman Journal
- The Oregonian
- News-Register
- The Register-Guard
- East Oregonian
- Willamette Week
- The Daily Astorian
- The Bulletin
- Portland Tribune
- Mail Tribune

=== Polling ===
Poll source	Date(s) administered	Sample size (Note: Key: A – all adults; RV – registered voters; LV – likely voters; V – unclear)	Margin of error	Brad Avakian (D)	Dennis Richardson (R)	Paul Wells (I)	Sharon Durbin (L)	Other	Undecided
DHM Research (Note: Poll sponsored by Fox 12)	October 25–29, 2016	504 (LV)	± 4.4%	27%	32%	3%	3%	7% (Note: Marsh (C), Zundel (PG) with 1%; "Somebody else/ May skip race" with 5%)	28%
DHM Research	October 6–13, 2016	600 (LV)	± 4.0%	29%	34%	4%	3%	5% (Note: Marsh (C) with 3%; Zundel (PG) with 2%)	24%
iCitizen	September 2–7, 2016	610 (RV)	± 4.0%	29%	26%	4%	2%	3% (Note: Zundel (PG) with 2%; Marsh (C) with 1%)	36%
Clout Research (R)	July 9–13, 2016	701 (LV)	± 3.7%	34%	43%	–	–	10%	12%

=== Results ===
2016 Oregon Secretary of State election
Party	Candidate	Votes	%	±%
Republican	Dennis Richardson	892,669	47.38%	+4.18%
Democratic	Brad Avakian	814,089	43.21%	–8.07%
Independent Party	Paul Damian Wells	64,956	3.45%	N/A
Pacific Green	Alan Zundel	47,576	2.52%	–0.11%
Libertarian	Sharon Durbin	46,975	2.49%	+1.05%
Constitution	Michael Marsh	15,269	0.81%	+0.29%
Write-in		2,646	0.14%	-0.01%
Total votes		1,884,180	100.0%	
Republican gain from Democratic				
