= Oregon's 27th House district =

Legislative districts in the state of Oregon

Oregon's 27th House district after redistricting after the 2020 Census

District 27 of the Oregon House of Representatives is one of 60 House legislative districts in the state of Oregon. As of 2021, the district is contained entirely within Washington County and includes most of Beaverton. The current representative for the district is Democrat Ken Helm of Beaverton.

== Election results ==
District boundaries have changed over time. Therefore, representatives before 2021 may not represent the same constituency as today. General election results from 2000 to present are as follows:

Year	Candidate	Party	Percent	Opponent	Party	Percent	Opponent	Party	Percent	Write-in percentage
2000	Jerry Krummel	Republican	57.22%	Jill Thorn	Democratic	42.78%	No third candidate			
2002 (Note: Mark Hass was the incumbent in this election. He previously represented District 8, but was moved to this district due to redistricting following the 2000 United States census.)	Mark Hass	Democratic	99.43%	Unopposed						0.57%
2004	Mark Hass	Democratic	66.41%	Gabe Schomus	Republican	30.45%	Christi Feldewerth	Libertarian	3.14%	
2006	Tobias Read	Democratic	59.50%	Domonic Biggi	Republican	40.32%	No third candidate			0.18%
2008	Tobias Read	Democratic	70.25%	Michael DiVietro	Republican	29.44%	No third candidate			0.31%
2010	Tobias Read	Democratic	62.23%	Dan Lucas	Republican	37.64%	No third candidate			0.14%
2012	Tobias Read	Democratic	67.86%	Burton Keeble	Republican	31.86%	No third candidate			0.29%
2014	Tobias Read	Democratic	80.83%	Robert Martin	Libertarian	18.20%	No third candidate			0.97%
2016	Sheri Malstrom	Democratic	97.83%	Unopposed						2.17%
2018 (Note: Sheri Malstrom was married on July 7, 2018 and her name changed to Sheri Schouten prior to the general election on November 6, 2018. However, she appeared under her previous name of Sheri Malstrom on the election ballot.)	Sheri Malstrom	Democratic	66.28%	Brian Pierson	Independent	30.58%	Katy Brumbelow	Libertarian	3.02%	0.12%
2020	Sheri Schouten	Democratic	69.31%	Sandra Nelson	Republican	30.55%	No third candidate			0.14%
2022	Ken Helm (Note: Ken Helm was the incumbent in this election. He previously represented District 34, but was moved to this district due to redistricting following the 2020 United States census.)	Democratic	71.21%	Sandra Nelson	Republican	28.67%	No third candidate			0.12%
2024	Ken Helm	Democratic	74.0%	Victoria Kingsbury	Republican	25.9%	No third candidate			0.1%

== See also ==
- Oregon Legislative Assembly
- Oregon House of Representatives
