= 2016 Oregon State Treasurer election =

- November 8, 2016
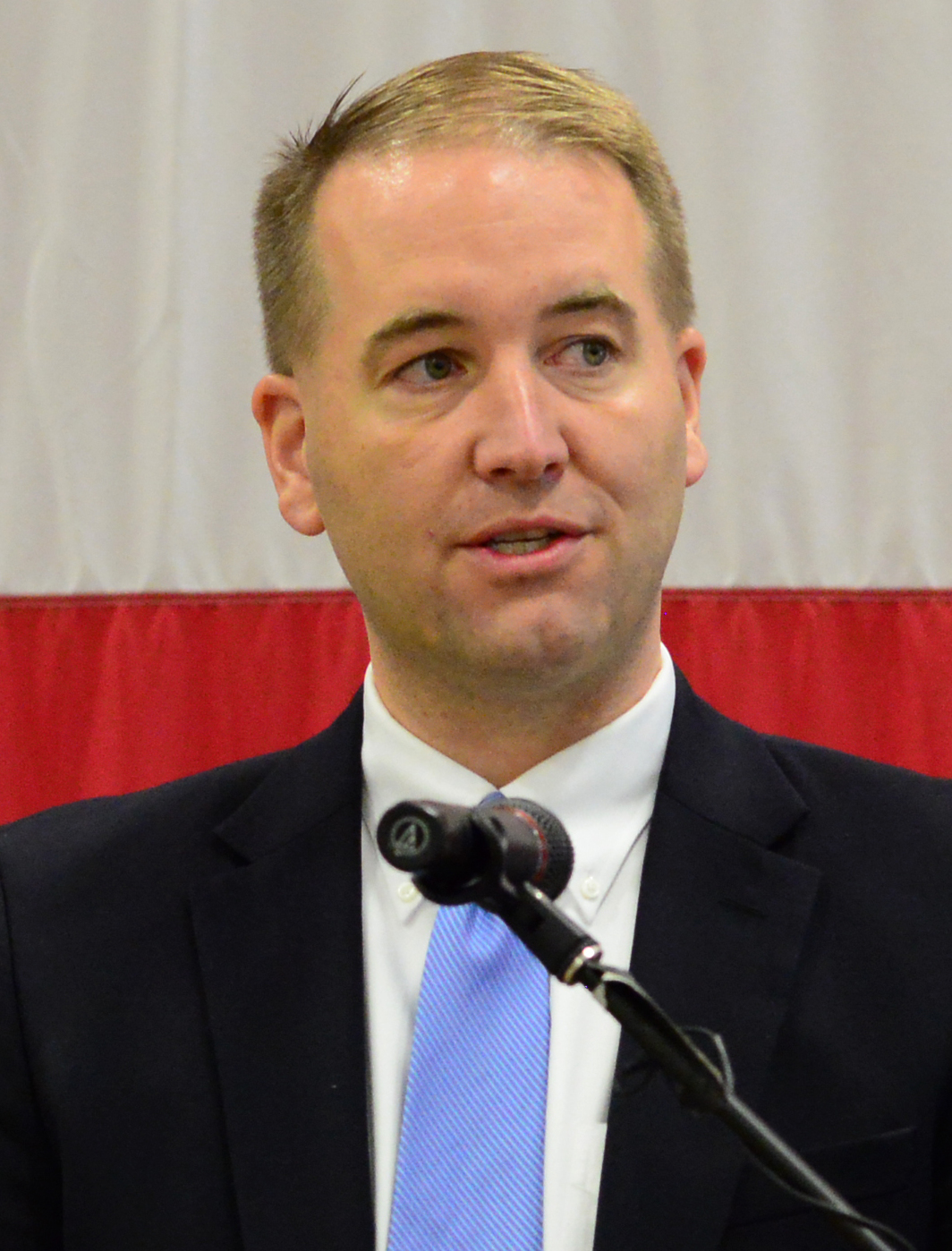

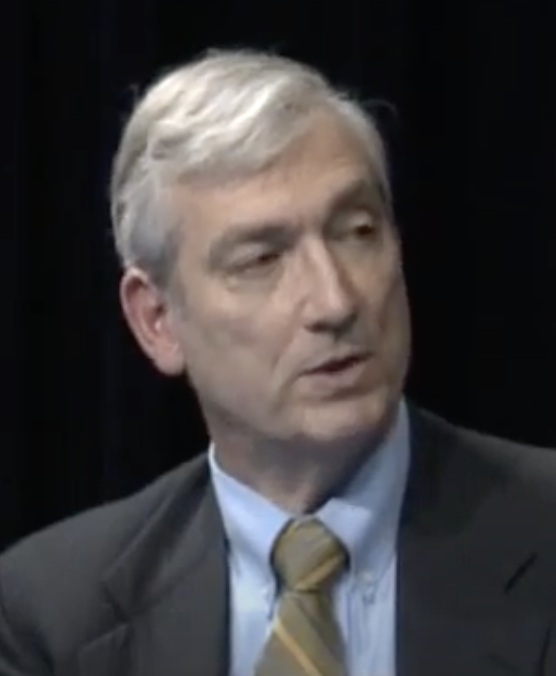

Candidate	Tobias Read	Jeff Gudman	Chris Telfer
Party	Democratic	Republican	Independent Party
Popular vote	828,354	776,513	176,892
Percentage	44.11%	41.35%	9.42%
- Read: 30–40% 40–50% 50–60% 60–70% 70–80% 80–90% Gudman: 30–40% 40–50% 50–60% 60–70% 70–80% 80–90% >90% Tie: 40–50% No data
State Treasurer before election
Ted Wheeler
Democratic
Elected State Treasurer
Tobias Read
Democratic

The 2016 Oregon State Treasurer election was held on November 8, 2016, to elect the Oregon State Treasurer. Incumbent Democratic state treasurer Ted Wheeler is term-limited and successfully ran for mayor of Portland. Democrat Tobias Read was elected with 44.1% of the vote to succeed him.

== Democratic primary ==
=== Candidates ===
==== Nominee ====
- Tobias Read, state representative

=== Results ===
Democratic primary results
Party	Candidate	Votes	%
Democratic	Tobias Read	394,815	98.37
Democratic	Write-ins	6,536	1.63
Total votes		401,351	100

== Republican primary ==
=== Candidates ===
==== Nominee ====
- Jeff Gudman, Lake Oswego City Councilor

=== Results ===
Republican primary results
Party	Candidate	Votes	%
Republican	Jeff Gudman	245,986	98.55
Republican	Write-ins	3,608	1.45
Total votes		249,594	100

== Independent Party primary ==
=== Candidates ===
==== Nominee ====
- Chris Telfer, former state senator

=== Results ===
Oregon State Treasurer Independent primary, 2016
Party	Candidate	Votes	%
Independent Party	Chris Telfer	19,708	80.67
Independent Party	Write-ins	4,721	19.33
Total votes		24,429	100

== General election ==
=== Polling ===
Poll source	Date(s) administered	Sample size	Margin of error	Tobias Read (D)	Jeff Gudman (R)	Chris Telfer (I)	Undecided
iCitizen	September 2–7, 2016	610	± 4.0%	25%	18%	9%	48%

=== Results ===
Oregon State Treasurer election, November 8, 2016
Party	Candidate	Votes	%
Democratic	Tobias Read	828,354	44.11%
Republican	Jeff Gudman	776,513	41.35%
Independent Party	Chris Telfer	176,892	9.42%
Progressive	Chris Henry	92,663	4.93%
	Write-ins	3,497	0.19%
Total votes		1,877,919	100%
