= Sheri Schouten =

Member of the Oregon House of Representatives

Member of the Oregon House of Representatives from the 27th district
- In office January 9, 2017 – January 9, 2023
- Preceded by: Tobias Read
- Succeeded by: Ken Helm

Personal details
- Party: Democratic
- Spouse: Dick Schouten
- Children: 3
- Education: Oregon Health & Science University

Sheri Schouten, formerly Sheri Malstrom, is an American Democratic politician and former nurse who served in the Oregon House of Representatives. She represented District 27, which covers parts of Washington County and Multnomah County, including central and southern Beaverton, Garden Home–Whitford, Raleigh Hills, and a small part of western Portland.

== Biography ==
Schouten graduated from Oregon Health & Science University in 1981, and worked as a registered nurse until 2016.

In 2016, she was elected to the House to succeed Tobias Read, who retired in order to successfully run for Oregon State Treasurer. She ran unopposed for the seat and received 98% of the vote. In 2018, she was nominated for a second term and faced Independent Party of Oregon nominee Brian Pierson and Libertarian Katy Brumbelow in the November general election. She received 66% of the vote.

== Personal life ==
Schouten was married and widowed with three children prior to seeking political office. In 2017, Washington County Commissioner Dick Schouten proposed to her on the floor of the Oregon Legislature. They were married on July 7, 2018, by Oregon Governor Kate Brown at the historic Belle Ainsworth Jenkins Estate in Aloha.
