= Tobias Read =

American politician (born 1975)

- Read in 2026

30th Secretary of State of Oregon
- Incumbent
- Assumed office January 6, 2025
- Governor: Tina Kotek
- Preceded by: LaVonne Griffin-Valade

29th Treasurer of Oregon
- In office January 3, 2017 – January 6, 2025
- Governor: Kate Brown; Tina Kotek
- Preceded by: Ted Wheeler
- Succeeded by: Elizabeth Steiner

Member of the Oregon House of Representatives from the 27th district
- In office January 8, 2007 – January 3, 2017
- Preceded by: Mark Hass
- Succeeded by: Sheri Malstrom

Personal details
- Born: July 1, 1975 (age 51) Missoula, Montana, U.S.
- Party: Democratic
- Spouse: Heidi Eggert
- Children: 2
- Education: Willamette University (BA); University of Washington (MBA)
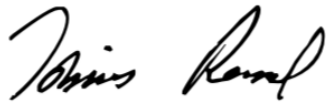
- Signature

Tobias Read (born July 1, 1975) is an American politician who is currently serving as the 30th Oregon Secretary of State since 2025. As a member of the Democratic Party he served as the 29th Oregon State Treasurer from 2017 to 2025. Before that, he was a member of the Oregon House of Representatives, representing the 27th district from 2007 to 2017, which comprised parts of Beaverton, southwest Portland, and unincorporated Multnomah and Washington Counties. He served as Speaker Pro Tempore and was formerly the Democratic Majority Whip.

In 2016, Read ran for Oregon State Treasurer, to succeed State Treasurer Ted Wheeler, who was barred from running in 2016 by term limits. Read won the general election against Republican Jeff Gudman on November 8, 2016 and became the state treasurer in January 2017. He was reelected in 2020 by a wider margin. He was a candidate for governor of Oregon in the 2022 election, losing to Tina Kotek in the Democratic primary.

In 2023, Read announced his candidacy for Secretary of State after an ethics violation led to the resignation of Shemia Fagan. He beat James Manning Jr., a State Senator from Eugene, in the primary election, and Dennis Linthicum, a State Senator from Klamath Falls, in the general election.

== Early life and education ==
Read was born in 1975 in Missoula, Montana. After growing up in Boise, Idaho, he moved to Oregon where he graduated from Willamette University in 1997 with a bachelor's degree in politics and economics. While at Willamette, Read was a member of the rowing team. It was there that he also met lifelong friend Dmitri Palmateer, who now serves as his chief of staff. In 2003, Read earned an MBA from the University of Washington in Seattle.

== Early career ==
From 1999 to 2001, Read worked for the United States Department of the Treasury as an aide to then-Secretary Lawrence Summers. His immediate supervisor was Sheryl Sandberg. Read then returned to Oregon after graduate school, working for startup SkyTaxi for several months before finding work at Nike as a footwear developer, where he worked from 2004 to 2012. In 2012, he left his role at Nike to focus full-time on his political career.

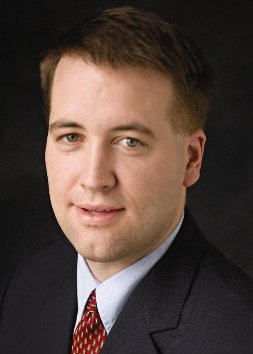
Read in 2012, while serving as a state legislator.

== State Representative (2007 – 2016) ==
Read served in the Oregon State Legislature from 2007 to 2016 as the representative from the 27th district.

=== Tenure ===
As a legislator, Read was a strong advocate for fully funding Oregon's full-day kindergarten; supported state investments in green tech jobs and research through Oregon InC and other initiatives; worked to stabilize state funding and enhance the state's Rainy Day funds; and sponsored legislation to redirect unclaimed funds from class action lawsuits to legal assistance for low income Oregonians; rather than back to the original corporate wrongdoers. Throughout his legislative career, he sought to expand savings in Oregon's college savings program, and sponsored legislation to create additional options for retirement savings for Oregonians.

During his time in the Oregon House, Read served as House Majority Whip, and in 2015 he was elected Speaker Pro Tempore. He served as chair of the House Committee on Transportation and Economic Development and the House Committee on Higher Education, Innovation, and Workforce Development. He also served on the House Revenue Committee and the Joint Committee on Ways and Means, the committee of the Legislature primarily responsible for writing the state budget.

== State Treasurer (2017 – 2025) ==
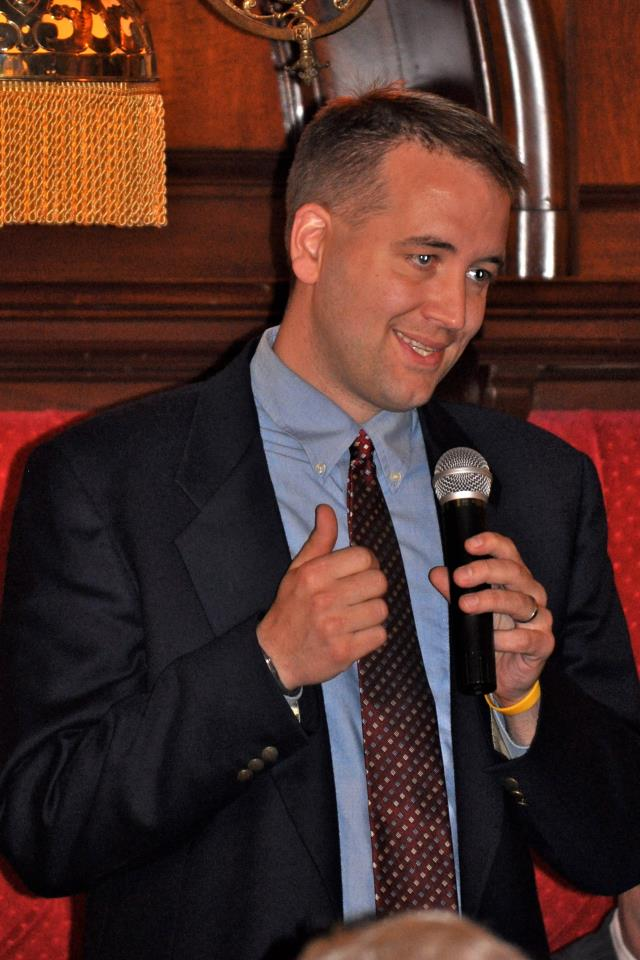
Read speaking as a state representative

In 2016, Read ran for Oregon State Treasurer, to succeed Ted Wheeler, who was barred by term limits from running again in 2016. He was unopposed in the primary and won the general election by a plurality in November 2016, defeating Republican Jeff Gudman, and became the state treasurer in January 2017.

Following the 2019 death Secretary of State Dennis Richardson, Read was first in the line of succession for the office of Governor until the 2020 election of Shemia Fagan. As Oregon does not have a lieutenant governor position, the Secretary of State is normally the first to succeed the governor in the event of a vacancy. However, as Richardson's successor Bev Clarno was an appointee, she was ineligible to become governor, making Read first in the line of succession.

Read ran for and won re-election as State Treasurer in 2020, facing Republican Jeff Gudman again in a rematch. This time, Read secured a decisive win, beating Gudman 51 to 41%. Later, Read again became first in the gubernatorial line of succession after Secretary of State Fagan resigned on May 8, 2023. He remained first in the line of succession when Governor Kotek appointed Secretary LaVonne Griffin-Valade.

=== First State-Sponsored Retirement Savings Plan ===
In 2015, in an effort led by Read and organizations such as SEIU and AARP, the Oregon Legislature enacted legislation which created the Oregon Retirement Savings Board and tasked it with establishing a state-run retirement savings program and managing its oversight. The retirement program created was called OregonSaves. In 2018, Finance industry publication Pensions & Investments and the Defined Contribution Institutional Investment Association (DCIIA) honored Read and OregonSaves with the Excellence & Innovation Award. The award recognizes public and private-sector efforts to enhance retirement security. In 2019 Read was invited to speak to the U.S. Senate Finance Committee on the states innovative approach to retirement savings.

=== Sale of Elliott State Forest ===
In 2017, Read voted to sell 82,500 acres of the Elliott State Forest to a Roseburg-based timber company for $221 million. Revenues from the sale would have been added to the state's education fund. Following pushback from environmentalist and other Oregon Democrats, Read withdrew his support for the proposal. Later in his tenure as State Treasurer, Read unveiled a proposal for the Elliott State Research Forest, an innovative solution to keep the forest in public hands and combat climate change.

=== Oregon College Savings Plan ===
As Treasurer, Read oversaw the Oregon College Savings Program (OCSP), which helps Oregonians save for education after high school.

Read worked with the Oregon State Legislature to pass the Education Savings Credit which changes the tax advantage from a deduction to a refundable credit. Begun in 2020, the Education Savings Credit makes it easier for low-to-moderate income families save for education after high school. Read worked with a diverse group of organizations including the Latina Network, Stand for Children, and the Oregon Student Association and legislators to pass the Education Savings Credit.

=== Net-Zero Plan ===
Early in 2024, Read announced his plan to move OPERF, Oregon's $100 billion pension plan, to carbon neutral by 2050. The 97-page document built a roadmap for Oregon to move Oregon away from high-risk investments in fossil fuels, and built in an intermediate goal of achieving a 60% reduction of emissions by 2035. The inaugural progress report was published on January 2, 2025.

== 2022 gubernatorial campaign ==
On September 27, 2021, Read officially announced that he was running for governor. More than a dozen candidates contended for the Democratic nomination, including New York Times journalist Nicholas Kristof and eventual winner, Oregon House Speaker Tina Kotek. In February 2022, Kristof was barred from running due to residency requirements, narrowing the field of leading candidates to Read and Kotek. While Read and Kotek shared many views, Read stressed the need to return to school once students received COVID vaccines and took a harder line on ensuring improved educational outcomes and moving homeless people off the streets and into shelters.

=== Results ===
Ultimately, Kotek topped Read 56 to 32%, with all other candidates receiving 2% or less.

== Oregon Secretary of State (2025 – present) ==
=== Campaign ===
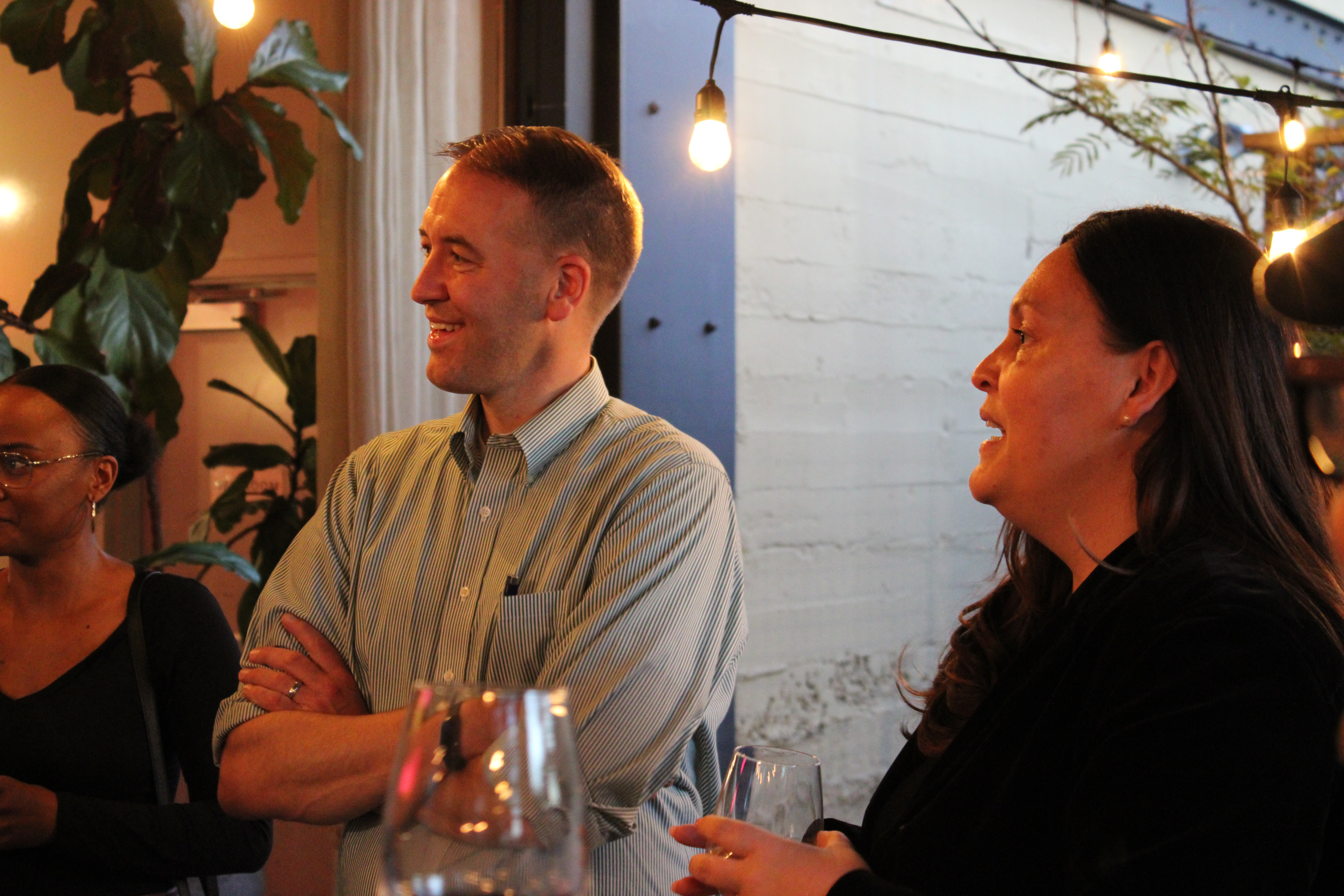
Read meets with supporters in Portland on the campaign trail, fall 2024.

Read announced his intention to run for Secretary of State in July 2023 and officially launched his campaign on September 13. He faced state senator James Manning in the Democratic primary and won with nearly 70% of the vote.

In the general election, Read faced Republican State Senator Dennis Linthicum of Klamath Falls. Read ran a campaign centered around rebuilding trust and integrity in the Secretary of State's office, which had faced years of turmoil and changing leadership. During the campaign, the Oregon Department of Transportation, which oversees the state's automatic voter registration system, announced that they had incorrectly registered more than 1,500 noncitizens to vote. Read and Linthicum both spoke out against the error, with Read declaring that "Oregonians deserve a thorough investigation of the automatic voter registration program's implementation, as well as accountability at both the Department of Motor Vehicles and the Secretary of State's Office."

==== Results ====
That November, Read won the general election with 54% to Linthicum's 42%.

=== Tenure ===
During his transition into the Secretary of State's office, Secretary-Elect Read recruited Dena Dawson, the Lane County clerk, to serve as Oregon's next Elections Director, following the abrupt departure of previous director Molly Woon. The following spring, Secretary Read announced on social media that he had begun traveling to each county in the state to meet with their county clerks and elections officials. He also removed a compromised state audit from the books which previous Secretary of State Shemia Fagan had issued while taking a lucrative consulting check from the audit's subject.

== Personal life ==
Read lives in Beaverton, Oregon with his wife Heidi Eggert and their two children, Annika and Ellis. He has devoted much of his free time to giving back to his community, including volunteering with Start Making a Reader Today (SMART), coaching youth sports, and serving as a founding board member of Hoopla, Oregon's largest three-on-three charity basketball tournament. Read is an avid basketball fan and has made several appearances on sports journalist John Canzano's podcast The Bald Faced Truth.

== Electoral history ==
=== Oregon House of Representatives ===
2006 Oregon State Representative, 27th district
Party	Candidate	Votes	%
Democratic	Tobias Read	14,325	59.5
Republican	Domonic Biggi	9,706	40.3
Write-in		43	0.2
Total votes		24,074	100%

2008 Oregon State Representative, 27th district
Party	Candidate	Votes	%
Democratic	Tobias Read	19,420	70.2
Republican	Michael F DeVietro	8,139	29.4
Write-in		86	0.3
Total votes		27,645	100%

2010 Oregon State Representative, 27th district
Party	Candidate	Votes	%
Democratic	Tobias Read	15,398	62.2
Republican	Dan Lucas	9,328	37.7
Write-in		34	0.1
Total votes		24,760	100%

2012 Oregon State Representative, 27th district
Party	Candidate	Votes	%
Democratic	Tobias Read	19,180	67.9
Republican	Burton Keeble	9,005	31.9
Write-in		81	0.3
Total votes		28,266	100%

2014 Oregon State Representative, 27th district
Party	Candidate	Votes	%
Democratic	Tobias Read	17,621	80.8
Libertarian	Robert D Martin	3,967	18.2
Write-in		211	1.0
Total votes		21,799	100%

=== Oregon State Treasurer ===
2016 results by county

2020 results by county

Oregon State Treasurer election, November 8, 2016
Party	Candidate	Votes	%
Democratic	Tobias Read	828,354	44.11%
Republican	Jeff Gudman	776,513	41.35%
Independent Party	Chris Telfer	176,892	9.42%
Progressive	Chris Henry	92,663	4.93%
	Write-ins	3,497	0.19%
Total votes		1,877,919	100%

2020 Oregon State Treasurer election
Party	Candidate	Votes	%	±%
Democratic	Tobias Read (incumbent)	1,166,703	51.68%	+7.57%
Republican	Jeff Gudman	936,916	41.50%	+0.15%
Independent Party	Chris Henry	99,870	4.43%	−4.99%
Constitution	Michael Marsh	51,894	2.30%	N/A
Write-in		2,072	0.09%	-0.10%
Total votes		2,257,455	100.0%	
Democratic hold				

=== Oregon Secretary of State ===
2024 results by county

2024 Oregon Secretary of State election
Party	Candidate	Votes	%
Democratic	Tobias Read	1,166,447	54.4
Republican	Dennis Linthicum	897,704	41.9
Pacific Green	Nathalie Paravicini	76,170	3.6
Write-in		2,011	0.1
Total votes		2,142,332	100%

Oregon House of Representatives
Preceded by Mark Hass	Member of the Oregon House of Representatives from the 27th district 2007–2017	Succeeded by Sheri Malstrom
Party political offices
Preceded by Ted Wheeler	Democratic nominee for Treasurer of Oregon; 2016, 2020	Succeeded by Elizabeth Steiner
Preceded by Shemia Fagan	Democratic nominee for Secretary of State of Oregon; 2024	Most recent
Political offices
Preceded by Ted Wheeler	Treasurer of Oregon; 2017–2025	Succeeded by Elizabeth Steiner
Preceded by LaVonne Griffin-Valade	Secretary of State of Oregon; 2025–present	Incumbent
