= Leslie Cummings =

American politician

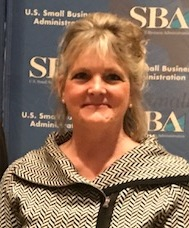
- Cummings in 2017

Acting Secretary of State of Oregon
- In office February 26, 2019 – March 31, 2019
- Governor: Kate Brown
- Preceded by: Dennis Richardson
- Succeeded by: Bev Clarno

Personal details
- Party: Republican

Leslie Cummings is an American government official who served as acting Oregon Secretary of State from February 26, 2019 to March 31, 2019.

== Personal life ==
Cummings is Christian. She has written two novels about horses, and co-owns a racehorse with her sister.

== Career ==
In 2012, Cummings worked as an IT Security Manager in the Oregon Employment Department. At the time, Cummings' husband, Bob Cummings, was working as an IT analyst for the Legislative Fiscal Office. Cummings' husband was later the subject of an ethics complaint. The Oregon Ethics Board found the complaint to be without merit. In 2013, Cummings accepted a position with Oregon Health Authority where she served in project management, enterprise architecture, and risk management. After Dennis Richardson was elected Oregon Secretary of State in 2016, he appointed Cummings to serve as deputy secretary of state. Dr. Cummings served as Deputy Secretary from January 2017 until Richardsons' death in 2019.

Cummings had previously assumed the duties of Secretary of State during Richardson's treatment for brain cancer. Cummings served in the position for one month after Richardson's death, after which politician Bev Clarno was selected to serve until the 2020 Oregon Secretary of State election. After Clarno took office, Cummings and other members of the Secretary of States's Executive Office were forced to resign.
