= Jeanne Atkins =

American politician

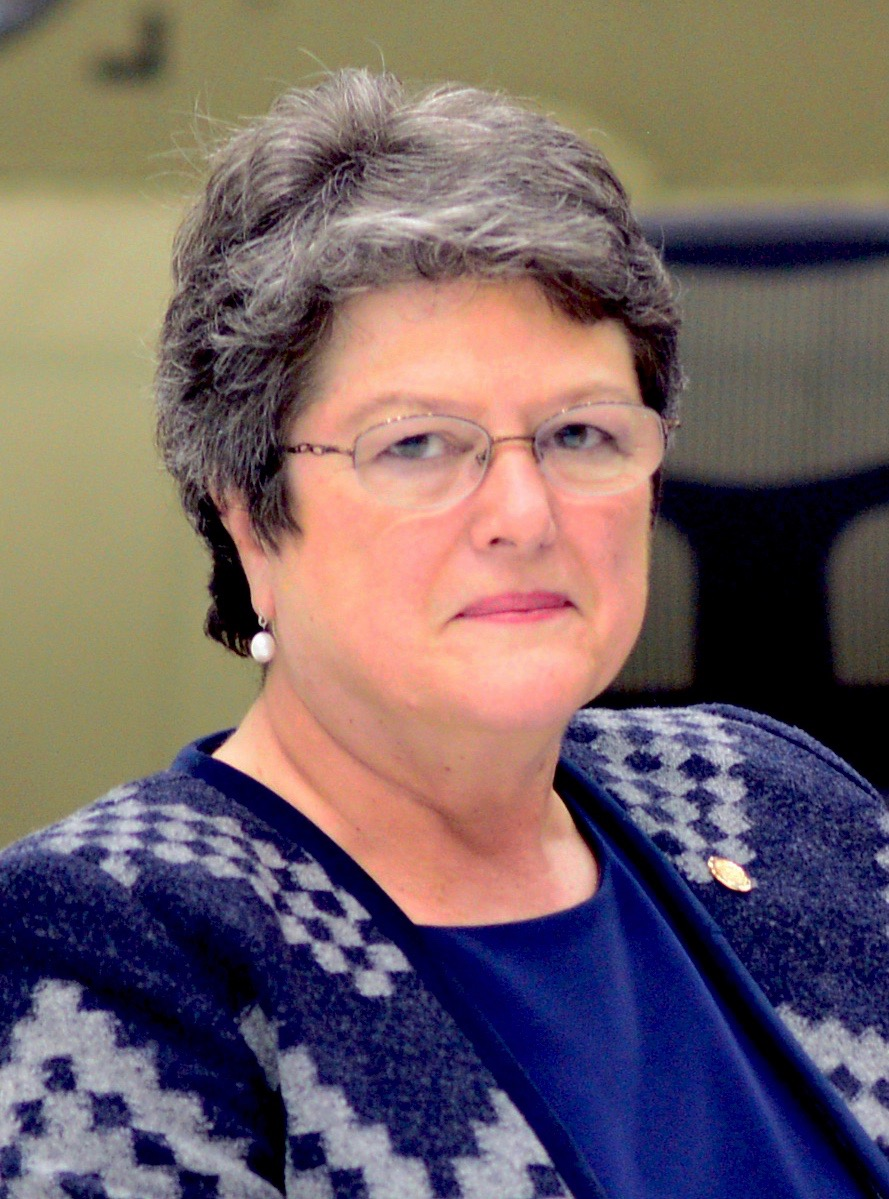
- Atkins in 2015

Chair of the Democratic Party of Oregon
- In office March 26, 2017 – March 18, 2019
- Preceded by: Frank Dixon
- Succeeded by: Carla Hanson

25th Secretary of State of Oregon
- In office March 11, 2015 – January 2, 2017
- Governor: Kate Brown
- Preceded by: Kate Brown
- Succeeded by: Dennis Richardson

Personal details
- Born: 1949 or 1950 (age 76–77) Bremerton, Washington, U.S.
- Party: Democratic
- Spouse: John Atkins
- Education: University of Washington (BA in history); University of Oregon School of Law (JD)

Jeanne Paquette Atkins (born 1949/1950) is an American politician who was the 25th Secretary of State of Oregon, having been appointed on March 6, 2015, by Governor Kate Brown following Brown's ascension to the state's highest office. Atkins is a member of the Democratic Party. She did not run for a full term as Secretary of State and later became state Democratic Party chair.

== Early career ==
Atkins ran unsuccessfully for a seat in the Oregon House of Representatives twice, in 1992 and 1994. From 1998 until 2004, she was a division director for reproductive and women's health for the Oregon Department of Human Services. Atkins also worked as staff director for Democrats in the Oregon Senate from 1993 to 1994. Between 2004 and 2009, she served as Chief of Staff for the Oregon House Democratic Caucus, then-House Speaker Jeff Merkley, and then-House Speaker Dave Hunt. In the private and nonprofit sector, she has worked for Planned Parenthood, the United Way of America, and the Women's Equity Action League.

On August 24, 2009, Atkins was appointed as United States Senator Jeff Merkley's State Director. She assumed the office on October 5, 2009. She retired from the post in January 2015.

== Oregon Secretary of State ==
Atkins was reportedly one of the first people Kate Brown considered for the position of secretary of state after Brown became governor in February 2015. She said after her appointment that she did not plan to run for a full term in 2016.

Atkins was appointed on March 6, 2015 and formally sworn in on March 11, 2015 at 1:00 PM.

== Democratic Party chair ==
In May 2017, Atkins was elected chair of the Democratic Party of Oregon, defeating Larry Taylor.

== Personal life ==
Atkins resides in Cedar Hills, Oregon. She is married to John Atkins. She is originally from Bremerton, Washington.

== See also ==
- List of female secretaries of state in the United States

Political offices
Preceded by Robert Taylor; Acting	Secretary of State of Oregon; 2015–2017	Succeeded by Dennis Richardson
Party political offices
Preceded by Frank Dixon	Chair of the Oregon Democratic Party; 2017–2019	Succeeded by K. C. Hanson
