= Ben Westlund =

American politician (1949-2010)

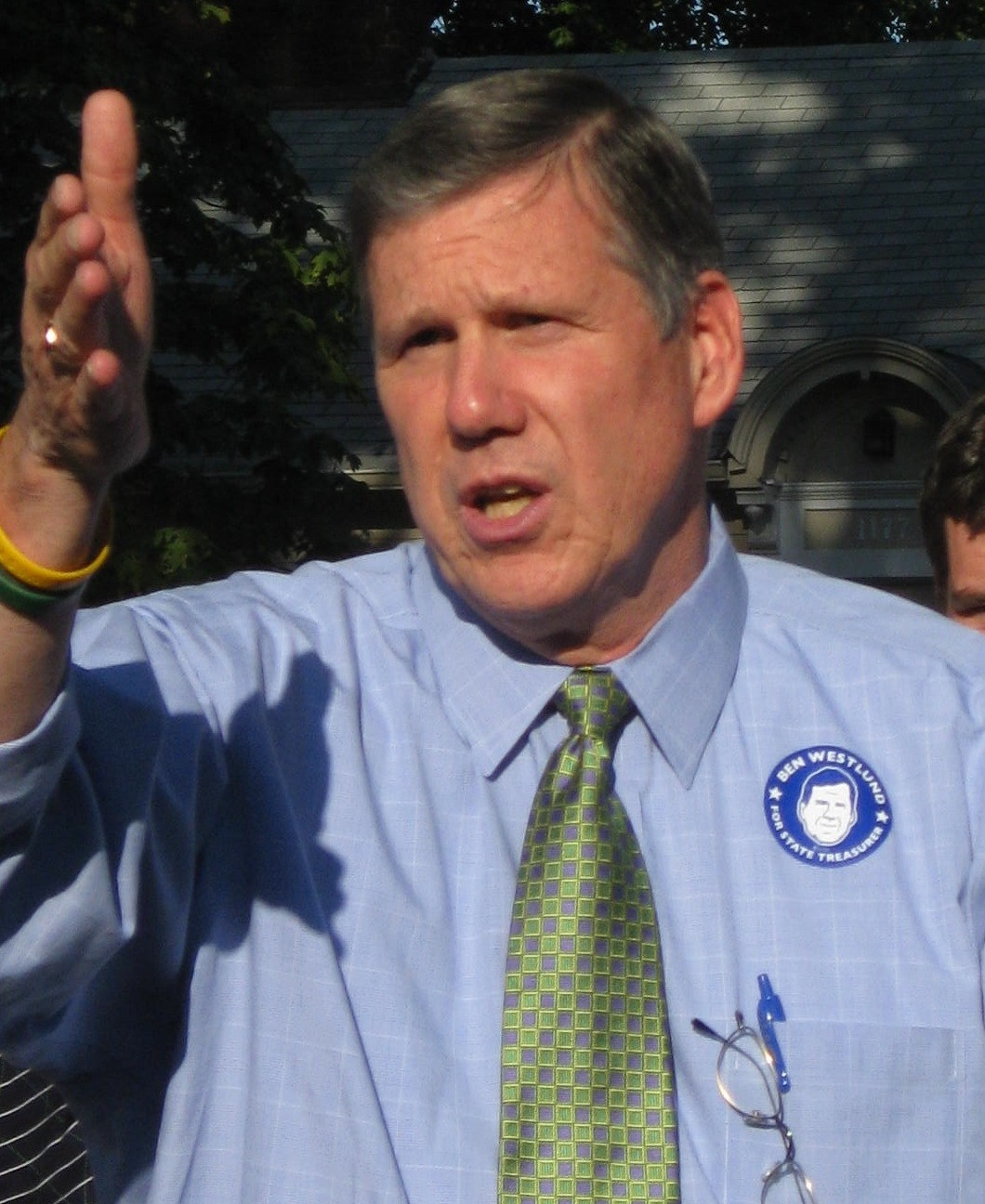

27th Treasurer of Oregon
- In office January 5, 2009 – March 7, 2010
- Governor: Ted Kulongoski
- Preceded by: Randall Edwards
- Succeeded by: Ted Wheeler

Member of the Oregon State Senate from the 27th district
- In office 2003–2008
- Preceded by: Bev Clarno
- Succeeded by: Chris Telfer

Member of the Oregon House of Representatives from the 53rd district
- In office 1997–2003
- Preceded by: Bev Clarno
- Succeeded by: Gene Whisnant

Personal details
- Born: Bernard John Westlund II; September 3, 1949 Long Beach, California, U.S.
- Died: March 7, 2010 (aged 60) Bend, Oregon, U.S.
- Party: Democratic (2006–2010)
- Other political affiliations: Independent (2006); Republican (1996–2006)
- Spouse: Libby
- Education: Whitman College
- Occupation: Rancher

Bernard John "Ben" Westlund II (September 3, 1949 – March 7, 2010) was an American politician in the U.S. state of Oregon. A Democrat, he was elected State Treasurer in 2008. Previously, Westlund served in both houses of the Oregon Legislative Assembly, as a Republican from 1996 to 2006, as an independent from 2006 to 2007, and then as a Democrat. Westlund dropped his Republican party affiliation to run for Governor of Oregon in the 2006 election, but dropped out of the race in August. In December 2006 he became a Democrat. Westlund worked as a business analyst, and ran businesses in mining, ranching, and agriculture.

== Early life ==
Westlund was born in Long Beach, California, and his family moved to Oregon when he was a teenager. He graduated from Oregon Episcopal School in 1967, then received a bachelor's degree from Whitman College in education and history and pursued some graduate studies at the University of Oregon. He moved to Central Oregon in 1974 and lived near Bend, running a ranch, with his wife Libby and two children, son B.J. and daughter Taylor.

Westlund was arrested for drunk driving and possession of cocaine in 1982. He credited that incident with convincing him to stop drinking. He later served in the Oregon Legislature with the arresting officer, Rep. John Minnis.

== Oregon legislature ==
In 1996, Westlund won election to the Oregon House of Representatives as a Republican. During four terms in the House, his most notable work was done as co-chair of the budget-writing Joint Ways and Means Committee, to which he was appointed in 2001. He unsuccessfully argued for the creation of a state sales tax as a means to balance the budget during a revenue shortfall.

That same year, he co-sponsored legislation to create the Oregon Cultural Trust, and subsequently came under fire for seeking to head the newly created organization. He served on the Cultural Trust's board until his election as State Treasurer.

In what would be Westlund's last House race, he defeated Democrat Cylvia Hayes, a Bend businesswoman who later became Oregon's first lady during the third and fourth terms of Governor John Kitzhaber.

In 2003, Westlund was appointed to the Oregon Senate to complete the term of retiring Sen. Bev Clarno. He won election to that same seat in 2004, also gaining the local Democratic nomination and facing only token opposition on the ballot. He represented District 27 in the Senate, which covers most of Deschutes County and includes the city of Bend.

During the 2004 election, Westlund endorsed Ballot Measure 36, which outlawed same-sex marriage in Oregon. After learning that research claims by Measure 36 proponents on which he had relied were rejected by the researcher, he personally called the researcher to apologize, expressing regret for supporting the measure. He subsequently sponsored a bill in the legislature to allow civil unions. That effort was defeated in part thanks to opposition by Speaker of the House Karen Minnis, wife of the officer who arrested Westlund in 1982. Civil union legislation was later resurrected and passed in the 2007 legislature, becoming law in 2008.

Westlund was pro-choice and supported access to the morning-after pill. During his time in the legislature, however, he had supported some restrictions on abortion. In 2003 he backed House Bill 2547 and in 2005 he backed H.B. 2532. Both would have created a 24-hour waiting period for women wishing to receive an abortion and required doctors to read a statement to patients about abortion. In 2005, he also supported H.B. 2605, a parental notification bill, and H.B. 2020, which would have expanded Oregon's criminal homicide law, redefining "human beings" to include fetuses and embryos at any stage of development.

== Statewide office ==
Following his switch to the Democratic Party, there was speculation that Westlund would run against Republican incumbent U.S. Senator Gordon Smith. On October 3, 2007, however, in a press conference attended by Governor Ted Kulongoski, he announced his candidacy for the office of Oregon State Treasurer. He won the Democratic primary and defeated Allen Alley in the November 2008 general election. He was sworn in on January 5, 2009. Westlund was one of the first statewide officeholders to be cross-nominated by the Independent Party of Oregon.

== 2006 Governor's race ==
On February 14, 2006, Westlund dropped his Republican registration, registered as an independent and declared his candidacy for Governor. While Westlund gathered over 36,000 signatures (18,386 valid signatures required by August 29, 2006, for ballot access), he withdrew from the race for governor on August 10, 2006, citing that he did not want to be a spoiler in the election.

== Health issues and death ==
Westlund was diagnosed with lung cancer in 2003, for which he underwent surgery, radiation and chemotherapy. Although the cancer was in remission for some time, Westlund died of cancer on March 7, 2010, while in office.

== Electoral history ==
2004 Oregon State Senator, 27th district
| Party | Candidate | Votes | % |
|---|---|---|---|
| Republican | Ben Westlund | 50,840 | 82.3 |
| Constitution | Don Loyd | 9,932 | 16.1 |
| Write-in | | 981 | 1.6 |
| Total votes | | 61,753 | 100% |

2008 Oregon State Treasurer election
| Party | Candidate | Votes | % |
|---|---|---|---|
| Democratic | Ben Westlund | 847,590 | 51.1 |
| Republican | Allen Alley | 750,484 | 45.3 |
| Constitution | Michael Marsh | 56,581 | 3.4 |
| Write-in | | 3,529 | 0.2 |
| Total votes | | 1,658,184 | 100% |

Political offices
| Preceded by Randall Edwards | Treasurer of Oregon; 2009–2010 | Succeeded by Ted Wheeler |
