= Dennis Richardson (politician) =

American politician (1949–2019)

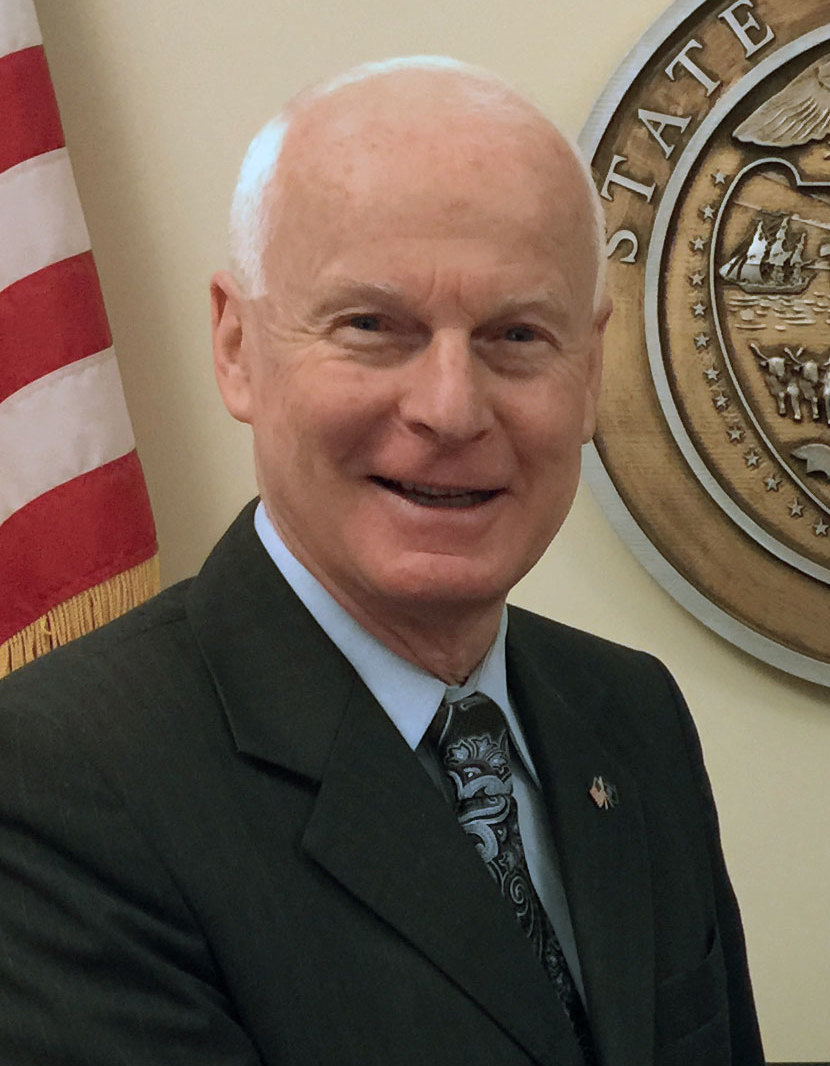
- Richardson in 2017

26th Secretary of State of Oregon
- In office January 2, 2017 – February 26, 2019
- Governor: Kate Brown
- Preceded by: Jeanne Atkins
- Succeeded by: Leslie Cummings (acting)

Member of the Oregon House of Representatives from the 4th district
- In office January 2003 – January 2015
- Preceded by: Cherryl Walker
- Succeeded by: Duane Stark

Personal details
- Born: Dennis Michael Richardson; July 30, 1949 Los Angeles, California, U.S.
- Died: February 26, 2019 (aged 69) Central Point, Oregon, U.S.
- Party: Republican
- Spouse: Cathy Richardson
- Children: 9
- Education: Brigham Young University (BA, JD)
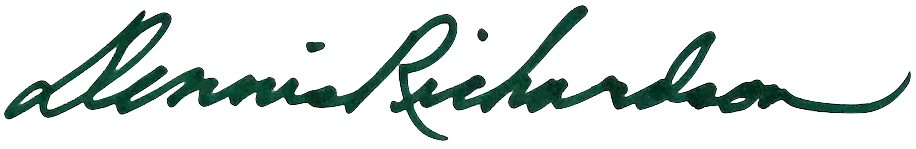
- Signature

Military service
- Allegiance: United States of America
- Branch/service: United States Army
- Battles/wars: Vietnam War

Dennis Michael Richardson (July 30, 1949 – February 26, 2019) was an American attorney, businessman, and politician who served as the 26th Secretary of State of Oregon from 2017 until his death in 2019. Richardson was from Central Point, Oregon, and served six terms in the Oregon House of Representatives as a member of the Republican Party. He represented House District 4, which included portions of Jackson and Josephine counties, and was the Republican nominee for Governor of Oregon in the 2014 election, losing to incumbent Democrat John Kitzhaber.

In 2016, Richardson was the successful Republican nominee for Oregon Secretary of State, defeating Democratic candidate Brad Avakian with 47% of the vote to Avakian's 43%. As of 2026, he is the most recent Republican to have been elected to statewide office in Oregon.

== Early life and education ==
The son of a carpenter, Richardson grew up in Southeast Los Angeles. He moved permanently to Oregon in 1979. Richardson was a member of the Church of Jesus Christ of Latter-day Saints.

He enlisted in the United States Army's Warrant Officer Helicopter Pilot Training Program. During his 1971 deployment, he flew combat missions out of Chu Lai, Vietnam. The South Vietnamese Army awarded him its Vietnamese Cross of Gallantry.

Richardson earned his bachelor's and law degrees at Brigham Young University.

== Career ==
=== Early career ===
After law school, Richardson set up his legal practice in Central Point, Oregon, where he worked for more than 30 years before retiring in 2010.

In 1984, Richardson was invited by the Reagan Administration to participate at the White House in a series of briefings by President Ronald Reagan and his Cabinet. Richardson served as Chairman of the Oregon Republican Party’s Second Congressional District in 1996–2000, and Treasurer of the Oregon Republican Party from 1999 to 2003. In 2000, Richardson was recruited to serve on the Central Point City Council, which helped inspire his decision to run for the Oregon State Legislature.

=== Oregon Legislature ===
Richardson was elected to the Oregon House of Representatives in 2002, where he served for 12 years.

In his second term, Richardson was elected by unanimous vote of both Democratic and Republican colleagues as Speaker Pro Tempore of the Oregon House of Representatives’ 73rd Legislative Session (2005) and chosen to oversee multibillion-dollar health and human service budgets as Chair of the Joint Senate–House Ways and Means Subcommittee on Health and Human Services.

In his third term, Richardson was reelected and served in the 74th Legislative Assembly (2007), where he was selected to serve as the minority whip and as vice-chair of the House Health Care Policy Committee.

Prior to the opening of the 2011 session, Richardson served on the Republican negotiations team and helped craft the "Oregon Co-Governance Model." Later in 2011, Richardson was selected to oversee the $55 billion combined state budgets as co-chair of the Full Joint Senate–House Ways and Means Committee.

=== 2014 gubernatorial campaign ===
In July 2013, Richardson announced his candidacy as a Republican candidate for the governor of Oregon in 2014, with a strong focus on small business growth in the state. He won the nomination with 65% of the vote. Richardson went on to lose the 2014 general election to Democratic incumbent, John Kitzhaber, who was elected to his fourth non-consecutive term as governor.

In the concluding weeks of the campaign, Richardson emphasized the corruption of Governor Kitzhaber and his administration and called for a federal investigation with a 13-page letter sent to the Federal Prosecutor in Portland, Oregon. Although insufficient to turn the tide on election day, newly re-elected Governor John Kitzhaber announced his resignation three months later on February 13, 2015.

=== Secretary of State ===
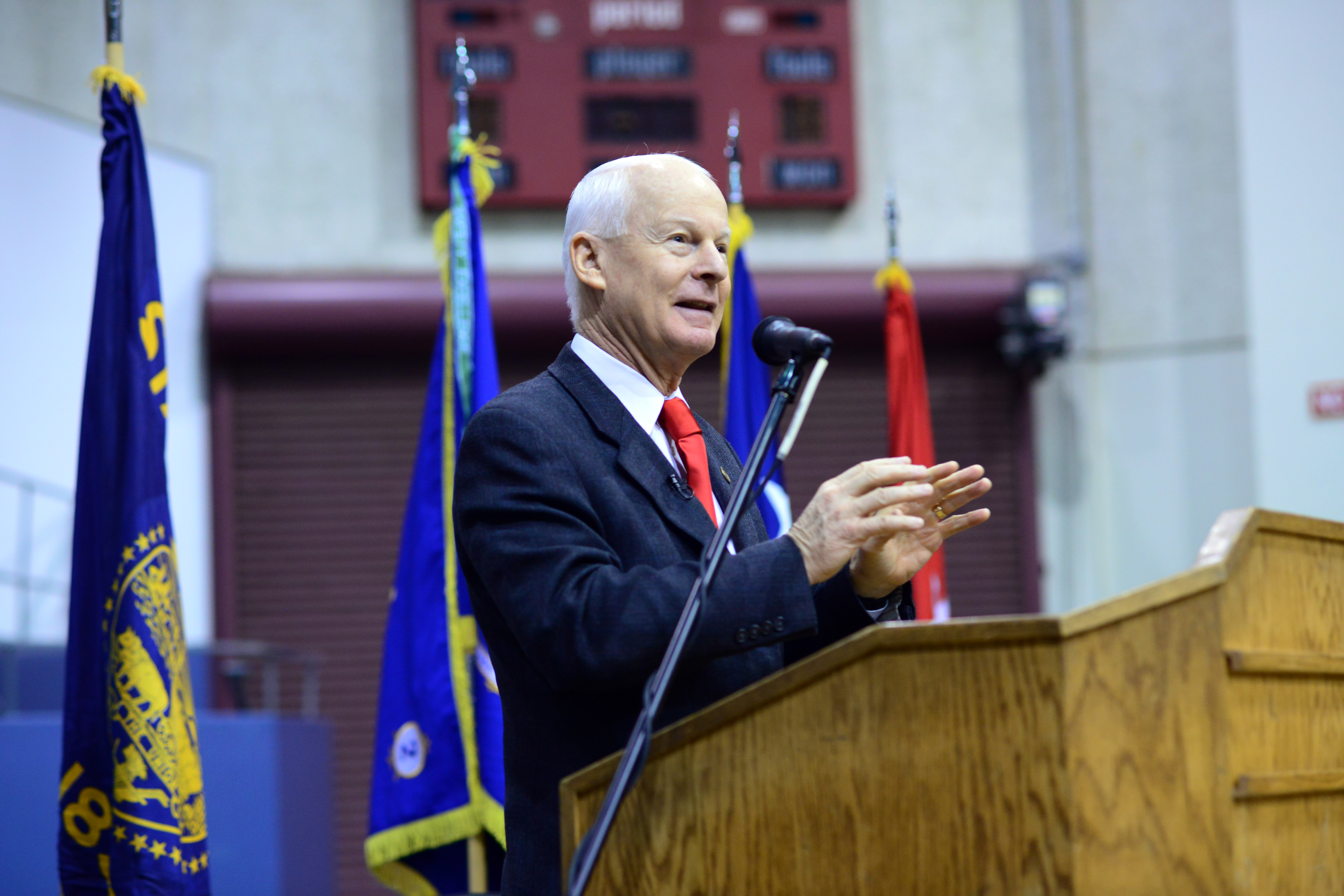
Richardson speaking to members of the Oregon Army National Guard in January 2017

In October 2015, Richardson announced he would be running for Oregon Secretary of State in 2016, hoping to replace Democratic incumbent Jeanne Atkins, who had been appointed by Governor Kate Brown following Brown's ascension to the state's highest office due to then current governor John Kitzhaber resigning amid an ethics scandal involving his fiancée. Atkins declined to seek election in the upcoming 2016 election. Unlike many states, Oregon does not have an office for lieutenant governor, therefore the secretary of state is first in line of succession to the governor. He defeated his opponent, Brad Avakian, in the 2016 election.

He was the first Republican to win a statewide election in Oregon since 2002, the first Republican to be elected Oregon secretary of state since Norma Paulus was reelected in 1980, and the only Republican to hold statewide office in Oregon. Richardson was administered the oath of office on December 30, 2016, and formally took office on January 2, 2017.

== Personal life and death ==
Following his honorable discharge from the Army, Richardson and his wife Cathy were married. His first marriage to Diane, produced a son, and his second marriage to Cathy resulted in eight daughters.

In May 2018, Richardson was diagnosed with glioblastoma, a rare form of brain cancer. He died from the effects of that illness on February 26, 2019, in Central Point, Oregon, aged 69.

Richardson was a member of The Church of Jesus Christ of Latter-day Saints.

== Electoral history ==
Oregon House District 4 election, 2002
Party	Candidate	Votes	%
Republican	Dennis Richardson	13,919	60.36
Democratic	Shayne Maxwell	9,050	39.25
Other		91	0.39
Total votes		23,060	100.00

Oregon House District 4 Republican primary, 2004
Party	Candidate	Votes	%
Republican	Dennis Richardson	6,432	98.80
Republican	Other	78	1.20
Total votes		6,510	100.00

Oregon House District 4 election, 2004
Party	Candidate	Votes	%
Republican	Dennis Richardson	21,649	70.58
Democratic	Richard Koopmans	8,937	29.13
Other		88	0.30
Total votes		30,674	100.00

Oregon House District 4 Republican primary, 2006
Party	Candidate	Votes	%
Republican	Dennis Richardson	6,248	98.69
Republican	Other	83	1.31
Total votes		6,331	100.00

Oregon House District 4 election, 2006
Party	Candidate	Votes	%
Republican	Dennis Richardson	16,604	69.50
Democratic	Richard Koopmans	7,214	30.20
Other		71	0.30
Total votes		23,889	100.00

Oregon House District 4 Republican primary, 2008
Party	Candidate	Votes	%
Republican	Dennis Richardson	6,996	87.64
Republican	Ronald Schutz	962	12.05
Republican	Other	25	0.31
Total votes		7,983	100.00

Oregon House District 4 Democratic primary, 2008
Party	Candidate	Votes	%
Democratic	Dennis Richardson (write-in)	73	29.92
Democratic	Other	171	70.08
Total votes		244	100.00

Oregon House District 4 election, 2008
Party	Candidate	Votes	%
Republican	Dennis Richardson	19,641	70.63
Independent Party	Keith Wangle	8,053	28.95
Other		116	0.42
Total votes		27,810	100.00

Oregon House District 4 Republican primary, 2010
Party	Candidate	Votes	%
Republican	Dennis Richardson	6,307	99.28
Republican	Other	46	0.72
Total votes		6,353	100.00

Oregon House District 4 election, 2010
Party	Candidate	Votes	%
Republican	Dennis Richardson	17,495	70.46
Democratic	Rick Levine	7,279	29.32
Other		57	0.23
Total votes		24,831	100.00

Oregon House District 4 Republican primary, 2012
Party	Candidate	Votes	%
Republican	Dennis Richardson	5,821	99.30
Republican	Other	41	0.70
Total votes		5,862	100.00

Oregon House District 4 Democratic primary, 2012
Party	Candidate	Votes	%
Democratic	Dennis Richardson (write-in)	42	48.84
Democratic	Other	44	51.16
Total votes		86	100.00

Oregon House District 4 election, 2012
Party	Candidate	Votes	%
Republican	Dennis Richardson	21,284	86.95
Constitution	Richard D. Hake	3,047	12.45
Other		148	0.60
Total votes		24,479	100.00

Oregon gubernatorial Republican primary, 2014
Party	Candidate	Votes	%
Republican	Dennis Richardson	163,695	65.86
Republican	Gordon Challstrom	24,693	9.93
Republican	Bruce Cuff	23,912	9.62
Republican	Mae Rafferty	16,920	6.8
Republican	Tim Carr	14,847	5.97
Republican	Darren Karr	2,474	1.0
	Write-ins	2,011	0.8
Total votes		248,552	100

County results

Oregon gubernatorial election, 2014
Party	Candidate	Votes	%
Democratic	John Kitzhaber	733,230	49.89
Republican	Dennis Richardson	648,542	44.13
Pacific Green	Jason Levin	29,561	2.01
Libertarian	Paul Grad	21,903	1.49
Constitution	Aaron Auer	15,929	1.08
Progressive	Chris Henry	13,898	0.95
	Write-ins	6,654	0.45
Total votes		1,469,717	100

Oregon secretary of state Republican primary, 2016
Party	Candidate	Votes	%
Republican	Dennis Richardson	260,622	77.89
Republican	Sid Leiken	71,992	21.51
Republican	Write-ins	2,006	0.60
Total votes		334,620	100

County results

Oregon Secretary of State election, 2016
Party	Candidate	Votes	%
Republican	Dennis Richardson	903,623	47.06%
Democratic	Brad Avakian	834,529	43.47%
Independent Party	Paul Wells	66,210	3.45%
Pacific Green	Alan Zundel	48,946	2.55%
Libertarian	Sharon Durbin	47,675	2.48%
Constitution	Michael Marsh	15,372	0.80%
	Write-ins	3,594	0.19%
Total votes		1,919,949	100%

Party political offices
Preceded by Chris Dudley	Republican nominee for Governor of Oregon; 2014	Succeeded by Bud Pierce
Political offices
Preceded by Jeanne Atkins	Secretary of State of Oregon; 2017–2019	Succeeded by Bev Clarno
