= Chris Telfer =

American politician

Member of the Oregon Lottery Commission
- In office May 1, 2013 – April 30, 2021
- Appointed by: John Kitzhaber
- Preceded by: Amy Bollman Lowery
- Succeeded by: Marty Ramirez

Member of the Oregon State Senate from the 27th District
- In office January 12, 2009 – January 14, 2013
- Succeeded by: Oran Teater

Member of the Bend City Council
- In office 2003–2008
- Preceded by: Ben Westlund
- Succeeded by: Tim Knopp

Personal details
- Party: Republican (before 2015); Independent Party of Oregon (2015–)
- Education: University of Denver; Franklin University; University of Oregon
- Profession: Certified Public Accountant

Chris Telfer is a former Republican and current Independent Party of Oregon politician and Certified Public Accountant in Bend, Oregon, United States.

Telfer serves on the Bend City Council, and was elected to the Oregon State Senate in the November 2008 elections, to succeed outgoing senator Ben Westlund. Hers was the only seat that changed parties in the Senate in that election cycle; her campaign spent $300,000 to opponent Maren Lundgren's $12,000. The shift, however, left Democrats with an 18–12 majority, allowing them to pass increases to taxes and fees without Republican support. (A 1996 law requires a 3/5 supermajority in both houses of the Oregon Legislative Assembly for such measures.)

Telfer has lived in Bend since 1977. She has two daughters.

She earned a bachelor's degree at the University of Denver, and did post-graduate work at Franklin University and the University of Oregon. She has taught at Central Oregon Community College and served as vice-chair on the Bend Development Board. She served on the Bend City Council from 2003 to 2008.

In 2010, Telfer filed for the special election for Oregon State Treasurer, to complete the term of Ben Westlund, who died in office, but lost to Democratic incumbent Ted Wheeler in the November general election.

In the Republican primary of the 2012 legislative elections, Telfer was defeated by Tim Knopp, a former state Representative and vice president of the Central Oregon Builders Association.

In 2013, she became the Oregon Lottery Commissioner. In 2016, she won the Independent Party of Oregon's nomination for Treasurer of Oregon. She lost in the general election to Tobias Read.

== Electoral history ==
2008 Oregon State Senator, 27th district
Party	Candidate	Votes	%
Republican	Chris Telfer	42,061	59.6
Democratic	Maren Lundgren	28,379	40.2
Write-in		129	0.2
Total votes		70,569	100%

2010 Oregon State Treasurer election
Party	Candidate	Votes	%
Democratic	Ted Wheeler	721,795	52.9
Republican	Chris Telfer	571,105	41.9
Progressive	Walter F. (Walt) Brown	38,316	2.8
Constitution	Michael Marsh	30,489	2.2
Write-in		1,738	0.1
Total votes		1,363,443	100%

2016 Oregon State Treasurer election
Party	Candidate	Votes	%
Democratic	Tobias Read	808,998	43.9
Republican	Jeff Gudman	766,680	41.6
Independent	Chris Telfer	173,878	9.4
Progressive	Chris Henry	90,507	4.9
Write-in		2,624	0.1
Total votes		1,842,687	100%
