= Independent Party of Oregon =

- Chairperson: Linda Williams
- Secretary-General: Sal Peralta
- Founded: January 24, 2007; 19 years ago
- Ideology: Social liberalism Big tent
- Political position: Center
- Colors: Blue and red
- United States Senate: 0 / 2
- United States House of Representatives: 0 / 5
- Executive offices: 0 / 5
- Oregon State Senate: 0 / 30
- Oregon House of Representatives: 0 / 60
- Local offices: 34+

Website
- www.indparty.com

The Independent Party of Oregon (IPO) is a centrist political party in the U.S. state of Oregon with more than 140,000 registrants since its inception in January 2007. The IPO is Oregon's third-largest political party and the first political party other than the Democratic Party and Republican Party to be recognized by the state of Oregon as a major political party.

Since 2009, the party has had multiple city and local officials elected as members. In 2021, State Senator Brian Boquist, a former Republican, became the only Independent member of the state legislature.

Positioned as a public-interest alternative for independent voters, the IPO has mostly cross-nominated candidates of different parties, in addition to nominating their own. As opposed to an ideological stance, the party's platform has advocated campaign finance regulation and elections reforms while also prioritizing issues such as the environment and the economy.

== History ==
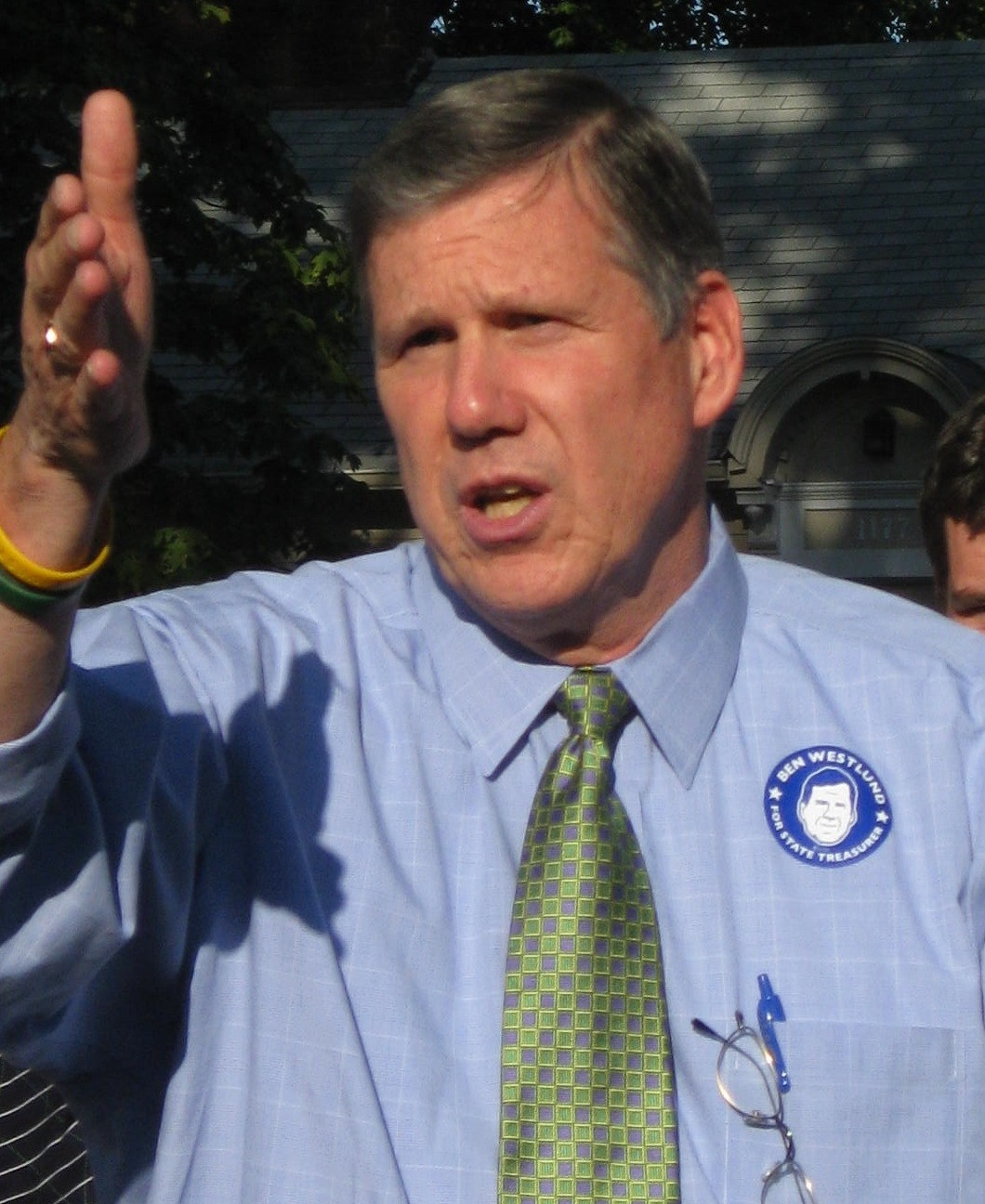
Ben Westlund

The Independent Party was formed by voter petition in 2006, after House Bill 2614, a law that made it more difficult for non-affiliated candidates to run for public office in Oregon, was enacted in 2005 by the Oregon State Legislature. The same Legislature who passed this law also disallowed non-affiliated candidates from being labeled as "independent" on ballots, freeing up the name for use by the Independent Party. IPO co-chair Dan Meek was one of two people to publicly testify in the Oregon legislature against both bills. Meek and Party Secretary Sal Peralta also lobbied in favor of repealing HB 2614, which was repealed at the end of the 2009 legislative session. The party also cited the end of Ben Westlund's campaign for governor as being due to the legal barriers he faced as an independent candidate.

The IPO is not to be confused with a previous Independent Party that existed in Oregon during the legislative election in 1874. The party was affiliated with the Granger movement and campaigned on an anti-monopoly platform, receiving support from progressives and the press. For a brief period, the party held a 23-seat plurality in the State House, and formed a coalition with the Democrats before later disbanding.

=== 2007 ===
The IPO was certified by state elections officials on January 24, 2007. The IPO criticized former Oregon Secretary of State Bill Bradbury for refusing to print new voter registration cards that would include that party as a choice. A representative of Bradbury's stated the decision was based on the cost of printing new registration cards, rather than any intent to harm a party.

=== 2008 ===
The IPO ran eight of its own candidates and cross-nominated four major party candidates in the 2008 election, including Democrats Jeff Merkley and Ben Westlund, and Vicki Berger, a Republican. Merkley was nominated by the party after John Frohnmayer, former Chair of the National Endowment for the Arts, withdrew his Independent candidacy. Joel Haugen, a Republican who won the Republican primary in the First Congressional District with more than 70% of the vote was cross-nominated by the Independent Party. The Party asked the Secretary of State to enforce existing Oregon law (ORS 254.135) and allow Haugen to appear on the ballot as a "Republican, Independent." The Secretary of State refused. After the Independent Party, joined by the Working Families Party, lost a circuit court decision that would have allowed Haugen to appear on the ballot as "Republican, Independent," Haugen decided to abandon the Republican nomination so he could appear on the ballot as "Independent". The result was that there was no "Republican" candidate on the ballot for the 1st Congressional District of Oregon. The parties withdrew their appeal of the Secretary of State's decision, after the Oregon legislature passed SB 326, which repealed some earlier restrictions on non-affiliated candidates and allowed for "fusion lite" voting

The party recognized Waldport mayor Herman Welch as the first Independent Party member to hold public office. Other Independents to hold local office are Robert Brundage of Sublimity, Soso Nedjeljko of Butte Falls, and Wayne Rofinot of Warren.

=== 2009 ===
The IPO played a significant role in passing legislation to allow a form of Fusion voting, a reform that allows candidates to list multiple party nominations on the Oregon ballot, and helped repeal the 2006 statute that made it difficult for non-affiliated candidates to run for public office.

=== 2010 ===
The IPO became the first political party in the United States to conduct a binding statewide Primary Election entirely over the internet. 86 candidates participated in the election. Former Governor John Kitzhaber, a Democrat, won the party's nomination in a three-person race. 30 Republicans, 28 Democrats, three Independents, and a Libertarian were nominated by the party. The election was the largest nominating process ever held by an Oregon minor political party.

=== 2011 ===
The Oregon legislature drew condemnation from five Oregon newspaper editorial boards and from two former Secretaries of State for considering legislation that would have forced the Independent Party of Oregon to change its name by the end of the year or disband.

=== 2015 ===
==== Mistaken members controversy ====
In March, as the Independent Party began meeting the requirements of major party status, the Democratic Party of Oregon sponsored a survey of 400 IPO members questioning if they originally intended to register with the party. The results found 46% did not know they were affiliated with the party, with 24% believing they were registered as an unaffiliated voter. When asked if they were to register again, only 47% said they would remain IPO members. The Oregon Democratic and Republican parties issued a joint press release on the poll, questioning about the party's status.

IPO officials rejected the poll, with party secretary Sal Peralta claiming the Democrats and Republicans feeling threatened by their growth. Co-chairman Dan Meek accused the DPO as "quite ready to attack and destroy any new party that seeks to compete with them", pointing to the poll as the most recent attack against the party, four years after a bill was introduced threatening them to disassemble. In response, the Independent Party released its own poll showing 11% of Oregon voters self-affiliate with the party, and 80% stating they would join or consider voting for candidates of the party. 5 months later, the Secretary of State announced the IPO had qualified as a major party in Oregon.

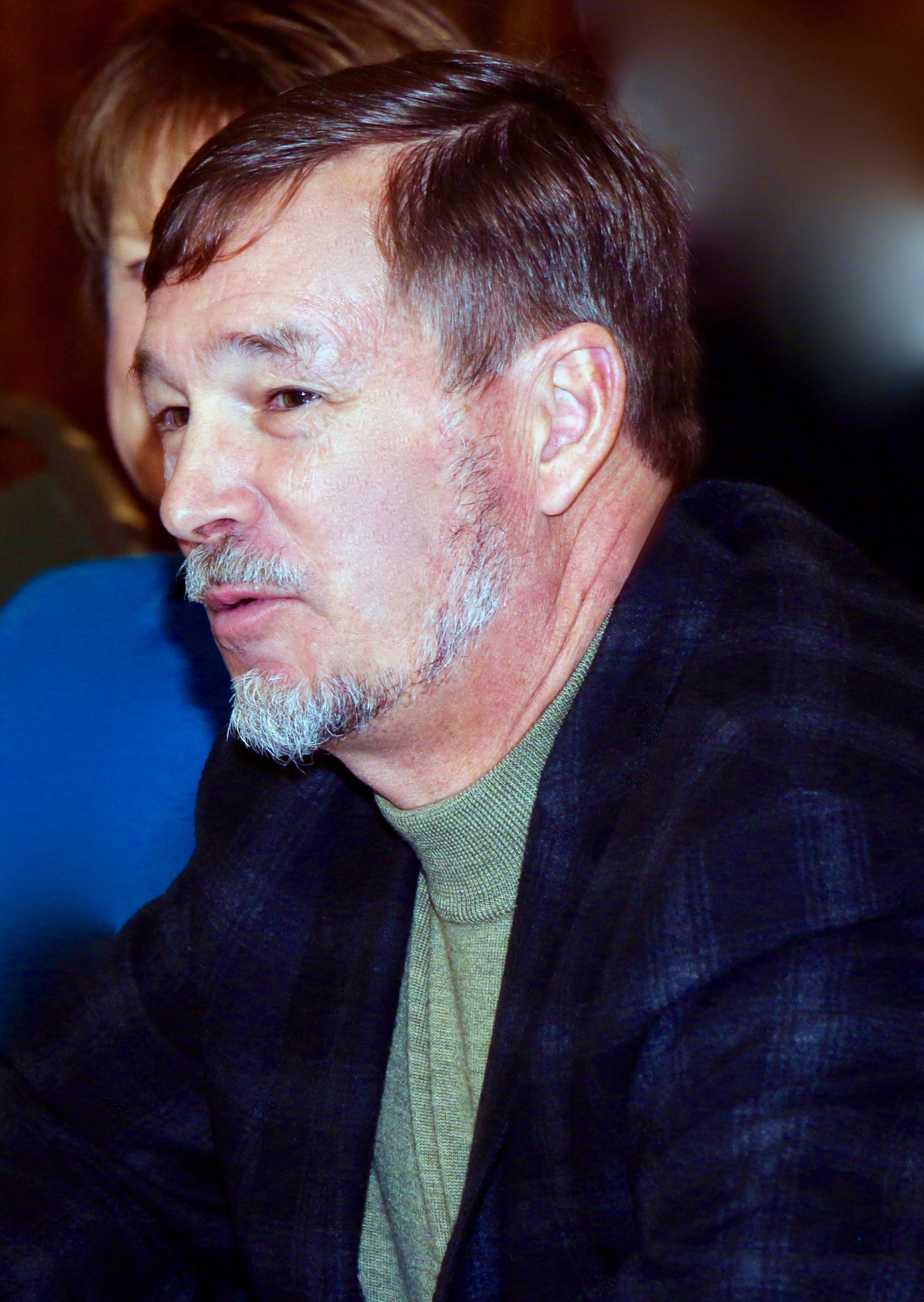
Brian Boquist

=== 2021 ===
In 2021, Oregon State Senator Brian Boquist left the Republican Party and joined the Independent Party. Sen. Boquist had previously described himself a 'Constitutional Republican' before leaving the party in mid-January. He has said other legislators have expressed a similar desire to switch parties in order to reach common ground. Following this, Sen. Art Robinson announced he would cease caucusing with the Senate GOP, and instead meet to strategize with Sen. Boquist. However in September 2023, Boquist would register as a Republican in his state senate race, leaving the Independent party without any state-level representation.

== Growth ==
The Independent Party of Oregon is one of the largest minor political parties in the United States. From its inception in January 2007 through September 2011, the party added more than 90,000 members, making it the third largest political party in Oregon. From January 2007 to December 2010, its members accounted for approximately 40% of the net growth in the Oregon electorate.

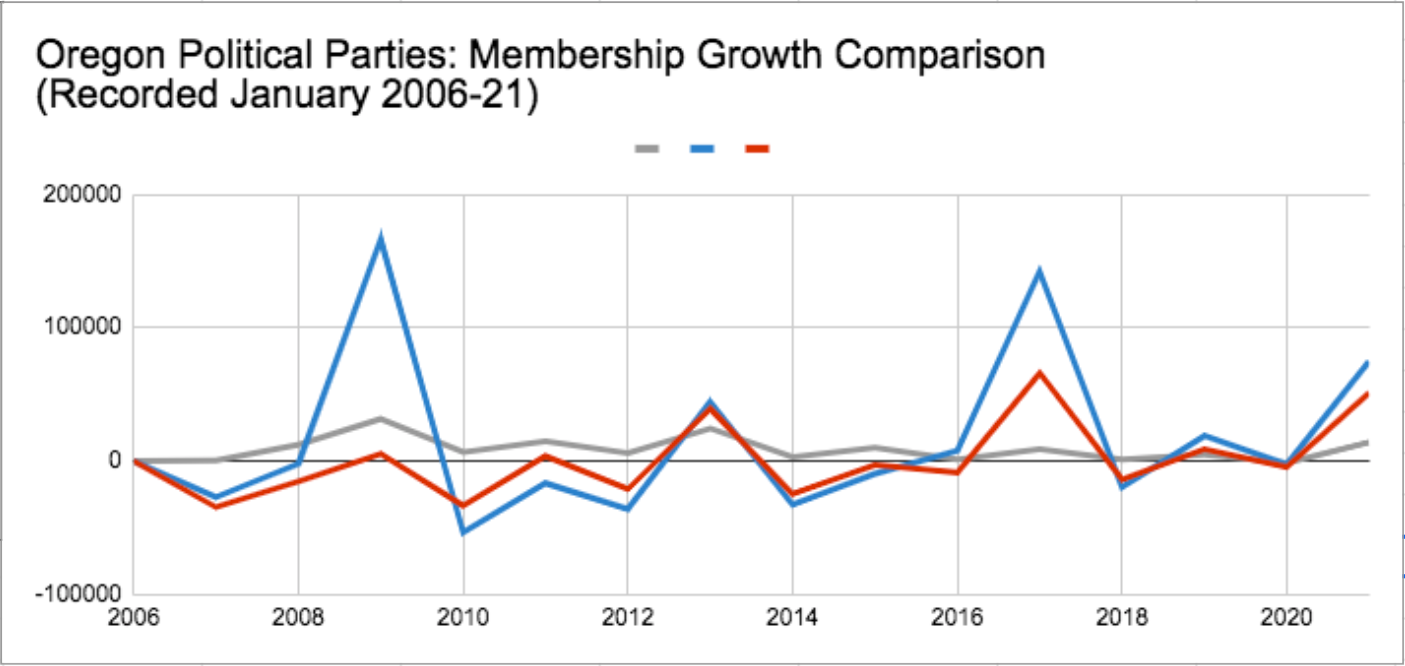
Growth of the IPO compared to the major political parties (Dem. - Blue) (Rep. - Red) (Ind. - Grey)

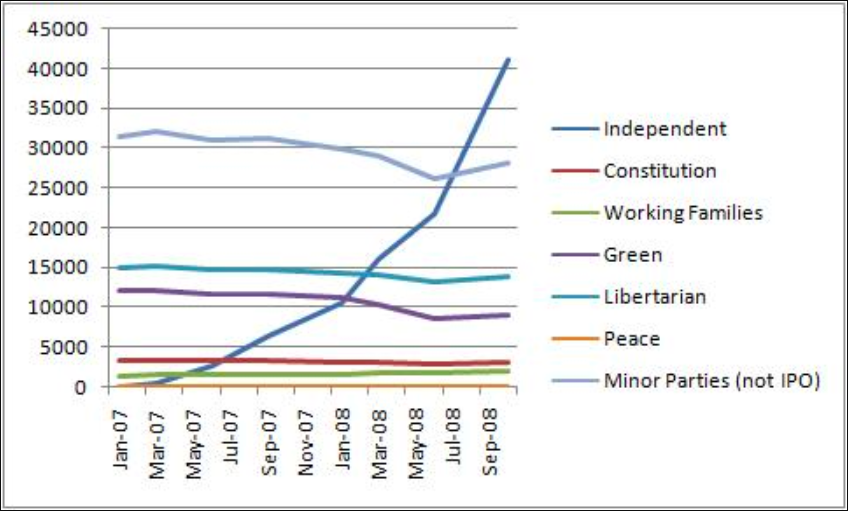
The IPO's membership growth compared to other minor parties in Oregon

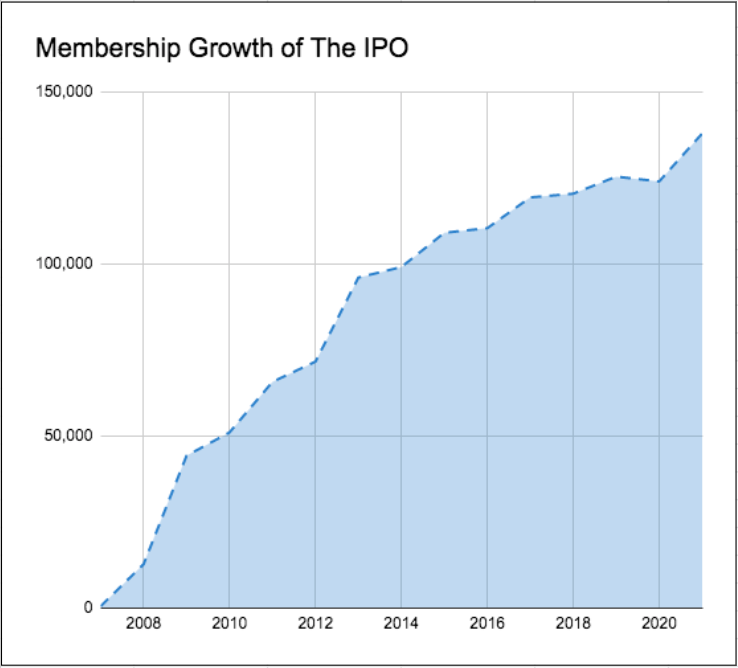
Party membership growth from January 2007 - January 2021

In August 2015, the IPO qualified under Oregon law as a major party with 109,300 members. As a major party, they were provided state-funding for primaries. In 2019, the party returned to minor party status reportedly due to the automatic voter registration law increasing the unaffiliated voter count. This subsequently decreased the party's share of the voter population to below the 5% major party threshold. Despite this, the party has continued to grow since it was qualified as a major party.

Briefly during 2023, the Independent Party was one of a few third-parties in the U.S. to have an incumbent party member in a state legislature. Among city councilors, county commissioners, and mayors in the state, 6.5% as of 2020 are IPO members. In August 2015, The Portland Tribune identified 34 non-partisan local office holders as IPO members.

Membership by county (September, 2021)
| County | Registered Independent Voters |
|---|---|
| Baker | 5.45% |
| Benton | 4.94% |
| Clackamas | 5.12% |
| Clatsop | 5.02% |
| Columbia | 4.7% |
| Coos | 5.19% |
| Crook | 5.34% |
| Curry | 5.97% |
| Deschutes | 5.96% |
| Douglas | 5.12% |
| Gilliam | 4.81% |
| Grant | 5.16% |
| Harney | 4.71% |
| Hood River | 4.49% |
| Jackson | 5.2% |
| Jefferson | 5.03% |
| Josephine | 5.08% |
| Klamath | 5.09% |
| Lake | 4.56% |
| Lane | 4.81% |
| Lincoln | 5.23% |
| Linn | 5.14% |
| Malhuer | 3.29% |
| Marion | 4.63% |
| Morrow | 4.41% |
| Multnomah | 3.62% |
| Polk | 5.11% |
| Sherman | 4.19% |
| Tillamook | 4.71% |
| Umatilla | 4.23% |
| Union | 4.93% |
| Wallowa | 4.5% |
| Wasco | 4.63% |
| Washington | 4.55% |
| Wheeler | 4.56% |
| Yamhill | 5.18% |

== Platform ==
The Independent Party of Oregon describes their party as a platform for independent voters to have a voice in government as an informed, non-tribalistic voting block promoting a public-interest alternative. The party does not adhere to an ideology, instead they support candidates of a variety of positions who support their values. To assemble a platform, the Independent Party surveys their members on their priorities for the state, using public opinion information and academic research. In the party's 2020-21 platform introduction, they state:

"Our party’s growth is driven by a widespread belief that our government, and especially our legislative process, primarily serve the interests of self-interested, non-representative groups of special interests ...Our intent and hope is to serve as a source of gravity for policies that serve the public interest and as a counter to the polarization, cynicism and anger that are becoming resonant in our current political culture."

According to its bylaws, the Independent Party of Oregon holds a number of initiatives. The party wants to increase voter participation and involvement. It advocates reform in specific areas of government, wanting to reduce the advantage of incumbency and the influence of campaign contributions on politicians and policy decisions. As of 2021, they have emphasized the environment, public health, the economy, and governmental reform as policy areas to address. The party hopes to achieve this through fiscally sound transparent decisions that create a taxation system that benefits all Oregonians.

=== Individual rights ===
The Independent Party promotes a "modern understanding" of rights enumerated in the U.S. and Oregon constitution. They also value the unenumerated rights outlined in the Ninth Amendment, to which they include the right to "speak, to vote freely, to marry, and to make intimate medical and family planning decisions without government interference."

The party supports state laws and amendments to protect existing constitutional protections that may be violated at the federal level. However, the IPO opposes local gun laws that prevent officials from enforcing state or federal law.

=== Governmental reform ===
The IPO has led multiple efforts for campaign finance reform in the state, including Measure 107 in 2020, which passed with 78% of the vote.

The party seeks to either eliminate or open the partisan primaries in Oregon. Previously, the IPO came out against a 2014 measure that would implement a top-two open primary in the state, arguing that it would destroy minor parties and reduce voter choices. The party supports voting systems like ranked-choice voting and STAR voting. The party also advocates petitions in the state to go through an initiative primary, a system that would have measures be voted on in the May primary, with those receiving a majority approval advancing to the November election.

The Independent Party endorsed the effort to turn over Portland's city commission government in favor of multi-member commissioner districts and ranked-choice voting.

=== Education ===
The party seeks more mental healthcare training for community providers. The IPO also urges a greater investment in regional vocational Career Technical Education centers for essential jobs, as well as more funding in the STEM fields.

=== Environment ===
The IPO supports reducing emissions that cause climate change to strengthen communities from climate threats. The party opposes the excessive use of water many livestock and animal rearing facilities extract, and their damaging effort on the surrounding area. The party supports the preservation and restoration of habitats and state forests, as well as further protection from climate change.

== Organization ==
As prescribed by Oregon statutes governing minor political parties, the party comprises all registered voters designating their party affiliation as Independent. In accordance with party bylaws, the party consists of members and supporting members. A five-person state council of officers, and at-large delegates elected by the party membership, is responsible for conducting the day-to-day affairs of the party. Candidates are nominated in caucuses, the members of which are supporting members of the party, elected by the party's full membership.

=== Officers ===
- Co-Chair: Linda Williams
- Co-Chair: Dan Meek
- Co Chair: Drew Kaza
- Secretary: Sal Peralta
- Treasurer: Joan Horton
- State Council Member: Ken Smith
- Nominating Caucus: Travis Diskin

== 2008 election ==
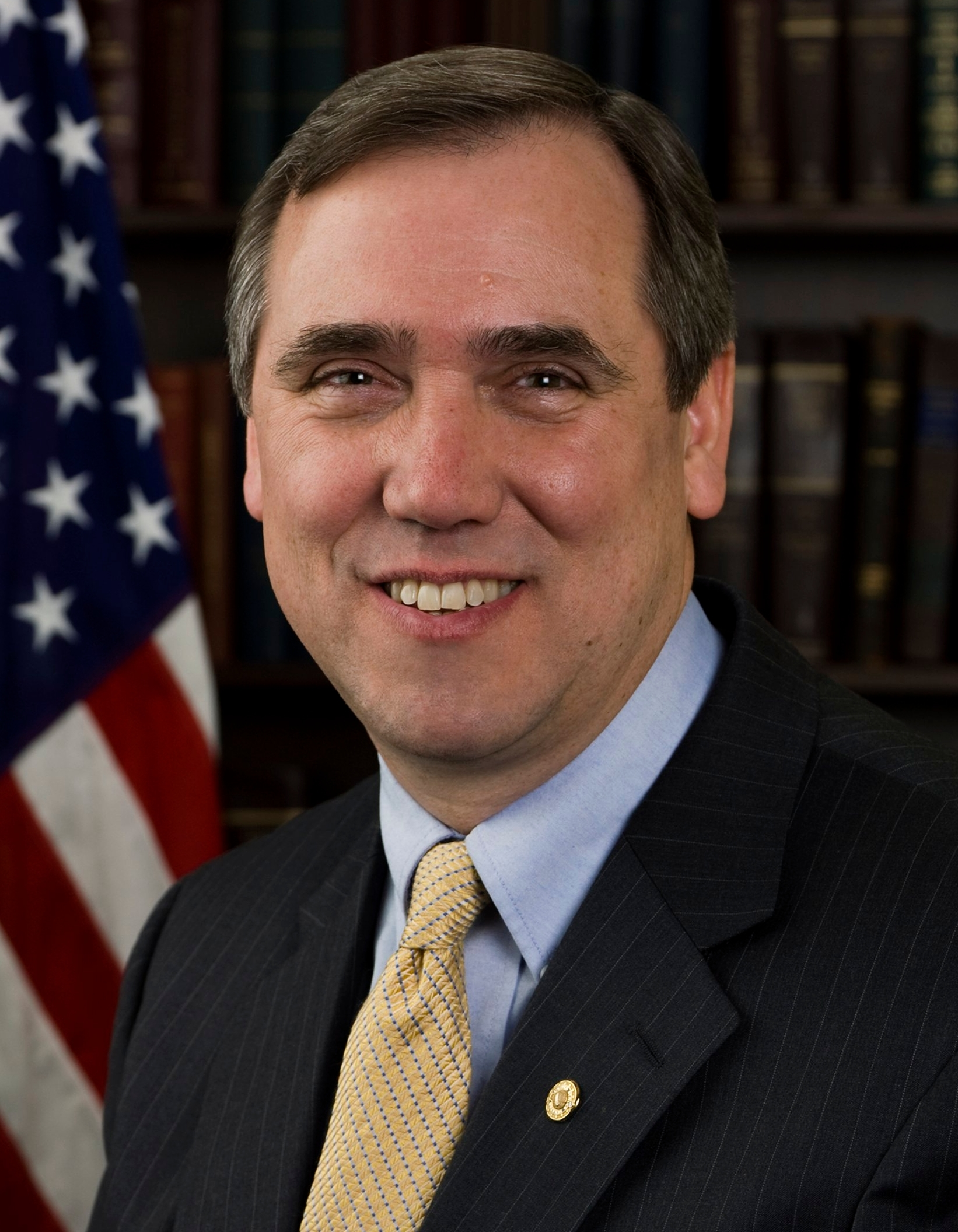
Jeff Merkley

The Independent Party became the first Oregon minor political party in more than 80 years to cross-nominate major party candidates for public office. Its candidates generally fared better than other minor party candidates in terms of votes garnered. Joel Haugen received 19% of the vote in a five-candidate race for the U.S. House of Representatives in the first congressional district. State legislative candidates Terry Rilling, Pete Belcastro, and Keith Wangle garnered 40%, 44%, and 30% of the vote respectively in their races for the Oregon House of Representatives. Independent Party member Jim Torrey was defeated by incumbent mayor Kitty Piercy in Eugene's non-partisan mayoral election, 48.8% to 47.4%.

IPO 2008 general election results
| Race | Candidate | Party | Notes | Votes |
|---|---|---|---|---|
| U.S. Senate | Jeff Merkley | Cross-nominated Democratic | Defeated incumbent Gordon Smith | 864,392 (48.90%) |
| Oregon State Treasurer | Ben Westlund | Cross-nominated Democratic | Defeated Allen Alley | 847,590 (51.12%) |
| U.S. House of Representatives, CD1 | Joel Haugen | Independent Republican | Lost to incumbent David Wu | 58,279 (17.54%) |
| State Representative, HD4 | Keith Wangle | Independent | Lost to incumbent Dennis Richardson | 8,053 (29.07%) |
| State Representative, HD5 | Pete Belcastro | Independent | Lost to incumbent Peter Buckley | 11,653 (38.7%) |
| State Representative, HD18 | Jim Gilbert | Cross-nominated Democratic | Lost to incumbent Vic Gilliam | 11,702 (43.94%) |
| State Representative, HD20 | Vicki Berger | Cross-nominated Republican | Defeated Richard Riggs | 15,829 (54.47%) |
| State Representative, HD29 | Terry Rilling | Independent | Lost to incumbent Chuck Riley | 7,321 (39.23%) |

Other candidates: Stephen Bradley (Curry County Commissioner), Col. Dale Potter (Wallowa County Commissioner), Ken Wick (Wallowa County Commissioner). The party also endorsed Kate Brown for Secretary of State.

== 2010 election ==
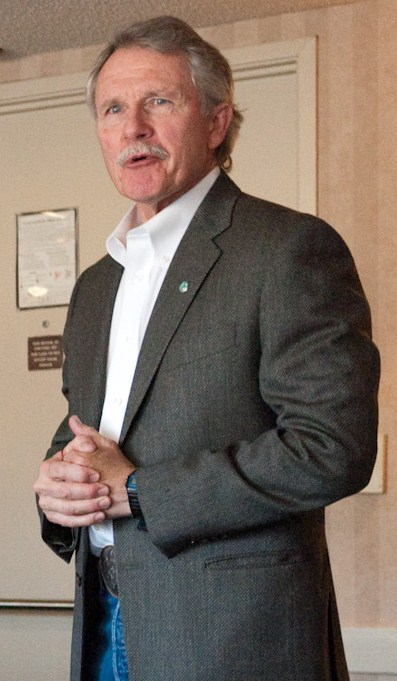
John Kitzhaber

In July, 2010, the Independent Party of Oregon became the first Oregon political party to conduct a primary election at its own expense in more than 100 years; the first Oregon political party ever to conduct a binding primary election entirely over the internet; and the first Oregon minor political party to conduct a primary election. More than 2,000 Independent Party members voted in the election, which involved 77 candidates, including 39 Democrats, 32 Republicans, a Libertarian and Green. Although being the largest nominating process held by a minor political party in Oregon, only 4% of its members voted in the primary. This low turnout was possibly the result of members having to receive a mailed passcode from the party to enter on the internet in order to participate.

Winners of the IPO Primary election included Governor John Kitzhaber and 30 people who served in the Oregon legislature in 2011. Independent Party member Jeff Caton, who ran in House District 48, won 43 percent of the vote. This was the closest a minor party candidate had come to winning federal or state office in Oregon since at least 1932.

IPO 2010 general election results
| Race | Candidate | Party | Notes | Votes |
|---|---|---|---|---|
| Oregon Governor | John Kitzhaber | Cross-nominated Democrat | Defeated Chris Dudley | 716,525 (49.3%) |
| U.S. House of Representatives (CD3) | Jeff Lawrence | Cross-nominated Libertarian | Lost to Earl Blumenauer | 8,380 (3.04%) |
| U.S. House of Representatives (CD4) | Art Robinson | Cross-nominated Republican | Lost to Pete DeFazio | 129,877 (43.58%) |
| U.S. House of Representatives (CD5) | Scott Bruun | Cross-nominated Republican | Lost to Kurt Schrader | 130,313 (45.96%) |
| State Representative, HD1 | Wayne Krieger* | Cross-nominated Republican | Defeated Eldon Rollins | 18,115 |
| State Representative, HD3 | Wally Hicks | Cross-nominated Republican | Defeated Barbara Gonzales | 16,054 |
| State Representative, HD9 | Arnie Roblan* | Cross-nominated Democrat | Defeated R. Scott Roberts | 12,094 |
| State Representative, HD10 | Jean Cowan* | Cross-nominated Democrat | Defeated Becky Lemler | 14,475 |
| State Representative, HD11 | Phil Barnhart* | Cross-nominated Democrat | Defeated Kelly Lovelace | 15,244 |
| State Representative, HD13 | Nancy Nathanson* | Cross-nominated Democrat | Defeated Bill Young | 15,967 |
| State Representative, HD14 | Kevin Prociw | Independent | Lost to Val Hoyle* | 1,078 |
| State Representative, HD15 | Bud Laurent | Cross-nominated Democrat | Lost to Andy Olson* | 7,901 |
| State Representative, HD16 | Rose Cook | Cross-nominated Republican | Lost to Sara Gelser* | 7,096 |
| State Representative, HD20 | Vicki Berger* | Cross-nominated Republican | Defeated Mike Powers | 15,143 |
| State Representative, HD21 | Marvin Sannes | Cross-nominated Republican | Lost to Brian Clem* | 6,494 |
| State Representative, HD22 | Betty Komp* | Cross-nominated Democrat | Defeated Kathy LeCompte | 6,083 |
| State Representative, HD23 | Jim Thompson* | Cross-nominated Republican | Defeated Wesley West | 16,371 |
| State Representative, HD24 | Susan Sokol-Blosser | Cross-nominated Democrat | Lost to Jim Weidner* | 11,380 |
| State Representative, HD26 | Matt Wingard* | Cross-nominated Republican | Defeated Sandy Webb | 16,362 |
| State Representative, HD27 | Tobias Read* | Cross-nominated Democrat | Defeated Dan Lucas | 15,398 |
| State Representative, HD29 | Katie Riley | Cross-nominated Democrat | Lost to Katie Eyre Brewer | 8,009 |
| State Representative, HD30 | Shawn Lindsay | Cross-nominated Republican | Defeated Doug Ainge | 12,501 |
| State Representative, HD31 | Ed DeCoste | Cross-nominated Republican | Lost to Brad Witt* | 10,300 |
| State Representative, HD32 | Deborah Boone* | Cross-nominated Democrat | Defeated Lew Barnes | 12,977 |
| State Representative, HD35 | Gordon Fiddes | Cross-nominated Republican | Lost to Margaret Doherty* | 9,864 |
| State Representative, HD37 | Will Rasmussen | Cross-nominated Democrat | Lost to Julie Parrish | 12,982 |
| State Representative, HD39 | Bill Kennemer* | Cross-nominated Republican | Defeated Alice Norris | 14,284 |
| State Representative, HD40 | Dave Hunt* | Cross-nominated Democrat | Defeated Deborah Gerritzen | 12,500 |
| State Representative, HD41 | Carolyn Tomei* | Cross-nominated Democrat | Defeated Hugo Schulz | 17,092 |
| State Representative, HD46 | Ben Cannon* | Cross-nominated Democrat | Defeated Russell Turner | 18,418 |
| State Representative, HD48 | Jeff Caton | Independent | Lost to Mike Schaufler* | 7,246 |
| State Representative, HD50 | Cheryl Myers | Cross-nominated Democrat | Lost to Patrick Sheehan | 10,330 |
| State Representative, HD52 | Mark Johnson | Cross-nominated Republican | Defeated Suzanne Vanorman* | 14,012 |
| State Representative, HD54 | Jason Conger | Cross-nominated Republican | Defeated Judy Stiegler* | 16,391 |
| State Representative, HD56 | Bill Garrard* | Cross-nominated Republican | uncontested | 15,402 |
| State Representative, HD59 | John Huffman* | Cross-nominated Republican | Defeated Will Boettner | 15,033 |

- denotes incumbent

== 2014 election ==
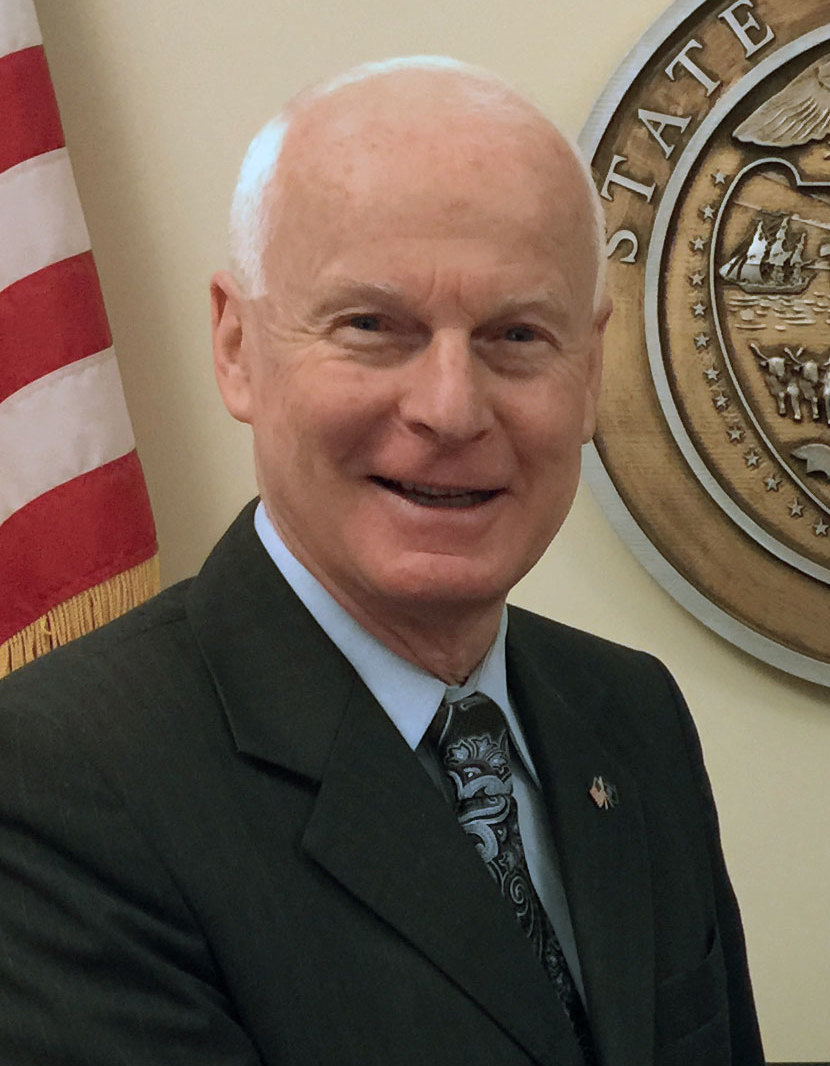
Dennis Richardson

More Republicans were cross-nominated by the party in this election year compared to the last. Despite previously endorsing Kitzhaper for governor in 2010, Republican Dennis Richardson instead won the primary with 62% of the vote. Voter turnout was lower in the primary, with only 1,140 of members participating.

IPO 2014 general election results
| Race | Candidate | Party | Notes | Votes |
|---|---|---|---|---|
| U.S. Senate | Jeff Merkley | Cross-nominated Democrat | defeated Monica Wehby | 814,537 (55.7%) |
| U.S. House of Representatives (CD3) | James Buchal | Cross-nominated Republican | lost to Earl Blumenauer | 57,424 (19.6%) |
| Governor | Dennis Richardson | Cross-nominated Republican | lost to John Kitzhaper | 648,542 (44.1%) |
| State Senator, SD3 | Dave Dotterer | Cross-nominated Republican | lost to Alan Bates | 23,700 (44.5%) |
| State Senator, SD10 | Jackie Winters | Cross-nominated Republican | unopposed | 38,129 (86.6%) |
| State Senator, SD13 | Kim Thatcher | Cross-nominated Republican | defeated Ryan Howard | 27,638 (58.5%) |
| State Senator, SD16 | Drew Kaza | Independent | lost to Betsy Johnson | 6,603 (13.47%) |
| State Senator, SD17 | Elizabeth Hayward | Cross-nominated Democrat | defeated John Verbeek | 30,677 (65.9%) |
| State Senator, SD20 | Alan Olsen | Cross-nominated Republican | defeated Jamie Damon | 26,750 (52.6%) |
| State Senator, SD26 | Chuck Thomsen | Cross-nominated Republican | defeated Richard Bruce | 24,422 (56.5%) |
| State Representative, HD10 | David Gomberg | Cross-nominated Democrat | unopposed | 16,681 (96.9%) |
| State Representative, HD22 | Matt Geiger | Cross-nominated Republican | lost to Betty Komp | 5,329 (42.9%) |
| State Representative, HD24 | Ken Moore | Cross-nominated Democrat | lost to Jim Weidner | 10,845 (45.9%) |
| State Representative, HD25 | Chuck Smith | Independent | lost to Bill Post | 9,574 (43.3%) |
| State Representative, HD26 | John Davis | Cross-nominated Republican | defeated Eric Squires | 13,546 (57.8%) |
| State Representative, HD30 | Joe Gallegos | Cross-nominated Democrat | defeated Dan Mason | 10,426 (50.0%) |
| State Representative, HD39 | Bill Kennemer | Cross-nominated Republican | unopposed | 20,041 (96.7%) |
| State Representative, HD46 | Alissa Keny-Guyer | Cross-nominated Democrat | unopposed | 17,930 (96.8%) |
| State Representative, HD51 | Jodi Bailey | Cross-nominated Republican | Lost to Shemia Fagan | 9,450 (47.1%) |
| State Representative, HD52 | Mark Johnson | Cross-nominated Republican | defeated Stephanie Nystrom | 13,014 (54.4%) |
| State Representative, HD54 | Knute Buehler | Cross-nominated Republican | defeating Craig Wilhelm | 10,876 (41.3%) |

== 2016 election ==
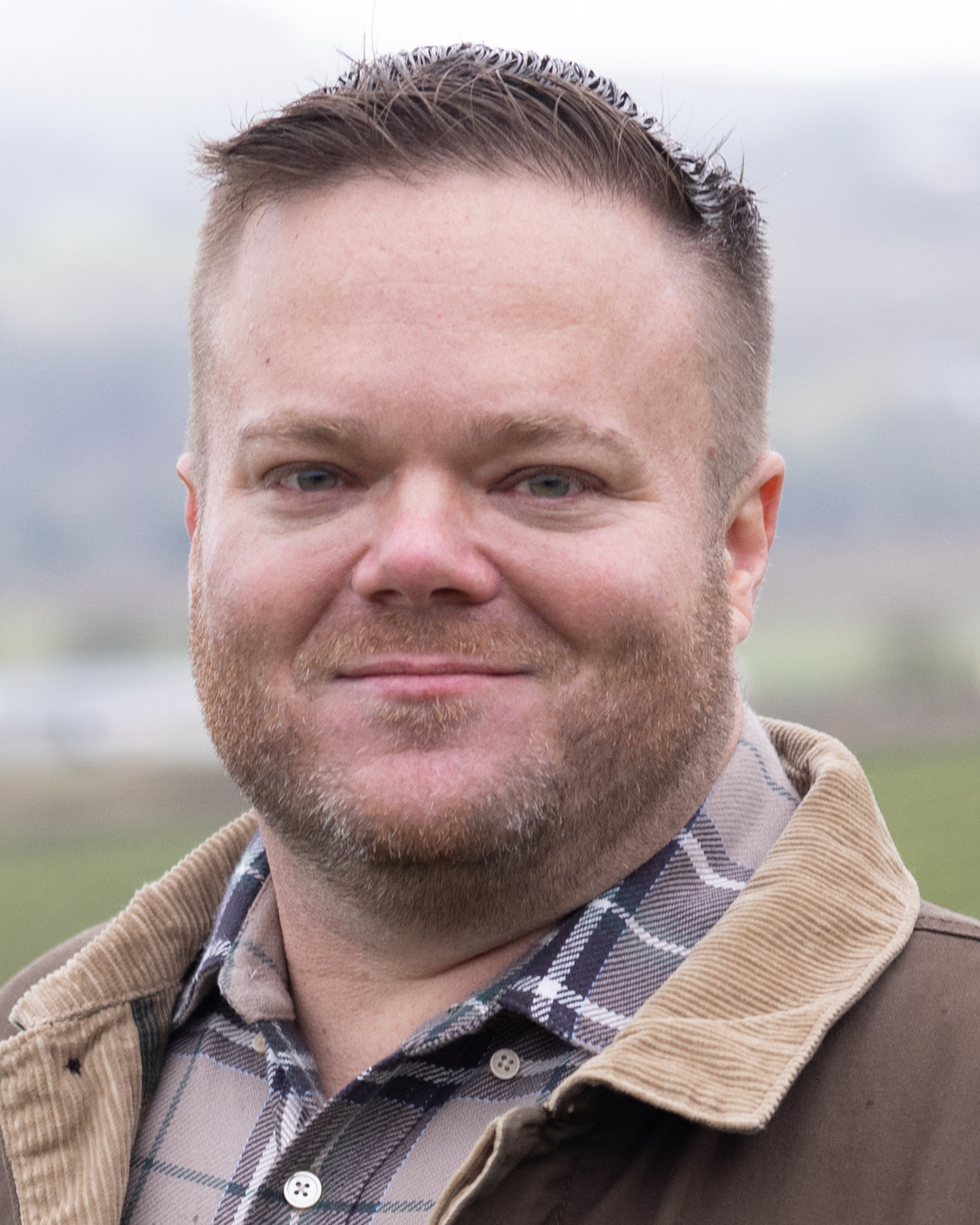
Cody Reynolds

The 2016 election was the first election where the IPO had a state-funded primary as a major party. In total, 45,875 voters participated in the May primary, of which 20,660 were non-affiliated voters who had requested a ballot in their open primary. This was a higher voter turnout compared to the minor parties in the state, yet lower compared to the Democrat and Republican primaries.

Chris Telfer, a certified public accountant, city council member, and former Republican state senator, was nominated by the party for state treasurer. Despite receiving endorsements from fellow state senators and The Oregonian editorial board, Telfer received 176,892 (9.42%) of the vote, losing to Tobias Read. The Independent Party nominated Cliff Thomason as their candidate in the 2016 gubernatorial election. Netting 2.44% of the popular vote. The party did not nominate another 2016 presidential candidate after their endorsed candidate Bernie Sanders dropped out of the 2016 Democratic Party presidential primaries.

IPO 2016 general election results
| Race | Candidate | Party | Notes | Votes |
|---|---|---|---|---|
| U.S. Senate | Steven Cody Reynolds | Independent | Lost to incumbent Ron Wyden | 59,516 (3.05%) |
| U.S. House of Representatives (CD1) | Suzanne Bonamici | Cross-Nominated Democrat | Defeated Brian Heinrich | 225,391 (59.6%) |
| U.S. House of Representatives (CD2) | Greg Walden | Cross-Nominated Republican | Defeated Jim Crary | 272,952 (71.7%) |
| U.S. House of Representatives (CD3) | David W. Walker | Independent | Lost to incumbent Earl Blumenauer | 78,154 (20.5%) |
| U.S. House of Representatives (CD4) | Peter DeFazio | Cross-Nominated Democrat | Defeated Art Robinson | 220,628 (55.5%) |
| Oregon Governor | Cliff Thomason | Independent | Lost to incumbent Kate Brown | 47,481 (2.44%) |
| Oregon Secretary of State | Paul Damian Wells | Independent | Lost to Dennis Richardson | 66,210 (3.45%) |
| Oregon State Treasurer | Chris Telfer | Independent | Lost to Tobias Read | 176,892 (9.42%) |
| State Representative, HD1 | David Brock Smith | Cross-Nominated Republican | Defeated Terry Brayer | 20,212 (59.79%) |
| State Representative, HD3 | Carl Wilson | Cross-Nominated Republican | Defeated Tom Johnson | 21,957 (72.39%) |
| State Representative, HD4 | Duane Stark | Cross-Nominated Republican | uncontested | 21,957 (98.33%) |
| State Representative, HD5 | Pam Marsh | Cross-Nominated Democrat | Defeated Steven Richie | 22,440 (62.71%) |
| State Representative, HD6 | Sal Esquivel | Cross-Nominated Republican | Defeated Mike Moran | 15,931 (56.48%) |
| State Representative, HD7 | Fergus Mclean | Independent | Lost to Cedric Ross Hayden | 3,116 (10.51%) |
| State Representative, HD9 | Caddy McKeown | Cross-Nominated Democrat | Defeated Teri Grier | 15,346 (49.81%) |
| State Representative, HD10 | David Gomberg | Cross-Nominated Democrat | Defeated Thomas Donahue | 17,499 (56.24%) |
| State Representative, HD11 | Joe Potwora | Cross-Nominated Republican | Lost to Phil Barnhart | 17,298 (53.12%) |
| State Representative, HD15 | Andy Olson | Cross-Nominated Republican | Defeated Cynthia Hyatt | 25,175 (82.84%) |
| State Representative, HD17 | Jeffrey D Goodwin | Independent | Lost to Sherrie Sprenger | 6,113 (21.10%) |
| State Representative, HD20 | Paul Evans | Cross-Nominated Democrat | Defeated Laura Morett | 17,408 (52.92%) |
| State Representative, HD21 | Alvin Klausen | Independent | Lost to Brian Clem | 1,420 (6.42%) |
| State Representative, HD23 | Jim Thompson | Independent | Lost to Mike Nearman | 12,370 (37.17%) |
| State Representative, HD24 | Ron Noble | Cross-Nominated Republican | Defeated Ken Moore | 17,065 (54.91%) |
| State Representative, HD25 | Bill Post | Cross-Nominated Republican | Defeated Sharon Freeman | 18,545 (63.64%) |
| State Representative, HD26 | Ray Lister | Cross-Nominated Democrat | Lost to Richard Vail | 15,365 (45.02%) |
| State Representative, HD27 | Sheri Malstrom | Cross-Nominated Democrat | uncontested | 22,504 (97.83%) |
| State Representative, HD28 | Jeff Barker | Cross-Nominated Democrat | Defeated Gary Carlson | 17,107 (64.07%) |
| State Representative, HD29 | Susan McLain | Cross-Nominated Democrat | Defeated Juanita Lint | 14,248 (58.95%) |
| State Representative, HD30 | Dan Mason | Cross-Nominated Republican | Lost to Janeen Sollman | 15,336 (52.22%) |
| State Representative, HD31 | Brad Witt | Cross-Nominated Democrat | Defeated Robert Miller | 24,658 (80.55%) |
| State Representative, HD32 | Deborah Boone | Cross-Nominated Democrat | Defeated Bruce Brobek | 18,540 (56.53%) |
| State Representative, HD33 | Mitch Greenlick | Cross Nominated Democrat | Defeated John Verbeek | 24,466 (69.45%) |
| State Representative, HD34 | Donald Herschiser | Independent | Lost to Ken Helm | 9,875 (34.57%) |
| State Representative, HD35 | Jessica Cosineau | Independent | Lost to Margaret Doherty | 11,752 (37.35%) |
| State Representative, HD36 | Jennifer Williamson | Cross-Nominated Democrat | Defeated Amanda Burnham | 28,875 (88.73%) |
| State Representative, HD37 | Julie Parrish | Cross-Nominated Republican | Lost to Paul Southwick | 18,971 (53.81%) |
| State Representative, HD38 | Ann Lininger | Cross Nominated Democrat | Defeated Patrick De Klotz | 26,675 (69.69%) |
| State Representative, HD39 | Bill Kennemer | Cross-Nominated Republican | Defeated Charles Gallia | 22,160 (64.82%) |
| State Representative, HD40 | Mark Meek | Cross-Nominated Democrat | Defeated Evon Tekorius | 16,282 (51.03%) |
| State Representative, HD41 | Karin Power | Cross-Nominated Democrat | Defeated Timothy E. McMenamin | 24,589 (71.35%) |
| State Representative, HD42 | James Stubbs | Independent | Lost to Rob Nosse | 2,459 (6.44%) |
| State Representative, HD43 | Tawna Sanchez | Cross-Nominated Democrat | uncontested | 31,052 (98.55%) |
| State Representative, HD44 | Tina Kotek | Cross-Nominated Democrat | Defeated Joe Roe | 23,288 (80.34%) |
| State Representative, HD45 | Barbara Smith Warner | Cross-Nominated Democrat | uncontested | 24,843 (98.07%) |
| State Representative, HD47 | Michael Langley | Independent | Lost to Diego Hernandez | 7,025 (32.82%) |
| State Representative, HD48 | Jeff Reardon | Cross-Nominated Democrat | Defeated George Yellot | 15,154 (62.92%) |
| State Representative, HD49 | Chris Gorsek | Cross-Nominated Democrat | uncontested | 16,075 (96.50%) |
| State Representative, HD50 | Michael Calcagno | Independent | Lost to Carla Piluso | 4,433 (18.82%) |
| State Representative, HD51 | Lori Chavez-DeRemer | Cross-Nominated Republican | Lost to Janelle Bynum | 13,746 (48.85%) |
| State Representative, HD52 | Mark Johnson | Cross-Nominated Republican | Defeated Mark Reynolds | 17,582 (55.47%) |
| State Representative, HD53 | Gene Whisnant | Cross-Nominated Republican | Defeated Michael Graham | 24,425 (67.45%) |
| State Representative, HD54 | Knute Buehler | Cross-Nominated Republican | Defeated Gena Goodman-Campbell | 19,352 (51.92%) |
| State Representative, HD55 | Mike McLane | Cross-Nominated Republican | Defeated Brie Malarkey | 24,693 (75.68%) |
| State Representative, HD56 | Al Switzer | Cross-Nominated Democrat | Lost to Werner Reschke | 10,882 (40.26%) |
| State Representative, HD57 | Greg Smith | Cross-Nominated Republican | uncontested | 17,432 (98.74%) |
| State Representative, HD58 | Greg Barreto | Cross-Nominated Republican | uncontested | 23,010 (97.29%) |
| State Representative, HD59 | John Huffman | Cross-Nominated Republican | Defeated Tyler Gabriel | 21,392 (70.24%) |
| State Representative, HD60 | Cliff Bentz | Cross-Nominated Republican | uncontested | 22,339 (98.14%) |

== 2018 election ==
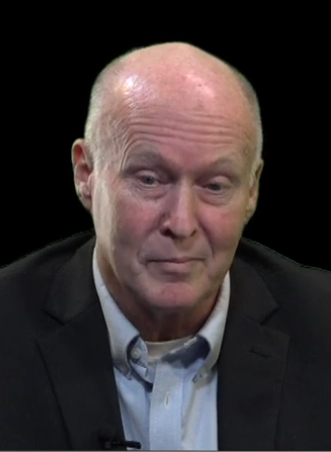
Patrick Starnes

In the 2018 Oregon Gubernatorial Election, the Independent Party nominated freelance cabinet-maker Patrick Starnes despite Democratic incumbent Kate Brown and Republican Knute Buehler making efforts to win the party's cross-nomination. Starnes was elected twice to the Douglas Education Service District, and once to the McKenzie School Board. Co-Chair Rob Harris opposed the nomination, choosing to instead support Knute Buehler. In late October, Starnes dropped out and endorsed Gov. Kate Brown for her re-election, this action was not backed by the party. Despite having ended his campaign, Patrick Starnes received 2.86% of the popular vote in the November election.

Marc Koller, a retired corporate executive and former president of a Service-Disabled Veteran Owned business, ran against Rep. Earl Blumenauer. Koller campaigned on a progressive platform, promoting medicare for all and free college tuition. In the general election as a nominee of the Independent and Pacific Green parties, he received 21,352 votes (over 5%). In addition, investor and truck driver Mark Roberts was nominated as congressional candidate for District 2, running on a message of revitalizing the forest industry and raising wages. Roberts received attention and condemnation from U.S. House Majority Leader Kevin McCarthy for sexual comments he made about First Lady Melania Trump on Twitter. Despite the tweets he made during his campaign, he ended up receiving 4.2% of the vote.

IPO 2018 general election results
| Race | Candidate | Party | Notes | Votes |
|---|---|---|---|---|
| U.S. House of Representatives (CD1) | Suzanne Bonamici | Cross-Nominated Democrat | Defeated John Verbeek | 231,198 (63.6%) |
| U.S. House of Representatives (CD2) | Mark R. Roberts | Independent | Lost to Greg Walden | 15,536 (4.2%) |
| U.S. House of Representatives (CD3) | Marc Koller | Independent | Lost to Earl Blumenauer | 21,352 (5.6%) |
| U.S. House of Representatives (CD4) | Peter DeFazio | Cross-Nominated Democrat | Defeated Art Robinson | 208,710 (56%) |
| U.S. House of Representatives (CD5) | Kurt Schrader | Cross-Nominated Democrat | Defeated Mark Callahan | 197,187 (55%) |
| Oregon Governor | Patrick Starnes | Independent | Lost to Kate Brown | 53,392 (2.86%) |

== 2020 election ==
The Independent Party nominated Joe Biden for 2020 United States Presidential election. However, Biden only had the Democratic Party nomination listed on the ballot.

== See also ==
- List of political parties in Oregon
