= Same-sex marriage in Oregon =

Same-sex marriage has been legally recognized in Oregon since May 19, 2014, when Judge Michael J. McShane of the U.S. District Court for the District Court of Oregon ruled in Geiger v. Kitzhaber that Oregon's 2004 state constitutional amendment banning same-sex marriages discriminated on the basis of sexual orientation in violation of the Equal Protection Clause of the U.S. Constitution. A campaign that was then under way to win voter approval of a constitutional amendment legalizing same-sex marriage was suspended following the decision. Oregon was the seventeenth U.S. state to legalize same-sex marriage. Polling suggests that a large majority of Oregon residents support the legal recognition of same-sex marriage. In July 2015, Governor Kate Brown signed legislation which performed "housekeeping" on various Oregon statutes, codifying same-sex marriage and bringing their wording into line with the court ruling in Geiger.

Previously in March and April 2004, Multnomah County issued marriage licenses to more than 3,000 same-sex couples until ordered by a state judge to stop doing so. In November, Oregon voters approved an amendment to the State Constitution that made it state policy to recognize only marriages "between one man and one woman". The validity of the licenses issued the previous spring was disputed, and the Oregon Supreme Court ruled in April 2005 that the newly adopted constitutional amendment had invalidated them. Oregon began recognizing same-sex marriages from other jurisdictions in October 2013. Domestic partnerships, providing some of the rights and benefits of marriage, have been recognized since 2008.

== Domestic partnerships ==
Following the passage of the state constitutional amendment banning same-sex marriage and the Supreme Court's decision in Li and Kennedy, state officials began efforts to establish domestic partnerships granting virtually all of the rights and benefits of marriage. A bill was first passed in the Oregon State Senate in July 2005, but failed to pass the House of Representatives. Following the 2006 elections, similar legislation was re-introduced and passed both chambers of the Assembly. Governor Ted Kulongoski signed it into law on May 9, 2007. Since February 4, 2008, same-sex couples have had access to domestic partnerships, which guarantee almost all of the rights of marriage.

== Same-sex marriage ==
=== Statutes ===
In July 2015, the Oregon Legislative Assembly performed "housekeeping" on various state statutes, codifying same-sex marriage and bringing their wording into line with the Geiger ruling. The reforms, signed into law by Governor Kate Brown, made all mentions to marriage gender-neutral, and came into effect on January 1, 2016. In 2016, the Assembly passed legislation defining marriage as "a union between two people" irrespective of gender. It passed the House in a 43–13 vote on February 5, and the Senate in an 18–11 vote on February 25.

February 5, 2016 vote in the House of Representatives
| Political affiliation | Voted for | Voted against | Absent (Did not vote) |
|---|---|---|---|
| Democratic Party | 34: Jeff Barker; Phil Barnhart; Brent Barton; Deborah Boone; Brian Clem; Margaret Doherty; Paul Evans; Shemia Fagan; Lew Frederick; Joe Gallegos; David Gomberg; Chris Gorsek; Mitch Greenlick; Ken Helm; Paul Holvey; Val Hoyle; Alissa Keny-Guyer; Betty Komp; Tina Kotek; Ann Lininger; John Lively; Caddy McKeown; Susan McLain; Nancy Nathanson; Rob Nosse; Carla Piluso; Dan Rayfield; Tobias Read; Jeff Reardon; Barbara Smith Warner; Kathleen Taylor; Jessica Vega Pederson; Jennifer Williamson; Brad Witt | – | 1: Peter J. Buckley |
| Republican Party | 9: Cliff Bentz; John Davis; Sal Esquivel; Cedric Ross Hayden; Mark Johnson; Bill Kennemer; Mike McLane; Julie Parrish; Greg Smith | 13: Greg Barreto; Vic Gilliam; Jodi Hack; Dallas Heard; John Huffman; Mike Nearman; Bill Post; Sherrie Sprenger; Duane Stark; Jim Weidner; Gene Whisnant; Gail Whitsett; Carl Wilson | 3: Knute Buehler; Wayne Krieger; Andy Olson |
| Total | 44 | 13 | 4 |
| Total | 73.3% | 21.7% | 6.7% |

February 25, 2016 vote in the Senate
| Political affiliation | Voted for | Voted against | Absent (Did not vote) |
|---|---|---|---|
| Democratic Party | 18: Alan Bates; Lee Beyer; Ginny Burdick; Peter Courtney; Michael Dembrow; Richard Devlin; Chris Edwards; Sara Gelser Blouin; Mark Hass; Betsy Johnson; Laurie Monnes Anderson; Rod Monroe; Floyd Prozanski; Chuck Riley; Arnie Roblan; Diane Rosenbaum; Chip Shields; Elizabeth Steiner | – | – |
| Republican Party | – | 11: Herman Baertschiger Jr.; Brian Boquist; Ted Ferrioli; Fred Girod; Bill Hansell; Tim Knopp; Jeff Kruse; Alan Olsen; Kim Thatcher; Chuck Thomsen; Doug Whitsett | 1: Jackie Winters |
| Total | 18 | 11 | 1 |
| Total | 60.0% | 36.7% | 3.3% |

On March 14, 2016, Governor Brown signed the bill into law, and it took effect immediately. The statutory definition of marriage is now: "Marriage is a civil contract entered into in person by males at least 17 years of age and females at least 17 years of age, who are otherwise capable, and solemnized in accordance with ORS 106.150." Oregon's statutes were also amended to read the following:

Any privilege, immunity, right or benefit granted by statute, administrative or court rule, policy, common law or any other law to an individual because the individual is or was married to an individual of a different sex, is granted on equivalent terms, substantive and procedural, to an individual who is or was married to an individual of the same sex. [ORS 106.345 (3)]

=== Constitutional amendment ===
Same-sex marriage in the United States

On May 21, 2004, the Defense of Marriage Coalition received approval for the language of a proposed initiative to prohibit same-sex marriage. It began circulating petitions to obtain the 100,840 valid signatures needed by July 2 to place the initiative on the November ballot. On November 2, 2004, voters approved Ballot Measure 36, a constitutional amendment defining the marriage of "a man and a woman" as the only one recognized by the state, by a margin of 57% to 43%. The Defense of Marriage Coalition said that opponents of Measure 36 had outspent their group more than 2 to 1. The now-defunct amendment read: "It is the policy of Oregon, and its political subdivisions, that only a marriage between one man and one woman shall be valid or legally recognized as a marriage."

In February 2013, Basic Rights Oregon formed the group Oregon United for Marriage to put an initiative legalizing same-sex marriage on the November 2014 ballot. The initiative would have replaced the state's constitutional amendment restricting marriage to opposite-sex couples with provisions guaranteeing the right of all persons to marry without respect to gender. On July 26, 2013, the petition campaign to collect the required signatures was launched. By early December 2013, the 116,284 minimum required signatures had been reached, but signature collection continued. The campaign was endorsed by the Democratic Party of Oregon, and various major businesses. The campaign gathered more than 160,000 signatures, enough to place its proposal, the Oregon Same-Sex Marriage Amendment, on the November 4, 2014 statewide ballot. Following the May 2014 U.S. district court decision in Geiger v. Kitzhaber striking down Oregon's ban on same-sex marriage, the group announced that it was "confident that the freedom to marry [was] secure in Oregon" and that it would not proceed with the measure.

In April 2023, Senate Majority Leader Kate Lieber introduced a constitutional amendment guaranteeing a right to same-sex marriage, abortion and gender-affirming care to the Oregon Senate. On April 27, 2023, the Committee on Rules adopted the amendment by a vote of 3–2. On May 2, 2023, senators Tim Knopp and Bill Hansell recommended that the measure be modified to simply repeal the constitutional ban on same-sex marriage rather than instate language guaranteeing a right to marry. On June 15, 2023, Republicans announced that, as part of a deal with Democrats to end their six-week walkout, Democrats had agreed to table the amendment. That same day, the Senate adopted a motion by a vote of 22–0 to re-refer the proposal to the Committee on Rules. The legislation ultimately died in committee when the Senate adjourned sine die on June 25, 2023. In June 2024, Basic Rights Oregon announced its intention to collect signatures for a ballot initiative repealing the ban. The campaign had to collect 156,231 valid signatures by July 2, 2026 to qualify for the November 2026 ballot. In February, the group announced it would end its campaign without giving an official explanation.

=== Marriage licenses issued in Multnomah County ===
On March 3, 2004, Multnomah County began issuing marriage licenses to same-sex couples after its attorney issued a legal opinion that such marriages were lawful. On that day, Multnomah County issued 422 marriage licenses, compared to the 68 it issued on an average day. Local businesses reported an increase in the sales of flowers and other marriage-related services directly related to the beginning of same-sex marriages. Neighboring Washington and Clackamas counties announced that they were studying Multnomah County's legal opinion, but did not plan to immediately follow suit. At a hearing on March 9, 2004, after the county had issued approximately 1,700 marriage licenses to same-sex couples, County Circuit Judge Dale Koch refused to issue an injunction to stop the county from continuing the process. A later study by The Oregonian showed that out the approximately 1,700 same-sex couples married in the first week, 2,026 spouses were from Multnomah County, while about 900 others came from other locations in Oregon, about 490 from the state of Washington, and 30 from other states. On March 10, 2004, the Oregon Legislative Counsel, Greg Chaimov, issued an opinion that "state law requires a county clerk to license the marriage of a same-sex couple." The office of Attorney General Hardy Myers issued an opinion on March 12, 2004, after reviewing it with Governor Ted Kulongoski, that concluded that Oregon law prohibits county clerks from issuing marriage licenses to same-sex couples; that the Oregon Supreme Court would likely find denying such licenses violates Article I, Section 20 of the Oregon Constitution; but that current state practices should not change in anticipation of such a ruling. It also said that the Attorney General's office lacked the authority to order Multnomah County to cease issuing licenses for same-sex marriages.

On March 15, 2004, Multnomah County commissioners announced that they would continue to issue licenses to same-sex couples. On March 16, following public hearings, Benton County commissioners voted 2–1 to begin issuing marriage licenses to same-sex couples on March 24, but reversed their decision on March 22 after receiving two letters from the Attorney General and a phone call threatening the arrest of the county clerk, and decided to issue no marriage license at all pending a decision by the Multnomah County Court.

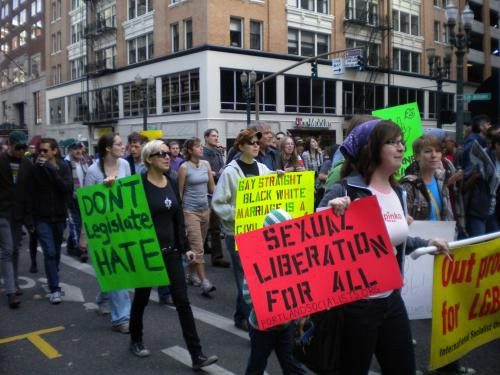
About 200 people staging a pro-LGBT protest in downtown Portland to advocate for the legalization of same-sex marriage, October 2009

With the consent of the state, three same-sex couples sued the state of Oregon in Multnomah County Court, including Mary Li and Rebecca Kennedy, the first same-sex couple to receive a marriage license from Multnomah County. At a hearing before Judge Frank Bearden on April 16, 2004, in Li and Kennedy v. State of Oregon, the American Civil Liberties Union (ACLU) and Basic Rights Oregon represented the plaintiffs and the Oregon Department of Justice and the Defense of Marriage Coalition defended the state's position. On April 20, 2004, Bearden ordered the county to stop issuing marriage licenses to same-sex couples, and ordered the state to recognize the 3,022 marriage licenses already issued. The state had been holding the completed licenses pending a court decision as to their validity, rather than entering them into the records system. Bearden also found that the Oregon Constitution would likely allow some form of marriage rights to same-sex couples, and directed the Legislative Assembly to act on the issue within 90 days of the start of its next session. He ruled that if the Assembly failed to address the issue within that time, he would allow Multnomah County to resume issuing marriage licenses to same-sex couples. It was understood that both parties would appeal the decision. In July 2004, the Court of Appeals lifted the temporary ban blocking the registration of the marriage licenses issued by Multnomah County. The state announced that processing would take a week and began doing so within hours of the court's action.

On December 15, 2004, the Oregon Supreme Court heard arguments in the appeal of Li and Kennedy. Oregon argued that Multnomah County lacked the authority to issue same-sex marriage licenses and that Ballot Measure 36, the 2004 ballot initiative banning same-sex marriage, was retroactive, making the issue of those licenses moot. The Defense of Marriage Coalition argued that Measure 36 was not retroactive, there had been no constitutional violation of the rights of same-sex couples, and Multnomah County did not have the authority to issue licenses even to remedy a constitutional violation. The ACLU argued that Measure 36 was not retroactive, that the rights of same-sex couples under the Equal Privileges and Immunities Clause of the Oregon Constitution had been violated, and that counties were required to remedy perceived constitutional violations. On April 14, 2005, the Oregon Supreme Court decided Li and Kennedy, ruling that Multnomah County lacked the authority to remedy a perceived violation of the Oregon Constitution and that all marriage licenses issued to same-sex couples were void when issued. The court noted that the Oregon Constitution had since been amended to limit marriage to opposite-sex couples and it therefore declined to rule as to whether or not same-sex couples had any rights under the Equal Privileges and Immunities Clause of the Oregon Constitution.

=== Recognition of out-of-state same-sex marriages ===
On October 16, 2013, based on an opinion from the Oregon Department of Justice, the state's Chief Operating Officer, Michael Jordan, announced that Oregon would begin recognizing same-sex marriages from other jurisdictions "for the purposes of administering state programs."

=== Lawsuit ===
On October 15, 2013, two couples, an unmarried lesbian couple and two men already married in Canada, filed a lawsuit, Geiger v. Kitzhaber, in U.S. district court in Eugene, challenging the Oregon Constitution's ban on same-sex marriage. This made Oregon the 20th U.S. state to have a federal lawsuit challenging its ban on same-sex marriage filed since the U.S. Supreme Court's decision in United States v. Windsor in June 2013 invalidated part of the Defense of Marriage Act (DOMA). Two more couples and the Basic Rights Education Fund filed another same-sex marriage case on December 19, 2013, with this latter case captioned Rummell and West v. Kitzhaber.

On January 22, 2014, Judge Michael J. McShane consolidated the two lawsuits and scheduled oral arguments for April 23. On February 20, Attorney General Ellen Rosenblum told the court that she believed "that performing same-sex marriages in Oregon would have no adverse effect on existing marriages, and that sexual orientation does not determine an individual's capacity to establish a loving and enduring relationship." She found it impossible to defend the state's ban "under any standard of review" and her office would no longer defend the ban in court. The plaintiffs in Geiger filed motions asking for summary judgment; this procedure used in cases where there are no material issues of fact requiring a trial, and a fast resolution is desired. The court heard oral arguments on motions for summary judgment in the consolidated lawsuit on April 23, 2014. While all parties present supported same-sex couples' right to marry, Judge McShane questioned whether Oregon voters should get another say on the issue, since they approved the amendment defining marriage; and whether to stay the ruling and await guidance from same-sex marriage cases pending in the U.S. courts of appeal, or to implement the ruling immediately. The court scheduled another oral argument session for May 14, where the National Organization for Marriage (NOM), an organization that opposes same-sex marriage, tried to qualify for intervenor status in the case. On May 14, Judge McShane rejected NOM's attempt to intervene in the case, ruling that the group was unreasonably late in filing its request and that it had failed to convincingly demonstrate that it should be allowed to intervene on behalf of three anonymous Oregon-based members of NOM.

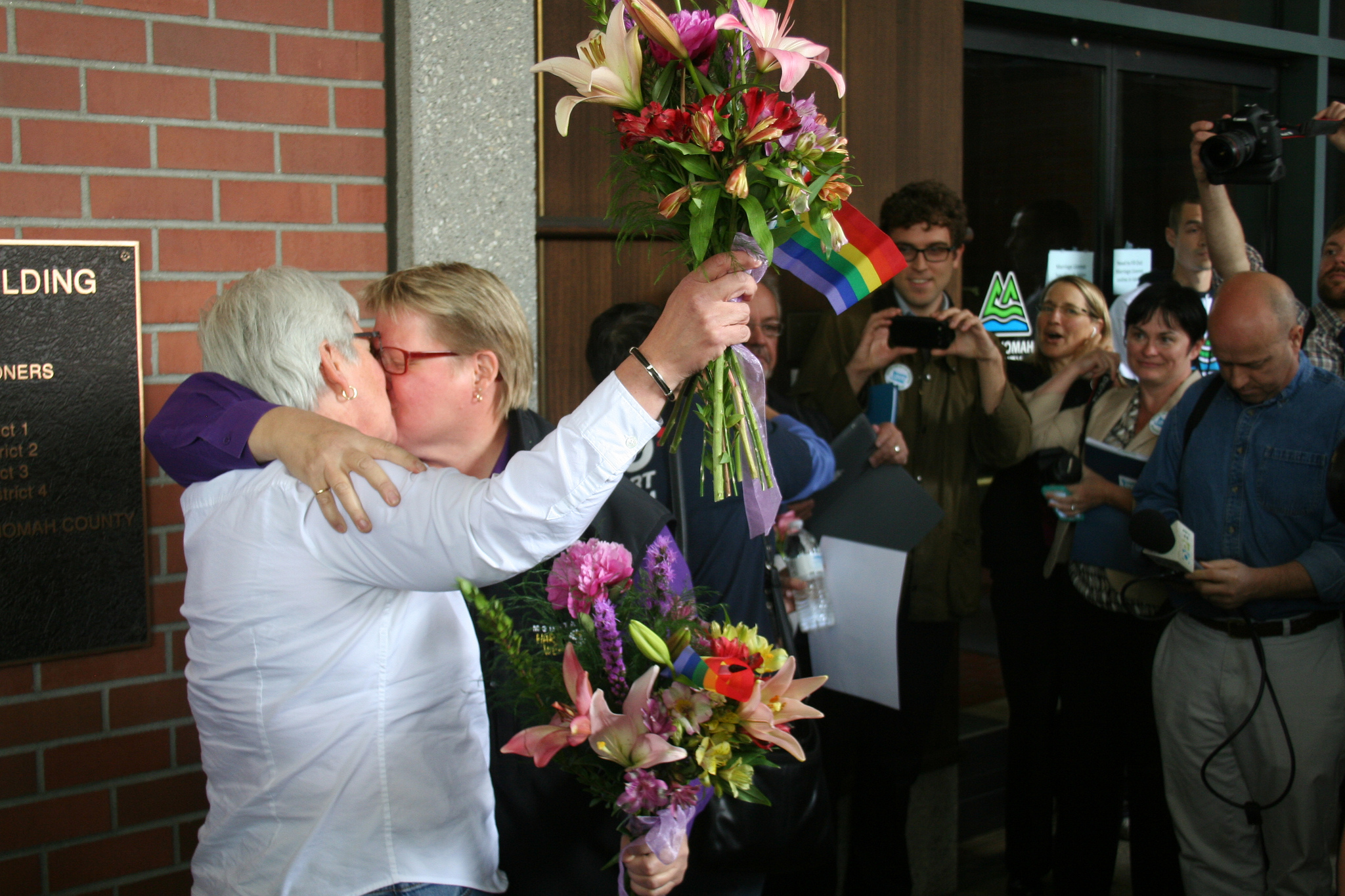
Marriage plaintiffs Deanna Geiger and Janine Nelson hearing the news that they won their case for same-sex marriage in Oregon, May 19, 2014

At noon on May 19, 2014, Judge McShane issued his opinion, ruling that the state's ban was unconstitutional. He wrote:

Because Oregon's marriage laws discriminate on the basis of sexual orientation without a rational relationship to any legitimate government interest, the laws violate the Equal Protection Clause of the Fourteenth Amendment to the United States Constitution.

Minutes after the decision was announced at noon, officials in at least four counties were fulfilling requests for marriage licenses from same-sex couples. The first to wed in Multnomah County were two of the plaintiffs, Deanna Geiger and Janine Nelson. The county issued 96 licenses the first day, and judges officiated at wedding ceremonies in a Portland ballroom. Governor John Kitzhaber, the named defendant, said "I strongly support Judge McShane's decision to overturn institutional discrimination in Oregon's constitution. No longer will Oregonians tolerate discrimination against the gay, lesbian, and transgender community. [...] Now, finally, all Oregonians will have the opportunity to make a legal commitment to the person they love. Every person and every family in Oregon deserves that chance. Today is a win for love, for families, and for freedom." Senator Jeff Merkley called it "a historic day for Oregon", and Senator Ron Wyden said, "Judge Michael McShane's decision marks a significant moment in Oregon's civil rights history, and it's an important step toward equal rights for all Americans. Every American deserves the freedom to marry the person they love, and, starting today, all Oregonians will have that choice. I am proud to have stood with Oregon's same-sex couples in this struggle for marriage equality for nearly 20 years, and it's important to keep pushing until that right extends to all Americans." The Republican House Minority Leader, Mike McLane, issued a statement, "For those that believe marriage is a religious covenant, the origin of which predates America, today's federal court ruling won't change that. For those that believe marriage is a legal union between two people that is recognized and enforced by our state government, today's ruling is a logical extension of the Supreme Court's ruling last summer. Our society must embrace both views. My hope is that the process of reconciliation in Oregon will continue as we move forward with respect for each other." Val Hoyle, the Majority Leader of the House, said "I married the person who I love over 22 years ago, and I'm thrilled that all Oregonians now have the freedom to do the same."

NOM immediately asked the Ninth Circuit Court of Appeals to issue an emergency stay of McShane's ruling, which that court denied on grounds of lack of standing. NOM then filed a request on May 27 with Supreme Court Justice Anthony Kennedy seeking to block Judge McShane's order. Justice Kennedy referred the matter to the entire Supreme Court, which on June 4 rejected NOM's request.

=== Native American nations ===
The Indian Civil Rights Act primarily aims to protect the rights of Native Americans but also reinforces the principle of tribal self-governance. While it does not grant sovereignty, the Act affirms the authority of tribes to govern their own legal affairs. Consequently, many tribes in Oregon have enacted their own marriage and family laws. As a result, the Geiger ruling and the Supreme Court's Obergefell v. Hodges ruling did not automatically apply to tribal jurisdictions. Same-sex marriage is legal on the reservations of the Confederated Tribes of Coos, Lower Umpqua and Siuslaw Indians, the Confederated Tribes of Siletz Indians, the Confederated Tribes of the Grand Ronde Community of Oregon, the Coquille Indian Tribe, and the Fort McDermitt Paiute and Shoshone Tribe. The Coquille Indian Tribe was the first tribe in Oregon, and the United States, to legalize same-sex marriage, when its Tribal Council voted 5–2 in 2008 to allow same-sex couples to marry on tribal land. The law went into effect on May 20, 2009. At least one of the parties to the marriage must be a member of the tribe. Kitzen and Jeni Branting were the first same-sex couple to marry on Coquille sovereign land in Coos Bay on May 24. Kitzen Branting said, "My tribe recognizes the marriage, so that is really important to me. Anytime we come to a tribal function, I know my marriage is just as valid as anyone else's marriage." At the time, Oregon did not recognize same-sex marriage, but the tribe, as a federally recognized sovereign nation, was not bound by the Oregon Constitution. The Tribal Council of the Confederated Tribes of Coos, Lower Umpqua and Siuslaw Indians voted 6–0 to legalize same-sex marriage on August 10, 2014, and the Tribal Council of the Confederated Tribes of Siletz Indians approved a marriage ordinance permitting same-sex couples to marry on May 15, 2015. (Note: The ordinance defines marriage as "a formal and express civil contract entered into between two persons, who are at least 18 years of age, who are otherwise capable of entering a marriage, and at least one of whom is a member of the Confederated Tribes of Siletz Indians." Previously, the Siletz Tribal Code did not recognize same-sex marriages, but also did not explicitly define marriage as being exclusively between "a man and a woman" (Alsea: łimkwaʼstəxłtʼənú·t; Coos: humsíniiwas; Miluk: huumsínnu; Molala: yałam nuay naŋiłay; Siuslaw: təxmú·ni qayú·tsʼtswax; Tolowa: chʼeeseeneʼ trʼaaneʼ).) The Tribal Council of the Confederated Tribes of the Grand Ronde Community passed a same-sex marriage law on October 28, 2015, and it went into effect on November 18. The Law and Order Code of the Fort McDermitt Paiute and Shoshone Tribe states that marriage is governed by state law rather than tribal law. As such, same-sex marriage is legal on the reservation of the tribe, which Oregon shares with Nevada near the community of McDermitt.

Native Americans have deep-rooted marriage traditions, placing a strong emphasis on community, family and spiritual connections. While there are no records of same-sex marriages being performed in Native American cultures in the way they are commonly defined in Western legal systems, many Indigenous communities recognize identities and relationships that may be placed on the LGBT spectrum. Among these are two-spirit individuals—people who embody both masculine and feminine qualities. In some cultures, two-spirit individuals assigned male at birth wear women's clothing and engage in household and artistic work associated with the feminine sphere. Historically, this identity sometimes allowed for unions between two people of the same biological sex. The Northern Paiute refer to two-spirit individuals as tudayapi (pronounced [tɨˈɾajapai]). They were allowed to marry either men or women. Other nations also have distinct terms and respected roles for two-spirit people. The Sahaptin refer to them as wáƛ̓uks (pronounced [wátɬʼuks]), the Takelma as swayàu, and the Klamath as tʼwiniˑqʼ (pronounced [ˈt’wɪniːq’]). The tʼwiniˑqʼ wear women's clothing and "behave as women". They married cisgender men, usually took the role of a shaman (qyoɢ) and were credited with great spirit power. In Chinook Jargon, they are known as burdash. This term originated from the French word bardache, which entered English as berdache, a term for two-spirit which is now dated and considered offensive.

=== Economic impact ===
An April 2014 study by the Williams Institute at the University of California, Los Angeles found that allowing same-sex marriage would add $47.3 million to Oregon's economy during the first three years. The study estimated that allowing same-sex marriage would also add 468 new jobs to the state economy.

=== Marriage statistics ===
The following table shows the number of same-sex marriages performed in Oregon according to the Oregon Center for Health Statistics. Most marriages are performed in Multnomah, Washington and Lane counties; Multnomah accounting for approximately 39% of the state's same-sex marriages by the end of 2019. Wheeler County was the last county in Oregon to perform a same-sex marriage, with its first one taking place in 2022. The first same-sex marriage in Gilliam County was performed in 2020. In 2014 and 2015, lesbian couples accounted for the majority of same-sex marriages; 68% in 2014 and 64% the following year. The 2020 U.S. census showed that there were 11,948 married same-sex couple households (4,725 male couples and 7,223 female couples) and 9,058 unmarried same-sex couple households in Oregon.

Number of marriages performed in Oregon
| Year | Same-sex marriages | Opposite-sex marriages | Total marriages | % same-sex |
|---|---|---|---|---|
| 2014 (Note: since May) | 2,027 | 20,483 | 22,510 | 9.00% |
| 2015 | 1,704 | 26,090 | 27,794 | 6.13% |
| 2016 | 1,901 | 26,122 | 28,023 | 6.78% |
| 2017 | 1,547 | 26,057 | 27,604 | 5.60% |
| 2018 | 1,233 | 25,268 | 26,501 | 4.65% |
| 2019 | 1,096 | 24,179 | 25,275 | 4.34% |
| 2020 | 1,032 | 20,524 | 21,556 | 4.79% |
| 2021 | 1,011 | 23,069 | 24,080 | 4.20% |
| 2022 | 1,264 | 24,382 | 25,646 | 4.93% |
| 2023 | 1,110 | 22,998 | 24,108 | 4.60% |
| 2024 | 1,236 | 23,822 | 25,058 | 4.93% |
| 2025 | 1,489 | 24,460 | 25,949 | 5.74% |

== Public opinion ==
Public opinion for same-sex marriage in Oregon
| Poll source | Dates administered | Sample size | Margin of error | Support | Opposition | Do not know / refused |
|---|---|---|---|---|---|---|
| Public Religion Research Institute | February 28 – December 8, 2025 | 564 adults | ? | 69% | 29% | 2% |
| Public Religion Research Institute | March 13 – December 2, 2024 | 285 adults | ? | 74% | 24% | 2% |
| Public Religion Research Institute | March 9 – December 7, 2023 | 312 adults | ? | 75% | 23% | 2% |
| Public Religion Research Institute | March 11 – December 14, 2022 | ? | ? | 78% | 22% | <0.5% |
| Public Religion Research Institute | March 8 – November 9, 2021 | ? | ? | 73% | 26% | 1% |
| Public Religion Research Institute | January 7 – December 20, 2020 | 839 adults | ? | 73% | 20% | 7% |
| Public Religion Research Institute | April 5 – December 23, 2017 | 1,130 adults | ? | 67% | 25% | 8% |
| Public Religion Research Institute | May 18, 2016 – January 10, 2017 | 1,648 adults | ? | 65% | 26% | 9% |
| Public Religion Research Institute | April 29, 2015 – January 7, 2016 | 1,296 adults | ? | 62% | 29% | 9% |
| Public Religion Research Institute | April 2, 2014 – January 4, 2015 | 742 adults | ? | 63% | 30% | 7% |
| Public Policy Polling | May 22–27, 2014 | 956 registered voters | ± 3.2% | 54% | 40% | 6% |
| DHM Research | April 30 – May 2, 2014 | 400 registered voters | ± 4.9% | 58% | 36% | 6% |
| DHM Research | April 25–28, 2013 | 500 voters | ± 4.4% | 49% | 42% | 9% |
| Public Policy Polling | December 3–5, 2012 | 614 voters | ± 4.0% | 54% | 40% | 6% |
| Public Policy Polling | June 21–24, 2012 | 686 voters | ± 3.7% | 46% | 45% | 9% |
| Public Policy Polling | June 19–21, 2011 | 701 voters | ± 3.7% | 48% | 42% | 10% |

The June 2011 Public Policy Polling (PPP) survey found that 48% of Oregon voters thought marriage for same-sex couples should be legal, while 42% thought it should be illegal and 10% were not sure. A separate question on the same survey found that 76% of Oregon voters supported the legal recognition of same-sex couples, with 43% supporting same-sex marriage, 33% supporting civil unions but not marriage, 22% favoring no legal recognition and 1% being undecided. The June 2012 PPP survey found that 46% of Oregon voters thought same-sex marriage should be legal, while 45% thought it should be illegal and 9% were not sure. A separate question on the same survey found that 74% of Oregon voters supported the legal recognition of same-sex couples, with 44% supporting same-sex marriage, 30% supporting civil unions but not marriage, 23% favoring no legal recognition and 3% being undecided.

== See also ==
- Domestic partnership in Oregon
- LGBT rights in Oregon
- Same-sex marriage in the United States
