= Oregon's 22nd Senate district =

American legislative district

Oregon's 22nd Senate District as of September 27, 2021

District 22 of the Oregon State Senate comprises parts of north and northeast Portland. The district is composed of Oregon House districts 43 and 44. It is currently represented by Democrat Lew Frederick of Portland.

== Election results ==
District boundaries have changed over time. Therefore, senators before 2021 may not represent the same constituency as today. From 1993 until 2003, the district covered parts of Lane and Douglas counties; from 2003 until 2013, it shifted to cover north and northeast Portland; and from 2013 until 2023, it remained mostly unchanged, losing area in Sullivan's Gulch while gaining land bounded by NE 148th Avenue and railroad tracks running along NE Killingsworth St and NE Sandy Avenue.

The current district undoes those gains and losses from the previous iteration while simultaneously adding much of the Alameda and Cully neighborhoods and losing the Sumner neighborhood.

The results are as follows:

Year	Candidate	Party	Percent	Opponent	Party	Percent
1982	Bill Frye	Democratic	58.2%	Jonathan Bates	Republican	41.8%
1986	Bill Frye	Democratic	67.3%	Robert James O'Reilly	Republican	32.7%
1988	Peggy Jolin	Democratic	100.0%	Unopposed		
1990	Peggy Jolin	Democratic	66.7%	Paul S. Holbo	Republican	33.3%
1994	Bob Kintigh	Republican	53.0%	Karsten Rasmussen	Democratic	47.0%
1998	Tony Corcoran	Democratic	51.9%	Cedric Lee Hayden	Republican	48.1%
2004	Margaret Carter	Democratic	97.4%	Unopposed		
2008	Margaret Carter	Democratic	98.2%	Unopposed		
2010 (Note: Off-cycle election due to the resignation of Margaret Carter in 2009 to take a position at the Oregon Department of Human Services. Chip Shields was the incumbent in this election, as he had previously been appointed to the open seat.)	Chip Shields	Democratic	87.9%	Dwayne E. Runyan	Republican	11.8%
2012	Chip Shields	Democratic	91.6%	Herb Booth	Libertarian	7.8%
2016	Lew Frederick	Democratic	92.0%	Unopposed		
2020	Lew Frederick	Democratic	98.05%	Unopposed		
2024	Lew Frederick	Democratic	90.5%	Michael Saperstein	Republican	9.3%
