= JVC (disambiguation) =

JVC is a Japanese consumer electronics company.

JVC may also refer to:

- JVC Broadcasting, a private company and radio stations owner in New York
- Jesuit Volunteer Corps, an organization of lay volunteers
- JVC Cuijk, a Dutch association football club
- JVCKenwood, a company formed from the merger of JVC and Kenwood Corporation
- JVCKenwood Victor Entertainment, a subsidiary of JVC
