= Long Wharf Theatre =

Nonprofit institution in New Haven, Connecticut

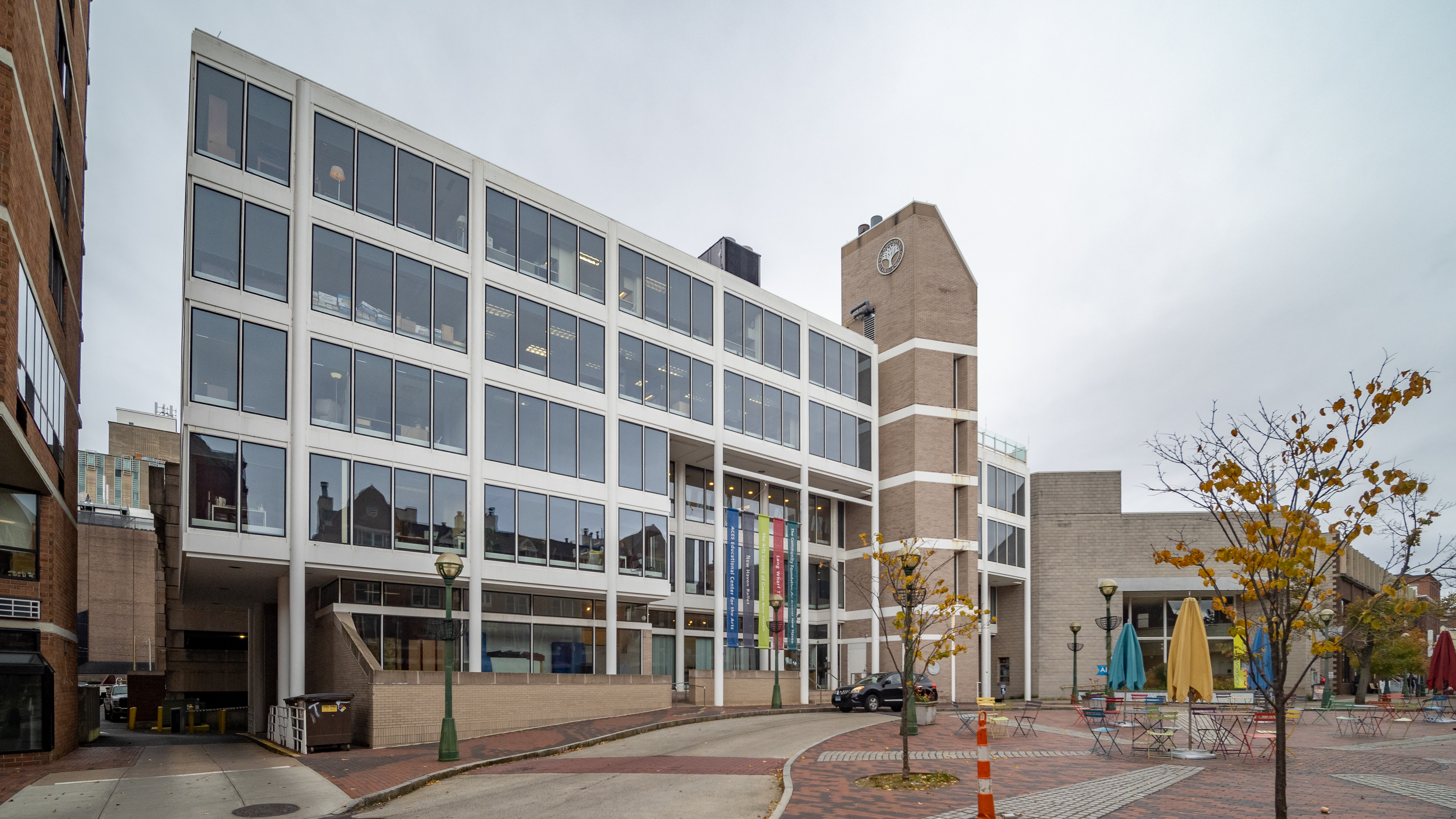
- Interactive map of Long Wharf Theatre
- Address: 222 Sargent Drive; New Haven, Connecticut; United States
- Coordinates: 41°17′38.82″N 72°55′21.63″W
- Type: Regional theatre

Construction
- Opened: 1965

Website
- www.longwharf.org

Long Wharf Theatre is a nonprofit institution in New Haven, Connecticut, a pioneer in the not-for-profit regional theatre movement, the originator of several prominent plays, and a venue where many internationally known actors have appeared.

Founded in 1965, the theatre is committed to the creation of new works and the reexamination of classic plays. It is currently led by Artistic Director Jacob G. Padrón and Managing Director Kit Ingui.

The theatre has staged world premieres by Samuel D. Hunter, Craig Lucas, Steve Martin, Paula Vogel, Athol Fugard, and Anna Deavere Smith, among others. In addition, some of the nation's leading actors, including Sam Waterston, Stacy Keach, Brian Dennehy, Al Pacino, Karen Allen, Colleen Dewhurst, Judith Ivey, Jane Alexander, Reg E. Cathey, and Mary McDonnell have performed on one of the theatre's two stages.

In 2022, Long Wharf announced plans to leave its longtime venue and become an itinerant New Haven theater company.

== History ==
Long Wharf Theatre was founded by Jon Jory, Harlan Kleiman, Ruth Lord, Betty Kubler, and Newt Schenck in 1965 when Arthur Miller's The Crucible opened for a two-week engagement. Named after the Long Wharf in New Haven Harbor, the theatre was built in a vacant warehouse in a food terminal. The main stage seats were borrowed from a defunct movie house. The budget for the first year was $294,000, when more than 30,000 tickets were sold.

Arvin Brown and Edgar Rosenblum led the theater for the next three decades. Doug Hughes later succeeded Brown as artistic director for four seasons. Gordon Edelstein, previously the artistic director of ACT Theatre in Seattle for five years, became Long Wharf's artistic director on July 1, 2002; he had been Long Wharf's associate artistic director intermittently before. Gordon Edelstein was fired by Long Wharf's board in January 2018 because of accusations of sexual misconduct. After a search process, Jacob G. Padrón became the new artistic director in November 2018. Joan Channick was managing director from 2006 to 2009. Ray Cullom succeeded her as managing director for two seasons, and restored fiscal stability after several years of severe shortfalls. Joshua Borenstein took over in 2011 and Kit Ingui replaced him in 2019.

More than 30 Long Wharf productions have been transferred to Broadway or Off-Broadway, including Durango, Wit (winner of a Pulitzer Prize), The Shadow Box (Pulitzer Prize and Tony Award/Best Play winner), Hughie, American Buffalo, Requiem for a Heavyweight, Quartermaine's Terms (Obie Award Winner for Best Play), The Gin Game (Pulitzer Prize winner), The Changing Room, The Contractor, I Love You, You're Perfect, Now Change, Satchmo at the Waldorf, and Streamers.

== Current operations ==
The theatre has generally produced a season of six plays on two stages, as well as programs for new play workshops, community engagement events, and in-school and at-theatre programming for middle and high school students.

In 2022, Long Wharf declared plans to move out of its theater and become an itinerant theater company performing in different venues around New Haven. Its former site was rented by a store selling cannabis.

=== Awards ===
Long Wharf Theatre has received awards from the New York Drama Critics' Circle, Obie Awards, the Margo Jefferson Award for Production of New Works, a special citation from the Outer Critics Circle and, in 1978, the Tony Award for Outstanding Regional Theatre.
