= William F. Frye =

American lawyer

Bill Frye

Member of the Oregon Senate from the 22nd district
- In office January 10, 1983 – July 17, 1988
- Preceded by: Ted Kulongoski
- Succeeded by: Peggy Jolin

Personal details
- Born: William Frank Frye; April 11, 1929 Salem, Oregon, U.S.
- Died: July 17, 1988 (aged 59) Eugene, Oregon
- Cause of death: Melanoma
- Party: Democratic
- Spouses: Helen J. Frye (m. 1952; div. 1975); Laurie Smith (m. 1978; div. 1987)
- Children: Eric; Karen; Heidi; Margo
- Education: University of Oregon (1953); University of Oregon School of Law (1956)
- Occupation: Trial lawyer, politician

William F. Frye (April 11, 1929 – July 17, 1988) was an American trial lawyer and politician from the state of Oregon. He was elected District Attorney of Lane County in 1958 at the age of 29 and was one of the nation's first public prosecutors to routinely charge drunk drivers involved in fatal accidents with negligent homicide.

== Early life ==
Bill Frye was born in Salem, Oregon to school teacher Ethel (Ives) and attorney Stanley Frye. He was raised along with two younger sisters in Portland and graduated from Parkrose High School in 1946. After joining the US Army Air Forces he was honorably discharged three years later. In 1949 he entered the University of Oregon where he majored in journalism and joined the fraternity Phi Kappa Psi. It was during his sophomore year while serving as class treasurer that he met Helen Jackson who was then student body vice-president. They married a year later. Upon receiving his bachelor's degree in 1953, Frye enrolled in the university's school of law and graduated in 1956.

== Professional career ==
Frye was elected District Attorney of Lane County only two years removed from law school. During his first term in office he served as president of the Oregon District Attorneys Association as well as vice president of the National District Attorneys Association. In 1963 he received the first Distinguished Service Award from the National District Attorneys Association and a year later was named a delegate to the Democratic National Convention. In 1966 he resigned from office and ran for congress but lost in the primary. Over the next sixteen years he was in private practice. Frye was elected to the Oregon State Legislature in 1982. He was reelected in 1986 and served as chairman of the Judiciary Committee as well as being named Senate President pro tempore.

== Highlights ==
Early in his first term as district attorney, and some twenty years before Mothers Against Drunk Driving was founded, Frye sought to prosecute drunk drivers for their culpability in traffic fatalities. He was one of the nation's first public prosecutors to vigorously seek criminal charges, trying twelve cases of negligent homicide and garnering eleven convictions in five years.

Frye was also an early advocate of using the law to go after fathers for non-payment of child support, creating a program that "seeks out husbands delinquent in support of wives and children, getting them to pay financial support as required by law."

On July 6, 1965, Deputy Carlton Smith was killed on his first night of patrol. While making a routine traffic stop, he was shot by Carl Bowles and Wilford Gray, both escaped convicts. Frye personally tired the case and sent both men back to prison for life. In 1974, Bowles escaped while on a conjugal visit and was later discovered in Eugene. After a shootout with the FBI, he kidnapped an elderly couple and disappeared, killing them both the next day. He was shot and captured near Coeur d'Alene, Idaho, after a standoff with police. Bowles later became one of the subjects of a book by author Pete Earley titled The Hot House: Life Inside Leavenworth Prison.

== Controversy ==
In 1966 Annette Buchanan was editor of the University of Oregon's student newspaper the Daily Emerald when she wrote an article about marijuana use on campus. She later refused Frye's order to testify before a grand jury and reveal her sources. A judge found her guilty of contempt and fined her $300. Her appeal was denied by the Oregon Supreme Court, but her actions are generally credited with pushing the legislature to pass the state's shield law in 1973.

== Death ==
In 1985 Frye was diagnosed with cancer. He sought treatment over the next three years even as he continued to serve in the legislature and practice law. He died on July 17, 1988.
