= Jacob Padrón =

American artistic director

- Education: Loyola Marymount University
- Occupation: Artistic director

Jacob Padrón is the artistic director of Long Wharf Theatre. He is also the Artistic Director of The Sol Project and a co-founder of the Artists' Anti-Racism Coalition.

== Early life ==
Jacob Padrón was raised in Gilroy, California. He is Mexican-American. During his youth he attended a production of "La Virgen del Tepeyac" put on by El Teatro Campesino. He soon joined the company and was a member through his teenage years. After graduating college Padrón volunteered with the Jesuit Volunteer Corps, providing support for those living with HIV/AIDS.

=== Education ===
Padrón attended Loyola Marymount University in Los Angeles. He studied theater and communications. He also attended the Yale School of Drama, where he studied Theatre Management.

== Career ==
After volunteering with the Jesuit Volunteer Corps in Raleigh, North Carolina, Padrón moved to Baltimore, where he worked as an intern for Center Stage. From 2008 to 2011 he met and worked under Bill Rauch as an associate producer for the Oregon Shakespeare Festival. Rauch was so impressed with Padrón that he kept the position open for a year until Padrón had graduated from Yale. After working there he became a producer at Steppenwolf Theatre Company in Chicago. His time there was spent working as the artistic director in the Garage, the company's second stage involved specifically in working with new works, artists, and audiences. Padrón has also worked as a Senior Line Producer at The Public Theater.

He was also the producer for "365 Days/365 Plays" by Suzan-Lori Parks, put on by Center Theatre Group in Los Angeles.

Padrón was named "one to watch" by American Theatre magazine and has received the SPARK Leadership Fellowship from the Theatre Communications Group.

He has been a guest lecturer at Northwestern University, and is one of the founders of the Artists' Anti-Racism Coalition.

=== Tilted Field Productions ===
Padrón co-founded Tilted Field Productions in 2010 with Becca Wolff. LA Weekly named the production company the Best Avant-Garde Rock Musical Theatre Company in 2013.

=== The Sol Project ===
Padrón is the founder and artistic director of The Sol Project, a national theater initiative intended to amplify Latinx voices and push Latinx playwrights into mainstream American theatre culture. The project aims to pair Latino/a playwrights with leading Off-Broadway theater companies who commit to producing the work of these writers. The project has resulted in the production of Oedipus El Rey, a play by Luis Alfaro, among others.

==== Partnerships ====
As of March 2018, the following Off-Broadway theaters have partnered with the Sol Project. They will all co-produce at least one Sol Project play each as well as commission a new piece from a Latinx playwright.
Atlantic Theater Company, LAByrinth Theater Company, MCC Theater, New Georges, New York Theatre Workshop, Playwrights Horizons, Playwrights Realm, The Public Theater, Rattlestick Playwrights Theater, Women's Project Theater, and Yale Repertory Theatre.

=== Long Wharf Theatre ===
As of November 2018 Padrón is the artistic director of Long Wharf Theatre. Padrón has said that a focus of his at Long Wharf is to create "a more inclusive American theater" and that he would like to have collaborations between Long Wharf and the Sol Project if possible.
