= Amy M. Baggio =

American judge (born 1973)

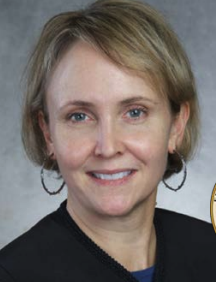

Judge of the United States District Court for the District of Oregon
- Incumbent
- Assumed office August 22, 2024
- Appointed by: Joe Biden
- Preceded by: Marco A. Hernandez

Judge of the Multnomah County Circuit Court
- In office March 19, 2019 – August 22, 2024
- Appointed by: Kate Brown
- Preceded by: Marilyn Litzenberger
- Succeeded by: Jeff Auxier

Personal details
- Born: Amy Margaret Baggio; 1973 (age 52–53) Pittsburgh, Pennsylvania, U.S.
- Education: Wake Forest University (BA); Lewis & Clark College (JD)

Amy Margaret Baggio (born 1973) is an American lawyer who has served as a United States district judge of the United States District Court for the District of Oregon since 2024. A native of Pittsburgh, Pennsylvania, prior to appointment to the bench, she had a career in criminal defense, including as a federal public defender. She also previously served as a judge of the Multnomah County Circuit Court from 2019 to 2024.

== Early life and education ==
Baggio was born in Pittsburgh. Baggio received a Bachelor of Arts in speech communication, cum laude, in 1995 from Wake Forest University in Winston-Salem, North Carolina, and a Juris Doctor in 2001 from Lewis & Clark Law School in Portland, Oregon.

== Early life and career ==
From 2001 to 2002, Baggio served as a staff attorney in the Portland Office of the Metropolitan Public Defender. From 2002 to 2005, she served as a research and writing attorney and then from 2005 to 2012 as an assistant federal public defender, both within the Office of the Federal Public Defender for the District of Oregon. From 2013 to 2019, she worked as a sole practitioner at her own criminal law defense firm, Baggio Law, also in Portland. On March 19, 2019, Oregon Governor Kate Brown appointed Baggio to serve as a judge of the Multnomah County Circuit Court in Portland, to fill the vacancy left by the retirement of Judge Marilyn Litzenberger.

In 2021, Baggio presided over a case that raised questions about the quality of medical care at the Snake River Correctional Institution. Baggio ruled that the prison's masking compliance had been inadequate and "creates an unjustifiable risk" throughout the prison.

=== Federal judicial service ===
On June 1, 2023, Baggio was one of six names U.S. senators Ron Wyden and Jeff Merkley submitted to the White House. On November 15, 2023, President Joe Biden announced his intent to nominate Baggio to serve as a United States district judge of the United States District Court for the District of Oregon. On November 27, 2023, her nomination was sent to the Senate. President Biden nominated Baggio to the seat being vacated by Judge Marco A. Hernandez, who subsequently assumed senior status on August 21, 2024.

On December 13, 2023, a hearing on her nomination was held before the Senate Judiciary Committee. On January 3, 2024, her nomination was returned to the president under Rule XXXI, Paragraph 6 of the United States Senate and she was renominated on January 8, 2024. On January 18, 2024, her nomination was reported out of committee by a 12–9 vote. On February 6, 2024, the Senate invoked cloture on her nomination by a 54–43 vote. Later that day, her nomination was confirmed by a 54–44 vote. She received her judicial commission on August 22, 2024, and was sworn in the next day.

=== Notable cases ===
- Baggio and Ruben Iniquez, who also worked as an assistant federal public defender, were appointed to represent Nazar Chaman Gul in his case filed in U.S. District Court. Baggio and Iniquez helped secure the release of Gul, an Afghan imprisoned at Guantanamo Bay Prison since 2003, in what turned out to be a case of mistaken identity.
- In 2023, Baggio sentenced Tusitala "Tiny" Toese, a member of the Proud Boys, to an additional two years in prison beyond the minimum sentence for his role in a 2021 brawl in east Portland.

== See also ==
- List of Oregon judges

Legal offices
Preceded by Marco A. Hernandez	Judge of the United States District Court for the District of Oregon; 2024–present	Incumbent
