= Geiger v. Kitzhaber =

2014 court case in Oregon, US, about same-sex marriage

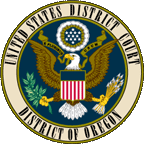
- Court: United States District Court for the District of Oregon
- Full case name: Deanna L. Geiger and Janine M. Nelson, William Griesar and Robert Duehmig, Plaintiffs and Paul Rummell and Benjamin West, Lisa Chickadonz and Christine Tanner, Basic Rights Education Fund, Plaintiffs v. John Kitzhaber, in his official capacity as Governor of the State of Oregon, Ellen Rosenblum, in her official capacity as Oregon Attorney General, Jennifer Woodward, in her official capacity as State Registrar, Center of Health Statistics, and Randy Walruff, in his official capacity as Multnomah County Assessor, Defendants
- Argued: April 23, 2014
- Decided: May 19, 2014
- Docket nos.: 6:13-cv-01834
- Citation: 994 F. Supp. 2d 1128

Case history
- Subsequent actions: U.S. Court of Appeals (No. 14-35427, 9th Cir.) May 4, 2014: Appeal by movants National Organization for Marriage denied intervenor status lodged. May 19, 2014: Emergency motion for stay of injunction by proposed intervenors denied. Aug. 27, 2014: Appeal ordered dismissed. (Order) Nov. 24, 2014: Request for initial en banc hearing denied. Dec. 3, 2014: Mandate to dismiss case issued. U.S. Supreme Court (No. 13A1173) May 27, 2014: Application for stay lodged sub nom. National Organization for Marriage, Inc. v. Geiger. Jun. 4, 2014: Stay denied, 2014 WL 2514491. (Order)

Holding
- Plaintiffs' motion for summary judgment granted. Oregon's marriage laws that exclude "same-gender" gay and lesbian couples violate equal protection

Court membership
- Judge sitting: Michael J. McShane

Keywords
- Same-sex marriage; equal protection; due process; marriage equality; discrimination

Geiger v. Kitzhaber, 994 F. Supp. 2d 1128 (D. Or. 2014), is a decision by the U.S. District Court for the District of Oregon that requires Oregon to allow same-sex couples to marry and to recognize same-sex marriages established in other jurisdictions. The decision arose from two consolidated cases that alleged that Oregon's constitutional ban on same-sex marriage, Article 15, § 5, and all related marriage statutes, violate the Due Process Clause and the Equal Protection Clause of the Fourteenth Amendment to the United States Constitution. Among the several defendants, Attorney General Ellen Rosenblum filed appearances in the case to defend Oregon's position, but declined to defend the constitutionality of the bans and ordered state agencies to recognize the validity of same-sex marriages established elsewhere.

U.S. District Judge Michael J. McShane ruled on May 19, 2014, that Oregon's constitution and statutes restricting marriage rights for same-sex couples violate the U.S. Constitution and ordered an immediate end to their enforcement.

The National Organization for Marriage, an organization opposed to same-sex marriage, tried without success to intervene in the suit, to stay enforcement of the district court decision, and to appeal that decision.

== Filing ==
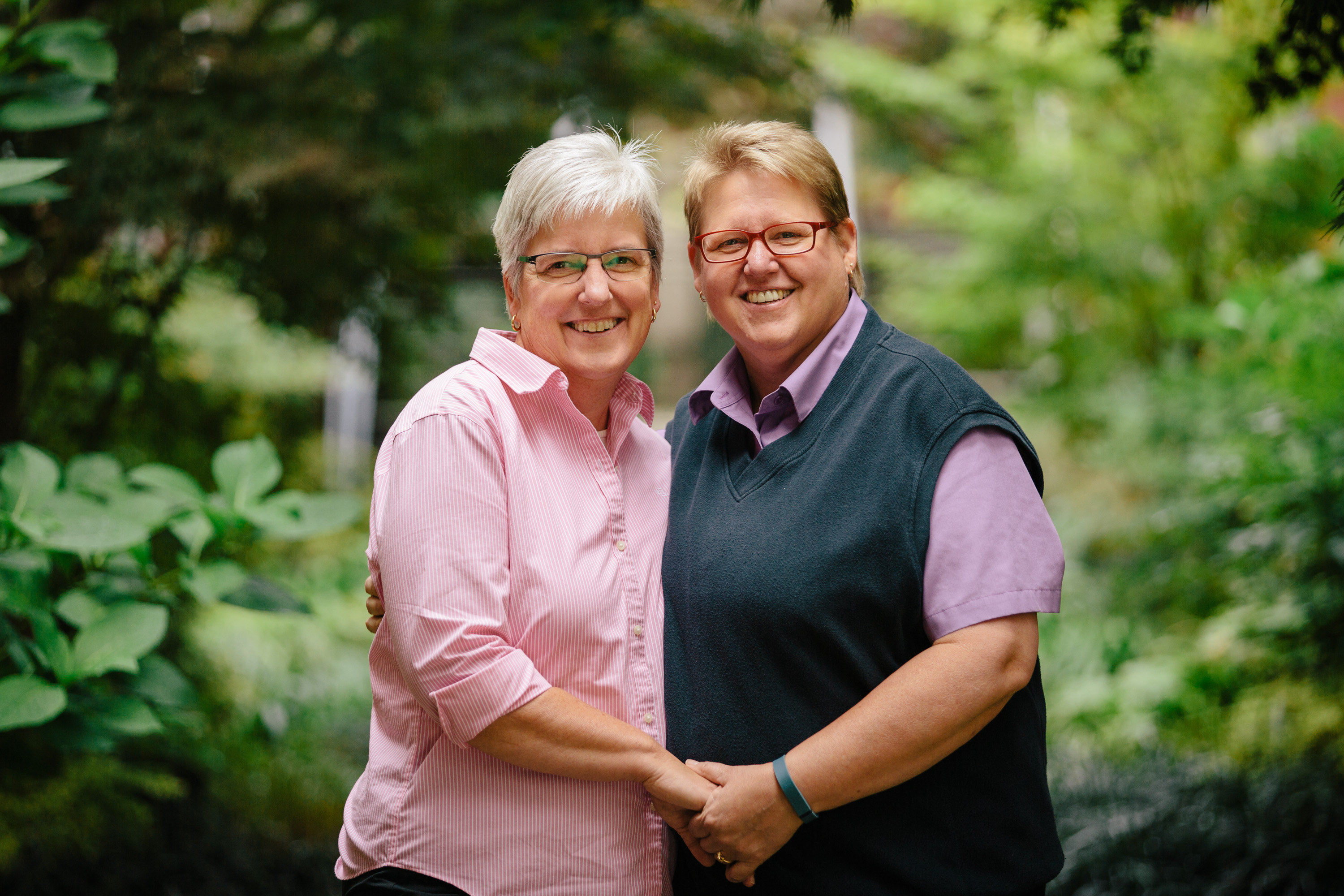
Deanna Geiger and Janine Nelson, lead plaintiffs in Geiger v. Kitzhaber

Geiger v. Kitzhaber was filed on October 15, 2013, by Deanna Geiger and Janine Nelson, a lesbian couple wanting to marry in Oregon, and by William Griesar and Robert Duehmig, a gay male couple together for 25 years who had married in Canada. The case was filed in the United States District Court of Oregon. The case claims that Oregon's constitutional ban on same gender marriage, Article 15, § 5, and all Oregon marriage statutes referring to husband and wife that government officials interpreted in a way that excluded full and equal marriage rights for gay and lesbian couples, violate the Due Process Clause and the Equal Protection Clause of the Fourteenth Amendment to the United States Constitution. The couples named as defendants Governor John Kitzhaber, Attorney General Ellen Rosenblum, Jennifer Woodward, State Registrar, and Randy Walruff, Multnomah County Assessor.

== Recognition of out-of-state marriages ==
The next day, October 16, the state's Chief Operating Officer Michael Jordan directed state agencies to "recognize all out-of-state marriages for the purposes of administering state programs. That includes legal, same-sex marriages performed in other states and countries." He cited an opinion by the Oregon Department of Justice dated the same day. According to that opinion, Jordan had inquired whether, in the light of the U.S. Supreme Court decision in United States v. Windsor and the fact that California and Washington were recognizing same-sex marriages, Oregon could recognize same-sex marriages established in other jurisdictions. Deputy Attorney General Mary H. Williams, writing on behalf of the Department of Justice, replied to his inquiry saying: "We cannot identify any legitimate (much less compelling) state interest in requiring that each marriage recognized in Oregon contain one partner of each sex. We conclude that state agencies can recognize these marriages as valid. To do otherwise would likely violate the federal constitution."

== Consolidation ==
The case was assigned to U.S. District Judge Michael J. McShane. Two months after Geiger was filed, two additional couples and the Basic Rights Education Fund filed another lawsuit, Rummell v. Kitzhaber, again alleging that Oregon's ban on same-sex marriages was unconstitutional. The Rummell plaintiffs asked the court to consolidate their case with the Geiger case. The Geiger plaintiffs objected to the consolidation because it would cause a delay in the ruling. On January 22, 2014, Judge McShane consolidated the two cases. The plaintiffs in both Geiger and Rummell filed motions asking for summary judgment, since no facts were in dispute.

== Attorney General's response ==
On February 20, 2014, Attorney General Ellen Rosenblum filed an answer to the Rummell plaintiffs' complaint in which she conceded that Oregon's laws excluding same-sex couples from marriage were unconstitutional. She told the court that she believed "that performing same-sex marriages in Oregon would have no adverse effect on existing marriages, and that sexual orientation does not determine an individual's capacity to establish a loving and enduring relationship." She found it impossible to defend the state's "under any standard of review" and her office would no longer defend the ban in court. Speaking publicly, she announced that the "Oregon Department of Justice will not defend the prohibition in our state's constitution against marriages between people of the same sex."

== Oral arguments ==
On April 23, 2014, Judge Michael McShane heard oral arguments on the motions for summary judgment in the consolidated lawsuit. While all parties present supported same-sex marriage, Judge McShane questioned whether there was a role for Oregon voters who had approved the amendment defining marriage in 2004 and considered whether to implement his ruling immediately or stay his ruling and await guidance from related cases pending in the U.S. courts of appeal. The court scheduled another session of oral arguments for May 14, where the National Organization for Marriage ("NOM"), an organization that opposes same-sex marriage, tried without success to qualify for intervention in the case. McShane ruled that the group was unreasonably late in filing its request to intervene and that it failed to convincingly demonstrate that it should be allowed to intervene on behalf of three anonymous Oregon-based members of NOM.

== Ruling ==
The court granted the plaintiffs' motion for summary judgment on May 19, resulting in the immediate legalization of same-sex marriage in Oregon.

Judge McShane departed from the common descriptor of "same-sex" throughout his opinion, using instead the terms same-gender marriage and same-gender couples. His opinion included several paragraphs designed for the public:

I am aware that a large number of Oregonians, perhaps even a majority, have religious or moral objections to expanding the definition of civil marriage (and thereby expanding the benefits and rights that accompany marriage) to gay and lesbian families. It was these same objections that led to the passage of Measure 36 in 2004. Generations of Americans, my own included, were raised in a world in which homosexuality was believed to be a moral perversion, a mental disorder, or a mortal sin...On a darker level, that same worldview led to an environment of cruelty, violence, and self-loathing. It was but 1986 when the United States Supreme Court justified, on the basis of a "millennia of moral teaching," the imprisonment of gay men and lesbian women who engaged in consensual sexual acts. ...

It is not surprising then that many of us raised with such a world view would wish to protect our beliefs and our families by turning to the ballot box to enshrine in law those traditions we have come to value. But just as the Constitution protects the expression of these moral viewpoints, it equally protects the minority from being diminished by them. ...

I believe that if we can look for a moment past gender and sexuality, we can see in these plaintiffs nothing more or less than our own families. Families who we would expect our Constitution to protect, if not exalt, in equal measure. With discernment we see not shadows lurking in closets or the stereotypes of what was once believed; rather, we see families committed to the common purpose of love, devotion, and service to the greater community.

Where will this all lead? I know that many suggest we are going down a slippery slope that will have no moral boundaries. To those who truly harbor such fears, I can only say this: Let us look less to the sky to see what might fall; rather, let us look to each other ... and rise.

Minutes after the decision was announced at noon, officials in at least four counties were fulfilling requests for marriage licenses from same-sex couples. Multnomah County issued 96 licenses the first day, and judges officiated at wedding ceremonies at six altars set up in a Portland ballroom. Deanna Geiger and Janine Nelson were the first to marry after Judge McShane's ruling.

== Appeals ==
On May 4, 2014, while the Geiger case was still pending in district court, the National Organization for Marriage (NOM) filed an appeal of the district court's denial of intervenor status in the U.S. Court of Appeals for the Ninth Circuit. Once Judge McShane released his May 19, 2014, order, NOM immediately sought a stay of that order from the Ninth Circuit, which denied that emergency motion that same day. The state defendants, including Governor Kitzhaber, joined by the plaintiffs, moved the next day to dismiss NOM's appeal as moot. They argued that Judge McShane was correct in denying NOM intervenor status, and that therefore NOM lacked standing and its appeal was moot. On August 27, a three-judge panel of the Court of Appeals, consisting of U.S. Circuit Judges Schroeder, Thomas, and N.R. Smith, agreed and granted the motion dismissing the appeal.

On May 27, 2014, NOM filed an application for an emergency stay with Justice Anthony Kennedy, the Circuit Justice for the Ninth Circuit. On June 4, Justice Kennedy referred the application to the full U.S. Supreme Court, which rejected the request for a stay without comment or recorded dissent on June 4.

On November 24, 2014, the Ninth Circuit denied NOM's request for an initial hearing en banc. On December 3, 2014, the Ninth Circuit issued the mandate finalizing its August 27 decision to dismiss NOM's appeal.

On April 20, 2015, the U.S. Supreme Court denied another NOM petition for review.

== Attorneys ==
Lake Perriguey of Law Works LLC began working on the case in July 2013. He and Lea Ann Easton of Dorsay & Easton LLP filed Geiger in October 2013.

Tom Johnson and Misha Isaak of Perkins Coie LLP, and Jennifer Middleton of Johnson Johnson & Schaller PC, together with ACLU staff attorneys Kevin Diaz, Amanda Goad, and Rose Saxe, filed Rummell in December 2013 on behalf of Basic Rights Education Fund and two other plaintiff couples. In addition to litigating a challenge to Oregon's marriage laws on behalf of their clients, the Rummell attorneys represented the plaintiffs in both consolidated cases in opposing the National Organization for Marriage's motion to intervene and motions to stay at the Ninth Circuit Court of Appeals and U.S. Supreme Court.

The Oregon Attorney General's office represented Governor Kitzhaber and the state registrar. The lawyers were Sheila Potter, Anna Joyce, and Mary Williams. The Office of Multnomah County Attorney represented the Multnomah County defendant. The lawyers were Jenny Morf Madkour and Kate von Ter Stegge.

== See also ==
- LGBT rights in Oregon
- Same-sex marriage in Oregon
