= Marco A. Hernandez =

American judge (born 1957)

Marco Antonio Hernandez
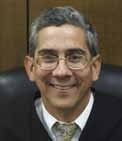

Senior Judge of the United States District Court for the District of Oregon
- Incumbent
- Assumed office August 21, 2024

Chief Judge of the United States District Court for the District of Oregon
- In office December 23, 2019 – January 1, 2024
- Preceded by: Michael W. Mosman
- Succeeded by: Michael J. McShane

Judge of the United States District Court for the District of Oregon
- In office February 9, 2011 – August 21, 2024
- Appointed by: Barack Obama
- Preceded by: Garr King
- Succeeded by: Amy M. Baggio

Judge of the Washington County Circuit Court
- In office 1998 – February 9, 2011
- Appointed by: Barbara Roberts
- Succeeded by: Janelle F. Wipper

Personal details
- Born: Marco Antonio Hernandez; 1957 (age 68–69) Nogales, Arizona, U.S.
- Education: Western Oregon University (BA); University of Washington (JD)

Marco Antonio Hernandez (born 1957) is a senior United States district judge of the United States District Court for the District of Oregon.

== Early life and education ==
Hernandez was born in Nogales, Arizona, in 1957 and is of Hispanic descent. He moved to Oregon at 17 and began work as a dishwasher, and then as a janitor before working his way through community college while working as a teacher's aide. Hernandez then moved on to a four-year school and received a Bachelor of Arts degree from Western Oregon State College (now known as Western Oregon University) in 1983. He then attended the University of Washington School of Law and earned his Juris Doctor in 1986.

== Career ==
After law school he returned to Oregon where he spent three years working for Legal Aid Services of Oregon where he often represented farm workers. Following his time with legal aid, Hernandez then joined the Washington County District Attorney's office as a deputy prosecutor in 1989. Shortly before leaving office in January 1995, Governor Barbara Roberts appointed Hernandez to be Washington County Circuit Court Judge. In 2001, he allowed a claim for loss of companionship in a pet case to go to trial, the first time such a claim was allowed to go to trial in the United States. Hernandez served as Presiding Judge of the County's Circuit Court from 2002 to 2005. He won re-election to a new six-year term on the court in May 2008. He has also served as the judge for the county's Mental Health Court, and as presiding judge from 2002 until 2005.

== Federal judicial nominations ==
In January 2008, Hernandez was one of three candidates recommended by a six-member judicial selection committee to replace Garr King on the United States District Court for the District of Oregon. President George W. Bush selected Hernandez to fill the vacancy on the District Court of Oregon and submitted his nomination on July 23, 2008. Senators Gordon H. Smith and Ron Wyden supported the nomination, but it was made with less than six months remaining in the Bush presidency. The nomination was not acted upon by the 110th Congress and was thus returned. Republican Gordon Smith was narrowly defeated for re-election in 2008, and newly elected President Barack Obama restarted the judicial selection process for the District of Oregon. Democrat Ron Wyden recommended Hernandez in addition to five other candidates selected by a thirteen-member judicial selection committee. On July 14, 2010, Obama renominated Hernandez to replace Garr King. He is one of few people to be nominated to the federal bench by presidents from two different political parties. The Senate again failed to act on Hernandez's nomination, and President Obama nominated Hernandez again in January 2011. On February 7, 2011, the Senate unanimously confirmed Hernandez as the newest judge for the District of Oregon, and he received his commission on February 9. He became chief judge on December 23, 2019 and served until January 1, 2024, when he was succeeded by Judge Michael J. McShane. He assumed senior status on August 21, 2024.

== See also ==
- George W. Bush judicial appointment controversies
- List of Hispanic and Latino American jurists
- List of first minority male lawyers and judges in Oregon

Legal offices
Preceded by Garr King	Judge of the United States District Court for the District of Oregon; 2011–2024	Succeeded by Amy M. Baggio
Preceded by Michael W. Mosman	Chief Judge of the United States District Court for the District of Oregon; 2019–2024	Succeeded by Michael J. McShane
