= Luis Alfaro =

American actor, writer and theater director (born 1963)

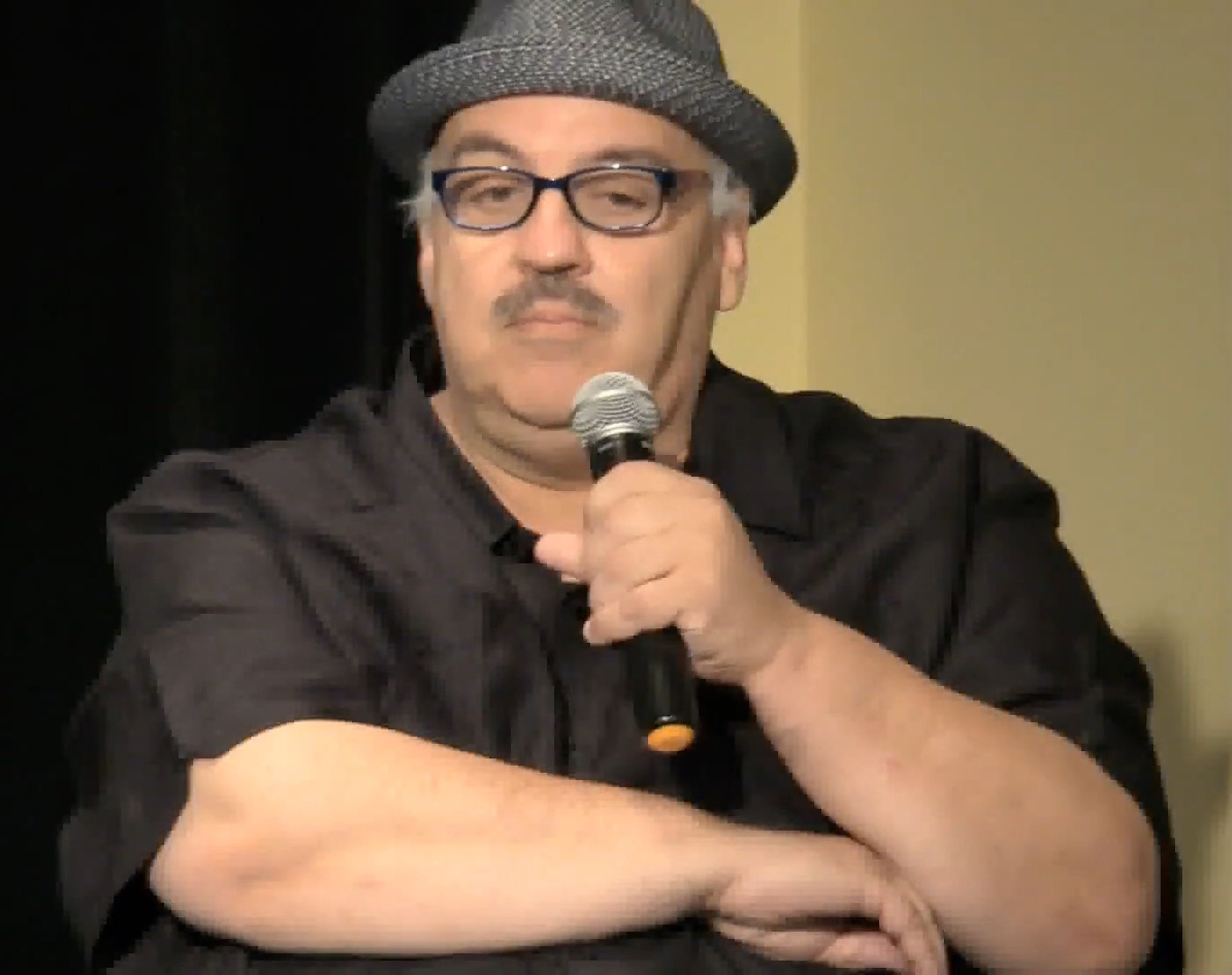
- Luis Alfaro at the Oregon Shakespeare Festival in Ashland, September 2019
- Born: Luis Alfaro; 1961 (age 64–65); Los Angeles, California
- Occupations: Performance artist; playwright; theater director; social activist
- Years active: 1992–present

Luis Alfaro (born 1963 in Los Angeles) is a Chicano performance artist, writer, theater director, and social activist.

He grew up in the Pico Union district near downtown Los Angeles and graduated from Woodrow Wilson High School in East Los Angeles. His plays and fiction are set in Los Angeles' Chicano barrios including the Pico Union district; they sometimes feature gay, lesbian, and working-class themes. Many of Alfaro's plays reference AIDS in Latino communities. Some of his noted plays are "Bitter Homes and Gardens," "Pico Union," "Downtown," "Cuerpo Politizado," "Straight as a Line," "Breakfast, Lunch & Dinner," "No Holds Barrio," and "Black Butterfly." Many of the plays also have been published as stories or poetry. He is an associate professor in the School of Dramatic Arts at the University of Southern California; from 2013 to 2019, he was the playwright-in-residence at the Oregon Shakespeare Festival.

== Background ==
His writing, both sole-authored and collaborative, is collected in numerous anthologies. In 1994 his spoken-word CD, Downtown was released. His short film Chicanismo was produced by the Public broadcasting Service and released in 1999. He contributed to the 1995 film Pochonovela, a collaboration between the Cuban American performer Coco Fusco and the LA-based Chicano performance ensemble, Chicano Secret Service. The mock telenovela explores and sends up Chicano activism and assimilation in a sardonic exploration of working class barrio life.

In 2010, his play Oedipus El Rey, a Chicano retelling of Oedipus Rex, had its world premiere at the Magic Theatre in San Francisco. Oedipus El Rey had its Texas regional premiere at Dallas Theater Center from January 16-March 2, 2014 under the direction of Kevin Moriarty. The play was at San Diego Repertory Theatre from March 10–29, 2015 under the direction of Sam Woodhouse. Oedipus El Rey received its New York premiere at The Public Theater in collaboration with The Sol Project and Jacob Padrón in 2017. The play was produced at The Public Theater's Shiva Theater from October 3-November 19 under the direction of Chay Yew and was scheduled to run in 2018. The New York cast featured Juan Castano, Sandra Delgado, Julio Monge, Joel Perez, Brian Quijada, Reza Salazar, and Juan Francisco Villa.

Luis Alfaro's solo show St. Jude is the playwright's tribute to his father. St. Jude is an autobiographical play which details the complicated relationship between Alfaro and his father. The show begins with Alfaro describing going home to rural California after learning his father has suffered a stroke. The play moves back and forth between Alfaro growing up and the events that follow his father's stroke. There are many stories within the larger narrative and they relate to the overall theme of finding identity. Scenes from his childhood include working in the fields during summers, family celebrations, and some rocky teenage years, including once running away. The small stories and anecdotes from Alfaro's childhood all relate back to his father or his personal journey. St. Jude was produced at the Kirk Douglas Theatre in Culver City, California from September 19-October 6, 2013 under the direction of Robert Egan. The play ran from February 13–16, 2014 at South Coast Repertory in Costa Mesa, California. St. Jude was produced as part of Victory Gardens Theater's Up Close and Personal Series in 2017.

Luis Alfaro's Mojada: A Medea in Los Angeles is a contemporary retelling of Medea. Mojada was first held at the Magic Theatre in San Francisco in 2012 with the title Bruja. Mojada: A Medea in Los Angeles and then shown at the Getty Villa in 2015. The premiere was produced by artistic director, Chay Yew, and managing director, Chris Mannelli. Mojada was shown at Oregon Shakespeare Festival in Ashland from February 19-July 5, 2017 under the direction of Juliette Carrillo. The cast featured Sabina Zúñiga Varela, Lakin Valdez, VIVIS, Nancy Rodriguez, Vilma Silva, Jahnangel Jimenez, and Connor Chaney. Mojada played Off-Broadway at the Public Theatre July 2-August 11, 2019 under the direction of Chay Yew with Sabina Zúñiga Varela reprising her starring role, but with the play set in Queens instead of LA.

Rosa Andújar edited The Greek Trilogy of Luis Alfaro bringing together for the first time Alfaro's three 'Greek' plays. The plays are based on Sophocles' Electra and Oedipus, and Euripides' Medea. Alfaro's Electricidad, Oedipus El Rey, and Mojada portray concerns of the Chicano and wider Latino communities in Los Angeles and New York through ancient drama.

== Grants and awards ==
Alfaro has been the recipient of numerous awards, including the MacArthur "Genius" Foundation Fellowship in 1997, and the 1998 National Hispanic Playwriting Competition Prize.

In 2013, he began a three-year term as the Playwright in Residence at the Oregon Shakespeare Festival through the National Playwright Residency Program, funded by the Andrew W. Mellon Foundation and administered by HowlRound. In 2016, the grant was renewed for an additional three years. During the six-year tenure, "OSF hosted the first and then other Latinx Playwrights' Projects" to develop new work by Latinx playwrights.

== Plays ==
- The Gardens of Aztlan
- Breakfast, Lunch & Dinner
- Black Butterfly, Jaguar Girl, Piñata Woman and Other Superhero Girls, Like Me
- Lady Bird
- Bitter Homes and Gardens
- Straight as a Line
- Body of Faith
- No Holds Barrio (2004)
- Downtown
- Electricidad (2003)
- Oedipus El Rey (2010)
- Bruja (2012)
- St. Jude (2013)
- Alleluia, The Road (2013)
- This Golden State Part One: Delano (2015)
- Mojada: A Medea in Los Angeles (2015)

== Screenplays ==
- Chicanismo (1997 short)
- From Prada to Nada (2011)

== Performances ==
- The Pikme-Up (2006)

== Bibliography ==
- Alfaro, Luis. "Pico-Union," in Men on Men 4, edited by George Stambolian, Plume, New York, 1992, pp. 268–283.
- Alfaro, Luis. Down Town, (CD), New Alliance Records, Lawndale, 1993.
- Alfaro, Luis. "Cuerpo Politizado," in Uncontrollable Bodies: Testimonies of Art and Culture, edited by Rodney Sappington and Tyler Stallings, Bay Press, Seattle, 1994, pp. 216–241.
- Alfaro, Luis. "Bitter Homes and Gardens," in His, edited by Robert Drake and Terry Wolverton, Faber and Faber, Boston, 1995, pp. 100–107.
- Alfaro, Luis. "Straight as a Line," in Out of the Fringe: Contemporary Latina/Latino Theatre and Performance, edited by Caridad Svich and Maria Teresa Marrero, Theatre Communication Group, New York, 2000, pp. 1–42.
- Andújar, Rosa (ed.). The Greek Trilogy of Luis Alfaro: Electricidad, Oedipus El Rey, Mojada, Methuen Drama [Bloomsbury], London and New York, 2020.

== Critical studies ==
- Allatson, Paul. "Siempre feliz en mi falda: Luis Alfaro's Simulative Challenge," in GLQ (A Journal of Gay and Lesbian Studies), vol. 5, no. 2, 1999, pp. 199–230.
- Allatson, Paul. "Luis Alfaro," in The Oxford Encyclopedia of Latina/o Literature, Oxford University Press, New York, 2019.
- Andújar, Rosa. "Luis Alfaro's Griego Drama: An Introduction," in The Greek Trilogy of Luis Alfaro: Electricidad, Oedipus El Rey, Mojada, edited by Rosa Andújar, Methuen Drama [Bloomsbury], London and New York, 2020, pp. 1–19.
- Andújar, Rosa. "Electricidad: A Chicanx Tragedy of Family, Feminism, and Fury," in The Greek Trilogy of Luis Alfaro: Electricidad, Oedipus El Rey, Mojada, edited by Rosa Andújar, Methuen Drama [Bloomsbury], London and New York, 2020, pp. 20–26.
- Andújar, Rosa. "Oedipus El Rey: Blind Love and the Chains of Destiny," in The Greek Trilogy of Luis Alfaro: Electricidad, Oedipus El Rey, Mojada, edited by Rosa Andújar, Methuen Drama [Bloomsbury], London and New York, 2020, pp. 110–114.
- Andújar, Rosa. "Mojada: Dramatizing Latinx Migrations," in The Greek Trilogy of Luis Alfaro: Electricidad, Oedipus El Rey, Mojada, edited by Rosa Andújar, Methuen Drama [Bloomsbury], London and New York, 2020, pp. 180–186.
- Arrizón, Alicia. Queering Mestizaje: Transculturation and Performance, University of Michigan Press, Ann Arbor, 2006.
- Foster, David William. "El cuerpo de Luís Alfaro: identidades sexuales y performance," in Literatura e autoritarismo: estudos culturais, no. 1 (Janeiro 2003).
- Foster, David William. "The Representation of the Queer Body in Latin American Theater," in Latin American Theatre Review, vol. 38, no. 1 (Fall 2004), pp. 23–38.
- Foster, David William. El ambiente nuestro: Chicano/Latino Homoerotic Writing, Bilingual Press/Editorial Bilingüe, Tempe, AZ, 2006.
- Muñoz, José Esteban. "Luis Alfaro's Memory Theatre," in Corpus Delecti, edited by Coco Fusco, Routledge, New York and London, 1999.
- Rodriguez y Gibson, Eliza. "Luis Alfaro," in The Greenwood Encyclopedia of Multiethnic American Literature, edited by Emmanuel S. Nelson. Greenwood Press, Westport, CT, 2005. Vol. 1, pp. 131–132.
- Román, David. "'Teatro Viva!' Latino Performance and the Politics of AIDS in Los Angeles," in ¿Entiendes? Queer Readings, Hispanic Writings, edited by Emilie L. Bergman and Paul Julian Smith (eds.), Duke University Press, Durham, 1995, pp. 346–369.
- Román, David. "Luis Alfaro," in The Oxford Encyclopedia of Latinos and Latinas in the United States, edited by Suzanne Oboler and Deena J. González, Oxford University Press, New York and Oxford, 2005. Vol. 1, pp. 57–59.
- Ybarra, Patricia. "Luis Alfaro," in 50 Key Figures in Queer US Theatre, edited by Jimmy A. Noriega and Jordan Schildcrout. Routledge, 2022, pp. 21–25.
