= Jesuit Volunteer Corps =

Organization of lay volunteers

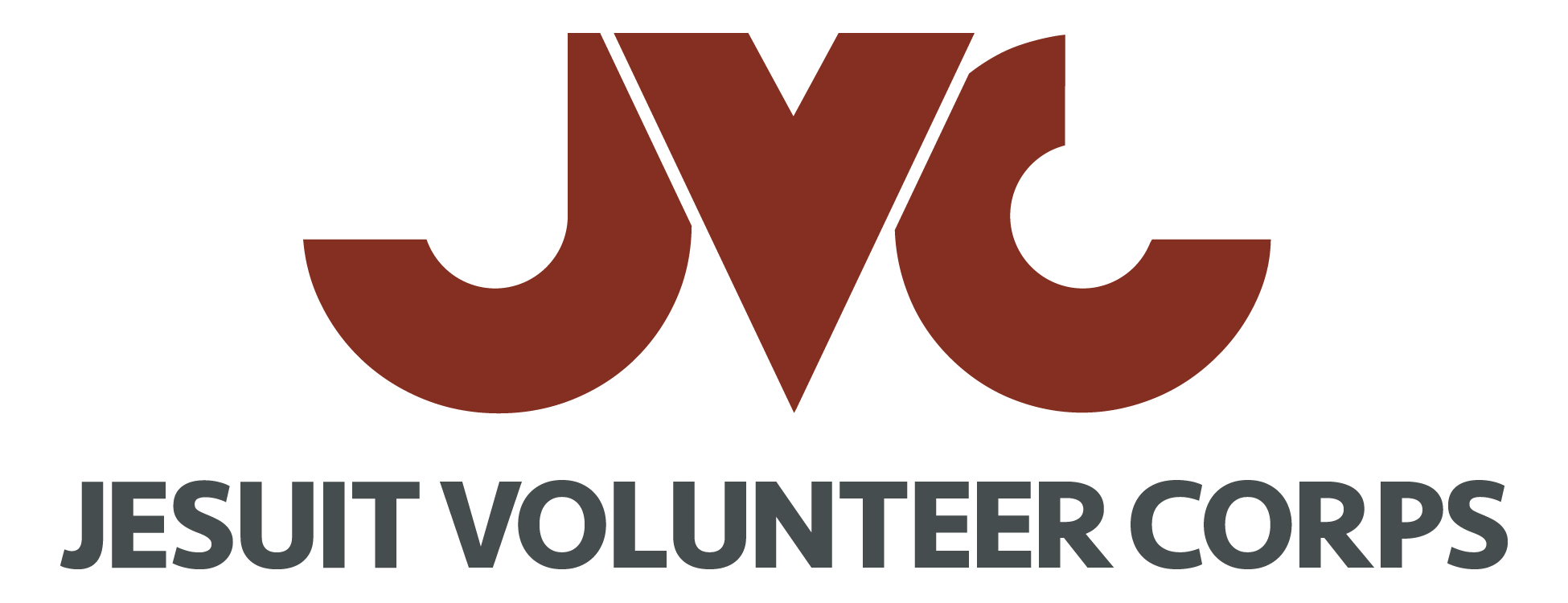
- Formation: 1956; 70 years ago
- Type: Non-profit corporation
- Purpose: Social justice and Volunteer work
- Headquarters: 801 Saint Paul St. Baltimore, MD 21202
- Region served: United States, Chile, Peru, Belize, Tanzania, and Micronesia
- Members: 10,000 alumni
- President: John Giere
- Volunteers: 250
- Website: jesuitvolunteers.org

The Jesuit Volunteer Corps (JVC) is an organization of lay volunteers who volunteer one year or more to community service with poor communities. JVC works in inner city neighborhoods and rural communities in about 36 different cities throughout the U.S. JVC works with the homeless, abused women and children, immigrants and refugees, the mentally ill, people with HIV/AIDS and other illnesses, the elderly, children, and on behalf of other marginalized groups. Jesuit Volunteers (JVs) in the international program that places volunteers in other countries.

The organization's official motto is "Dare to change".

== Founding and history ==
=== Copper Valley School ===
In 1956, Jesuits from the Oregon Province of the Society of Jesus and the Sisters of Saint Ann formed a partnership to open the Copper Valley School—a boarding school for Native Alaskan children—near Glennallen, Alaska. Bishop Francis Doyle Gleeson saw the need for a good boarding school closer to villagers, which became a plan to build the Copper Valley School. St. Ann Sister George Edmond went to the East Coast and persuaded five students to teach at Copper Valley. Bishop Gleeson formed a team of lay volunteers, mostly engineering students from Gonzaga University. These lay volunteers, brought into Alaska by Gleeson and Edmond, were the first recruits of what became the Jesuit Volunteer Corps. The religious, the students and volunteers faced much adversity in constructing the school, including working in temperatures of seventy-below-zero during the Alaska winter. One student from a local village described the experience of meeting the new volunteers as bringing him "into a whole new world." The volunteers were considered lay missionaries. Copper Valley School closed in 1971.

=== Founding, expansion and influence ===
The Jesuit Volunteer Corps was founded and named by Jack Morris, S.J. Morris had participated in the initial Copper Valley School project as a seminarian. While Morris was working at Monroe Catholic High School in Fairbanks, Alaska, he learned about the progress of the Copper Valley School and saw the potential of the volunteers. Morris recruited volunteers at Catholic colleges all over the United States, telling students that JVC was twice as old as the Peace Corps and ten times more rewarding. His recruitment brochure called for those "young and old - with adult joy and adult stability. Men and women who dig in, work hard, laugh loud and often. Flexible enough to adjust to diverse companions, tasks and environments". During this time, JVs lived on a budget of ten dollars per month.

In the 1960s, Jesuit Volunteers branched out of Alaska and into the Pacific Northwest, serving Native Americans as well as marginalized populations in the inner cities, with the support of the Society of Jesus. JVs volunteered at St. Mary's Indian School on the Colville Indian Reservation in Northern Washington state. In Alaska, by 1968, JVs outnumbered Jesuits. JVs served in remote areas such as Nulato, Alaska. The four values that became the movement's guiding principles were not formalized, but JVs lived by them.

During this time, the JVC movement influenced other volunteer groups, including the Peace Corps. Over two hundred volunteer programs have been modeled after JVC.

=== National and international expansion ===
The initial Northwest JVC inspired other JVC chapters across the country. JVC chapters were established in the Midwest in 1974; on the East Coast in 1975; in the Southwest in 1977; in the American South in 1980. JVC also took root in other countries: England, Ireland, France, Italy, Bulgaria and the Philippines.

Jesuit International Volunteers (JIV) was formed in 1984. JIV had programs in Belize, Tanzania, Micronesia, Peru and Nepal.

In 1990, JVC had 350 volunteers in its program, and placement in the program was selective. In 1992, JVC had 425 volunteers.

As of 2025, JVC has faced significant challenges, with volunteer numbers in decline.

== JVC unification ==
In 2009, five of the six Jesuit Volunteer Corps organizations merged to form JVC to share their resources on behalf of their common mission and to strengthen the organization as a whole. After completing a month-long Ignatian discernment process and consulting with many current and former Jesuit Volunteers, Jesuit Volunteer Corps Northwest made the decision to remain an independent organization, addressing rural, urban and environmental needs in the Northwestern U.S. Since then there have been two Jesuit volunteer corps organizations in the U.S., united by a shared history and foundational values. As many as 500 volunteers in a given year have volunteered with JVC. The drop in number of JVs can be attributed to the new service programs, many of which were modeled after JVC.

In 2015, Timothy Shriver was named the president of JVC. The Washington Post wrote an article about a JV community in Washington DC. In 2016, PBS published a video story on the JV community in Scranton, Pennsylvania.

=== Catholicism ===
JVC incorporates Catholic teachings and spirituality into its programs, but is open to volunteers of all faiths. Pope Francis, a Jesuit, inspired Jesuit Volunteers.

=== Colleges ===
JVs come from many different colleges, including from Jesuit colleges. JVC recruits actively on the campuses of the Jesuit colleges in the United States, at Catholic colleges, and on the campuses of other universities. In 2014, eighteen graduates from the College of the Holy Cross joined JVC. In 2014, twelve graduates of Loyola University Maryland joined JVC. Many graduates from Boston College also join JVC.

=== Four values of JVC ===
Through retreats, local formation teams, and community living, volunteers are immersed in the "four values" of JVC: spirituality, community, simple living, and social justice. Jesuit volunteers make a commitment to the JVC program and to their service placements to strive to live these four values. JVC communities have evenings dedicated to spirituality and communal life. JVC is guided by the principles of Ignatian spirituality—named for St. Ignatius of Loyola, founder of the Society of Jesus, or the Jesuits. One of the core principles of Ignatian Spirituality is to find God in all things and all people. JVC has offered JVs spiritual advisors, retreats, and community spirituality nights. Many JVs work for justice, Ad maiorem Dei gloriam, for the greater glory of God. JV community houses are often located in low-income neighborhoods, aiming to expose JVs to the daily realities of living on the margins of society. JVs live on modest monthly stipends. The lifestyle aims to help JVs live in solidarity with the people they are working with. JVs live in an intentional community with other JVs working in their city. JVC aims to give JVs a greater understanding of some of the systemic causes of injustice by connecting JVs with disenfranchised people through work and in their communities.

=== Former Jesuit volunteers ===
After completing their service with JVC, many former Jesuit volunteers (FJVs) create a subculture of faith and service in the church. As of 2006, there were twelve thousand former Jesuit Volunteers worldwide. In Washington, D.C., former JVs, progressive adult Catholics, and others meet for faith-sharing groups and potluck dinners. This community is called "Guerilla Communion". Former Jesuit Volunteers or FJVs use the phrase "ruined for life" to describe their time of service with JVC. The term "ruined for life" was coined by JVC's founder Jack Morris. Some FJVs have entered religious life.

== Notable alumni ==
- Bob Casey Jr., attorney, U.S. senator from Pennsylvania - served as a Jesuit volunteer at the Gesu School in North Philadelphia teaching fifth grade after graduating from the College of the Holy Cross
- Joe Cimperman, Ohio politician
- Bob Ferguson, Attorney General of Washington, former member of the King County Council - worked with poor children in Portland, Oregon
- Bridget Gainer, Cook County Commissioner
- Daniel J. Hilferty, president and CEO of Independence Blue Cross - ran a community center in Portland, Oregon
- Brendan A. Hurson - U.S. District Judge in the District of Maryland
- Monica Márquez, Colorado Supreme Court justice - worked at an elementary school in Camden, New Jersey
- Michael J. McShane, federal judge
- U.S. Senator Tim Kaine is often identified as a participant in Jesuit Volunteers, but he went to Honduras to work at a Jesuit-run vocational school in 1980, before Jesuit Volunteers had a stand-alone international program. By his own account, while a high school student in 1974 Kaine visited a Jesuit mission in Honduras that had ties to his Jesuit high school. In 1980, after completing his first year of law school and without the support of any organization, he contacted that mission and arranged to work at its vocational training school as a volunteer teacher.
- Jacob Padrón, artistic director
- Hunter Biden, second son of former president Joe Biden- served at a church in Portland, Oregon.
