= Margaret Carter =

American politician (born 1935)

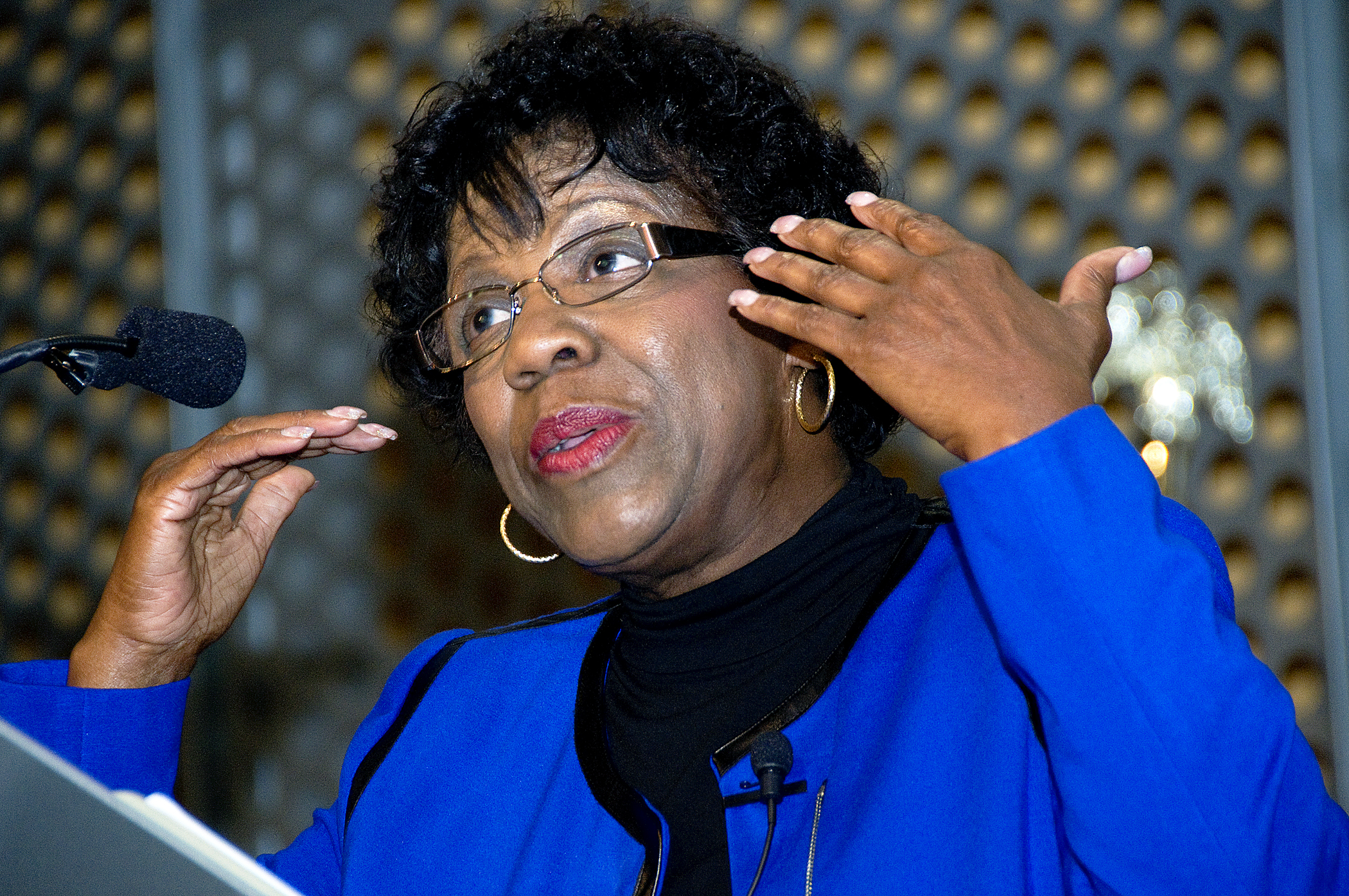

President pro tempore of the Oregon State Senate
- In office 2005 – August 31, 2009
- Preceded by: Lenn Hannon
- Succeeded by: Rick Metsger

Member of the Oregon Senate from the 8th, then 22nd district
- In office January 8, 2001 – August 31, 2009
- Preceded by: Thomas A. Wilde
- Succeeded by: Chip Shields
- Constituency: portions of Portland and Multnomah County

Member of the Oregon House of Representatives from the 18th district
- In office January 12, 1985 – January 13, 1999
- Preceded by: Ed Leek
- Succeeded by: Deborah Kafoury

Personal details
- Born: Margaret Louise Hunter; December 29, 1935 (age 90) Shreveport, Louisiana, U.S.
- Party: Democratic
- Education: Portland State University; Oregon State University
- Profession: educator, counselor
- Website: State Senate website

Margaret Louise Carter (née Hunter; December 29, 1935) is an American politician who was a Democratic member of the Oregon Legislative Assembly from 1985 to 1999 and 2001 to 2009 and was the first Black woman elected to the state's legislature. She served in the Oregon House of Representatives until 1999, and then in the Oregon State Senate from 2001 to 2009. She served as President Pro Tempore of the Senate, Vice Chair for Ways and Means, and as a member of both the Health and Human Services and Oregon State Hospital Patient Care committees. She announced her resignation from the Senate effective August 31, 2009, and took a post as Deputy Director for Human Services Programs at the Oregon Department of Human Services. In 2015, she was reportedly considering a return to the senate.

== Early life ==
Born Margaret Hunter in Shreveport, Louisiana, on December 29, 1935, her parents were Hilton and Emma Hunter. She was raised there in a family of nine children by her father, a Baptist minister, and her mother, a cook at the school cafeteria. After earning the honor as salutatorian in high school, she received scholarships to Grambling State University where she then briefly attended before meeting who would become her first husband. After getting married she had five daughters by the age of 28, but moved to Oregon to escape abuse by her then husband. She arrived via train on December 1, 1967, and began working odd jobs. In Oregon, she re-married, adding four stepchildren, but divorced after a few years to Elvis. In 1968, she enrolled at Portland Community College. In 1970, she enrolled at Portland State University where she then graduated from in 1972 with a bachelor of arts degree in education. Carter then earned a masters of education in psychology from Oregon State University in 1973. In 1973, Carter began working for Portland Community College as a counselor.

== Political career ==
Republican leaders recruited Carter to run for a seat in the Oregon House of Representatives in 1983. They hoped to unseat the incumbent in a heavily Democratic district in Northeast Portland. Carter won as a Democrat in 1984 and began serving at the 1985 legislative session representing District 18. She became the first African-American woman elected to the Oregon Legislative Assembly. In the House she worked to pass legislation that ended state controlled investments in South Africa during apartheid and legislation to observe Martin Luther King Jr.'s birthday as a state holiday. In 1989 she advocated for Blacks to join the Urban League of Portland.

In 1998, she was a candidate for the office of Oregon Superintendent of Public Instruction, but lost to Stan Bunn. Carter was a member of the Oregon House until January 1999, when term limits prevented her from seeking additional terms. In November 1999, she became the president of the Urban League of Portland, serving until May 2002. Also in 1999 she retired from Portland Community College. She was then elected to the Senate in November 2000. In 2005, she became president pro tempore of the Oregon State Senate and was unopposed in the 2008 election.

In 2010, she was awarded the Legislator of the Year Award from the Oregon Library Association.

== Later life ==
She resigned from the Oregon Senate in 2009 in order to take a job at the Oregon Department of Human Services. The hiring was criticized since the new position paid $121,872 annually, which, along with other similar moves to the public sector by other legislators, led to the introduction of several bills to curtail such practices. None of the bills ever became law. Carter became director of community engagement in 2012 and saw her salary decreased.

== Electoral history ==
2004 Oregon State Senator, 22nd district
Party	Candidate	Votes	%
Democratic	Margaret Carter	46,514	97.3
Write-in		1,273	2.7
Total votes		47,787	100%

2008 Oregon State Senator, 22nd district
Party	Candidate	Votes	%
Democratic	Margaret Carter	48,939	98.2
Write-in		921	1.8
Total votes		49,860	100%

== See also ==
- Seventy-third Oregon Legislative Assembly (2005–2006)
- Seventy-fourth Oregon Legislative Assembly (2007–2008)
- Seventy-fifth Oregon Legislative Assembly (2009–2010)
