= Michael J. McShane =

American judge (born 1961)

Michael McShane
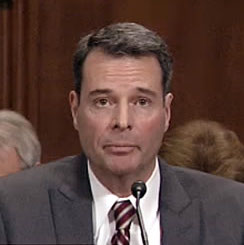

Chief Judge of the United States District Court for the District of Oregon
- Incumbent
- Assumed office January 1, 2024
- Preceded by: Marco A. Hernandez

Judge of the United States District Court for the District of Oregon
- Incumbent
- Assumed office May 30, 2013
- Appointed by: Barack Obama
- Preceded by: Michael Hogan

Personal details
- Born: Michael Jerome McShane; 1961 (age 64–65) Pittsburgh, Pennsylvania, U.S.
- Education: Gonzaga University (BA); Lewis and Clark College (JD)

Michael J. McShane (born 1961) is an American lawyer serving as the chief United States district judge of the United States District Court for the District of Oregon. He previously served as a state court judge on the Oregon Multnomah County Circuit Court from 2001 to 2013.

== Early life, education and career ==
McShane was born in 1961 in Pittsburgh, in a conservative Catholic family. He grew up in Kennewick, Washington, where he attended high school.

McShane graduated from Gonzaga University in 1983 with a Bachelor of Arts degree magna cum laude. He then joined the Jesuit Volunteer Corps Northwest and spent two years in Portland, Oregon, as a corrections counselor. He left the Jesuit Volunteer Corps in 1985 to attend Lewis & Clark Law School, graduating in 1988 with a Juris Doctor cum laude.

He had worked for the Clark County District Attorney's office during law school but, on graduating, McShane joined the Office of the Metropolitan Public Defender in Portland, where he worked from 1988 to 1997.

== Judicial service ==
=== State judicial service ===
He served as a full-time Judge Pro Tempore on the Multnomah County Circuit Court from 1997 to 2001 and as a Judge on the same court from 2001 to 2013. He handled civil, criminal and family court cases. He received the Oregon State Bar President's Public Service Award in 2012.

=== Federal judicial service ===
On September 19, 2012, President Barack Obama nominated McShane to serve as a United States District Judge for the United States District Court for the District of Oregon, to the seat vacated by Judge Michael R. Hogan who assumed senior status on September 24, 2011. On January 2, 2013, his nomination was returned to the President, due to the sine die adjournment of the Senate. On January 3, 2013, he was renominated to the same office. His nomination was reported by the Senate Judiciary Committee on March 7, 2013, by voice vote. The Senate confirmed his nomination on May 20, 2013, by voice vote. He received his commission on May 30, 2013. He became chief judge on January 1, 2024.

==== Same-sex marriage ruling ====
On May 19, 2014, McShane struck down Oregon's same-sex marriage ban in Geiger v. Kitzhaber. He ordered that the state immediately issue licenses to same-sex couples. The State of Oregon did not appeal (Oregon Attorney General Ellen Rosenblum declined to defend the state's ban on same-sex marriage); same-sex marriage in Oregon was legalized as a result.

==== Public defense crisis ====
On August 15, 2023, McShane ordered the Washington County sheriff to release all defendants from jail if they had been held for 10 days without a lawyer. This was amidst a long-standing crisis in the state's unique public defender system whereby the state and not the county paid for and contracted for public defense services via third party nonprofits creating a shortage of public defenders.

== Personal life ==
McShane is openly gay, and he is the first openly gay federal judge in Oregon. His partner is Gregory Ford, and they have a son.

McShane sits on the boards of The Wayne Morse Center for Law and Politics at the University of Oregon and the Jesuit Volunteer Corps Northwest. He previously sat on the board of St. Andrew Nativity School, an inner city middle school in Portland for disadvantaged youth. He taught criminal practice and trial advocacy at Lewis & Clark Law School and is a frequent lecturer at law schools and bar associations in Oregon.

== See also ==
- List of LGBT people from Portland, Oregon
- List of LGBT jurists in the United States
- List of Oregon judges

Legal offices
Preceded by Michael Hogan	Judge of the United States District Court for the District of Oregon; 2013–present	Incumbent
Preceded by Marco A. Hernandez	Chief Judge of the United States District Court for the District of Oregon; 2024–present	Incumbent
