= Garr King =

American judge and lawyer (1936–2019)

Garr Michael King
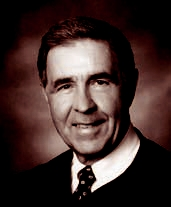

Senior Judge of the United States District Court for the District of Oregon
- In office January 30, 2009 – February 5, 2019

Judge of the United States District Court for the District of Oregon
- In office April 27, 1998 – January 30, 2009
- Appointed by: Bill Clinton
- Preceded by: Helen J. Frye
- Succeeded by: Marco A. Hernandez

Personal details
- Born: Garr Michael King; January 28, 1936 Pocatello, Idaho
- Died: February 5, 2019 (aged 83) Portland, Oregon
- Education: University of Utah; Northwestern School of Law of Lewis & Clark College (LLB)

Garr Michael King (January 28, 1936 – February 5, 2019) was a lawyer and United States district judge of the United States District Court for the District of Oregon.

== Education and career ==
King was born on January 28, 1936 in Pocatello, Idaho. He moved to Salt Lake City, Utah at a young age and served in the Marine Corps from 1954 to 1957 after high school. He spent one year stationed in Japan.

After attending the University of Utah, he received a Bachelor of Laws from Northwestern School of Law of Lewis & Clark College in 1963. He was a Deputy district attorney of District Attorney's Office Multnomah County, Oregon from 1963 to 1966. He was in private practice of law in Portland, Oregon at Morrison and Bailey from 1966 to 1973. In 1973, he formed a law partnership with Jack L. Kennedy, who he had met at Northwestern School of Law of Lewis & Clark College, and was selected for a judgeship in 1998. King was president of the Multnomah Bar Association from 1975 to 1976.

== Federal judicial service ==
King was a United States District Judge of the United States District Court for the District of Oregon. King was nominated by President Bill Clinton on October 8, 1997, to a seat vacated by Helen J. Frye. He was confirmed by the United States Senate on April 27, 1998, and received commission on April 30, 1998. He assumed senior status on January 30, 2009, and was succeeded by Judge Marco A. Hernandez. He died on February 5, 2019.

=== Notable cases ===
==== United States vs. Mohamed Osman Mohamud ====
King presided over the trial of Mohamed Osman Mohamud, a Somali-American student arrested by the FBI in a 2010 sting, after he tried to set off what he thought was a bomb at a tree-lighting ceremony at Pioneer Courthouse Square in Portland.

A jury found Mohamud guilty in 2013, and King imposed a 30-year prison sentence in 2014.

==== Al-Haramain Islamic Foundation vs. United States Department of Treasury ====
King presided over the lawsuit filed by Al-Haramain Islamic Foundation of Oregon, based in Ashland, against the U.S. Treasury Department. The Treasury froze the assets of the charity after listing it as a "specially designated global terrorist organization" in 2004. King ruled in favor of Al-Haramain Islamic Foundation, saying that it failed to receive adequate notice of the characterization and did not have a chance to challenge it.

King also expressed frustration at the U.S. government's actions, saying:

"Now the government, basically, all through this, just wouldn't give them any information; would not admit that there was a (wiretapping) program even though Bush had announced that there was a program. Even my law clerks couldn't look at these documents. That had to be put in what they called a 'skiff' (from the term "sensitive, compartmented information facility"). They were under lock and key of the government. When I was to read them, they would have a person bring them in and put them here."

Legal offices
Preceded by Helen J. Frye	Judge of the United States District Court for the District of Oregon; 1998–2009	Succeeded by Marco A. Hernandez
