= Jack Morris (Jesuit) =

John "Jack" Morris S.J.

Personal details
- Born: John James Morris; October 22, 1927 Anaconda, Montana, U.S.
- Died: September 30, 2012 (Age 84) Spokane, Washington, U.S.
- Education: Regis University

John James "Jack" Morris, S.J. (October 22, 1927 – September 30, 2012) was an American Jesuit priest who founded the Jesuit Volunteer Corps in 1956. The Jesuit Volunteer Corps is an organization founded specifically for young, lay volunteer college graduates, who embark in one or more years of voluntary community service. Approximately 150 individuals enroll in the Jesuit Volunteer Corps each year.

== Early life ==
Morris was born to John and Violet (née Murphy) Morris on October 22, 1927, in Anaconda, Montana. He was the second of three brothers; his older brother was Patrick Morris and his younger sibling was Robert Morris. He enlisted in the United States Navy after completing high school. Morris initially attended Georgetown University, pursuing a largely secular academic and social life, which included a college girlfriend. However, Morris soon transferred to Regis College, now known as Regis University, in Denver, Colorado, to begin the steps to become a priest.

In August 1950, Morris entered the Society of Jesus at the Jesuit Novitiate located in Sheridan, Oregon. He was ordained as a Catholic priest in Spokane, Washington, on June 16, 1962.

Morris worked on fledgling project involving a small school, the Copper Valley School, a Native Alaskan boarding school in Glennallen, Alaska, during the mid-1950s. That small project led Morris to establish the Jesuit Volunteer Corps, a volunteer organization which sends young adults to poor communities throughout the United States, in 1956. Morris is also credited with creating the name, "Jesuit Volunteer Corps", for the organization.

== Activism ==
Father Morris became interested in nuclear non-proliferation during the 1970s when he became acquainted with protesters gathered outside the Bangor Trident Base in Bangor, Washington. Among the activists whom Morris befriended was Father George Zabelka, a Catholic priest who had served as the chaplain for the crew of the Enola Gay, which dropped the atomic bomb on Hiroshima during World War II.

In 1982, Morris began leading the 6,500 mile Bethlehem Peace Pilgrimage from Washington state in the U.S. to draw attention to the proliferation of nuclear weapons and promote peace within a Christian tradition. The walk, which became known as the Bethlehem Peace Pilgrimage, would take twenty months to complete. His inspiration for the walk included one particular teaching of Jesus, "But I say unto you, love your enemies, bless them that curse you, do good to them that hate you, and pray for them that despitefully use you and persecute you."

Morris spearheaded the idea and enlisted supporters, including Father Zabelka, to join the walk to Bethlehem in the West Bank. The group began their walk at what is now called the Bangor Naval Base in Bremerton, Washington, on April 9, 1982, which was also Good Friday. Morris said that the Good Friday starting date was symbolic because he believed that nuclear weapons had the potential to "crucify the entire human race." The youngest walker participating was twenty years old, while the oldest was sixty-seven. They slept in private homes and churches, and covered approximately twenty miles per day. In a 1982 interview with the Associated Press, Morris stated that reaction to the walk was largely positive. He recounted only a few instances when hecklers would yell insults such as "Go do it in Russia" at the group.

The group arrived in Washington D.C. just before the winter of 1982. They rested before flying to Ireland, where they continued their march to Bethlehem. The walk took them through eleven countries, including Yugoslavia and nations within the Middle East.

Morris' group arrived in Bethlehem on December 24, 1983. All the participants who began the walk in Washington were able to complete the walk all the way to Bethlehem. In 2012, Morris recounted that he was glad the pilgrimage was over because, "I was tired of walking."

Each year, new Jesuit Volunteer Corps trainees are given a presentation on the Bethlehem Peace Pilgrimage and the values the walk represents as part of their initial training.

== Later life ==
Morris also founded the Senior Chore Service, which serves low income senior citizens. Morris opened the Senior Chore Service during the early 1980s in conjunction with Catholic Charities of Seattle.

He then worked with refugees in Uganda throughout the 1990s. In 2002, Morris was sent back to the United States, where he served as a parish priest in Rockaway Beach, Oregon, until his retirement due to declining health.

In 2012, Morris celebrated his 50th anniversary as a Jesuit. He was writing a memoir, as of August 2012, at his residence at the Jesuit House infirmary on the campus of Gonzaga University.

== Morris's Passing ==
Father Morris died from cancer at the Jesuit infirmary in Spokane, Washington, on September 30, 2012, at the age of 84. His funeral was held at Gonzaga University with burial at the Jesuit's Oregon Province Cemetery. He was survived by his two brothers, Patrick and Robert.
