= Oregon's 43rd House district =

Legislative districts in the state of Oregon

Oregon's 43rd House district after redistricting after the 2020 Census

District 43 of the Oregon House of Representatives is one of 60 House legislative districts in the state of Oregon. As of 2021, the district is located entirely within Multnomah County and includes parts of north and northeast Portland. The current representative for the district is Democrat Tawna Sanchez of Portland.

== Election results ==
District boundaries have changed over time. Therefore, representatives before 2021 may not represent the same constituency as today. General election results from 2000 to present are as follows:

Year	Candidate	Party	Percent	Opponent	Party	Percent	Opponent	Party	Percent	Write-in percentage
2000	Cedric Lee Hayden	Republican	58.29%	Francisca Johnson	Democratic	41.71%	No third candidate			
2002 (Note: Deborah Kafoury was the incumbent in this election. She previously represented District 18, but was moved to this district due to redistricting following the 2000 United States census.)	Deborah Kafoury	Democratic	85.19%	Shirley Whitehead Freeman	Republican	10.53%	Herb Booth	Libertarian	3.77%	0.51%
2004	Chip Shields	Democratic	88.29%	Shirley Whitehead Freeman	Republican	11.71%	No third candidate			
2006	Chip Shields	Democratic	97.99%	Unopposed						2.01%
2008	Chip Shields	Democratic	98.46%	Unopposed						1.54%
2010 (Note: Lew Frederick was the incumbent in this election. He was appointed to this seat on October 30, 2009 to replace Chip Shields, who resigned to take an appointment to the 22nd district seat in the Oregon Senate.)	Lew Frederick	Democratic	98.30%	Unopposed						1.70%
2012	Lew Frederick	Democratic	97.98%	Unopposed						2.02%
2014	Lew Frederick	Democratic	97.46%	Unopposed						2.54%
2016	Tawna Sanchez	Democratic	98.55%	Unopposed						1.45%
2018	Tawna Sanchez	Democratic	98.68%	Unopposed						1.32%
2020	Tawna Sanchez	Democratic	98.80%	Unopposed						1.21%
2022	Tawna Sanchez	Democratic	91.80%	Tim LeMaster	Republican	8.07%	No third candidate			0.13%
2024	Tawna Sanchez	Democratic	92.1%	Tim LeMaster	Republican	7.6%	No third candidate			0.2%

== See also ==
- Oregon Legislative Assembly
- Oregon House of Representatives
