= Tawna Sanchez =

American politician from Oregon

The Honorable Tawna Sanchez
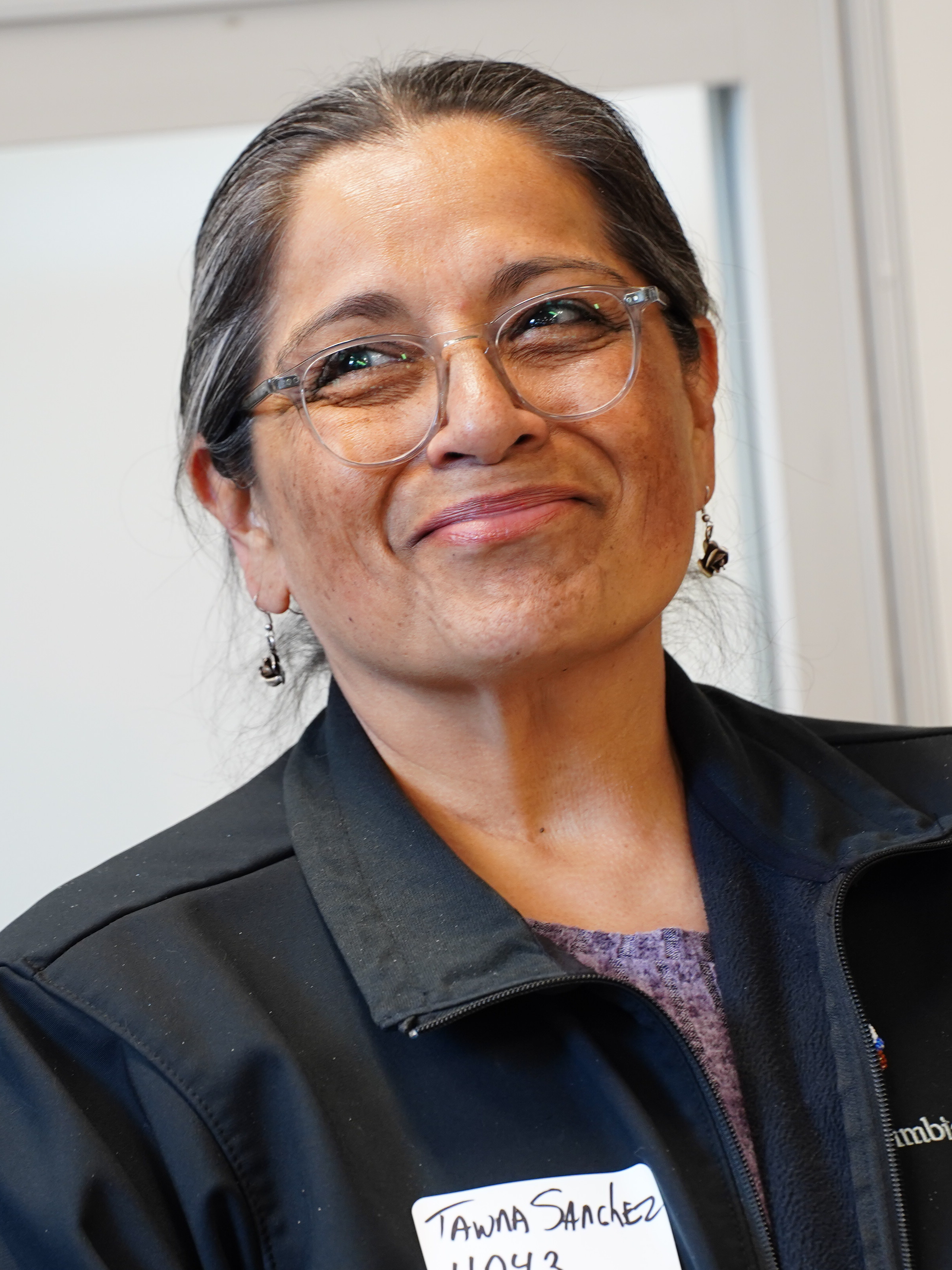
- Sanchez in 2024

Member of the Oregon House of Representatives from the 43rd district
- Incumbent
- Assumed office January 9, 2017
- Preceded by: Lew Frederick

Personal details
- Born: Tawna Dee Sanchez; August 23, 1961 (age 65) Portland, Oregon, U.S.
- Party: Democratic
- Education: Marylhurst University (BA); Portland State University (MA)
- Tawna Sanchez's voice Sanchez receiving an award from the League of Minority Voters of Oregon; Recorded May 18, 2024

Tawna Dee Sanchez (born August 23, 1961) is an American politician, currently serving as a member of the Oregon House of Representatives. She represents the 43rd district, which covers parts of north-central Portland.

== Early life and education ==
Sanchez was born and raised in Portland, Oregon. Sanchez is of Shoshone-Bannock, Ute, and Carrizo descent and was the second person of Native American descent elected to serve in the Oregon legislature (following Jackie Taylor) and the first to represent Portland.

Sanchez graduated with a bachelor's degree from Marylhurst University and with a master's degree from Portland State University.

== Career ==
She has worked with the Native American Youth and Family Center for much of her life.

Sanchez has served on the Oregon Child Welfare Advisory Commission and the Oregon Family Services Review Commission.

She won election to the House in 2016, narrowly defeating Roberta Phillip-Robbins in the Democratic primary and running unopposed in the general election.

As of 2023 Sanchez is the co-chair of the Oregon legislature's joint Ways and Means committee, along with Senator Elizabeth Steiner.

== Electoral history ==
=== 2016 ===
2016 Oregon State Representative, 43rd district
Party	Candidate	Votes	%
Democratic	Tawna Sanchez	31,052	98.5
Write-in		457	1.5
Total votes		31,509	100%

=== 2018 ===
2018 Oregon State Representative, 43rd district
Party	Candidate	Votes	%
Democratic	Tawna Sanchez	31,885	98.7
Write-in		425	1.3
Total votes		32,310	100%

=== 2020 ===
2020 Oregon State Representative, 43rd district
Party	Candidate	Votes	%
Democratic	Tawna Sanchez	39,274	98.8
Write-in		479	1.2
Total votes		39,753	100%

=== 2022 ===
2022 Oregon State Representative, 43rd district Democratic primary
Party	Candidate	Votes	%
Democratic	Tawna Sanchez (incumbent)	13,247	99.34
Democratic	Write-in	88	0.66
Total votes		13,335	100.0

2022 Oregon State Representative, 43rd district
Party	Candidate	Votes	%
Democratic	Tawna Sanchez (incumbent)	33,466	91.80
Republican	Tim LeMaster	2,943	8.07
Write-in		48	0.13
Total votes		36,457	100.0

=== 2024 ===
2024 Oregon State Representative, 43rd district
Party	Candidate	Votes	%
Democratic	Tawna Sanchez (incumbent)	37,084	92.1
Republican	Tim LeMaster	3,078	7.6
Write-in		97	0.2
Total votes		40,259	100%

== See also ==
- Jackie Taylor
- List of Native American politicians
- Native American women in politics
