= Lew Frederick =

American politician (born 1951)

The Honorable Lew Frederick
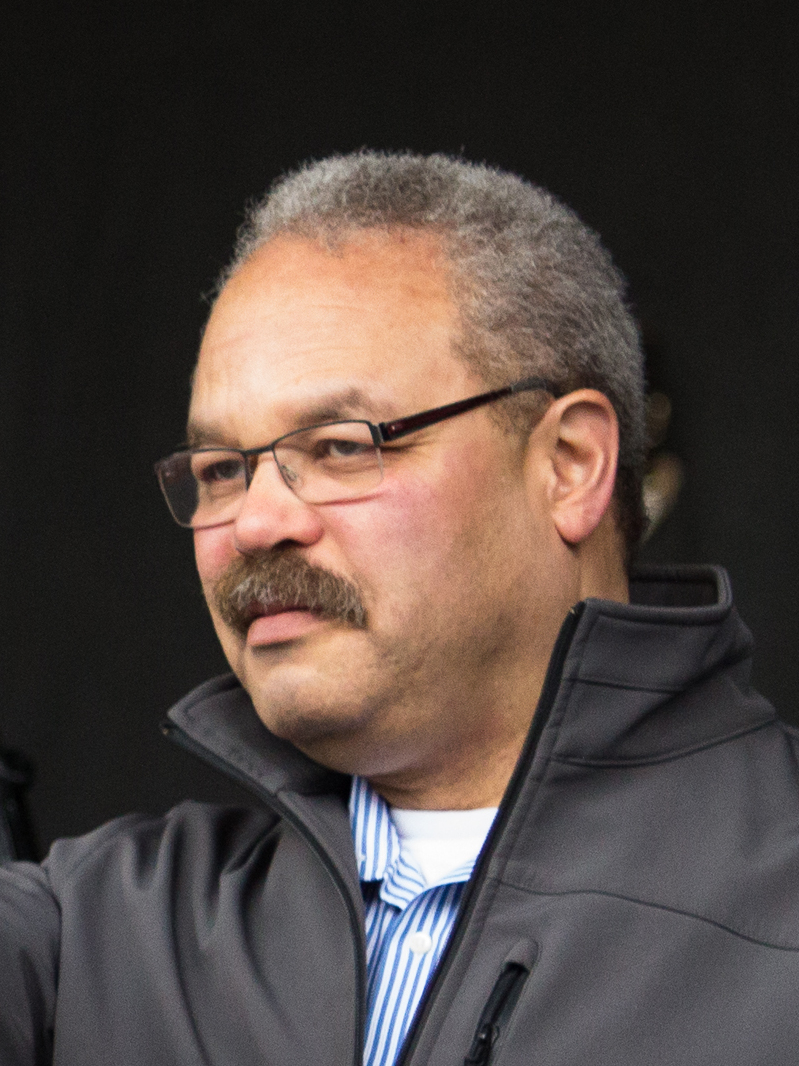
- Frederick in 2017

Member of the Oregon Senate from the 22nd district
- Incumbent
- Assumed office January 9, 2017
- Preceded by: Chip Shields

Member of the Oregon House of Representatives from the 43rd district
- In office October 2009 – January 9, 2017
- Succeeded by: Tawna Sanchez

Personal details
- Born: Lewis Reed Frederick; December 1951 (age 74) Pullman, Washington, U.S.
- Party: Democratic

Lew Frederick (born December 1951) is an American politician, who has represented the 22nd district in the Oregon Senate, covering North and Northeast Portland, since 2017. A member of the Democratic Party, he has been one of the two majority whips since 2021. He previously served in the Oregon House of Representatives from 2009 to 2017.

== Early life and education ==
Born in Pullman, Washington, Frederick grew up in Baton Rouge, Louisiana, and Atlanta, Georgia. Frederick is the son of botanist Dr. Lafayette Frederick, Professor Emeritus Howard University, and his wife. Frederick has lived in northeast Portland since 1974.

== Career ==
Throughout his career, he was a teacher at the Metropolitan Learning Center for two years, a radio and television reporter with KGW for seventeen years, Director of Public Information at Portland Public Schools for thirteen years, Assistant to the President at Portland Community College, and held a position on the State Board of Education. In October 2013, Frederick was awarded the Outstanding Alumni Award at Earlham College.

Frederick was sworn into the Oregon House of Representatives in October 2009 and began serving on the House Interim Human Services Committee and House Interim Sustainability & Economic Development Committee.

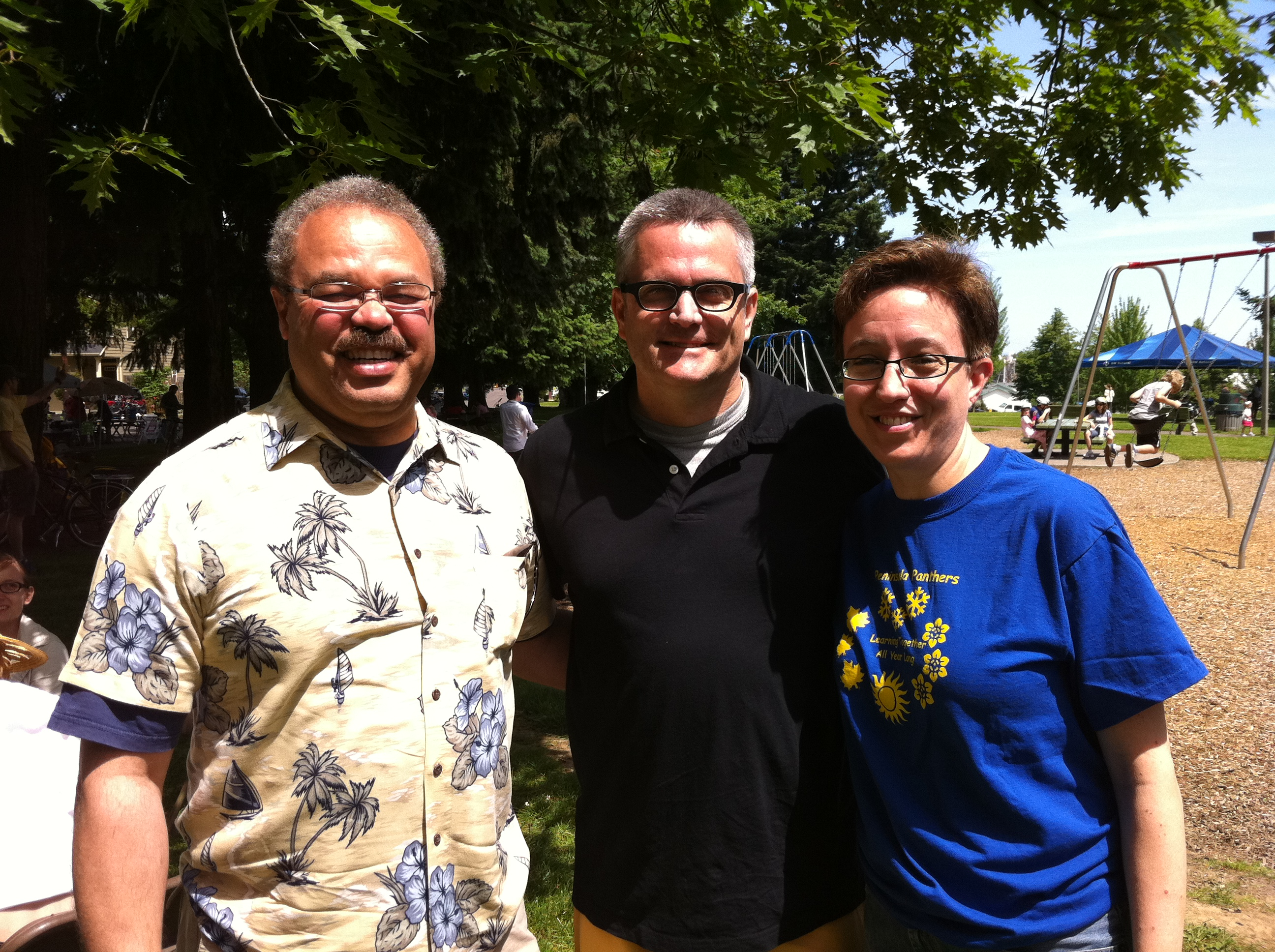
Frederick with Portland Mayor Sam Adams and State Representative (and future Governor) Tina Kotek in 2011

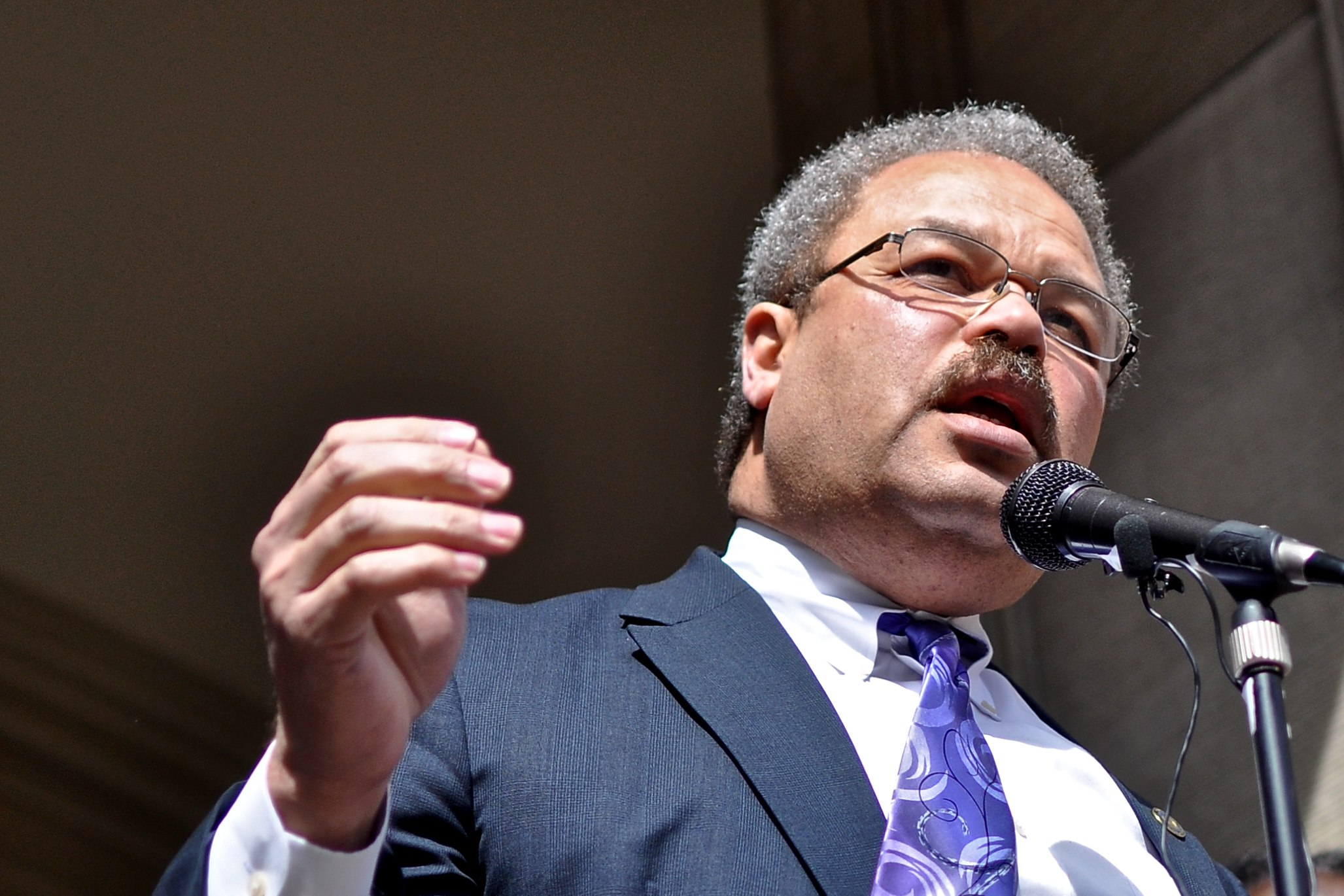
Frederick in 2012

According to the Portland Tribune, he was Oregon's "highest-ranking black leader and the only black man serving in the Oregon Legislature" as of 2010. Frederick, formerly a member of the House Joint Committee on Legislative Audits, Information Management and Technology, has moved into the leadership ranks through his new Committee assignments.

Since the 2021 legislative session, Frederick has served as one of the Oregon Senate's two majority whips, a position to which he was elected by the Senate Democratic caucus in November 2020 and has held since. In April 2023, Senate President Rob Wagner named Frederick interim co-chair of the Joint Committee on Transportation, replacing Senator Chris Gorsek, as the committee weighed funding for the Rose Quarter expansion and the I-5 bridge replacement.

In 2021, Frederick introduced and carried Senate Concurrent Resolution 22, which offered an official apology from the Legislative Assembly to Robert Parker Jr., a former legislative committee administrator, for the denial of his admission to the Oregon State Bar. In 1987, opponents of a bill handled by Parker's committee had alleged misconduct on his part, but state and county investigations found no proof. After Parker passed the bar exam in 1990, the Board of Bar Examiners recommended denying admission, citing the earlier allegations. Frederick's resolution cited "racism and institutional bias," that Parker had engaged in no wrong-doing, and asked the Oregon Supreme Court to admit him to the bar.

In the 2024 session, Frederick introduced Senate Bill 1583, which would have barred school board and district staff from removing textbooks or library books solely because they feature people from groups protected by anti-discrimination law. The bill drew more than 500 written testimonies within a day of its hearing. Frederick said he had not consulted educators or librarians in drafting it and was surprised by the response. The bill did not pass before the session ended, and Frederick said he planned to reintroduce it.

Frederick supports reparations for the descendants of slaves. In January 2021, he introduced two bills in the Oregon Senate: Senate Bill 618, which would have examined whether a case for reparations exists, and Senate Bill 619, which would have directed the Oregon Department of Revenue to establish a program of payments to Black Oregonians who could demonstrate heritage in slavery. As introduced, SB 619 provided for an annuity with a principal of $123,000, paid annually for the life of the recipient. According to KTVZ, Frederick's chief of staff clarified that the $123,000 was the total value of the annuity rather than an amount to be paid each year. Frederick described the figure as a starting point for negotiation. Both bills stalled in the Senate and did not advance.

Frederick also sponsored Senate Joint Memorial 4, which urged Congress to enact legislation to study reparations for African-Americans.

== Electoral history ==
2010 Oregon State Representative, 43rd district
Party	Candidate	Votes	%
Democratic	Lew Frederick	19,821	98.3
Write-in		345	1.7
Total votes		20,166	100%

2012 Oregon State Representative, 43rd district
Party	Candidate	Votes	%
Democratic	Lew Frederick	27,623	98.0
Write-in		569	2.0
Total votes		28,192	100%

2014 Oregon State Representative, 43rd district
Party	Candidate	Votes	%
Democratic	Lew Frederick	21,553	97.5
Write-in		561	2.5
Total votes		22,114	100%

2016 Oregon State Senator, 22nd district
Party	Candidate	Votes	%
Democratic	Lew Frederick	60,803	91.6
Libertarian	Eugene A Newell Jr	5,321	8.0
Write-in		290	0.4
Total votes		66,414	100%

2020 Oregon State Senator, 22nd district
Party	Candidate	Votes	%
Democratic	Lew Frederick	70,489	98.1
Write-in		1,401	1.9
Total votes		71,890	100%

2024 Oregon State Senator, 22nd district
Party	Candidate	Votes	%
Democratic	Lew Frederick	66,859	90.5
Republican	Michael Saperstein	6,838	9.3
Write-in		149	0.2
Total votes		73,846	100%

== See also ==
- 76th Oregon Legislative Assembly
