= Jesuit Volunteer Corps Northwest =

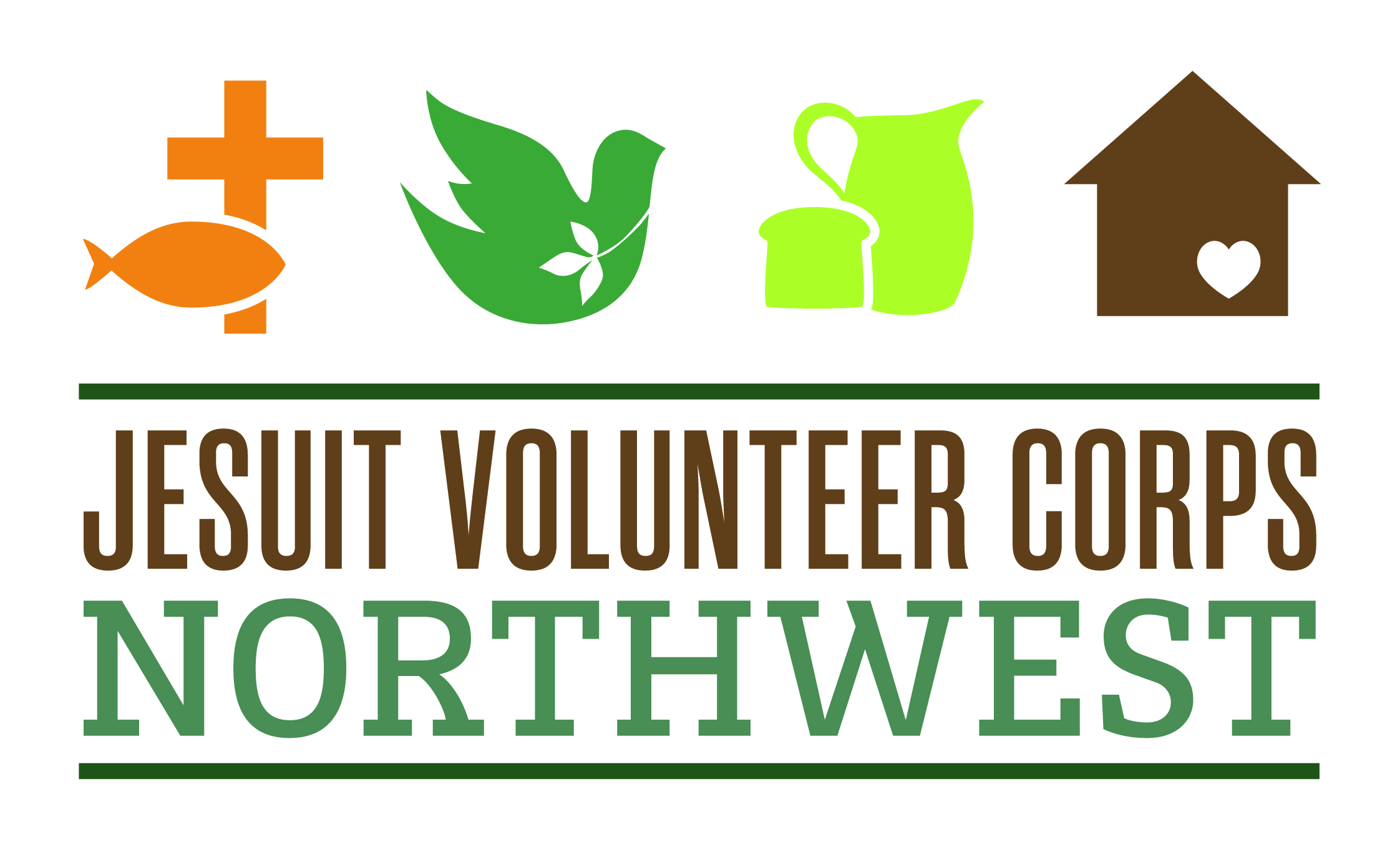
Logo

Jesuit Volunteer Corps (JVC) Northwest connects people with one or more years of volunteer service that focus on JVC Northwest's values of community, spirituality/reflection, simple living, and social & ecological justice. JVC Northwest provides opportunities for individuals to reach out to persons living on the margins of society and vulnerable places throughout the Pacific Northwest. Jesuit Volunteers live together and serve with partner agencies in both rural and urban locales throughout Alaska, Idaho, Montana, Oregon and Washington.

== History ==
Jesuit Volunteer Corps Northwest started in 1956 with several committed volunteers who built and taught in the newly formed Copper Valley School for Alaska Native and non-Native children. Under the sponsorship of the Oregon Province of the Society of Jesus (Jesuits), the Jesuit Volunteers expanded out of Alaska in the 1960s. They began living and working with Native American communities throughout the Northwest region, as well as serving in inner city placements in Washington and Oregon and beyond. From its roots in the Northwest, the Jesuit Volunteer Corps has spread throughout the United States and abroad. Over the past 65 years, over 12,000 individuals have served as Jesuit Volunteers through JVC and JVC Northwest, with more than 7,000 of those serving in the Northwest.

Between 1974 and 1980, Jesuit Volunteer Corps established new chapters as it expanded beyond the Northwest: International, South, Southwest, East, and Midwest. In 2009, five of the six Jesuit Volunteer Corps organizations merged to form an organization called Jesuit Volunteer Corps to share resources for one common mission. JVC Northwest made a decision to remain an independent region when the remaining chapters decided to unite. Both groups continue to collaborate. JVC Northwest states its commitment to providing well-supported volunteers to address the most urgent needs in the Pacific Northwest.

Leading up to 2010, through JVC Northwest's partnership with Catholic Volunteer Network (CVN), Jesuit Volunteers were eligible to receive the AmeriCorps Segal Education Award. In 2010, JVC Northwest received a three-year National Direct AmeriCorps award with a focus on capacity building, which has been renewed each subsequent cycle since. In 2022, JVC Northwest received a new Public Health AmeriCorps grant which focuses on increasing access to medical care in marginalized communities through outreach and accompaniment.

As an AmeriCorps partner, Jesuit Volunteers serving in AmeriCorps positions receive additional benefits including a living stipend, student loan forbearance and an education award upon the completion of their service year and 1700 hours of service. As of 2023 the AmeriCorps Education Award is $6,895.

In 2012, JV Northwest began the JV EnCorps program to provide Northwest communities with the service and gifts of older adults who are dedicated to social and ecological justice. JV EnCorps members contribute part-time service and gather together monthly for reflection and formation on the Ignatian values of community, spirituality, simple living and social and ecological justice. As of 2023, there are seven JV EnCorps groups in six Northwest cities.

With the advent of the JV and JV EnCorps programs, JVC Northwest intends to bring intergenerational opportunities for service and contribute to more just and equitable communities in the Pacific Northwest.

As part of its ongoing diversity, equity, and inclusion work, in 2021 JVC Northwest released an Acknowledgment of History which unpacks its complex history.

== Mission and values ==
JVC Northwest recruits and supports volunteers in Northwestern United States. JVC Northwest's core values are stated as "community, simple living, social and ecological justice, and spirituality".

== See also ==
- Jesuit Volunteer Corps
