= Chip Shields =

American politician (born 1967)

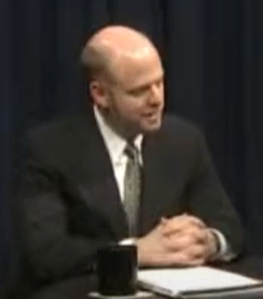
- Shields in 2013

Member of the Oregon Senate from the 22nd district
- In office January 12, 2009 – January 9, 2017
- Preceded by: Margaret Carter
- Succeeded by: Lew Frederick

Member of the Oregon House of Representatives
- In office 2004 – 2009

Personal details
- Born: William Matthew Shields II; 1967 (age 58–59) St. Louis, Missouri, U.S.
- Party: Democratic
- Education: Portland State University
- Chip Shields' voice Shields being interviewed by Bruce Broussard; Recorded February 1, 2013

William "Chip" Shields (born 1967) is an American politician who served as a member of the Oregon State Senate from September 2009 until 2017. He had previously represented District 43 in the Oregon House of Representatives from 2004 until his appointment to replace Margaret Carter to represent Senate District 22.

Shields was elected in a 2010 special election, and reelected in 2012. He retired in 2016.

== Electoral history ==
2004 Oregon State Representative, 43rd district
Party	Candidate	Votes	%
Democratic	Chip Shields	26,285	87.6
Republican	Shirley (Whitehead) Freeman	3,487	11.6
Write-in		229	0.8
Total votes		30,001	100%

2006 Oregon State Representative, 43rd district
Party	Candidate	Votes	%
Democratic	Chip Shields	18,340	98.0
Write-in		378	2.0
Total votes		18,718	100%

2008 Oregon State Representative, 43rd district
Party	Candidate	Votes	%
Democratic	Chip Shields	26,051	98.5
Write-in		408	1.5
Total votes		26,459	100%

2010 Oregon State Senator, 22nd district
Party	Candidate	Votes	%
Democratic	Chip Shields	40,101	88.0
Republican	Dwayne E Runyan	5,345	11.7
Write-in		142	0.3
Total votes		45,588	100%

2012 Oregon State Senator, 22nd district
Party	Candidate	Votes	%
Democratic	Chip Shields	55,017	91.6
Libertarian	Herbert Booth	4,693	7.8
Write-in		335	0.6
Total votes		60,045	100%
