= Helen J. Frye =

American judge

Senior Judge of the United States District Court for the District of Oregon
- In office December 10, 1995 – April 21, 2011

Judge of the United States District Court for the District of Oregon
- In office February 20, 1980 – December 10, 1995
- Appointed by: Jimmy Carter
- Preceded by: Seat established by 92 Stat. 1629
- Succeeded by: Garr King

Personal details
- Born: Helen Elizabeth Jackson; December 10, 1930 Klamath Falls, Oregon, US
- Died: April 21, 2011 (aged 80) Portland, Oregon, US
- Children: E. Max Frye
- Education: University of Oregon (BA, MA); University of Oregon School of Law (JD)

Helen Jackson Frye (December 10, 1930 – April 21, 2011) was an American judge and attorney in the state of Oregon. She served as a judge of the Oregon Circuit Court and later as a United States district judge of the United States District Court for the District of Oregon.

== Early life ==
Helen Jackson was born in Klamath Falls, Oregon on December 10, 1930, the daughter of Elizabeth (Kirkpatrick) and Earl Jackson. She grew up on a potato and grain farm in Klamath County. Her father died when she was three, and she was raised by her maternal grandparents from age three to nine while her mother and sibling recovered from tuberculosis. Her mother remarried and they moved from the family farm.

After high school she attended the University of Oregon where she graduated in 1953 with a Bachelor of Arts degree in English and served as class president of her sophomore class. To pay for school, Frye worked as a babysitter and a waitress. She was a member of Phi Beta Kappa. After graduation, she taught in public schools. In 1961, Frye earned a Master of Arts at the University of Oregon. She graduated from the University of Oregon School of Law in 1966 with a Juris Doctor. She had three children with her first husband Bill Frye: Karen, Heidi, and filmmaker E. Max Frye.

== Legal career ==
After passing the bar in 1966 she entered private legal practice in Eugene, and worked for her husband, who was the district attorney for Lane County. In 1971, Frye left private practice and became a judge for the Oregon Circuit Court’s second district covering Lane County. Oregon Governor Tom McCall appointed her to the position, and she became the first female judge of the Oregon Circuit Courts. Helen and Bill divorced in 1975, with Helen remarrying to Perry Holloman. She remained on that court after winning election to a full term and re-election until 1980, when she became a judge for a new seat on the United States District Court for the District of Oregon

In 1973, as circuit court judge Frye she presided over the trial of Dayton Leroy Rogers, who was found not guilty by reason of mental defect. Rogers was sent to the Oregon State Hospital, was released on December 12, 1974, and then went on to kill several women before being sent to death row.

== Federal judicial service ==
Frye was nominated by President Jimmy Carter on December 3, 1979, to the United States District Court for the District of Oregon, to a new seat created by 92 Stat. 1629. She was confirmed by the United States Senate on February 20, 1980, and received her commission the same day, becoming the first female federal judge in Oregon. She assumed senior status on December 10, 1995, serving in that status until her death, but was inactive her final years.

== Notable cases ==
Frye presided over the case that voided the incorporation of the community of Rajneeshpuram in Central Oregon. She also dismissed a case concerning the protection of the northern spotted owl from logging in 1989. In 1992, she was the trial court level judge for Kyllo v. United States, an unlawful search case that made it to the United States Supreme Court in 2001.

== Later years and death ==
Frye was awarded the Meritorious Service Award from the University of Oregon School of Law in 2000. Helen Frye died on April 21, 2011, in Portland, Oregon.

Legal offices
Preceded by Seat established by 92 Stat. 1629	Judge of the United States District Court for the District of Oregon; 1980–1995	Succeeded by Garr King
