= Oregon's 6th congressional district =

U.S. House district for Oregon

- Interactive map of district boundaries since January 3, 2023
- Representative: Andrea Salinas; D–Tigard
- Population (2025): 717,325
- Median household income: $91,294
- Ethnicity: 66.7% White; 20.8% Hispanic; 5.6% Two or more races; 3.5% Asian; 1.2% Black; 0.9% Native American; 0.8% Pacific Islander Americans; 0.5% other
- Cook PVI: D+6

Oregon's 6th congressional district is a congressional district created after the 2020 United States census. It consists of Polk and Yamhill Counties, in addition to portions of Marion, Clackamas, and Washington Counties. It takes in all of urban Salem, the state's capital, as well as the southwestern suburbs of Portland.

The district elected a member of the United States House of Representatives beginning with the 2022 elections. There were originally sixteen candidates that entered in the race, more than for any other congressional seat in the state in 2022.

== History ==
On September 27, 2021, Oregon adopted a redistricting plan to be used in the 2022 elections onwards. That plan carved a new 6th congressional district out of parts of the former first and fifth districts. The district had a PVI rating of D+6, as of April 2025.

== Composition ==
For the 118th and successive Congresses (based on redistricting following the 2020 census), the district contains all or portions of the following counties and communities:

Clackamas County (4)

Lake Oswego (part; also 5th, shared with Multnomah and Washington counties), Rivergrove, Tualatin (shared with Washington County), Wilsonville (shared with Washington County)

Marion County (16)

Aumsville, Aurora, Brooks (part; also 5th), Butteville, Donald, Four Corners (part; also 5th), Gervais, Hayesville (part; also 5th), Hubbard, Jefferson, Keizer, Marion, Salem (part; also 5th; shared with Polk County), St. Paul, Turner, Woodburn

Polk County (10)

All 10 communities

Washington County (12)

Beaverton (part; also 1st), Bull Mountain (part; also 1st), Durham, Garden Home-Whitford, King City, Lake Oswego (part; also 5th; shared with Clackamas and Multnomah counties), Metzger, Raleigh Hills (part; also 1st), Sherwood, Tigard (part; also 1st), Tualatin (shared with Clackamas County), Wilsonville (shared with Clackamas County)

Yamhill County (12)

All 12 communities

== List of members representing the district ==
| Representative | Party | Term | Cong ress | Electoral history | District location |
|---|---|---|---|---|---|
District established January 3, 2023
| Andrea Salinas (Tigard) | Democratic | January 3, 2023 – present | 118th 119th | Elected in 2022. Re-elected in 2024. Re-elected in 2026. | 2023–present Polk and Yamhill; parts of Clackamas, Marion, and Washington |

== Recent election results from statewide races ==
| Year | Office | Results |
|---|---|---|
| 2008 | President | Obama 53% - 45% |
| 2012 | President | Obama 51% - 49% |
| 2016 | President | Clinton 47% - 41% |
| 2016 | Senate | Wyden 53% - 37% |
| 2016 | Governor (Spec.) | Pierce 49% - 46% |
| 2016 | Attorney General | Rosenblum 52% - 45% |
| 2018 | Governor | Brown 47.1% - 46.8% |
| 2020 | President | Biden 55% - 42% |
| 2020 | Senate | Merkley 55% - 41% |
| 2020 | Secretary of State | Fagan 48% - 46% |
| 2020 | Treasurer | Read 50% - 44% |
| 2020 | Attorney General | Rosenblum 54% - 43% |
| 2022 | Senate | Wyden 53% - 44% |
| 2022 | Governor | Drazan 46% - 44% |
| 2024 | President | Harris 54% - 42% |
| 2024 | Secretary of State | Read 53% - 44% |
| 2024 | Treasurer | Steiner 47% - 45% |
| 2024 | Attorney General | Rayfield 52% - 48% |

== Election results ==
=== 2022 ===
2022 Oregon's 6th congressional district election
| Party | Candidate | Votes | % |
|---|---|---|---|
| Democratic | Andrea Salinas | 147,156 | 50.0 |
| Republican | Mike Erickson | 139,946 | 47.5 |
| Constitution | Larry McFarland | 6,762 | 2.3 |
| Write-in | | 513 | 0.2 |
| Total votes | | 294,377 | 100.0 |
| Democratic win (new seat) | | | |

=== 2024 ===
2024 United States House election: Oregon District 6
| Party | Candidate | Votes | % |
|---|---|---|---|
| Democratic | Andrea Salinas (incumbent) | 180,869 | 53.3 |
| Republican | Mike Erickson | 157,634 | 46.5 |
| Write-in | | 562 | 0.2 |
| Total votes | | 339,065 | 100% |
