= 2024 Oregon Attorney General election =

- November 5, 2024
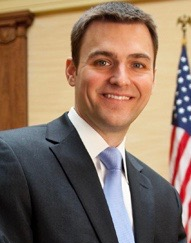

Candidate	Dan Rayfield	Will Lathrop
Party	Democratic	Republican
Popular vote	1,156,489	967,964
Percentage	54.37%	45.51%
- Rayfield: 50–60% 60–70% 70–80% 80–90% >90% Lathrop: 50–60% 60–70% 70–80% 80–90% >90% Tie: 50% No votes
Attorney General before election
Ellen Rosenblum
Democratic
Elected Attorney General
Dan Rayfield
Democratic

The 2024 Oregon Attorney General election was held on November 5, 2024, to elect the attorney general of Oregon. Incumbent Democratic attorney general Ellen Rosenblum was originally appointed to the role by former Governor John Kitzhaber on June 29, 2012, to finish the term of her predecessor John Kroger, who resigned from office. She was elected to a full term in 2012 and re-elected in 2016 and 2020. This office is not subject to term limits. In September 2023, Rosenblum announced that she would not seek re-election to a fourth term.

Primary elections took place May 21, 2024. Democratic nominee Dan Rayfield won the general election on November 5, 2024.

== Democratic primary ==
=== Candidates ===
==== Nominee ====
- Dan Rayfield, former speaker of the Oregon House of Representatives (2022–2024)

==== Eliminated in primary ====
- Shaina Pomerantz, former civil rights investigator at the Oregon Bureau of Labor and Industries

==== Declined ====
- Marc Abrams, assistant attorney-in-charge in the Civil Litigation Section at the Oregon Department of Justice and former chair of the Oregon Democratic Party (1997–1999)
- Kate Lieber, majority leader of the Oregon Senate (2023–present)
- Ellen Rosenblum, incumbent attorney general (2012–present)

=== Endorsements ===
Dan Rayfield

Labor unions

- Oregon AFL–CIO
- Oregon Education Association

Newspapers

- Eugene Weekly
- The Oregonian
- Portland Mercury
- The Skanner
- Willamette Week

=== Results ===
Results by county Rayfield: 50–60%; 60–70%; 70–80%; 80–90%

Democratic primary results
Party	Candidate	Votes	%
Democratic	Dan Rayfield	318,313	75.71%
Democratic	Shaina Pomerantz	102,146	24.29%
Total votes		420,459	100.00%

== Republican primary ==
=== Candidates ===
==== Nominee ====
- Will Lathrop, executive country director at International Justice Mission

==== Eliminated in primary ====
- Michael Cross, businessman, candidate for attorney general in 2020, and candidate for governor in 2022

=== Endorsements ===
Will Lathrop

Newspapers

- The Oregonian
- Willamette Week

=== Results ===
Results by county Lathrop: 50–60%; 60–70%; 70–80%; 80–90%

Republican primary results
Party	Candidate	Votes	%
Republican	Will Lathrop	190,995	64.57%
Republican	Michael Cross	104,813	35.43%
Total votes		295,808	100.00%

== General election ==
=== Predictions ===
Source	Ranking	As of
Sabato's Crystal Ball	Likely D	November 1, 2024

=== Post-primary endorsements ===
Dan Rayfield (D)

Organizations

- Democratic Attorneys General Association

Political parties

- Forward Party

Newspapers

- The Oregonian
- Willamette Week

=== Debates ===
2024 Oregon Attorney General election debate
No.	Date	Host	Moderators	Link	Democratic	Republican
Key: P Participant A Absent N Not invited I Invited W Withdrawn						
Key: P Participant A Absent N Not invited I Invited W Withdrawn					Rayfield	Lathrop
1	October 16, 2024	KOIN 6	Ken Boddie		P	P

=== Polling ===
Poll source	Date(s) administered	Sample size (Note: Key: A – all adults RV – registered voters LV – likely voters V – unclear)	Margin of error	Dan Rayfield Democratic	Will Lathrop Republican	Undecided
Public Policy Polling (D) (Note: This poll was sponsored by the Northwest Progressive Institute)	October 16–17, 2024	716 (LV)	± 3.7%	46%	41%	13%

=== Results ===
2024 Oregon Attorney General election
Party	Candidate	Votes	%	±%
Democratic	Dan Rayfield	1,156,489	54.37%	–1.60%
Republican	Will Lathrop	967,964	45.51%	+4.16%
Write-in		2,612	0.12%	–0.26%
Total votes		2,127,065	100.00%	N/A
Democratic hold				

==== By county ====
County	Dan Rayfield Democratic		Will Lathrop Republican		Write-in Various		Margin		Total
County	#	%	#	%	#	%	#	%	Total
Baker	2,190	23.53%	7,107	76.35%	11	0.12%	-4,917	-52.83%	9,308
Benton	32,110	66.45%	16,135	33.39%	75	0.16%	15,975	33.06%	48,320
Clackamas	117,934	51.12%	112,444	48.74%	324	0.14%	5,490	2.38%	230,702
Clatsop	11,846	53.78%	10,156	46.10%	26	0.12%	1,690	7.67%	22,028
Columbia	12,316	41.49%	17,328	58.37%	42	0.14%	-5,012	-16.88%	29,686
Coos	13,197	38.79%	20,793	61.11%	34	0.10%	-7,596	-22.33%	34,024
Crook	3,607	23.06%	12,007	76.77%	27	0.17%	-8,400	-53.71%	15,641
Curry	5,430	40.26%	8,047	59.67%	9	0.07%	-2,617	-19.41%	13,486
Deschutes	62,109	51.36%	58,748	48.58%	73	0.06%	3,361	2.78%	120,930
Douglas	17,664	29.78%	41,561	70.08%	83	0.14%	-23,897	-40.29%	59,308
Gilliam	274	24.86%	828	75.14%	0	0.00%	-554	-50.27%	1,102
Grant	792	18.69%	3,441	81.19%	5	0.12%	-2,649	-62.51%	4,238
Harney	763	19.12%	3,220	80.68%	8	0.20%	-2,457	-61.56%	3,991
Hood River	7,721	64.28%	4,274	35.58%	16	0.13%	3,447	28.70%	12,011
Jackson	50,904	44.74%	62,813	55.20%	67	0.06%	-11,909	-10.47%	113,784
Jefferson	3,727	33.14%	7,507	66.75%	12	0.11%	-3,780	-33.61%	11,246
Josephine	15,814	33.73%	31,013	66.15%	54	0.12%	-15,199	-32.42%	46,881
Klamath	9,268	27.42%	24,509	72.51%	23	0.07%	-15,241	-45.09%	33,800
Lake	672	16.55%	3,382	83.30%	6	0.15%	-2,710	-66.75%	4,060
Lane	118,333	59.25%	81,043	40.58%	340	0.17%	37,290	18.67%	199,716
Lincoln	16,370	57.46%	12,085	42.42%	36	0.13%	4,285	15.04%	28,491
Linn	24,418	36.36%	42,661	63.53%	73	0.11%	-18,243	-27.17%	67,152
Malheur	2,730	25.90%	7,802	74.03%	7	0.07%	-5,072	-48.13%	10,539
Marion	69,435	46.49%	79,750	53.40%	162	0.11%	-10,315	-6.91%	149,347
Morrow	1,086	24.25%	3,388	75.66%	4	0.09%	-2,302	-51.41%	4,478
Multnomah	309,113	78.72%	82,932	21.12%	640	0.16%	226,181	57.60%	392,685
Polk	20,469	44.99%	24,980	54.91%	44	0.10%	-4,511	-9.92%	45,493
Sherman	202	18.21%	905	81.61%	2	0.18%	-703	-63.39%	1,109
Tillamook	7,305	47.70%	7,998	52.22%	12	0.08%	-693	-4.52%	15,315
Umatilla	8,613	29.24%	20,814	70.66%	28	0.10%	-12,201	-41.42%	29,455
Union	3,748	26.98%	10,133	72.95%	9	0.06%	-6,385	-45.97%	13,890
Wallowa	1,258	24.98%	3,776	74.97%	3	0.06%	-2,518	-49.99%	5,037
Wasco	5,617	44.36%	7,030	55.52%	15	0.12%	-1,413	-11.16%	12,662
Washington	175,184	62.29%	105,751	37.60%	306	0.11%	69,433	24.69%	281,241
Wheeler	185	22.45%	639	77.55%	0	0.00%	-454	-55.10%	824
Yamhill	24,085	43.72%	30,964	56.21%	36	0.07%	-6,879	-12.49%	55,085
Totals	1,156,489	54.37%	967,964	45.51%	2,612	0.12%	188,525	8.86%	2,127,065

==== Counties that flipped form Democratic to Republican ====
- Marion (largest city: Salem)
- Tillamook (largest city: Tillamook)

==== By congressional district ====
Rayfield won five of six congressional districts.

District	Rayfield	Lathrop	Representative
1st	65%	35%	Suzanne Bonamici
2nd	34%	66%	Cliff Bentz
3rd	71%	29%	Earl Blumenauer (118th Congress)
3rd	71%	29%	Maxine Dexter (119th Congress)
4th	54%	46%	Val Hoyle
5th	51%	49%	Lori Chavez-DeRemer (118th Congress)
5th	51%	49%	Janelle Bynum (119th Congress)
6th	52%	48%	Andrea Salinas

== See also ==
- 2024 Oregon elections
