= Elections in Oregon =

Elections in the U.S. state of Oregon are all held using a Vote by Mail (VBM) system. This means that all registered voters receive their ballots via postal delivery and can vote from their homes. A state Voters’ Pamphlet is mailed to every household in Oregon about three weeks before each statewide election. It includes information about each measure and candidate in the upcoming election.

In a 2020 study, Oregon was ranked as the easiest state for citizens to vote in.

== Voter registration ==
Resident citizens of Oregon can register to vote with or without a political party. Monthly and annual voter registration statistics are published by the Oregon Secretary of State.

=== Online ===
In March 2010, Oregon became the fourth state in the country (along with Arizona, Washington, and Kansas) to allow online voter registration.

=== Automatic ===
In March 2015, the Oregon legislature passed a bill to adopt an automatic voter registration procedure using information from the State DMV. The state has roughly 2.2 million registered voters out of an estimated 3 million eligible voters as of 2014 and the bill will potentially register half of the 800,000 unregistered, eligible voters. Eligible individuals found through the system will have 21 days to opt-out or register with a political party; otherwise they will be automatically registered to vote as "Non-affiliated" with any party.

== Campaign finance ==
The Oregon Constitution allows for a broader right to free speech than at the federal level including the topic of political campaign donations. The Oregon Supreme Court has consistently ruled that campaign contribution limits are a violation of free speech and has struck down many laws and ballot measures that enacted contribution limits. As a result of these rulings, Oregon is one of the only four states that have no campaign contribution limits of any kind.

The most recent attempt to enact campaign contribution limits was Ballot measures 46 and 47 in 2006. Measure 47 passed, but 46 did not, and in the absence of the kind of Constitutional support it would have provided, 47 did not take effect.

== Women's suffrage ==
In 1912, Oregon became the seventh U.S. state to permit women to vote. The amendment to the Oregon Constitution, passed by ballot initiative, was largely the result of decades of advocacy by Abigail Scott Duniway, who founded a weekly newspaper, The New Northwest, in part to promote voting rights for women. The National Women's Suffrage Association recognized Duniway as a leading women's advocate in the American West in 1886.

Women became eligible to run for the state legislature in 1914; within a year, women had won seats in both its houses.

== The Oregon System ==
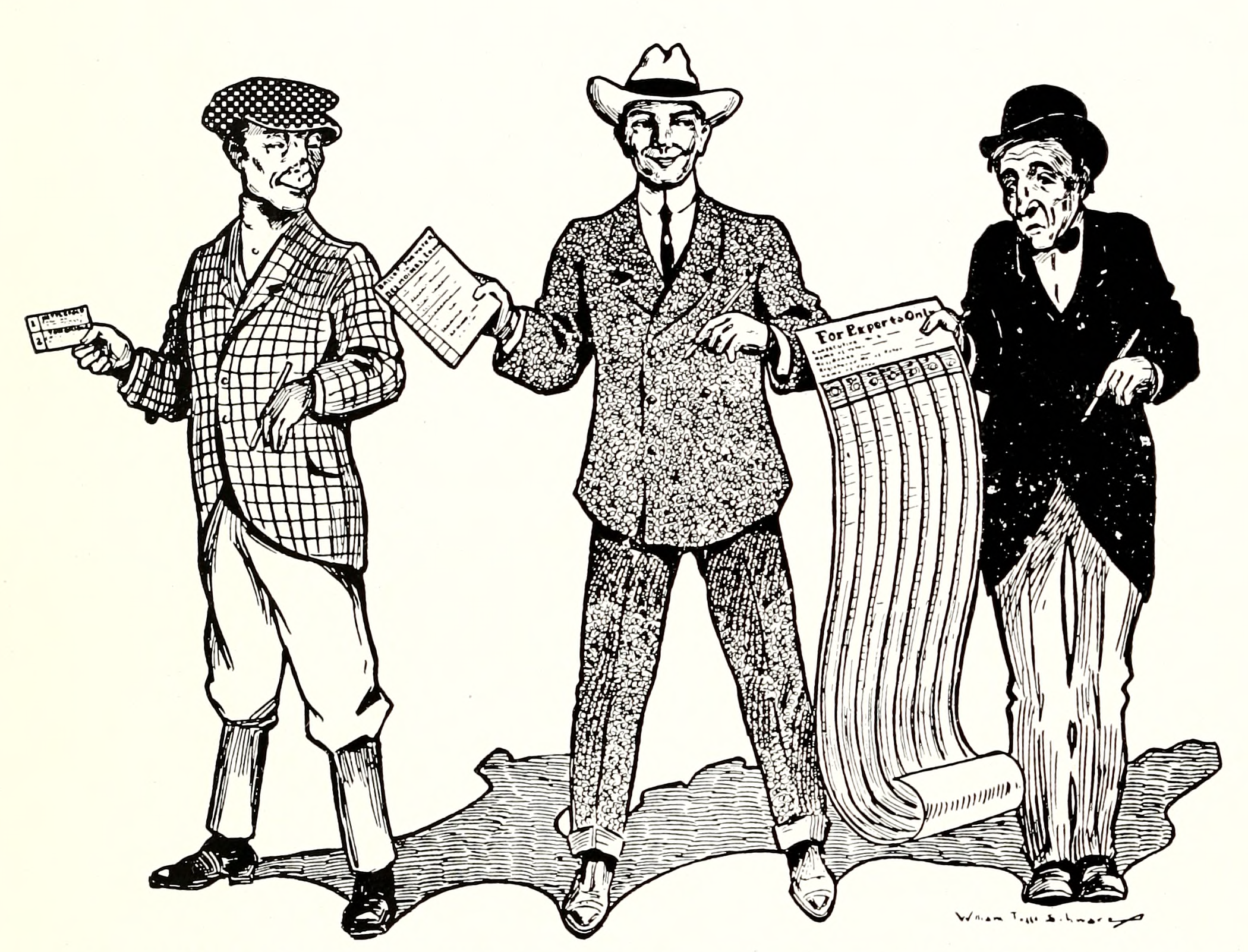
A 1912 editorial cartoon about the cumbersome nature of direct democracy: No. 1. The Glasgow (Scotland) voter has only one name—his ward councilman—to vote for, and he has the best city government in the world. No. 2. The Des Moines (Iowa) voter has only five men on his ticket, and has the best city government in the United States. No. 3. The Portland, Oregon, voter has in this year of our Lord 1912, about 100 candidates for office on his ticket; and 39 long initiative and referendum proposed state laws, and 22 proposed city laws—and altogether proposing an indebtedness on the taxpayers of forty to fifty millions of dollars. It is safe to say that all this proposed law making will not even be read by one-fourth of the voters—and no man can know what his rights or obligations may be under these circumstances.

In Oregon, the initiative and referendum process dates back to 1902, when the efforts of the Direct Legislation League prompted Oregon to amend its Constitution for the first time since 1859. The process of initiative and referendum became nationally known as the Oregon System.

There are three types of ballot measures that may appear on statewide ballots: initiatives, referendums, and referrals. Initiatives and referendums may be placed on the ballot if their supporters gather enough signatures from Oregon voters; the number of signatures is a percentage based on the number of voters casting ballots in the most recent election for the Governor of Oregon.

initiative
Any issue may be placed before the voters, either amending the Constitution or revising or adding to the Oregon Revised Statutes. Constitutional initiatives require the signature of 8% of recent voters to qualify for the ballot; statutory reforms require 6%.
referendum
The public may act to undo any bill passed by the Oregon Legislative Assembly, by putting a referendum on the ballot. A referendum requires 4% of recent voters to qualify for the ballot.
referral
The Legislative Assembly may refer any bill it passes to the public for approval, and must do so for any amendment to the Constitution. Additionally, the Legislative Assembly may refer revisions to the Constitution; a revision differs from an amendment in that it may alter multiple provisions of the Constitution.

The constitutional foundation for ballot measures (and legislation produced by the Oregon Legislative Assembly) may be found in Article IV of the Oregon Constitution, and Chapter 250 of the Oregon Revised Statutes relates to initiative and referendum as well.

Oregon voters have acted on 851 statewide ballot measures (359 initiatives, 64 referendums, and 428 legislative referrals) since the system was introduced in 1902.

== Vote by Mail ==
=== History ===
The VBM system was first approved for testing by the Oregon Legislature for local elections in 1981. The system met with fairly widespread success and was made permanent for the majority of counties for local/special elections in 1987. It was used for the first statewide special election in 1993. The Oregon Legislature approved a proposal to expand VBM to primary and general elections in the spring of 1995, but Governor John Kitzhaber vetoed the bill. However, by January 1996, Oregon became the first state to conduct a general election totally by mail to fill a vacancy in a federal office when it elected Senator Ron Wyden to replace Bob Packwood with a 66 percent turnout.

In June 1998 supporters of expanding VBM to primary and general elections used the initiative to put the issue on the November general election ballot as Measure 60. No paid signature gatherers were used to put the measure on the ballot – a first since 1994, and on November 3, 1998, Oregon voters decide to expand VBM to primary and general elections by a vote of 757,204 to 334,021.

In the 2000 election cycle, Oregon for the first time used VBM in a Presidential Primary election and then a Presidential General election, with a 79 percent turnout.

=== Voters' Pamphlet ===
A state Voters' Pamphlet is mailed to every household in Oregon about 3 weeks before each statewide election. It includes information about each measure and candidate in the upcoming election. If a voter does not receive a Voters' Pamphlet, they can order or pick one up from any County Elections Office, or the Secretary of State's Office. Some counties may print a voters’ pamphlet with local measures and candidates as well and these may be included with the state pamphlet or mailed separately.

For each statewide election, the Voters' Pamphlet is also available in an accessible online format at the Oregon Secretary of State's Election Division Website. An audio Voters' Guide is also available for each statewide election.

Copies of historical voters' pamphlets from Marion County (containing most statewide races and ballot measures) are online at the Oregon State Library.

=== Balloting ===
Ballots packs are mailed to every registered voter 14 to 18 days before the election. When the ballot pack comes in the mail, it includes:

- An official ballot
- A secrecy envelope
- A ballot return envelope

After filling out the ballot the voter then places the ballot in the secrecy envelope, then inside the return envelope and must then sign it in a space provided on the outside return envelope. This is then either mailed back through the US mail with first class postage, or dropped off at any County Elections Office or a designated dropsite. Ballots must be received in a County Elections Office or postmarked by 8pm on Election Day.

Once received, an Elections Official at the elections office where the ballot is received will compare the signature on the ballot return envelope to the signature on the voter registration card to verify that the voter is registered to vote. Once verified, the secrecy envelope containing the actual ballot is removed and polled with the other ballots. Once the "polls" close at 8pm on Election Day, the ballots are removed from their secrecy envelopes and counted.

== Recent elections ==
=== 1996 elections ===
- 1996 United States presidential election in Oregon
- 1996 United States Senate election in Oregon
- 1996 United States Senate special election in Oregon
- 1996 United States House of Representatives elections in Oregon

=== 1998 elections ===
- 1998 United States Senate election in Oregon
- 1998 United States House of Representatives elections in Oregon
- 1998 Oregon gubernatorial election

=== 2000 elections ===
- 2000 United States presidential election in Oregon
- 2000 United States House of Representatives elections in Oregon

=== 2002 elections ===
- 2002 United States Senate election in Oregon
- 2002 United States House of Representatives elections in Oregon
- 2002 Oregon gubernatorial election

=== 2004 elections ===
- 2004 United States presidential election in Oregon
- 2004 United States Senate election in Oregon
- 2004 United States House of Representatives elections in Oregon

=== 2006 elections ===
- 2006 Oregon elections
- 2006 United States House of Representatives elections in Oregon
- 2006 Oregon gubernatorial election

=== 2008 elections ===
==== Presidential race ====
The 2008 presidential, senatorial and congressional elections in Oregon were held on November 4, 2008, to determine the President, Oregon's junior United States senator, and who would represent the state of Oregon in the United States House of Representatives.

Democratic Presidential candidate Barack Obama won 56.7% of Oregon's vote in 2008, soundly defeating Republican candidate John McCain. Most rural counties favored McCain, though Obama improved the Democratic tickets performance than John Kerry did in 2004, and Obama's strong support in the more urban Willamette Valley allowed him to win the state decisively.

==== U.S. Senate race ====
The Oregon Senate Election of 2008 was held on November 4, 2008. Republican Senator Gordon Smith was seeking re-election. Smith was the only Republican Senator from the west coast (excluding Alaska) and the only Republican currently holding statewide office in Oregon. He was opposed by Democrat Jeff Merkley, the Speaker of the Oregon House of Representatives and David Brownlow of the Constitution Party of Oregon. Merkley won by a narrow margin, with Smith conceding two days after the election.

==== U.S. House races ====
The 2008 congressional elections in Oregon were held on November 4, 2008, to determine who will represent the state of Oregon in the United States House of Representatives, coinciding with the presidential and senatorial elections. Oregon's five seats in the House, apportioned according to the 2000 United States census. Both prior to and following the election consists of four Democrats and one Republican. This remains unchanged although CQ Politics had forecasted district 5 to be at some risk for the incumbent party.

The only competitive race was the Oregon's 5th congressional district which had been represented by Democrat Darlene Hooley since 1996. In February 2008, she announced that she would not seek re-election in 2008. The race to replace her was expected to be one of the most competitive in the nation, since the district contained about 2,000 more Republicans than Democrats at that time.

Despite the initial closeness of the race, Democratic nominee Kurt Schrader won against Republican nominee Mike Erickson, 166,070 (54.5%) to 116,418 (38.2%) who had been winner of a contentious primary in which an opponent, Kevin Mannix, raised an allegation that Erickson paid for a former girlfriend's abortion. The girlfriend subsequently went public with the information, but Erickson denied knowledge of the event. Mannix refused to endorse Erickson in the general election.

- 2008 Oregon elections

=== 2010 elections ===
- 2010 Oregon elections
- 2010 Oregon legislative election
- 2010 United States House of Representatives elections in Oregon
- 2010 United States Senate election in Oregon
- 2010 Oregon gubernatorial election

=== 2012 elections ===
- 2012 United States presidential election in Oregon
- 2012 Oregon's 1st congressional district special election
- 2012 United States House of Representatives elections in Oregon
- 2012 Oregon elections
- 2012 Oregon legislative election
- 2012 Portland, Oregon mayoral election

=== 2014 elections ===
- 2014 United States Senate election in Oregon
- 2014 United States House of Representatives elections in Oregon
- 2014 Oregon gubernatorial election
- 2014 Oregon elections
- 2014 Oregon legislative election

=== 2016 elections ===
- 2016 United States presidential election in Oregon
- 2016 United States Senate election in Oregon
- 2016 United States House of Representatives elections in Oregon
- 2016 Oregon gubernatorial special election
- 2016 Oregon Secretary of State election
- 2016 Oregon elections
- 2016 Oregon legislative election
- 2016 Portland, Oregon mayoral election
- 2016 Portland, Oregon City Commission election

=== 2018 elections ===
- 2018 United States House of Representatives elections in Oregon
- 2018 Oregon gubernatorial election
- 2018 Oregon elections
- 2018 Oregon legislative election
- 2018 Portland, Oregon City Commission election

=== 2020 elections ===
- 2020 United States presidential election in Oregon
- 2020 United States Senate election in Oregon
- 2020 United States House of Representatives elections in Oregon
- 2020 Oregon Secretary of State election
- 2020 Oregon Attorney General election
- 2020 Oregon State Treasurer election
- 2020 Oregon House of Representatives election
- 2020 Oregon State Senate election
- 2020 Portland, Oregon mayoral election
- 2020 Portland, Oregon City Commission election

=== 2022 elections ===
- 2022 United States Senate election in Oregon
- 2022 United States House of Representatives elections in Oregon
- 2022 Oregon House of Representatives election
- 2022 Oregon State Senate election
- 2022 Portland, Oregon City Commission election

=== 2024 elections ===
- 2024 Oregon elections
- 2024 United States presidential election in Oregon
- 2024 United States House of Representatives elections in Oregon
- 2024 Oregon Secretary of State election
- 2024 Oregon Attorney General election
- 2024 Oregon State Treasurer election
- 2024 Oregon House of Representatives election
- 2024 Oregon Senate election
- 2024 Portland, Oregon, mayoral election
- 2024 Portland, Oregon City Council election

== See also ==
- 2026 Oregon elections
- Politics of Oregon
- Political party strength in Oregon
- Elections in the United States
- United States presidential elections in Oregon
- Politics of the United States
- Oregon elections
- "Article II of the Oregon Constitution". with notes on all changes related to voting and elections
