= Oregon's 1st congressional district =

U.S. House district for Oregon

Coordinates: 45°30′N 123°12′W

- Interactive map of district boundaries since January 3, 2023
- Representative: Suzanne Bonamici; D–Beaverton
- Area: 2,941 mi^{2} (7,620 km^{2})
- Distribution: 86.65% urban; 13.35% rural
- Population (2025): 734,045
- Median household income: $98,867
- Ethnicity: 65.5% White; 15.0% Hispanic; 9.6% Asian; 6.3% Two or more races; 2.0% Black; 1.5% other
- Occupation: 65.3% White-collar; 21.8% Blue-collar; 12.9% Gray-collar
- Cook PVI: D+20

Oregon's 1st congressional district is a congressional district located in the U.S state of Oregon. The district stretches from Portland's western suburbs and exurbs, to parts of the Oregon coast. The district includes the principal cities of Beaverton, Hillsboro, and Tigard, all located in the Portland metropolitan area. Geographically, the district is located in the northwest corner of Oregon. It includes all of Clatsop, Columbia and Tillamook Counties, most of Washington County excluding the extreme southeast, and a portion of southwest Multnomah County in Portland. It generally includes most of Portland west of the Williamette River.

The district has been represented by Democrat Suzanne Bonamici since 2012. Bonamici won a special election to replace David Wu, who resigned in the wake of accusations of sexual misconduct.

The district was a Democratic-leaning swing district for much of the 1990s, with a number of competitive contests after 18-year incumbent Democrat Les AuCoin gave up the seat to run for United States Senate in 1992. However, since the district was pushed further into Portland after the 2000 census, it has been much safer for the Democrats; the Republicans have only managed 40 percent of the vote once since 2003. With a Cook Partisan Voting Index of D+20, it is the second-most Democratic district in the state, behind only the neighboring 3rd district covering most of the rest of Portland. It is the fourth most Democratic district in the Pacific Northwest, only Washington's 7th and 9th districts and Oregon's 3rd are more Democratic.

== Recent election results from statewide races ==
Year	Office	Results
2008	President	Obama 66% - 32%
2012	President	Obama 65% - 35%
2016	President	Clinton 61% - 28%
2016	Senate	Wyden 64% - 26%
2016	Governor (Spec.)	Brown 60% - 35%
2016	Attorney General	Rosenblum 64% - 33%
2018	Governor	Brown 60% - 35%
2020	President	Biden 68% - 29%
2020	Senate	Merkley 67% - 29%
2020	Secretary of State	Fagan 60% - 32%
2020	Treasurer	Read 62% - 32%
2020	Attorney General	Rosenblum 67% - 31%
2022	Senate	Wyden 66% - 30%
2022	Governor	Kotek 57% - 31%
2024	President	Harris 67% - 29%
2024	Secretary of State	Read 64% - 31%
2024	Treasurer	Steiner 59% - 32%
2024	Attorney General	Rayfield 65% - 35%

== Composition ==
For the 118th and successive Congresses (based on redistricting following the 2020 census), the district contains all or portions of the following counties and communities:

Clatsop County (11)

All 11 communities

Columbia County (9)

All 9 communities

Multnomah County (1)

Portland (part; also 3rd and 5th; shared with Clackamas and Washington counties)

Tillamook County (21)

All 21 communities

Washington County (22)

Aloha, Banks, Beaverton (part; also 6th), Bethany, Bull Mountain (part; also 6th), Cedar Hills, Cedar Mill, Cherry Grove, Cornelius, Dilley, Forest Grove, Gaston, Hillsboro, Marlene Village, North Plains, Oak Hills, Portland (part; also 3rd and 5th, shared with Clackamas and Multnomah counties), Raleigh Hills (part; also 6th), Rockcreek, Tigard (part; also 6th), West Haven-Sylvan, West Slope

== List of members representing the district ==
Member (Residence)	Party	Years	Congress	Electoral history
District established March 4, 1893
Binger Hermann (Roseburg)	Republican	March 4, 1893 – March 3, 1897	53rd 54th	Redistricted from the at-large district and re-elected in 1892. Re-elected in 1894. Resigned to become Commissioner of the United States General Land Office.
Thomas H. Tongue (Hillsboro)	Republican	March 4, 1897 – January 11, 1903	55th 56th 57th	Elected in 1896. Re-elected in 1898. Re-elected in 1900. Re-elected in 1902 but died before next term began.
Vacant		January 11, 1903 – June 1, 1903	57th 58th	
Binger Hermann (Roseburg)	Republican	June 1, 1903 – March 3, 1907	58th 59th	Elected to finish Tongue's term. Re-elected in 1904. Retired due to the Oregon land fraud scandal.
Willis C. Hawley (Salem)	Republican	March 4, 1907 – March 3, 1933	60th 61st 62nd 63rd 64th 65th 66th 67th 68th 69th 70th 71st 72nd	Elected in 1906. Re-elected in 1908. Re-elected in 1910. Re-elected in 1912. Re-elected in 1914. Re-elected in 1916. Re-elected in 1918. Re-elected in 1920. Re-elected in 1922. Re-elected in 1924. Re-elected in 1926. Re-elected in 1928. Re-elected in 1930. Lost renomination.
James W. Mott (Salem)	Republican	March 4, 1933 – November 12, 1945	73rd 74th 75th 76th 77th 78th 79th	Elected in 1932. Re-elected in 1934. Re-elected in 1936. Re-elected in 1938. Re-elected in 1940. Re-elected in 1942. Re-elected in 1944. Died.
Vacant		November 12, 1945 – January 18, 1946	79th	
A. Walter Norblad (Stayton)	Republican	January 18, 1946 – September 20, 1964	79th 80th 81st 82nd 83rd 84th 85th 86th 87th 88th	Elected to finish Mott's term. Re-elected in 1946. Re-elected in 1948. Re-elected in 1950. Re-elected in 1952. Re-elected in 1954. Re-elected in 1956. Re-elected in 1958. Re-elected in 1960. Re-elected in 1962. Died.
Vacant		September 20, 1964 – November 3, 1964	88th	
Wendell Wyatt (Gearhart)	Republican	November 3, 1964 – January 3, 1975	88th 89th 90th 91st 92nd 93rd	Elected to finish Norblad's term. Also elected to the next full term. Re-elected in 1966. Re-elected in 1968. Re-elected in 1970. Re-elected in 1972. Retired.
Les AuCoin (Portland)	Democratic	January 3, 1975 – January 3, 1993	94th 95th 96th 97th 98th 99th 100th 101st 102nd	Elected in 1974. Re-elected in 1976. Re-elected in 1978. Re-elected in 1980. Re-elected in 1982. Re-elected in 1984. Re-elected in 1986. Re-elected in 1988. Re-elected in 1990. Retired to run for U.S. Senator.
Elizabeth Furse (Hillsboro)	Democratic	January 3, 1993 – January 3, 1999	103rd 104th 105th	Elected in 1992. Re-elected in 1994. Re-elected in 1996. Retired.
David Wu (Portland)	Democratic	January 3, 1999 – August 3, 2011	106th 107th 108th 109th 110th 111th 112th	Elected in 1998. Re-elected in 2000. Re-elected in 2002. Re-elected in 2004. Re-elected in 2006. Re-elected in 2008. Re-elected in 2010. Resigned due to sexual misconduct accusations.
Vacant		August 3, 2011 – January 31, 2012	112th	
Suzanne Bonamici (Beaverton)	Democratic	January 31, 2012 – present	112th 113th 114th 115th 116th 117th 118th 119th	Elected to finish Wu's term. Re-elected in 2012. Re-elected in 2014. Re-elected in 2016. Re-elected in 2018. Re-elected in 2020. Re-elected in 2022. Re-elected in 2024. Re-elected in 2026.

== Recent election results ==
Sources (official results only):

- Elections History from the Oregon Secretary of State website
- Election Statistics from the website of the Clerk of the United States House of Representatives

=== 1996 ===
United States House of Representatives elections in Oregon, 1996: District 1
Party	Candidate	Votes	%
Democratic	Elizabeth Furse (incumbent)	144,588	51.90
Republican	Bill Witt	126,146	45.28
Libertarian	Richard Johnson	6,310	2.26
Socialist	David Princ	1,146	0.41
Misc.	Misc.	414	0.15
Democratic hold			

=== 1998 ===
United States House of Representatives elections in Oregon, 1998: District 1
Party	Candidate	Votes	%
Democratic	David Wu	119,993	50.10
Republican	Molly Bordonaro	112,827	47.11
Libertarian	Michael De Paulo	4,218	1.76
Socialist	John F. Hryciuk	2,224	0.93
Misc.	Misc.	234	0.10
Democratic hold			

=== 2000 ===
United States House of Representatives elections in Oregon, 2000: District 1
Party	Candidate	Votes	%
Democratic	David Wu (incumbent)	176,902	58.28
Republican	Charles Starr	115,303	37.99
Libertarian	Beth A. King	10,858	3.58
Misc.	Misc.	458	0.15
Democratic hold			

=== 2002 ===
United States House of Representatives elections in Oregon, 2002: District 1
Party	Candidate	Votes	%
Democratic	David Wu (incumbent)	149,215	62.69
Republican	Jim Greenfield	80,917	33.99
Libertarian	Beth A. King	7,639	3.21
Misc.	Misc.	265	0.11
Democratic hold			

=== 2004 ===
United States House of Representatives elections in Oregon, 2004: District 1
Party	Candidate	Votes	%
Democratic	David Wu (incumbent)	203,771	57.51
Republican	Goli Ameri	135,164	38.15
Constitution	Dean Wolf	13,882	3.91
Misc.	Misc.	1,521	0.43
Democratic hold			

=== 2006 ===
United States House of Representatives elections in Oregon, 2006: District 1
Party	Candidate	Votes	%
Democratic	David Wu (incumbent)	169,409	62.83
Republican	Derrick Kitts	90,904	33.71
Libertarian	Drake Davis	4,497	1.67
Democratic hold			

=== 2008 ===
United States House of Representatives elections in Oregon, 2008: District 1
Party	Candidate	Votes	%
Democratic	David Wu (incumbent)	237,567	72.6
Independent Party	Joel Haugen	58,279	17.7
Constitution	Scott Semrau	14,172	4.27
Libertarian	H. Joe Tabor	10,992	3.31
Pacific Green	Chris Henry	7,128	2.14
Misc.	Misc.	4,110	1.23
Democratic hold			

=== 2010 ===
United States House of Representatives elections in Oregon, 2010: District 1
Party	Candidate	Votes	%
Democratic	David Wu (incumbent)	160,357	54.7
Republican	Rob Cornilles	122,858	41.9
Constitution	Don LaMunyon	3,855	1.32
Pacific Green	Chris Henry	2,955	1.01
Libertarian	H. Joe Tabor	2,492	0.85
Misc.	Misc.	392	0.13
Democratic hold			

=== 2012 special election ===
A special election was held on January 31, 2012, to replace the most recent incumbent David Wu, who created a vacancy in the office with his resignation effective August 3, 2011. The winner of the election, Suzanne Bonamici, served the remainder of Wu's two-year term.

Oregon's 1st congressional district special election, 2012
Party	Candidate	Votes	%
Democratic	Suzanne Bonamici	111,570	53.82
Republican	Rob Cornilles	81,985	39.55
Progressive	Steven Reynolds	6,679	3.22
Libertarian	James Foster	6,524	3.15
Misc.	Misc.	527	0.25
Total votes		207,285	100.0
Democratic hold			

=== 2012 ===
United States House of Representatives elections in Oregon, 2012: District 1
Party	Candidate	Votes	%
Democratic	Suzanne Bonamici (incumbent)	197,845	59.60
Republican	Delinda Morgan	109,699	33.04
Progressive	Steven Reynolds	15,009	4.52
Constitution	Bob Ekstrom	8,919	2.69
Misc.	Misc.	509	0.15
Total votes		331,980	100
Democratic hold			

=== 2014 ===
United States House of Representatives elections in Oregon, 2014: District 1
Party	Candidate	Votes	%
Democratic	Suzanne Bonamici (incumbent)	160,038	57.31
Republican	Jason Yates	96,245	34.47
Libertarian	James Foster	11,213	4.02
Pacific Green	Steven C. Reynolds	11,163	4.00
Misc.	Misc.	594	0.20
Total votes		279,253	100
Democratic hold			

=== 2016 ===
United States House of Representatives elections in Oregon, 2016: District 1
Party	Candidate	Votes	%
Democratic	Suzanne Bonamici (incumbent)	225,391	59.6
Republican	Brian Heinrich	139,756	37
Libertarian	Kyle Sheahan	12,357	3.2
Misc.	Misc.	691	0.2
Turnout			57.7
Total votes		378,195	100
Democratic hold			

=== 2018 ===
United States House of Representatives elections in Oregon, 2018: District 1
Party	Candidate	Votes	%
Democratic	Suzanne Bonamici (incumbent)	231,198	63.6
Republican	John Verbeek	116,446	32.1
Libertarian	Drew Layda	15,121	4.2
Misc.	Misc.	484	0.1
Turnout			55.5
Total votes		363,249	100
Democratic hold			

=== 2020 ===
United States House of Representatives elections in Oregon, 2020: District 1
Party	Candidate	Votes	%
Democratic	Suzanne Bonamici (incumbent)	297,071	64.6
Republican	Christopher Christensen	161,928	35.2
Misc.	Misc.	900	0.2
Turnout			
Total votes		459,899	100
Democratic hold			

=== 2022 ===
United States House of Representatives elections in Oregon, 2022: District 1
Party	Candidate	Votes	%
Democratic	Suzanne Bonamici (incumbent)	210,682	67.9
Republican	Christopher Mann	99,042	31.9
Write-in		519	0.2
Total votes		310,243	100
Democratic hold			

=== 2024 ===
2024 United States House election: Oregon District 1
Party	Candidate	Votes	%
Democratic	Suzanne Bonamici (incumbent)	241,556	68.6
Republican	Bob Todd	98,908	28.1
Libertarian	Joe Christman	10,840	3.1
Write-in		687	0.2
Total votes		351,991	100%

== Historical district boundaries ==
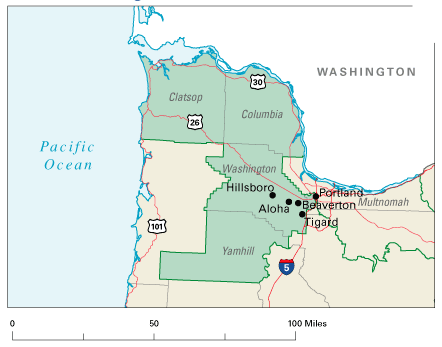
2003 - 2013

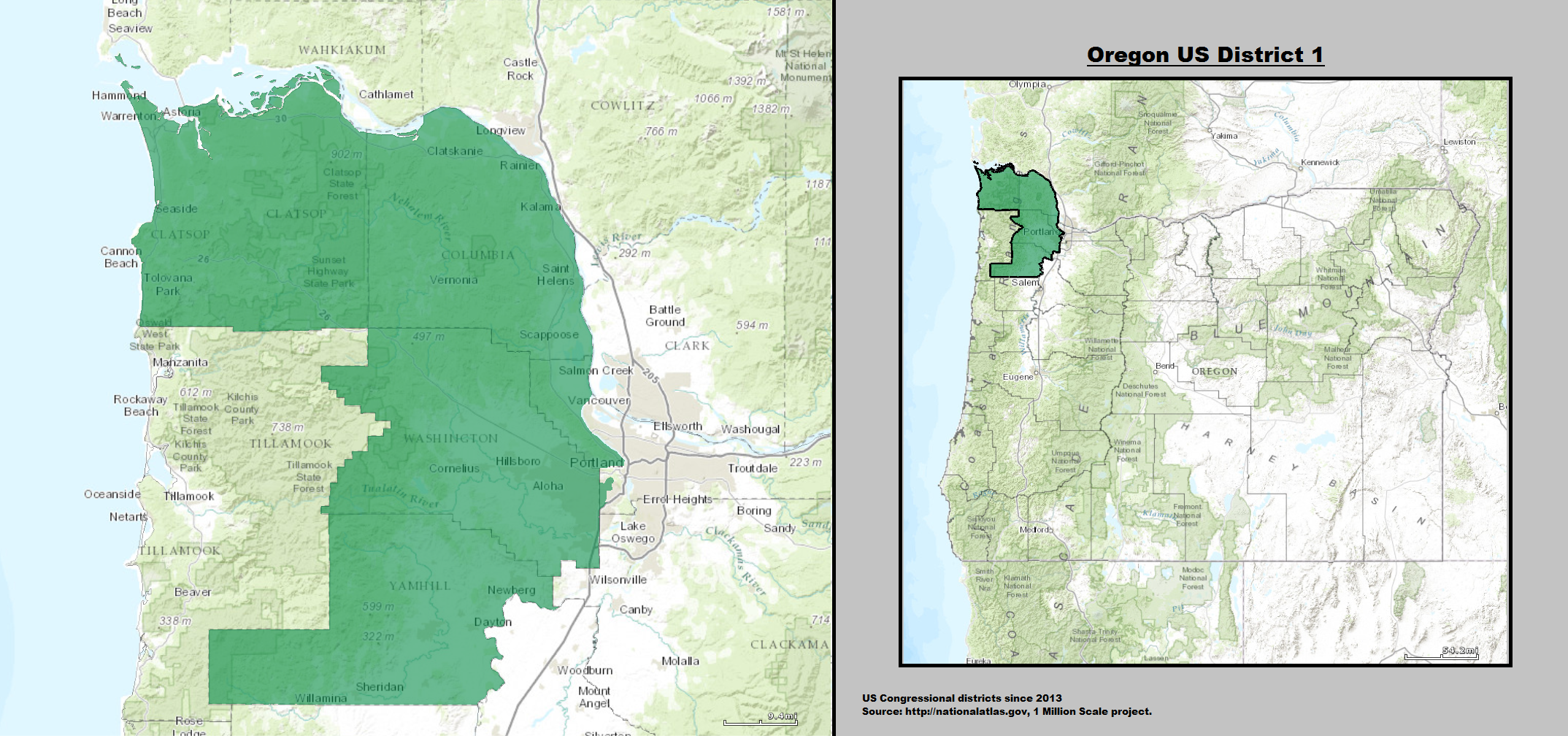
2013 - 2023

Following the 2000 United States census, the district gained some of Multnomah County, which had previously been part of the 3rd district. After the 2010 United States census, the district boundaries were changed to move Downtown Portland from the 1st to the 3rd district.

== See also ==
- Oregon's congressional districts
- List of United States congressional districts
