= Oregon's 5th congressional district =

U.S. House district for Oregon

Coordinates: 45°N 123°W

- Interactive map of district boundaries since January 3, 2023
- Representative: Janelle Bynum; D–Happy Valley
- Area: 5,362 mi^{2} (13,890 km^{2})
- Distribution: 80.34% urban; 19.66% rural
- Population (2025): 708,243
- Median household income: $96,818
- Ethnicity: 78.8% White; 10.1% Hispanic; 5.9% Two or more races; 3.0% Asian; 1.4% other; 0.9% Black
- Occupation: 60.6% White-collar; 24.5% Blue-collar; 14.9% Gray-collar
- Cook PVI: D+4

Oregon's 5th congressional district stretches from the Southeast corner of Portland through the eastern half of the Willamette Valley and then reaches across the Cascades to take in Sisters and Bend. It is one of six Oregon congressional districts. It includes a sliver of Multnomah County, the majority of Clackamas County, the rural eastern portion of Marion County, most of Linn County, a very small section of southwest Jefferson County, and the populated northwest portion of Deschutes County. It was significantly redrawn when Oregon gained a 6th congressional district after the 2020 census.

The district is currently represented by Democrat Janelle Bynum.

Following its creation after the 1980 census, the first five members to represent the district all got divorced while in office, a pattern that has brought the district to media attention.

== History ==
The district was created in 1982 when Oregon was granted a new congressional district as a result of reapportionment from the 1980 census. Denny Smith, who had represented Oregon's 2nd congressional district in the previous Congress, was re-elected in the 5th district in 1982 after it absorbed most of the western portion of the old 2nd.

In 2002, the district shrank slightly in area due to redistricting. About half of the portion of the district that had been in Benton County was moved into the 4th district and portions of west-central Clackamas County were moved into the 3rd district. At the same time, small portions of northern Clackamas and southern Multnomah County that had previously been part of the 1st district were moved into the 5th district.

Following the 2020 census and the subsequent redistricting, the 5th was redrawn significantly. It lost its western and coastal portions, including the urban portion of Salem, as well as all of Polk, Lincoln, and Tillamook counties. It gained all of Linn County and the most populated portions of Deschutes County. It is the most evenly divided district in partisan terms in Oregon, and has been through many iterations.

== Composition ==
For the 118th and successive Congresses (based on redistricting following the 2020 census), the district contains all or portions of the following counties and communities:

Clackamas County (16)

Barlow, Beavercreek, Canby, Gladstone, Happy Valley (part; also 3rd), Jennings Lodge, Johnson City, Lake Oswego (part; also 6th; shared with Multnomah and Washington counties), Milwaukie, Molalla, Mulino, Oak Grove, Oatfield, Oregon City, Stafford, West Linn

Deschutes County (14)

Bend (part; also 2nd), Black Butte Ranch, Crooked River Ranch (part; also 2nd; shared with Jefferson County), Deschutes River Woods, Eagle Crest, Pronghorn, Redmond, Seventh Mountain, Sisters, Sunriver, Terrebonne, Tetherow, Three Rivers (part; also 2nd), Tumalo

Jefferson County (0)

No incorporated or census-recognized communities

Linn County (24)

All 24 communities

Marion County (15)

Brooks (part; also 6th), Detroit, Four Corners (part; also 6th), Gates, Hayesville (part; also 6th), Idanha (shared with Linn County), Labish Village, Mehama, Mill City (shared with Linn County), Mt. Angel, Salem (part; also 6th; shared with Polk County), Scotts Mills, Silverton, Stayton, Sublimity

Multnomah County (3)

Dunthorpe, Portland (part; also 1st and 3rd shared with Clackamas and Washington counties)

== List of members representing the district ==
Representative	Party	Term	Cong ress	Electoral history
District established January 3, 1983
Denny Smith (Salem)	Republican	January 3, 1983 – January 3, 1991	98th 99th 100th 101st	Redistricted from the 2nd district and re-elected in 1982. Re-elected in 1984. Re-elected in 1986. Re-elected in 1988. Lost re-election.
Mike Kopetski (Salem)	Democratic	January 3, 1991 – January 3, 1995	102nd 103rd	Elected in 1990. Re-elected in 1992. Retired.
Jim Bunn (Gleneden Beach)	Republican	January 3, 1995 – January 3, 1997	104th	Elected in 1994. Lost re-election.
Darlene Hooley (West Linn)	Democratic	January 3, 1997 – January 3, 2009	105th 106th 107th 108th 109th 110th	Elected in 1996. Re-elected in 1998. Re-elected in 2000. Re-elected in 2002. Re-elected in 2004. Re-elected in 2006. Retired.
Kurt Schrader (Canby)	Democratic	January 3, 2009 – January 3, 2023	111th 112th 113th 114th 115th 116th 117th	Elected in 2008. Re-elected in 2010. Re-elected in 2012. Re-elected in 2014. Re-elected in 2016. Re-elected in 2018. Re-elected in 2020. Lost renomination.
Lori Chavez-DeRemer (Happy Valley)	Republican	January 3, 2023 – January 3, 2025	118th	Elected in 2022. Lost re-election.
Janelle Bynum (Happy Valley)	Democratic	January 3, 2025 – present	119th	Elected in 2024. Re-elected in 2026.

== Recent election results from statewide races ==
Year	Office	Results
2008	President	Obama 53% - 45%
2012	President	Obama 51% - 49%
2016	President	Clinton 46% - 43%
2016	Senate	Wyden 54% - 37%
2016	Governor (Spec.)	Pierce 49% - 46%
2016	Attorney General	Rosenblum 51% - 46%
2018	Governor	Buehler 49% - 45%
2020	President	Biden 53% - 44%
2020	Senate	Merkley 53% - 43%
2020	Secretary of State	Thatcher 47% - 46%
2020	Treasurer	Read 47% - 46%
2020	Attorney General	Rosenblum 52% - 45%
2022	Senate	Wyden 52% - 45%
2022	Governor	Drazan 48% - 43%
2024	President	Harris 52% - 44%
2024	Secretary of State	Read 52% - 45%
2024	Treasurer	Boquist 46.75% - 46.72%
2024	Attorney General	Rayfield 51% - 49%

== Election results ==
Sources (official results only):

- Elections History from the Oregon Secretary of State website
- Election Statistics from the website of the Clerk of the United States House of Representatives

=== 1996 ===
1996 United States House election: Oregon District 5
Party	Candidate	Votes	%
Democratic	Darlene Hooley	139,521	51.24
Republican	Jim Bunn (incumbent)	125,409	46.06
Libertarian	Lawrence Knight Duquesne	5,191	1.91
Socialist	Trey Smith	2,124	0.78
Misc.	Misc.	39	0.00

=== 1998 ===
1998 United States House election: Oregon District 5
Party	Candidate	Votes	%
Democratic	Darlene Hooley (incumbent)	124,916	54.71
Republican	Marylin Shannon	92,215	40.38
Pacific Green	Michael Donnelly	3,637	1.59
Libertarian	Blaine Thallheimer	2,979	1.30
Natural Law	Jim Burns	2,971	1.30
Socialist	Ed Dover	1,378	0.60
Misc.	Misc.	248	0.11

=== 2000 ===
2000 United States House election: Oregon District 5
Party	Candidate	Votes	%
Democratic	Darlene Hooley (incumbent)	156,315	56.77
Republican	Brian Boquist	118,631	43.08
Misc.	Misc.	402	0.15

=== 2002 ===
2002 United States House election: Oregon District 5
Party	Candidate	Votes	%
Democratic	Darlene Hooley (incumbent)	137,713	54.75
Republican	Brian Boquist	113,441	45.10
Misc.	Misc.	383	0.15

=== 2004 ===
2004 United States House election: Oregon District 5
Party	Candidate	Votes	%
Democratic	Darlene Hooley (incumbent)	184,833	52.86
Republican	Jim Zupancic	154,993	44.33
Libertarian	Jerry Defoe	6,463	1.84
Constitution	Joseph H. Bitz	2,971	0.84
Misc.	Misc.	374	0.10

=== 2006 ===
2006 United States House election: Oregon District 5
Party	Candidate	Votes	%
Democratic	Darlene Hooley (incumbent)	146,973	53.99
Republican	Mike Erickson	116,424	42.77
Pacific Green	Paul Aranas	4,194	1.54
Constitution	Douglas Patterson	4,160	1.53
Misc.	Misc.	483	0.18

=== 2008 ===
2008 United States House election: Oregon District 5
Party	Candidate	Votes	%
Democratic	Kurt Schrader	173,413	54.34
Republican	Mike Erickson	122,348	38.34
Independent Party (Oregon)	Sean Bates	6,450	2.02
Constitution	Douglas Patterson	6,180	1.94
Pacific Green	Alex Polikoff	4,955	1.55
Libertarian	Steve Milligan	4,577	1.43
Misc.	Misc.	1,195	0.37

=== 2010 ===
2010 United States House election: Oregon District 5
Party	Candidate	Votes	%
Democratic	Kurt Schrader (incumbent)	145,319	51.25
Republican	Scott Bruun	130,313	45.96
Pacific Green	Chris Lugo	7,557	2.67
Misc.	Misc.	367	0.13

=== 2012 ===
2012 United States House election: Oregon District 5
Party	Candidate	Votes	%
Democratic	Kurt Schrader (incumbent)	177,229	54.04
Republican	Fred Thompson	139,223	42.45
Pacific Green	Christina Lugo	7,516	2.29
Constitution	Raymond Baldwin	3,600	1.10
Misc.	Misc.	402	0.12

=== 2014 ===
2014 United States House election: Oregon District 5
Party	Candidate	Votes	%
Democratic	Kurt Schrader (incumbent)	150,944	53.7
Republican	Tootie Smith	110,332	39.3
Independent Party (Oregon)	Marvin Sannes	7,674	2.7
Constitution	Raymond Baldwin	6,208	2.2
Libertarian	Daniel K. Souza	5,198	1.8
Misc.	Misc.	732	0.3

=== 2016 ===
2016 United States House election: Oregon District 5
Party	Candidate	Votes	%
Democratic	Kurt Schrader (incumbent)	199,505	53.5
Republican	Colm Willis	160,443	43.0
Pacific Green	Marvin Sandnes	12,542	3.3
Misc.	Misc.	618	0.2

=== 2018 ===
2018 United States House election: Oregon District 5
Party	Candidate	Votes	%
Democratic	Kurt Schrader (incumbent)	197,187	55.0
Republican	Mark Callahan	149,887	41.8
Libertarian	Dan Souza	6,054	1.7
Pacific Green	Marvin Sandnes	4,802	1.3
Misc.	Misc.	539	0.2

=== 2020 ===
2020 United States House election: Oregon District 5
Party	Candidate	Votes	%
Democratic	Kurt Schrader (incumbent)	234,863	51.9
Republican	Amy Ryan Courser	204,372	45.1
Libertarian	Matthew Rex	12,640	2.8

=== 2022 ===
2022 United States House election: Oregon District 5
Party	Candidate	Votes	%
Republican	Lori Chavez-DeRemer	178,813	50.9
Democratic	Jamie McLeod-Skinner	171,514	48.8
Write-in		906	0.3

=== 2024 ===
2024 United States House election: Oregon District 5
Party	Candidate	Votes	%
Democratic	Janelle Bynum	191,365	47.7
Republican	Lori Chavez-DeRemer (incumbent)	180,420	45.0
Independent	Brett Smith	18,665	4.7
Libertarian	Sonja Feintech	6,193	1.5
Pacific Green	Andrea Thorn Townsend	4,155	1.0
Write-in		495	0.1
Total votes		401,293	100%

== Historical district boundaries ==
When created in 1983, the district was an inland district focused around the Willamette Valley, and consisted of all of Clackamas and Marion counties, as well as small parts of the counties of Benton, Linn, and Polk. In 1993, the district gained a large coastal portion from the 1st district, gaining all of Tillamook and Lincoln counties as well as the rest of Polk, whilst part of Clackamas County was lost to the 3rd district.

In the 2003 and 2013 redistrictings, the changes were only minor, as the district gained a small portion of Multnomah County from the 3rd district in 2003 but lost it again in 2013, while it lost a portion of northern Clackamas County to the 3rd district in both 2003 and 2013.

In the 2023 redistricting, the district underwent major boundary changes, as it gained all of Linn County, some of Multnomah and Clackamas counties, and parts of Deschutes County including Bend, but it lost the entire coastal section it had gained in 1993 as well as the area in Polk and Benton counties to the 1st, 4th, and 6th districts. Parts of western Marion County, including the city of Salem, were also lost to the new 6th district.

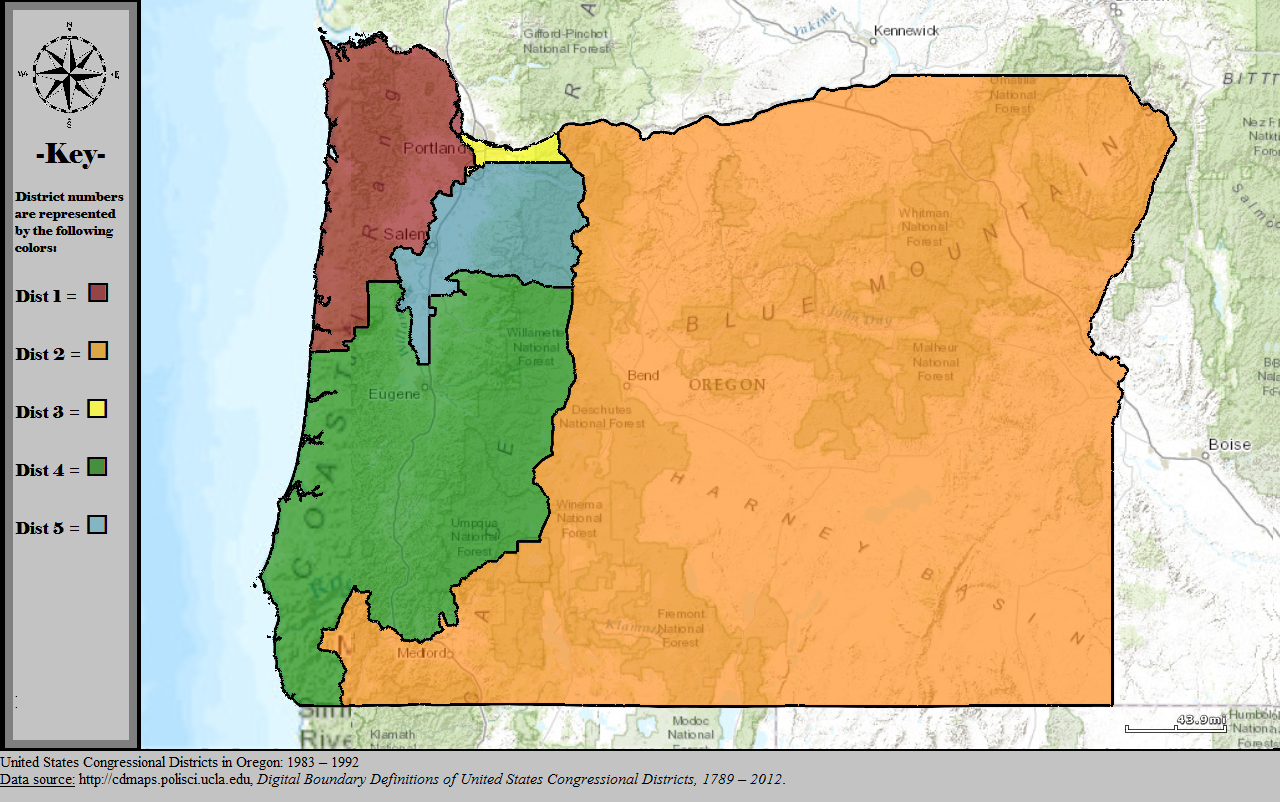
1983–1993

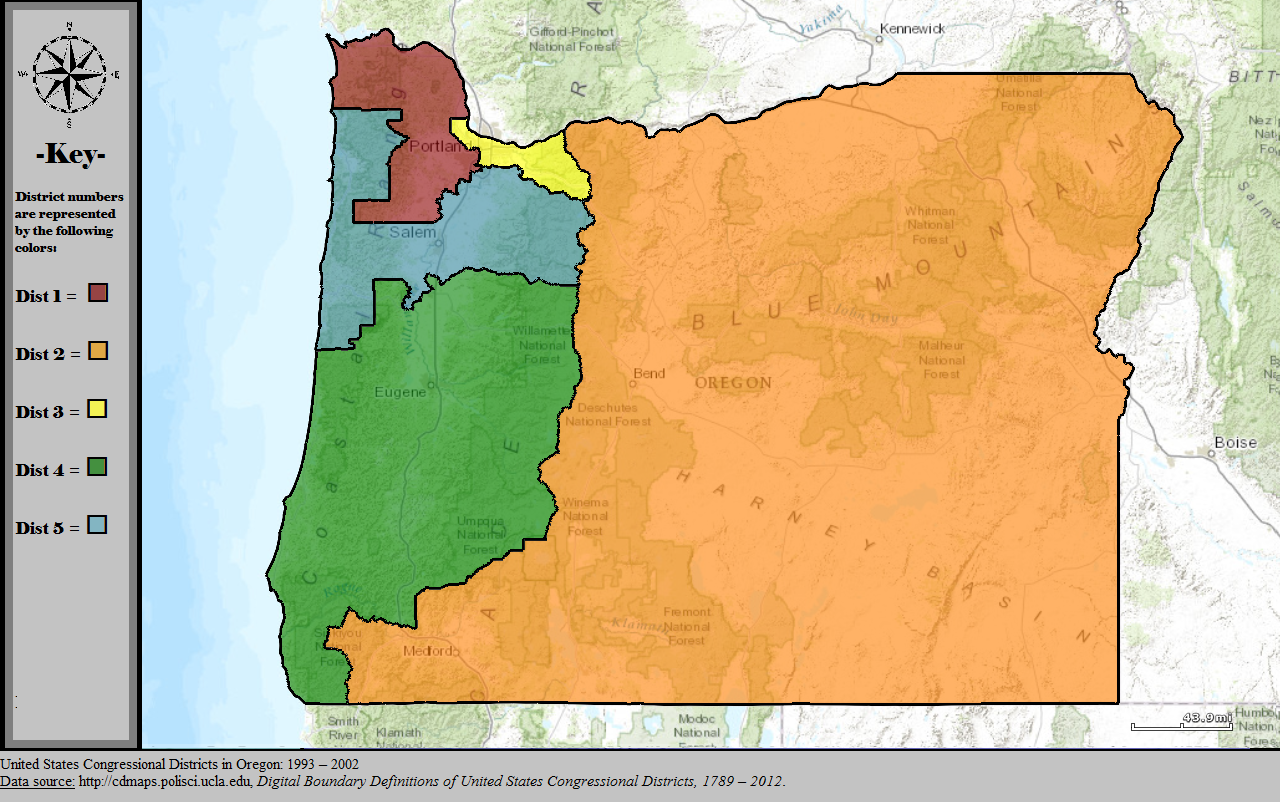
1993–2003

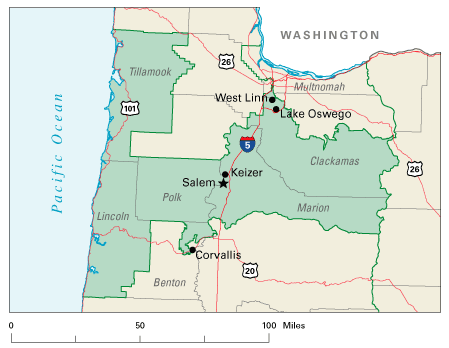
2003–2013

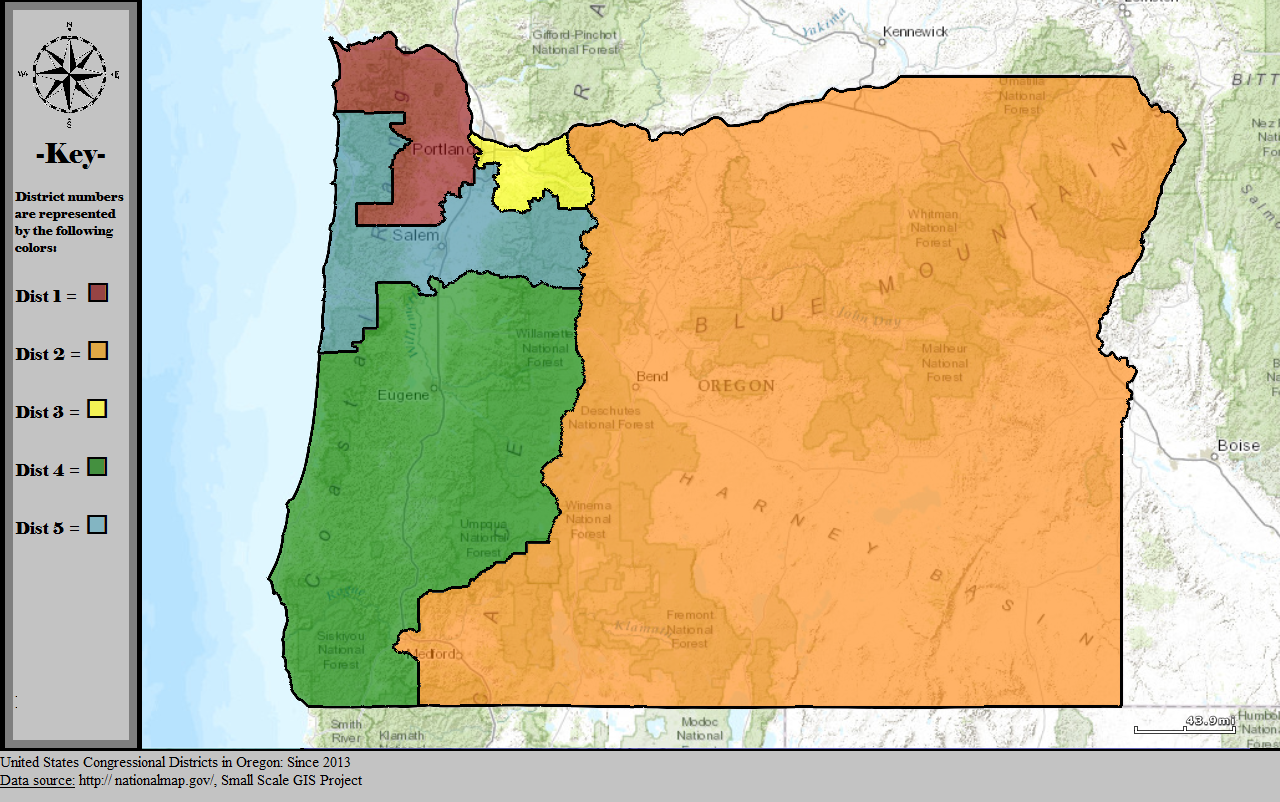
2013–2023

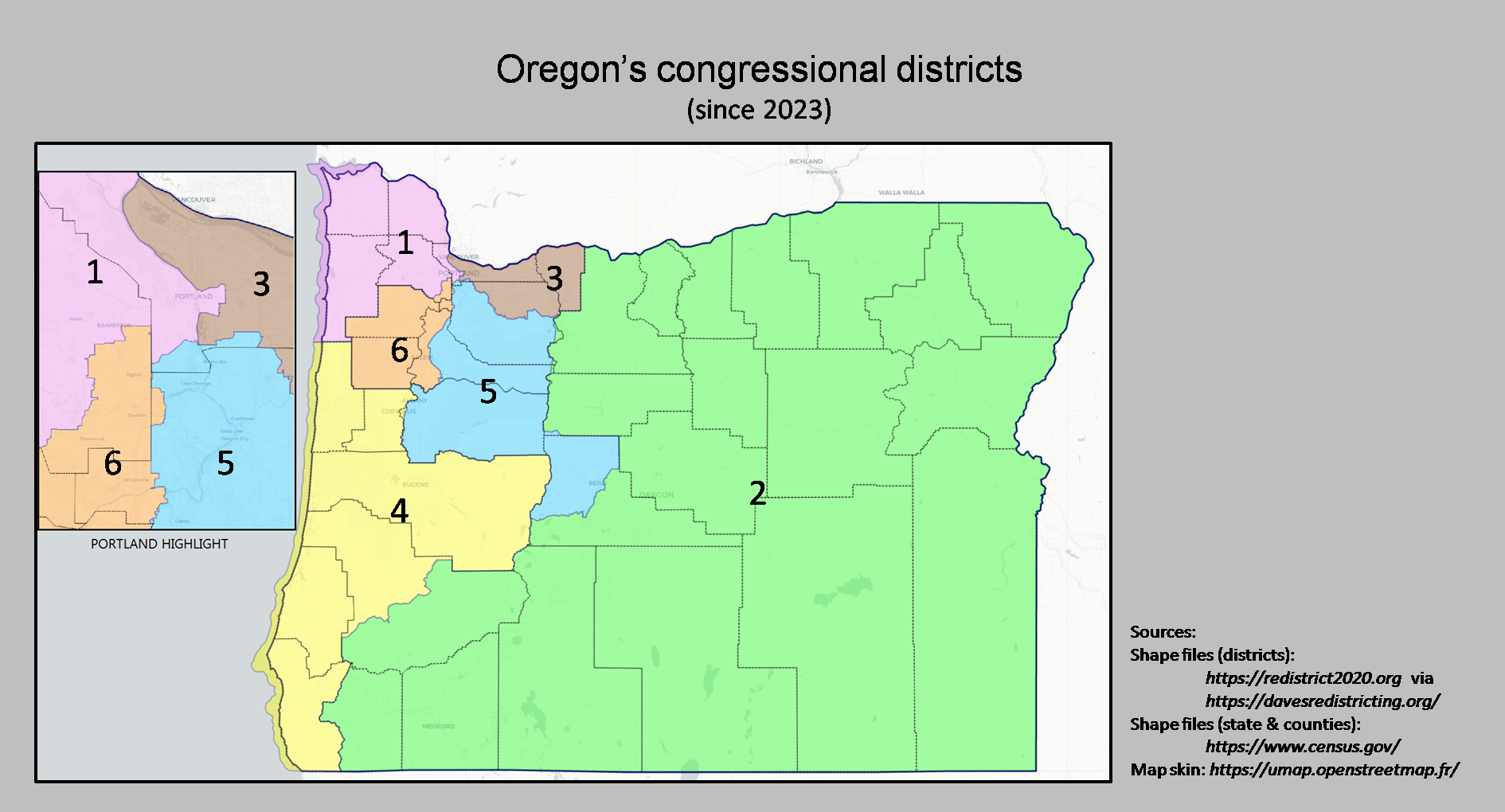
2023-2033

== See also ==
- Oregon's congressional districts
- List of United States congressional districts
