= Sarah Finger McDonald =

American politician

Member of the Oregon House of Representatives from the 16th district
- Incumbent
- Assumed office January 13, 2025
- Preceded by: Dan Rayfield

Personal details
- Born: 1973 (52 years old)
- Party: Democratic

Sarah Finger McDonald is an American Democratic politician currently serving in the Oregon House of Representatives. She represents the 16th district, which is entirely contained within Benton County and is centered around Corvallis.

== Biography ==
Finger McDonald has served as a Corvallis school board member and founded the Corvallis chapter of Moms Demand Action.

She narrowly defeated fellow Corvallis school board member Sami Al-Abdrabbuh in the Democratic primary to replace Dan Rayfield, who declined to run for re-election in order to run for Oregon Attorney General. Finger McDonald prevailed by less than 200 votes.

McDonald is a survivor of colon cancer. She was first diagnosed in February 2021, with the cancer returning in November 2022 and November 2024.

== Electoral history ==
2024 Oregon State Representative, 16th district
| Party | Candidate | Votes | % |
|---|---|---|---|
| Democratic | Sarah Finger McDonald | 24,894 | 82.8 |
| Pacific Green | Michael Bellstein | 4,781 | 15.9 |
| Write-in | | 388 | 1.3 |
| Total votes | | 30,063 | 100% |
