= 2020 Oregon Attorney General election =

- November 3, 2020
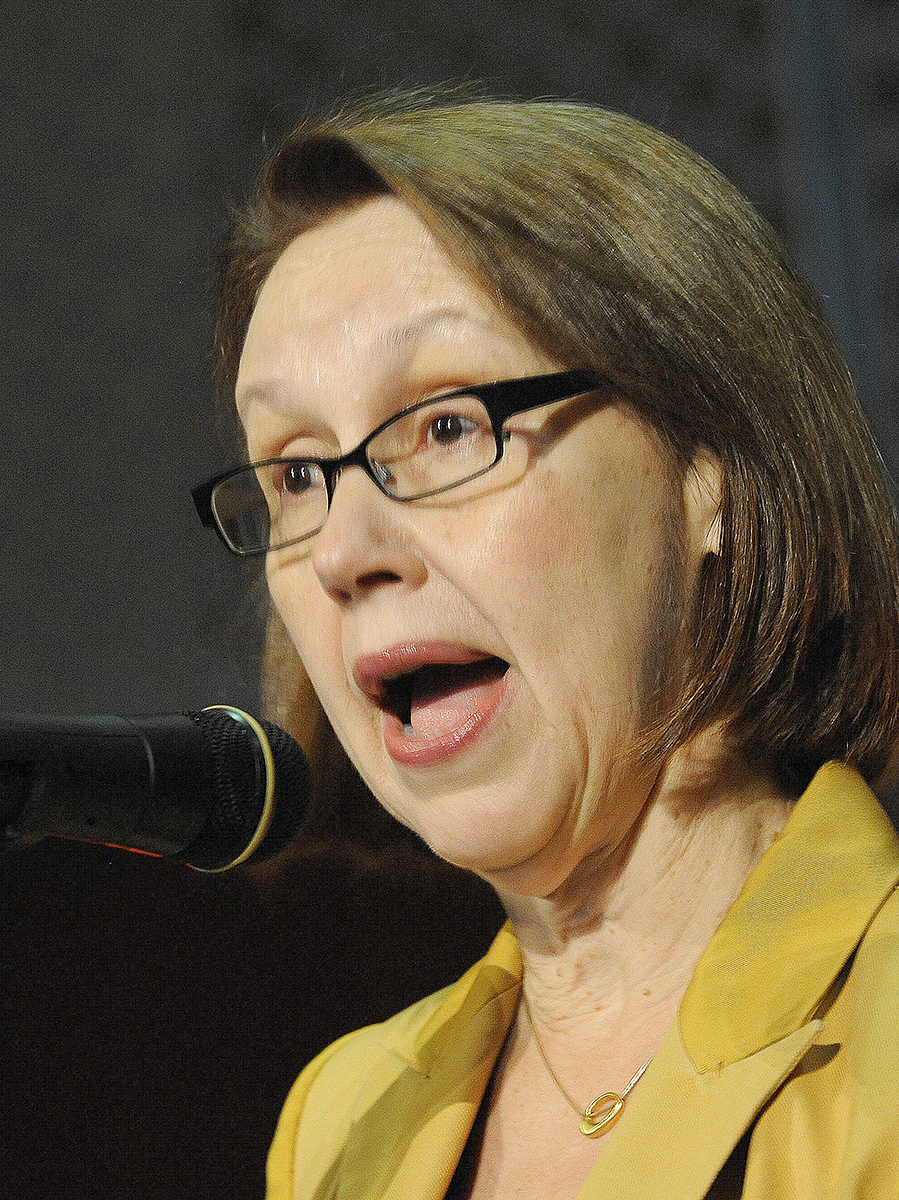

Candidate	Ellen Rosenblum	Michael Cross
Party	Democratic	Republican
Popular vote	1,264,716	934,357
Percentage	55.97%	41.35%
- Rosenblum: 40–50% 50–60% 60–70% 70–80% 80–90% >90% Cross: 40–50% 50–60% 60–70% 70–80% 80–90% >90% Tie: 40–50% 50% No data
Attorney General before election
Ellen Rosenblum
Democratic
Elected Attorney General
Ellen Rosenblum
Democratic

The 2020 Oregon Attorney General election was held on November 3, 2020, to elect the Attorney General of Oregon. Incumbent Democratic Attorney General Ellen Rosenblum was originally appointed to the role by former Governor John Kitzhaber on June 29, 2012, to finish the term of her predecessor John Kroger, who resigned from office. She was elected to a full term in 2012 and re-elected in 2016. This office is not subject to term limits, and Rosenblum won a third full term, defeating Republican activist Michael Cross who led an unsuccessful 2019 attempt to recall Governor Kate Brown.

== Democratic primary ==
=== Candidates ===
==== Declared ====
- Ellen Rosenblum, incumbent Attorney General

=== Results ===
Democratic primary results
Party	Candidate	Votes	%
Democratic	Ellen Rosenblum (incumbent)	483,273	99.04%
Write-in		4,661	0.96%
Total votes		487,934	100.0%

== Republican primary ==
=== Candidates ===
==== Declared ====
- Michael Cross, software designer and leader of an unsuccessful attempt to recall Governor Kate Brown in 2019

==== Withdrawn ====
- Daniel Zene Crowe, lawyer and Republican nominee for Attorney General in 2016 (withdrew candidacy effective March 13, 2020)

=== Results ===
Republican primary results
Party	Candidate	Votes	%
Republican	Michael Cross	279,909	96.71%
Write-in		9,537	3.29%
Total votes		289,446	100.0%

== General election ==
=== Predictions ===
Source	Ranking	As of
The Cook Political Report	Safe D	July 17, 2020

=== Results ===
2020 Oregon Attorney General election
Party	Candidate	Votes	%	±%
Democratic	Ellen Rosenblum (incumbent)	1,264,716	55.97%	+1.00%
Republican	Michael Cross	934,357	41.35%	–0.31%
Libertarian	Lars Hedbor	52,087	2.31%	–0.87%
Write-in		8,490	0.38%	+0.19%
Total votes		2,259,650	100.00%	N/A
Democratic hold				

==== By county ====
County	Ellen Rosenblum Democratic		Michael Cross Republican		Various candidates Other parties		Margin		Total
County	#	%	#	%	#	%	#	%	Total
Baker	2,314	24.72%	6,695	71.52%	352	3.76%	-4,381	-46.80%	9,361
Benton	33,950	66.88%	15,452	30.44%	1,362	2.68%	18,498	36.44%	50,764
Clackamas	127,392	52.46%	108,968	44.87%	6,488	2.67%	18,424	7.59%	242,848
Clatsop	12,513	54.36%	9,817	42.65%	688	2.99%	2,696	11.71%	23,018
Columbia	13,601	44.03%	16,167	52.33%	1,125	3.64%	-2,566	-8.31%	30,893
Coos	13,816	39.30%	20,413	58.07%	925	2.63%	-6,597	-18.77%	35,154
Crook	3,711	24.99%	10,773	72.56%	363	2.44%	-7,062	-47.57%	14,847
Curry	5,826	40.76%	8,149	57.01%	320	2.24%	-2,323	-16.25%	14,295
Deschutes	61,606	51.37%	55,445	46.23%	2,876	2.40%	6,161	5.14%	119,927
Douglas	19,090	31.01%	40,723	66.15%	1,750	2.84%	-21,633	-35.14%	61,563
Gilliam	324	28.57%	783	69.05%	27	2.38%	-459	-40.48%	1,134
Grant	939	21.19%	3,388	76.46%	104	2.35%	-2,449	-55.27%	4,431
Harney	921	21.49%	3,270	76.29%	95	2.22%	-2,349	-54.81%	4,286
Hood River	8,180	65.69%	3,983	31.99%	289	2.32%	4,197	33.71%	12,452
Jackson	56,655	46.70%	61,759	50.91%	2,904	2.39%	-5,104	-4.21%	121,318
Jefferson	4,330	37.49%	6,873	59.51%	346	3.00%	-2,543	-22.02%	11,549
Josephine	17,718	36.08%	30,016	61.11%	1,380	2.81%	-12,298	-25.04%	49,114
Klamath	10,245	29.01%	24,149	68.38%	920	2.61%	-13,904	-39.37%	35,314
Lake	767	18.36%	3,330	79.70%	81	1.94%	-2,563	-61.35%	4,178
Lane	126,956	60.42%	77,595	36.93%	5,555	2.64%	49,361	23.49%	210,106
Lincoln	16,855	56.97%	12,002	40.56%	731	2.47%	4,853	16.40%	29,588
Linn	25,656	37.16%	40,876	59.21%	2,501	3.62%	-15,220	-22.05%	69,033
Malheur	3,186	27.91%	7,898	69.18%	332	2.91%	-4,712	-41.28%	11,416
Marion	76,892	48.59%	76,073	48.07%	5,292	3.34%	819	0.52%	158,257
Morrow	1,416	28.82%	3,358	68.34%	140	2.85%	-1,942	-39.52%	4,914
Multnomah	347,007	78.85%	83,710	19.02%	9,358	2.13%	263,297	59.83%	440,075
Polk	21,901	47.07%	23,266	50.00%	1,362	2.93%	-1,365	-2.93%	46,529
Sherman	255	22.06%	872	75.43%	29	2.51%	-617	-53.37%	1,156
Tillamook	7,897	48.88%	7,870	48.72%	388	2.40%	27	0.17%	16,155
Umatilla	10,392	33.11%	19,969	63.62%	1,028	3.28%	-9,577	-30.51%	31,389
Union	4,173	29.24%	9,751	68.32%	348	2.44%	-5,578	-39.08%	14,272
Wallowa	1,548	31.34%	3,109	62.95%	282	5.71%	-1,561	-31.61%	4,939
Wasco	6,316	46.84%	6,771	50.22%	397	2.94%	-455	-3.37%	13,484
Washington	194,605	63.76%	101,992	33.42%	8,597	2.82%	92,613	30.35%	305,194
Wheeler	231	25.08%	660	71.66%	30	3.26%	-429	-46.58%	921
Yamhill	25,532	45.78%	28,432	50.98%	1,812	3.25%	-2,900	-5.20%	55,776
Totals	1,264,716	55.97%	934,357	41.35%	60,577	2.68%	330,359	14.62%	2,259,650

Counties that flipped from Republican to Democratic

- Deschutes (largest city: Bend)

Counties that flipped from Democratic to Republican

- Columbia (largest city: St. Helens)

==== By congressional district ====
Rosenblum won four of five congressional districts.

District	Rosenblum	Cross	Representative
1st	61%	36%	Suzanne Bonamici
2nd	42%	56%	Cliff Bentz
3rd	74%	24%	Earl Blumenauer
4th	51%	47%	Peter DeFazio
5th	52%	45%	Kurt Schrader
