= Oregon's 16th House district =

Legislative districts in the state of Oregon

Oregon's 16th House district after redistricting after the 2020 Census

District 16 of the Oregon House of Representatives is one of 60 House legislative districts in the state of Oregon. As of 2021, the boundary for the district is entirely within Benton County. The district is centered around Corvallis and includes Oregon State University. The current representative for the district is Democrat Sarah Finger McDonald of Corvallis.

== Election results ==
District boundaries have changed over time. Therefore, representatives before 2021 may not represent the same constituency as today. General election results from 2000 to present are as follows:

Year	Candidate	Party	Percent	Opponent	Party	Percent	Opponent	Party	Percent	Opponent	Party	Percent	Write-in percentage
2000	Jeff Merkley	Democratic	83.54%	David Tillemans	Pacific Green	16.46%	No third candidate			No fourth candidate			
2002 (Note: Kelley Wirth was the incumbent in this election. She previously represented District 35, but was moved to this district due to redistricting following the 2000 United States census.)	Kelley Wirth	Democratic	68.29%	Scott Bisson	Republican	31.47%	No third candidate			No fourth candidate			0.23%
2004	Kelley Wirth	Democratic	62.51%	Don Gist	Republican	34.78%	Jared Ellefson	Libertarian	2.70%	No fourth candidate			
2006 (Note: Sara Gelser was the incumbent in this election. She was appointed to this seat on November 29, 2005 to replace Kelley Wirth, who resigned from office.)	Sara Gelser	Democratic	67.37%	Robin Brown	Republican	32.45%	No third candidate			No fourth candidate			0.18%
2008	Sara Gelser	Democratic	97.00%	Unopposed									3.00%
2010	Sara Gelser	Democratic	68.77%	Rose Cook	Republican	30.94%	No third candidate			No third candidate			0.29%
2012	Sara Gelser	Democratic	69.96%	Andrew Decker	Republican	26.58%	Rachel Feigner	Libertarian	3.17%	No third candidate			0.29%
2014	Dan Rayfield	Democratic	72.12%	Jacob Vandever	Republican	27.39%	No third candidate			No third candidate			0.19%
2016	Dan Rayfield	Democratic	58.05%	Judson McClure	Republican	20.97%	Sami Al-AbdRabbuh	Progressive	15.98%	Andrew Freborg	Libertarian	4.81%	0.19%
2018	Dan Rayfield	Democratic	97.44%	Unopposed									2.56%
2020	Dan Rayfield	Democratic	75.86%	Jason Hughes	Republican	23.87%	No third candidate			No fourth candidate			0.27%
2022	Dan Rayfield	Democratic	75.17%	Keith Lembke	Republican	24.61%	No third candidate			No fourth candidate			0.22%
2024	Sarah Finger McDonald	Democratic	82.81%	Michael Beilstein	Pacific Green	15.90%	No third candidate			No fourth candidate			1.29%

== See also ==
- Oregon Legislative Assembly
- Oregon House of Representatives
