= 2016 Oregon Ballot Measure 100 =

Measure 100
- Wildlife Trafficking Prevention Act: Prohibits purchase or sale of parts or products from certain wildlife species; exceptions; civil penalties

Results
Choice	Votes	%
Yes	1,306,213	69.45%
No	574,631	30.55%
Total votes	1,880,844	100.00%
Results by county
Yes
50%-60%
60%-70%
70%-80%
80%-90%
No
50%-60%
60%-70%

Oregon Ballot Measure 100, titled the Wildlife Trafficking Prevention Act, is a ballot measure in the 2016 election in the U.S. state of Oregon. The measure prohibits the purchase, sale, or possession with intent to sell products and parts from specified nonnative wildlife species, specifically elephant, rhinoceros, whale, tiger, lion, leopard, cheetah, jaguar, pangolin, sea turtle, shark, and ray. The ballot measures created several exceptions for activities for law enforcement purposes, activities authorized by federal law, transfers of certain antiques and musical instruments, certain donations for scientific or educational purposes, and non-commercial transfers through gifts or inheritance, and well as for possession by enrolled members of federally recognized tribes. The ballot measure largely banned, among other things, the ivory trade in the state.

Prior to the passage of Measure 100, the only nonnative animal product banned from sale in the state was shark fin. Measure 100 followed the unsuccessful proposal of similar legislation in the Oregon State Legislature in 2015.

The measure was supported by wildlife conservation organizations, such as WildAid, the International Fund for Animal Welfare, Wildlife Conservation Society, National Wildlife Federation, and Association of Zoos and Aquariums. There were no statements in opposition to the measure filed for the state voters' pamphlet.

Measure 100 was broadly approved by Oregon voters with just over sixty-nine percent of them voting in favor, winning the bulk of its support in 24 of the state's 36 counties. The measure took effect on July 1, 2017.

Vote tallies by county:

County	Yes	Votes	No	Votes	Total
Baker	44.52	3,739	55.48	4,659	8,398
Benton	75.88	35,159	24.12	11,174	46,333
Clackamas	68.45	136,636	31.55	62,966	199,602
Clatsop	65.25	12,159	34.75	6,476	18,635
Columbia	58.72	14,762	41.28	10,377	25,139
Coos	58.61	17,754	41.39	12,358	30,292
Crook	48.66	5,674	51.34	5,988	11,662
Curry	61.74	7,349	38.26	4,555	11,904
Deschutes	69.02	64,932	30.98	29,148	94,080
Douglas	55.04	27,887	44.96	22,781	50,668
Gilliam	44.34	435	55.66	546	981
Grant	41.65	1,721	58.35	2,411	4,132
Harney	38.05	1,451	61.95	2,362	3,813
Hood River	73.15	7,632	26.85	2,802	10,434
Jackson	66.34	68,308	33.66	34,652	102,960
Jefferson	55.99	5,050	44.01	3,968	9,018
Josephine	61.44	25,765	38.56	16,167	41,932
Klamath	54.66	15,959	45.34	13,237	29,196
Lake	42.72	1,592	57.28	2,135	3,727
Lane	73.38	133,522	26.62	48,435	181,957
Lincoln	69.06	16,739	30.94	7,501	24,240
Linn	58.16	32,371	41.84	23,290	55,661
Malheur	42.32	4,175	57.68	5,691	9,866
Marion	65.13	83,266	34.87	44,585	127,851
Morrow	46.23	1,848	53.77	2,149	3,997
Multnomah	82.24	304,290	17.76	65,706	369,996
Polk	65.69	25,224	34.31	13,171	38,395
Sherman	42.25	409	57.75	559	968
Tillamook	62.97	8,299	37.03	4,880	13,179
Umatilla	50.35	13,074	49.65	12,893	25,967
Union	48.05	5,909	51.95	6,388	12,297
Wallowa	48.09	2,011	51.91	2,171	4,182
Wasco	61.19	6,853	38.81	4,345	11,198
Washington	72.96	183,987	27.04	68,199	252,186
Wheeler	43.80	346	56.20	444	790
Yamhill	65.93	29,926	34.07	15,462	45,388

== See also ==
- Pangolin trade
