= Dan Rayfield =

American politician

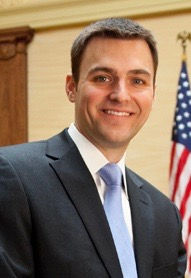

18th Attorney General of Oregon
- Incumbent
- Assumed office December 31, 2024
- Governor: Tina Kotek
- Preceded by: Ellen Rosenblum

68th Speaker of the Oregon House of Representatives
- In office February 1, 2022 – March 7, 2024
- Preceded by: Paul Holvey (acting)
- Succeeded by: Julie Fahey

Member of the Oregon House of Representatives from the 16th district
- In office January 12, 2015 – December 31, 2024
- Preceded by: Sara Gelser Blouin
- Succeeded by: Sarah Finger McDonald

Personal details
- Born: March 1, 1979 (age 47) Orange County, California, U.S.
- Party: Democratic
- Spouse: Amanda
- Children: 1
- Education: Western Oregon University (BA); Willamette University (JD)
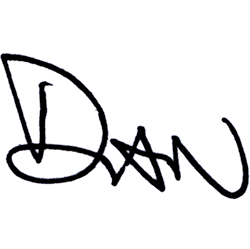
- Signature
- Website: Official website

Daniel Adam Rayfield (born March 1, 1979) is an American politician and attorney who has been the 18th attorney general of the state of Oregon since 2024, after his predecessor Ellen Rosenblum resigned a week before her term expired. He was speaker of the Oregon House of Representatives from 2022 to 2024. In the House, he represented the 16th district, which included Corvallis and Adair Village.

In November 2024, he was elected Attorney General of Oregon after defeating Republican Will Lathrop in the general election.

== Early life and education ==
Rayfield was born in Orange County, California. His mother was an activist and small-business owner who reveled in dragging her son throughout his youth to events promoting progressive causes. His father, a retired colonel in the Air Force Reserve Command and commercial insurance executive, had more-conservative views.

After moving to Oregon, Rayfield attended Tigard High School. He later graduated from Western Oregon University in 2003 and earned his Juris Doctor from Willamette University College of Law.

== Career ==
While in law school, Rayfield worked as a clerk in the Benton County District Attorney's Office, gaining trial experience prosecuting misdemeanors and DUIs.

After law school, Rayfield began his legal career working for the Weatherford Thompson law firm in Albany, Oregon. His practice initially focused on general civil litigation. In 2007, Rayfield served as plaintiff's attorney in a high-profile case involving a police officer who wrongfully arrested several individuals under false DUII accusations.

Following a successful resolution to the case, Rayfield worked to help pass HB 2318 during the 2009 legislative session of the Oregon Legislative Assembly. HB 2318 allowed people who were falsely accused of driving under the influence to remove the false charge from their record. The bill passed unanimously in the Oregon House and Senate and was signed into law by the governor on June 18, 2009.

In May 2009, Rayfield joined the law firm of Nelson & MacNeil. His practice focused on representing individuals with claims against corporations and insurance companies. In 2014, Rayfield became a partner with the law firm, changing the firm's name to Nelson MacNeil Rayfield Trial Attorneys PC.

=== Oregon House of Representatives ===
Rayfield was sworn in as a state representative from House District 16 on January 12, 2015.

During the 2015 legislative session, Rayfield served on the House Committee on Rules, the Joint Committee on Ways and Means, as co-chair of the Joint Ways and Means Subcommittee on Natural Resources, and as vice chairman of the House Committee on Consumer Protection and Government Effectiveness. During the session Rayfield acted as a key facilitator, successfully negotiating a bipartisan solution to shore-up a $30 million shortfall with the Oregon Department of Fish and Wildlife budget.

Following the 2015 legislative session, Rayfield was elected by his colleagues to serve as House majority whip. During the interim in 2015 Rayfield was also appointed co-chair of the Joint Committee on Ways and Means Subcommittee on Public Safety.

In the 2016 legislative session, Rayfield sponsored several key bills that were eventually signed into law. In particular, he successfully shepherded legislation extending unemployment insurance benefits for up to an additional six months to locked-out workers, which immediately impacted 180 Steelworkers locked-out of the Allegheny Technologies plant in Albany, Oregon.

Rayfield was named a "Rising Star" by the Oregon League of Conservation Voters (OLCV) in its 2015 Environmental Scorecard. He was recognized by OLCV for his work as co-chair of the Ways and Means Subcommittee on Natural Resources, and specifically his efforts to forge compromise to address a $30 million budget shortfall for the Oregon Department of Fish and Wildlife.

In 2015, Rayfield was also chosen by the Council of State Governments West (CSG West), a nonpartisan, nonprofit organization serving state legislators of both parties in 13 Western states, as a participant in its training institute for lawmakers in their first four years of service.

On February 1, 2022, Rayfield was sworn in as the speaker of Oregon House of Representatives. He stepped down as Speaker of the House following the conclusion of the 2024 legislative session to run for attorney general.

=== 2024 Oregon Attorney General campaign ===
On October 11, 2023, Rayfield announced his campaign for Oregon Attorney General in the 2024 election. He won the Democratic primary in the May 2024 primary election. On November 5, 2024, Rayfield defeated Republican Will Lathrup in the general election.

== Personal life ==
In the community, Rayfield has served in numerous roles, including commissioner on the Linn-Benton Housing Authority, member of the New Roots Housing Board, past president of the Linn-Benton Bar Association, past chair of the Linn and Benton Judicial Screening Committee, past president of the Majestic Theater Management Board, former Linn County Peer Court judge, and coach of the Oregon State University Mock Trial team.

== Electoral history ==
2010 Oregon State Senator, 8th district
Party	Candidate	Votes	%
Republican	Frank Morse	26,466	55.0
Democratic	Dan Rayfield	21,563	44.8
Write-in		123	0.3
Total votes		48,152	100%

2014 Oregon State Representative, 16th district
Party	Candidate	Votes	%
Democratic	Dan Rayfield	16,797	72.1
Republican	Jacob D Vandever	6,379	27.4
Write-in		113	0.5
Total votes		23,289	100%

2016 Oregon State Representative, 16th district
Party	Candidate	Votes	%
Democratic	Dan Rayfield	17,921	58.1
Republican	Judson McClure	6,474	21.0
Progressive	Sami Al-AbdRabbuh	4,934	16.0
Libertarian	Andrew Freborg	1,484	4.8
Write-in		58	0.2
Total votes		30,871	100%

2018 Oregon State Representative, 16th district
Party	Candidate	Votes	%
Democratic	Dan Rayfield	23,158	97.4
Write-in		609	2.6
Total votes		23,767	100%

2020 Oregon State Representative, 16th district
Party	Candidate	Votes	%
Democratic	Dan Rayfield	25,742	75.9
Republican	Jason Hughes	8,099	23.9
Write-in		91	0.3
Total votes		33,932	100%

2022 Oregon State Representative, 16th district
Party	Candidate	Votes	%
Democratic	Dan Rayfield	22,483	75.2
Republican	Keith Lembke	7,362	24.6
Write-in		65	0.2
Total votes		29,910	100%

2024 Oregon Attorney General election
Party	Candidate	Votes	%
Democratic	Dan Rayfield	1,156,489	54.4
Republican	Will Lathrop	967,964	45.5
Write-in		2,612	0.1
Total votes		2,127,065	100%

Political offices
Preceded by Tina Kotek	Speaker of the Oregon House of Representatives; 2022–2024	Succeeded by Julie Fahey
Legal offices
Preceded by Ellen Rosenblum	Attorney General of Oregon; 2024–present	Incumbent
