= Oregon Attorney General =

Statutory office in the state of Oregon, United States

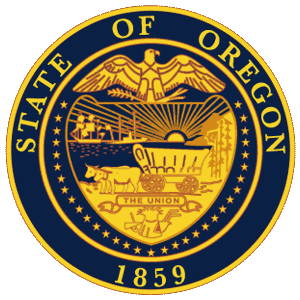
- Great Seal of the State of Oregon

Details of Office
- Branch: Executive
- Type: Partisan
- Selection: Statewide election
- Term: 4 years, renewable with no limit
- Authority: ORS 180.010
- Established: 1891

Incumbent
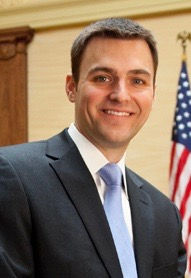
- Name: Dan Rayfield
- Party: Democratic
- Term start: 2025
- Term end: 2029

The Oregon attorney general is a statutory officer within the executive branch of the state of Oregon, and serves as the chief legal officer of the state, heading its Department of Justice with its six operating divisions. The attorney general is chosen by statewide partisan election to serve a term of four years. The incumbent, Dan Rayfield, was sworn in on December 31, 2024, replacing Ellen Rosenblum, a Democrat who was re-elected in 2020 and resigned one week before the end of her term.

== Duties ==
The attorney general represents the state of Oregon in all court actions and other legal proceedings in which it is a party or has an interest. They also conduct all legal business of state departments, boards and commissions that require legal counsel. Ballot titles for measures in Oregon elections are written by the attorney general, who also and appoints the assistant attorneys general who serve as counsel to the various state departments, boards and commissions.

The attorney general provides written opinions upon any question of law in which any government entity within the state may have an interest when requested by the governor, any state agency official or any member of the legislature, but is prohibited by law from rendering opinions or giving legal advice to any other persons or agencies.

== History ==
=== Original 1891 mandate ===
An Act to Create the Office of Attorney-General, Provide the Duties and fix the Compensation, was enacted by the state legislature in 1891. Oregon's is only one of five state offices of Attorney General created by statute rather than by a provision of the constitution. The act established elections for the office, to be held every four years, any vacancy in the office to be filled by the governor until the next general election.

The act provided that the attorney general be charged with litigating on behalf of the state, any "breach of contract, any bond or contract in which the state was interested," at the request of the governor, secretary of state, treasurer, superintendent of public instruction, or any state board. The attorney general was also to prosecute or defend all matters of interest to the state in the Supreme Court. Upon request, they could provide counsel and advice to county district attorneys. A requirement was also included for the keeping of records of opinions and official proceedings for future successors.

Criminal investigation and prosecution was not included in the original mandate for the office, but remained with the various county district attorneys. The office was also charged with the preparation of contracts, bonds, and other documents when requested.

=== 1947 reorganization ===
The role of the attorney general was greatly expanded, when the legislature created the Department of Justice and placed the attorney general at its head with the passage of An Act Creating the department of justice, prescribing its jurisdiction, and defining the powers and duties of the attorney general.

In addition to the attorney general's existing role as attorney in all state-related supreme court cases, the act added that, when required by the governor or legislature, he would appear for the state in any court or tribunal.

Through the newly created Justice Department, the attorney general would now have control and supervision of all civil actions and legal proceedings in which the state was a party or interested. The office was also given full control of all the legal business of all state offices, legal services performed by outside counsel being specifically prohibited.

The attorney general's relationship to district attorneys was also expanded to include authority to require their assistance in cases brought before the Supreme Court from their respective counties. The act provided authority to take charge of any investigation or prosecution in which the circuit court had jurisdiction, when directed by the governor. This provision provided the attorney general all the powers of a district attorney, including the calling of the county grand jury to convene.

The act also created the office of deputy attorney general, appointed by the attorney general with full authority to act on their behalf, and provided statutory, discretionary authority for the appointment of assistant attorneys general.

=== Later developments ===
The attorney general was provided with subpoena power in criminal investigations in 1993, and in 2002, the office was given additional powers relative to investigation and prosecution in organized crime cases.

== List of attorneys general of Oregon ==
The following table provides a list of the individuals who have served as Oregon Attorney General, with party affiliation and dates of service.

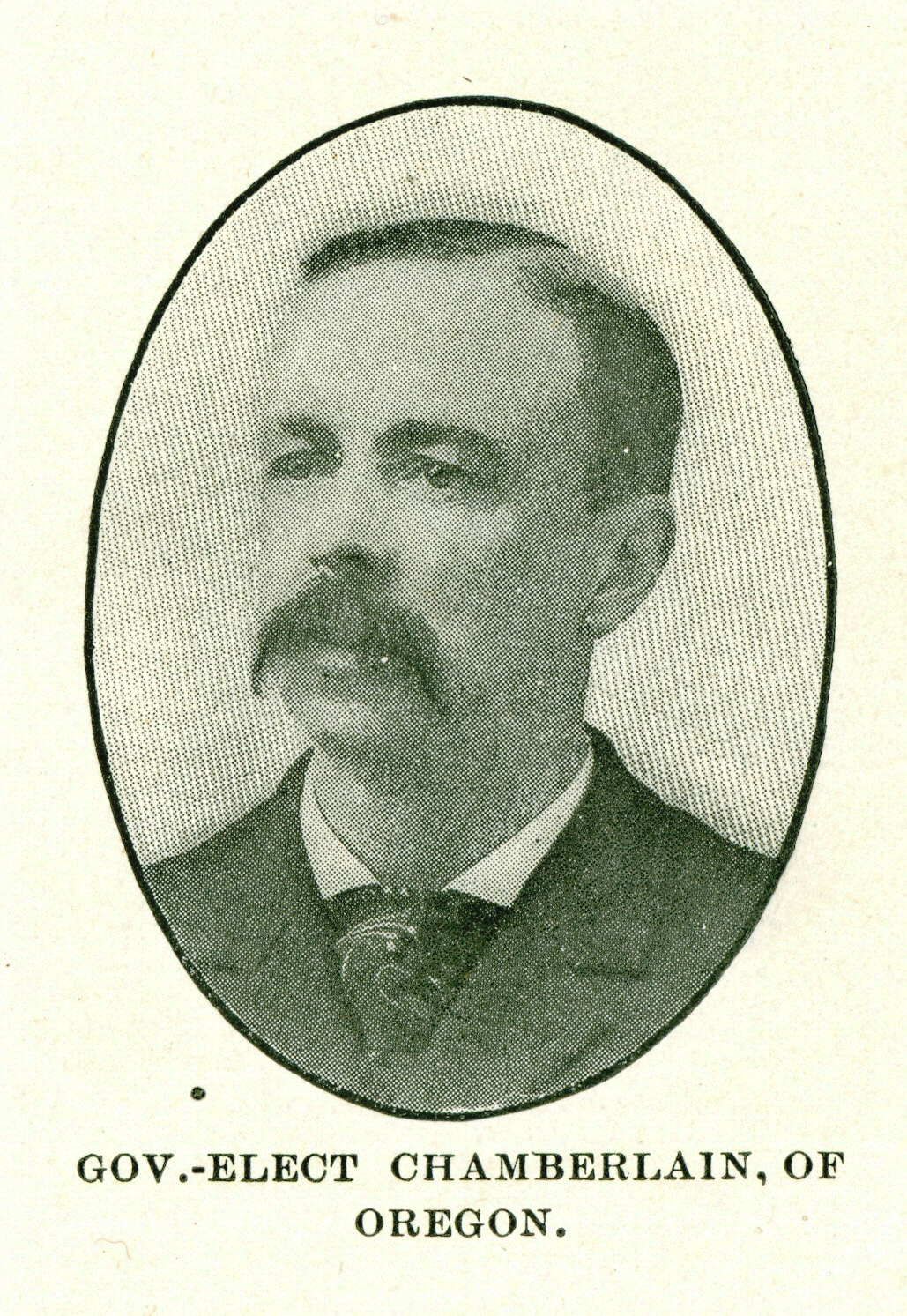
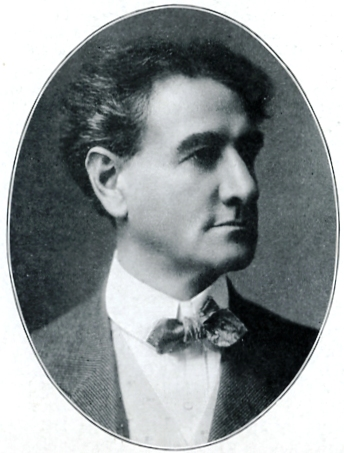
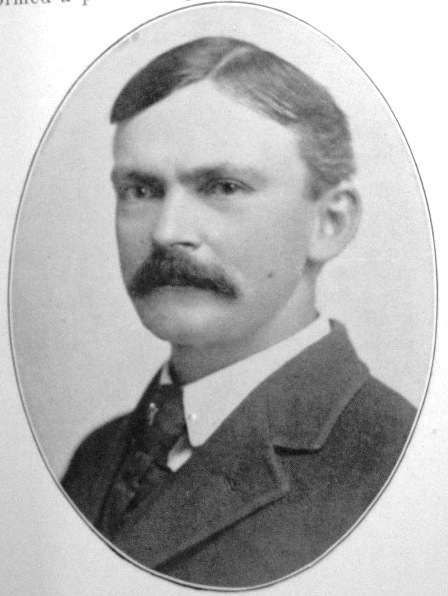
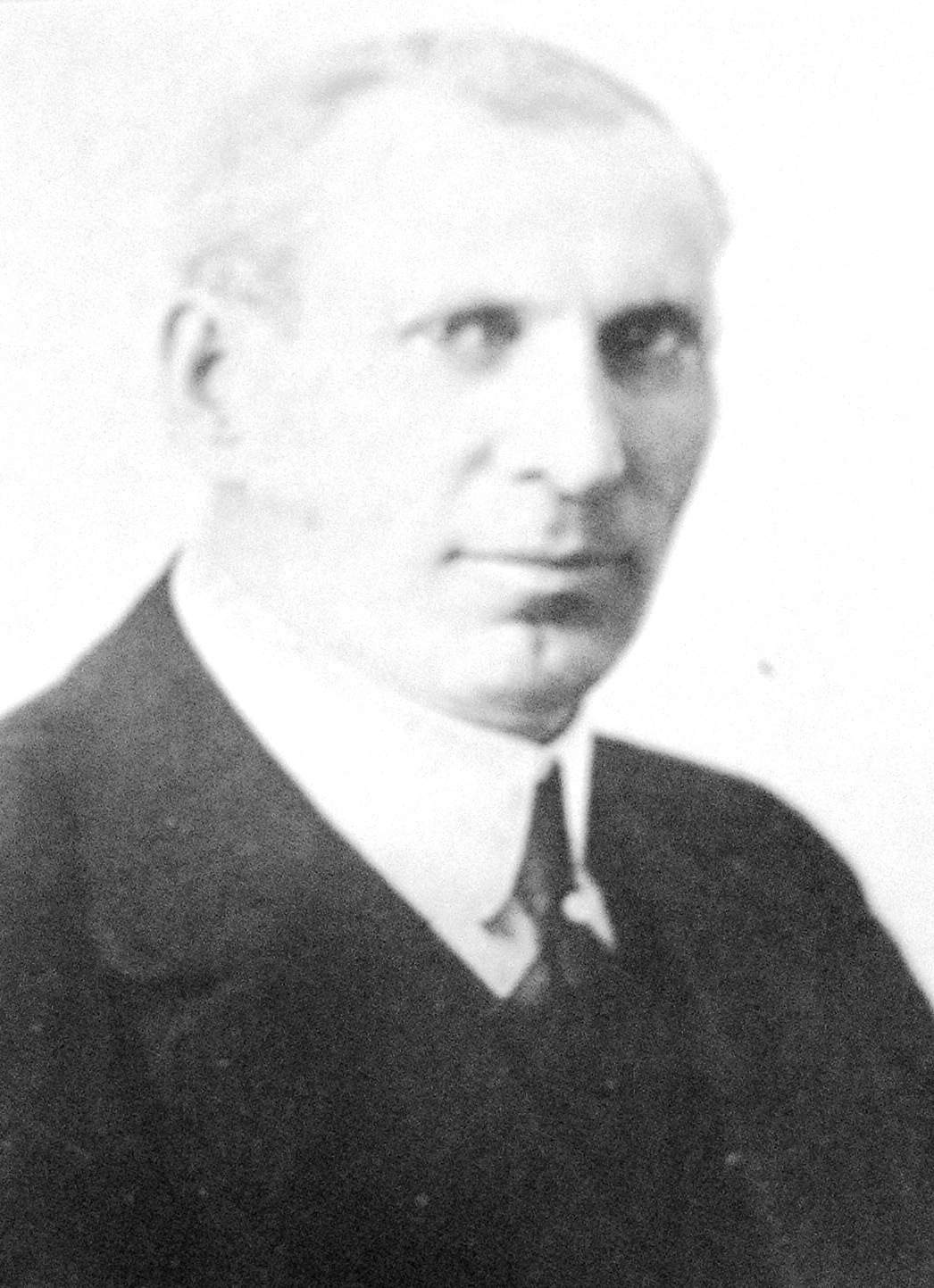
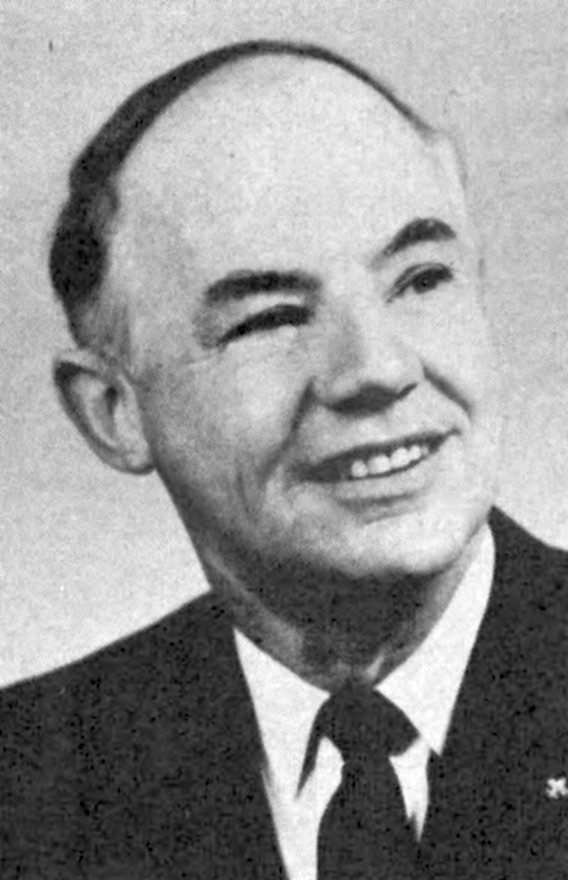
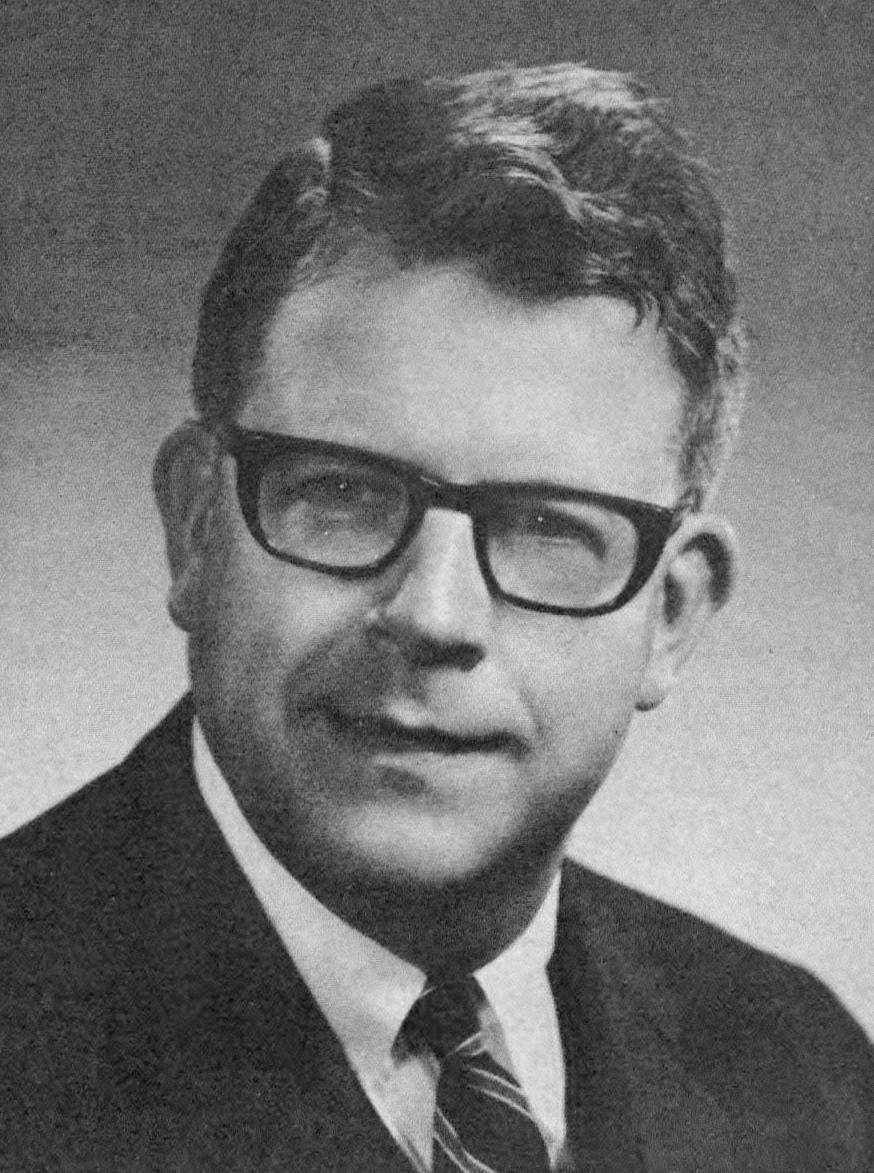
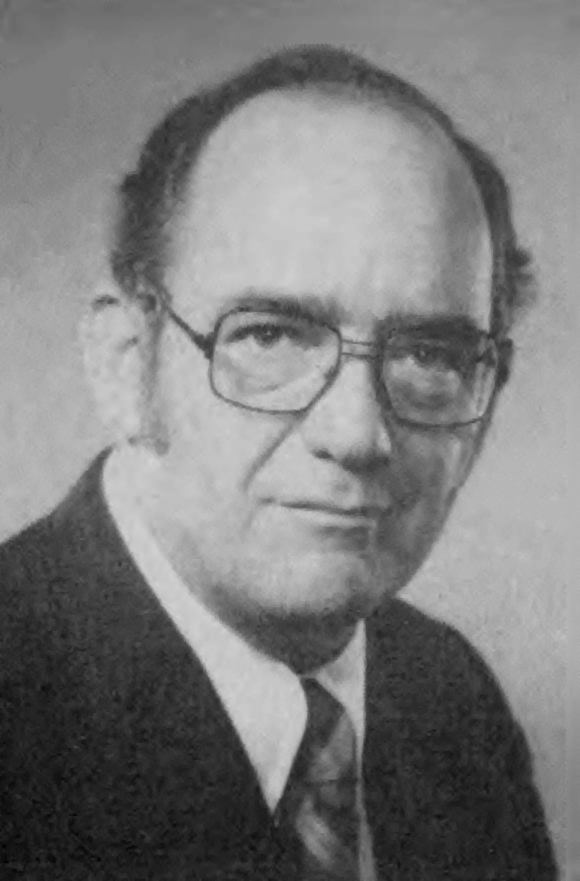
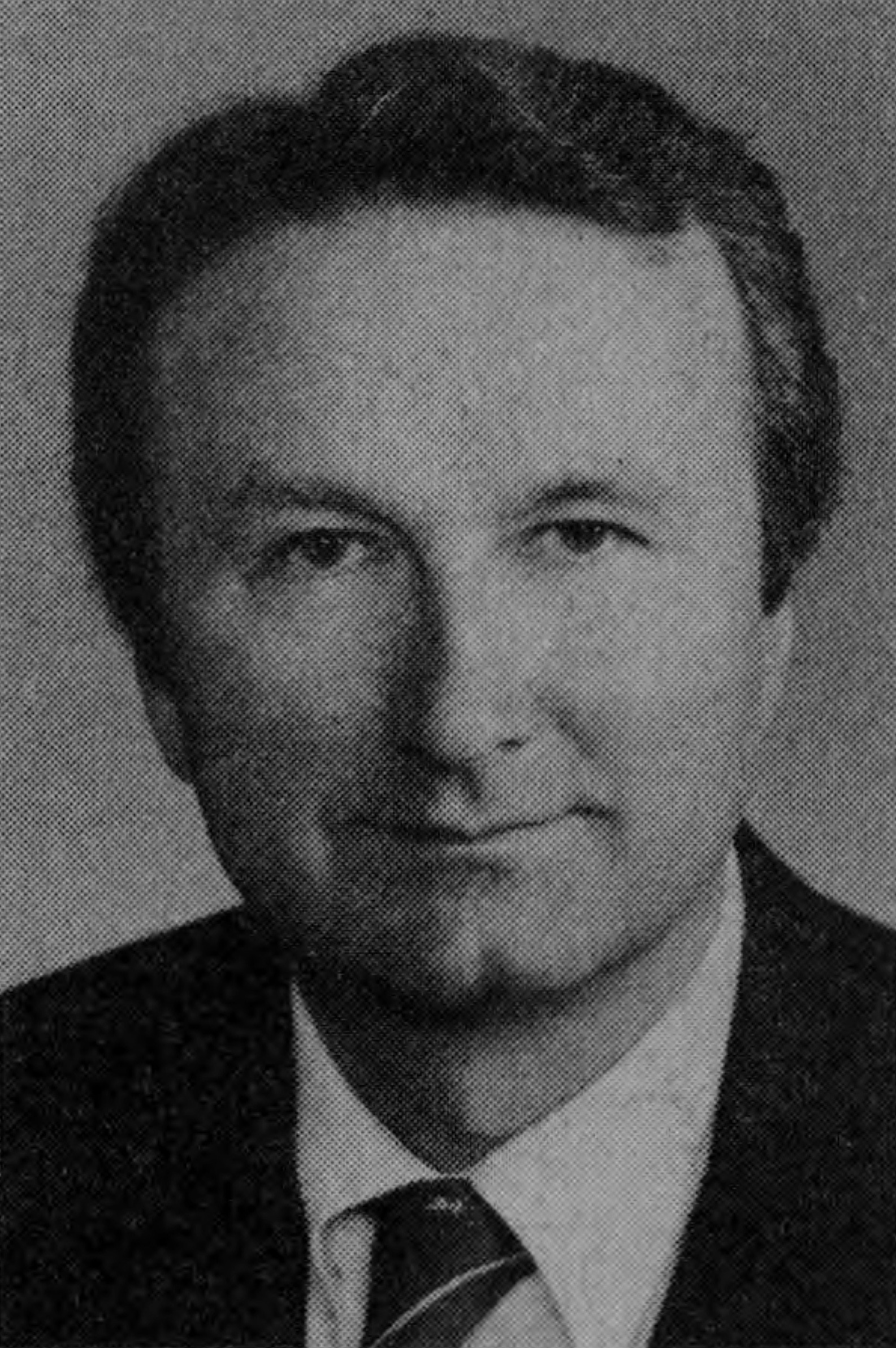
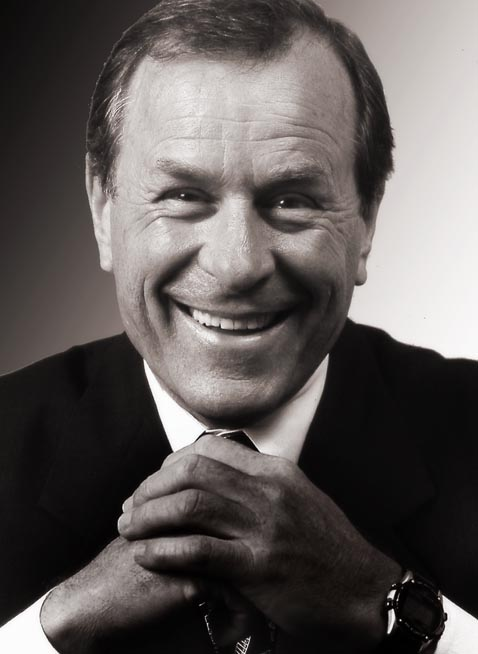
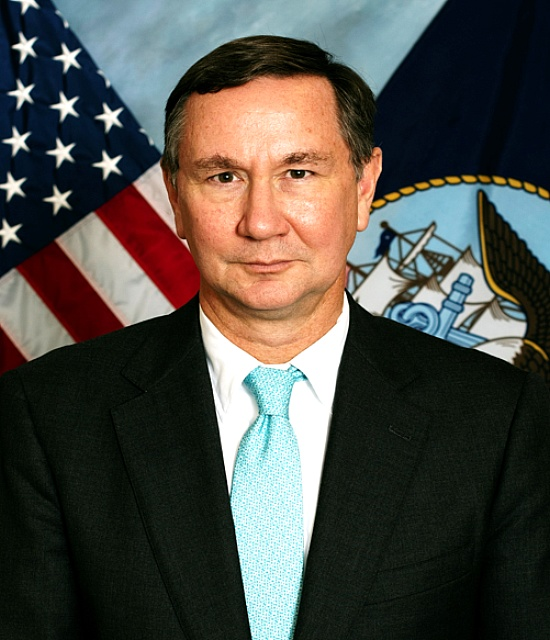
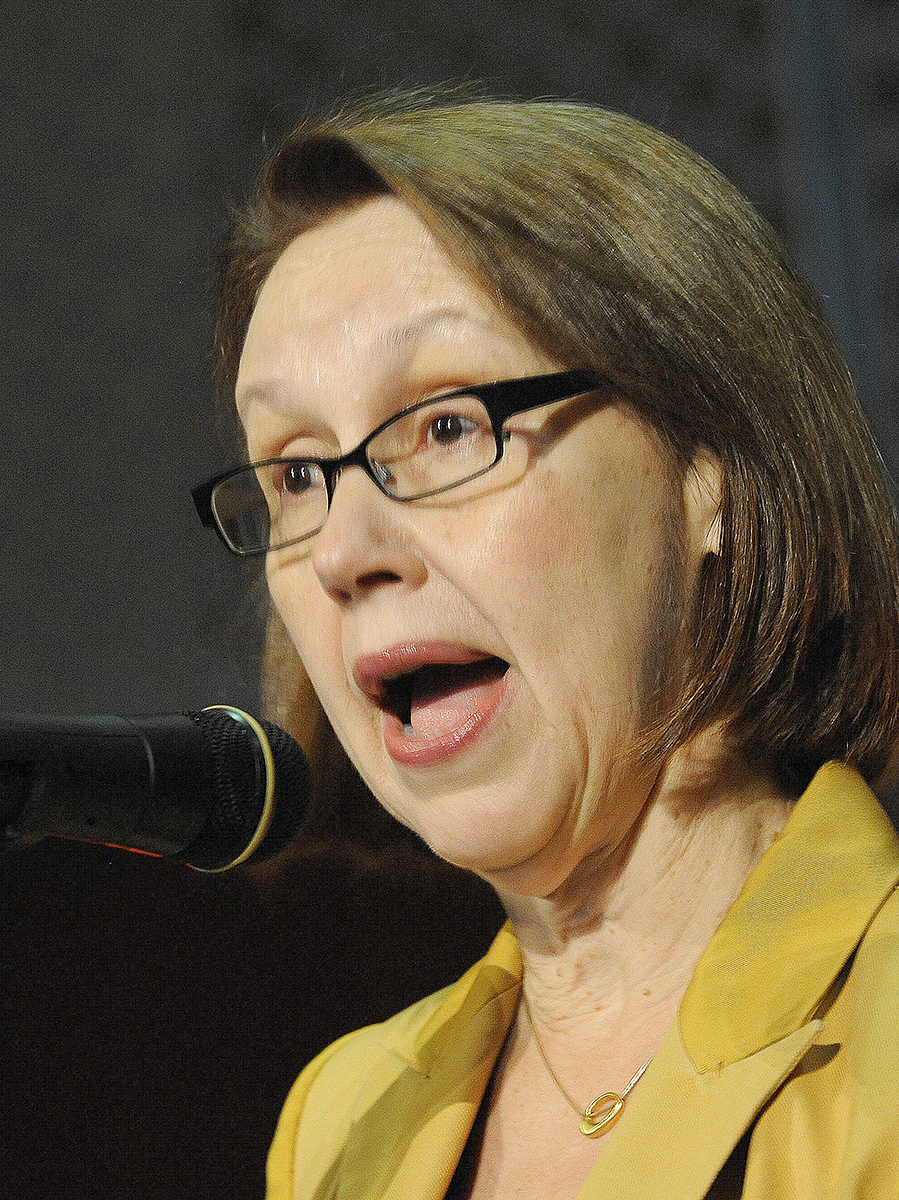
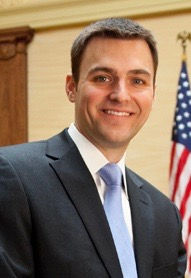
#	Image	Name	Party	Term	Notes
1		George E. Chamberlain	Democratic	May 20, 1891 – January 14, 1895	Appointed by Gov. Pennoyer, elected June 1892
2		Cicero M. Idleman	Republican	January 1, 1895 – January 9, 1899	Elected June 1894
3		D. R. N. Blackburn	Republican	January 9, 1899 – January 12, 1903	Elected June 1898
4		Andrew M. Crawford	Republican	January 13, 1903 – January 3, 1915	Elected June 1902, reelected 1906, 1910
5		George M. Brown	Republican	January 4, 1915 – October 14, 1920	Elected Nov. 1914, reelected 1920, resigned
6		Isaac H. Van Winkle	Republican	October 14, 1920 – December 14, 1943	Appointed by Gov. Olcott, elected Nov. 1920, reelected 1924, 1928, 1932, 1936, 1940, died in office
7		George Neuner	Republican	December 21, 1943 – January 5, 1953	Appointed by Gov. Snell, elected Nov. 1944, reelected 1948
8		Robert Y. Thornton	Democratic	January 5, 1953 – May 20, 1969	Elected Nov. 1952, reelected 1956, 1960, 1964
9		Lee Johnson	Republican	May 20, 1969 – January 3, 1977	Elected Nov. 1968, reelected 1972
10		James A. Redden	Democratic	January 3, 1977 – March 24, 1980	Elected Nov. 1976
11		James M. Brown	Democratic	March 24, 1980 – January 4, 1981	Appointed by Gov. Atiyeh
12		David B. Frohnmayer	Republican	January 5, 1981 – December 31, 1991	Elected Nov. 1980, reelected 1984, 1988, resigned
13		Charles S. Crookham	Republican	January 2, 1992 – January 3, 1993	Appointed by Gov. Roberts
14		Ted Kulongoski	Democratic	January 4, 1993 – January 4, 1997	Elected Nov. 1992
15		Hardy Myers	Democratic	January 4, 1997 – January 5, 2009	Elected Nov. 1996, reelected 2000, 2004
16		John Kroger	Democratic	January 5, 2009 – June 29, 2012	Elected Nov. 2008, resigned
17		Ellen Rosenblum	Democratic	June 29, 2012 – 2024	Appointed by Gov. Kitzhaber, elected Nov. 2012, resigned one week before her term ends
18		Dan Rayfield	Democratic	December 31, 2024–present	Elected in 2024, took office one week early

== See also ==
- Attorney General
- Government of Oregon
- State Attorney General
