= 2016 Oregon elections =

- November 8, 2016

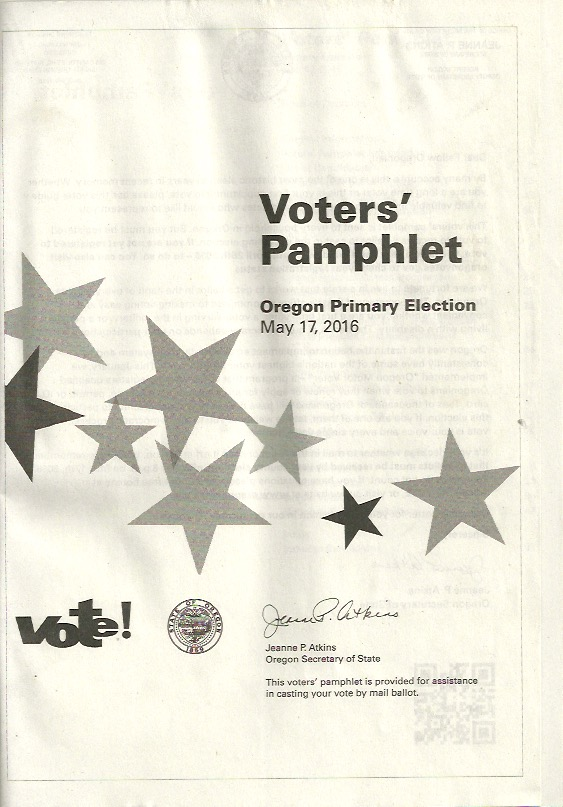
Oregon voters' pamphlet, mailed to voters before the May 2016 primary elections

A general election was held in the U.S. state of Oregon on November 8, 2016. Primary elections were held on May 17, 2016.

== Federal ==
=== President of the United States ===
Hillary Clinton won the state's seven electoral votes.

=== United States House of Representatives ===
All five of Oregon's seats in the United States House of Representatives were up for re-election in 2016. All five incumbents, four Democrats and one Republican, won re-election.

=== United States Senate ===
Incumbent Democratic senior Senator Ron Wyden won re-election to a fourth full term in office.

== Attorney General ==
2016 Oregon Attorney General election
- November 8, 2016
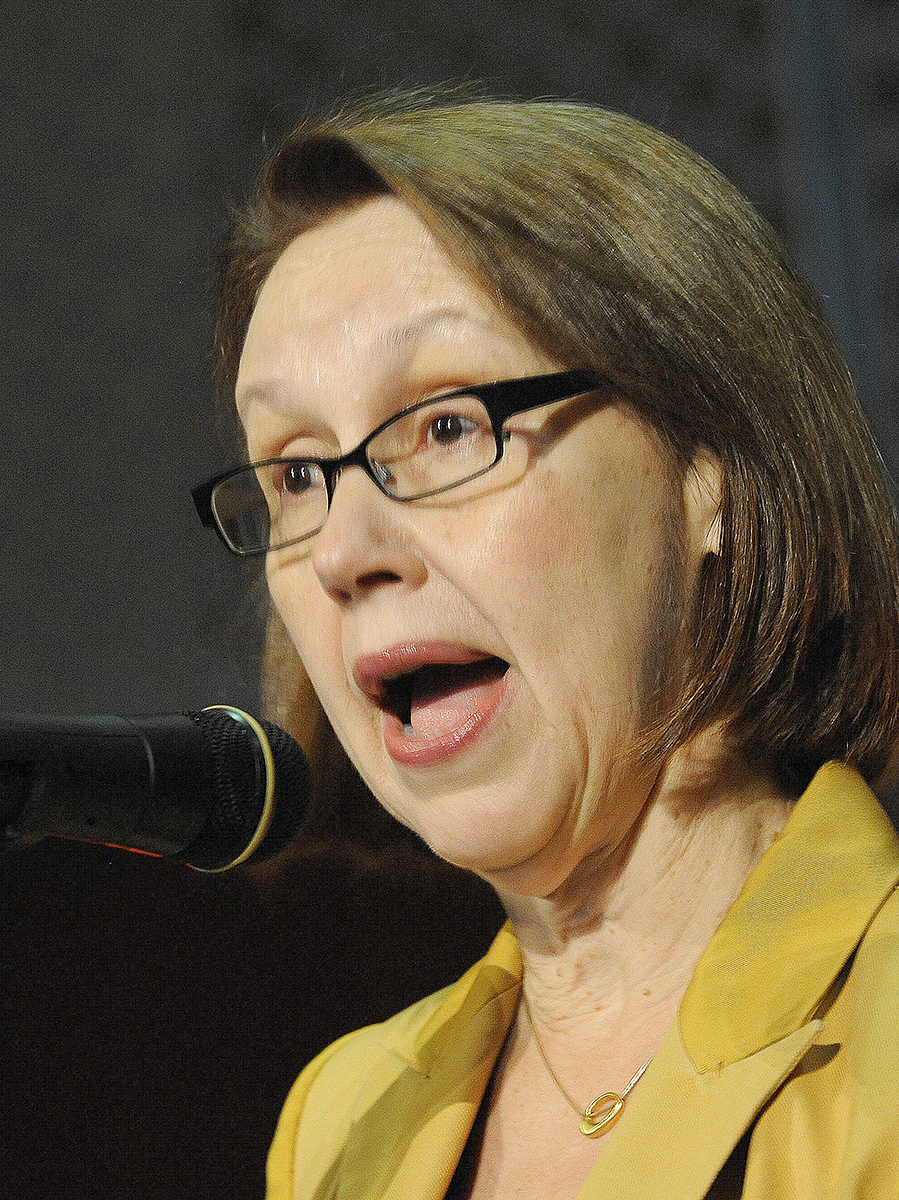

| Nominee | Ellen Rosenblum | Daniel Crowe |
| Party | Democratic | Republican |
| Popular vote | 1,011,761 | 766,753 |
| Percentage | 55.0% | 41.7% |
- Rosenblum: 40–50% 50–60% 60–70% 70–80% Crowe: 40–50% 50–60% 60–70% 70–80%
Attorney General before election
Ellen Rosenblum
Democratic
Elected Attorney General
Ellen Rosenblum
Democratic

Incumbent attorney general Ellen Rosenblum (D) was re-elected.

=== Democratic primary ===
==== Nominee ====
- Ellen Rosenblum, incumbent attorney general

==== Results ====
Democratic primary results
| Party | Candidate | Votes | % |
|---|---|---|---|
| Democratic | Ellen Rosenblum | 425,670 | 98.85% |
| Write-in | | 4,973 | 1.15% |
| Total votes | | 430,643 | 100.0% |

=== Republican primary ===
==== Nominee ====
- Daniel Zene Crowe, lawyer

==== Results ====
Republican primary results
| Party | Candidate | Votes | % |
|---|---|---|---|
| Republican | Daniel Zene Crowe | 227,985 | 98.64% |
| Write-in | | 3,138 | 1.36% |
| Total votes | | 231,123 | 100.0% |

=== Independent Party primary ===
==== Results ====
Independent Party primary results
| Party | Candidate | Votes | % |
|---|---|---|---|
| Independent Party | Ellen Rosenblum (incumbent) (write-in) | 4,629 | 54.79% |
| Write-in | | 3,820 | 45.21% |
| Total votes | | 8,449 | 100.0% |

=== General election ===
==== Predictions ====
| Source | Ranking |
|---|---|
| Governing | Safe D |

==== Results ====
2016 Oregon Attorney General election
| Party | Candidate | Votes | % | ±% |
|---|---|---|---|---|
| Democratic | Ellen Rosenblum (incumbent) | 1,011,761 | 54.97% | –1.20% |
| Republican | Daniel Crowe | 766,753 | 41.66% | +2.52% |
| Libertarian | Lars Hedbor | 58,609 | 3.18% | N/A |
| Write-in | | 3,507 | 0.19% | +0.01% |
| Total votes | | 1,840,630 | 100.0% | |
| Democratic hold | | | | |

== Governor ==
This election determined who would fill the remaining two years of the term of Democratic governor John Kitzhaber, who was re-elected in 2014 and resigned in 2015. The incumbent governor was Democrat Kate Brown, who succeeded to the governor's office as Oregon Secretary of State. Brown won re-election; the next gubernatorial election would be in 2018.

== Secretary of State ==
Incumbent Democratic Secretary of State Jeanne Atkins declined to seek election; she was appointed in March 2015 following Kate Brown's ascension to the governorship.

Dennis Richardson (R) defeated Brad Avakian (D), to become the first (and as of 2024, only) Republican to win a statewide election in Oregon since 2002.

=== Democratic primary ===
- Brad Avakian, Oregon Commissioner of Labor and Industries, former state senator and representative
- Richard Devlin, state senator and former state representative
- Val Hoyle, state representative

==== Results ====
Oregon Secretary of State Democratic primary, 2016
| Party | Candidate | Votes | % |
|---|---|---|---|
| Democratic | Brad Avakian | 199,214 | 38.94 |
| Democratic | Val Hoyle | 173,915 | 33.99 |
| Democratic | Richard Devlin | 134,388 | 26.27 |
| Democratic | Write-ins | 4,110 | 0.80 |
| Total votes | | 511,627 | 100 |

=== Republican primary ===
- Sid Leiken, Lane County Commissioner
- Dennis Richardson, former state representative

==== Results ====
Oregon Secretary of State Republican primary, 2016
| Party | Candidate | Votes | % |
|---|---|---|---|
| Republican | Dennis Richardson | 260,622 | 77.89 |
| Republican | Sid Leiken | 71,992 | 21.51 |
| Republican | Write-ins | 2,006 | 0.60 |
| Total votes | | 334,620 | 100 |

=== Independent Party primary ===
- Paul Damian Wells, machinist and perennial candidate

==== Results ====
Oregon Secretary of State Independent primary, 2016
| Party | Candidate | Votes | % |
|---|---|---|---|
| Independent Party | Paul Damian Wells | 16,458 | 65.89 |
| Independent Party | Write-ins | 8,519 | 34.11 |
| Total votes | | 24,977 | 100 |

=== Other candidates ===
- Sharon Durbin, candidate for U.S. House District 2 in 2014 (Libertarian)
- Michael P. Marsh, perennial candidate (Constitution)
- Alan Zundel, former political scientist and former professor at the University of Nevada, Las Vegas (Pacific Green)

=== General election ===
==== Endorsements ====
Dennis Richardson
- Betsy Johnson, State Senator (D)
- Brad Witt, State Representative (D)
- Philip D. Lang, former Speaker of the House (D)

Newspapers

- The Bulletin
- The Daily Astorian
- East Oregonian
- Mail Tribune
- News-Register
- The Oregonian
- Portland Tribune
- The Register-Guard
- Statesman Journal
- Willamette Week

==== Polling ====
| Poll source | Date(s) administered | Sample size | Margin of error | Brad Avakian (D) | Dennis Richardson (R) | Paul Damian Wells (I) | Other | Undecided |
|---|---|---|---|---|---|---|---|---|
| DHM Research | October 25–29, 2016 | 504 | ± 4.4% | 27% | 32% | 3% | 5% | 28% |
| DHM Research | October 6–13, 2016 | 600 | ± 4% | 29% | 34% | 4% | 8% | 24% |
| iCitizen | September 2–7, 2016 | 610 | ± 4.0% | 29% | 26% | 4% | 5% | 36% |
| Clout Research | July 9–13, 2016 | 701 | ± 3.71% | 36% | 41% | — | — | 12% |

=== General election ===
County results

Oregon Secretary of State election, November 8, 2016
| Party | Candidate | Votes | % |
|---|---|---|---|
| Republican | Dennis Richardson | 903,623 | 47.06% |
| Democratic | Brad Avakian | 834,529 | 43.47% |
| Independent Party | Paul Wells | 66,210 | 3.45% |
| Pacific Green | Alan Zundel | 48,946 | 2.55% |
| Libertarian | Sharon Durbin | 47,675 | 2.48% |
| Constitution | Michael Marsh | 15,372 | 0.80% |
| | Write-ins | 3,594 | 0.19% |
| Total votes | | 1,919,949 | 100% |

== State Treasurer ==
Incumbent treasurer Ted Wheeler (D) was term-limited and successfully ran for mayor of Portland. Tobias Read (D) was elected to succeed him.

== Legislative ==
The Democrats had an 18–12 majority in the Oregon State Senate in the previous session. Of 30 Senate seats, 16 were up for election. In the Oregon House of Representatives, in which Democrats held a 35–25 majority, all 60 seats were up for election.

== Ballot measures ==
There were seven statewide Oregon ballot measures on the November 2016 ballot:

- Measure 94 — Amends Constitution: Eliminates mandatory retirement age for state judges
- Measure 95 — Amends Constitution: Allows investments in equities by public universities to reduce financial risk and increase investments to benefit students
- Measure 96 — Amends Constitution: Dedicates 1.5% of state lottery net proceeds to funding support services for Oregon veterans
- Measure 97 — Increases corporate minimum tax when sales exceed $25 million; funds education, healthcare, senior services
- Measure 98 — Requires state funding for dropout-prevention, career and college readiness programs in Oregon high schools
- Measure 99 — Creates "Outdoor School Education Fund," continuously funded through Lottery, to provide outdoor school programs statewide
- Measure 100 — Prohibits purchase or sale of parts or products from certain wildlife species; exceptions; civil penalties

== See also ==
- Elections in Oregon
- Portland, Oregon mayoral election, 2016
