= Ellen Rosenblum =

American politician (born 1961)

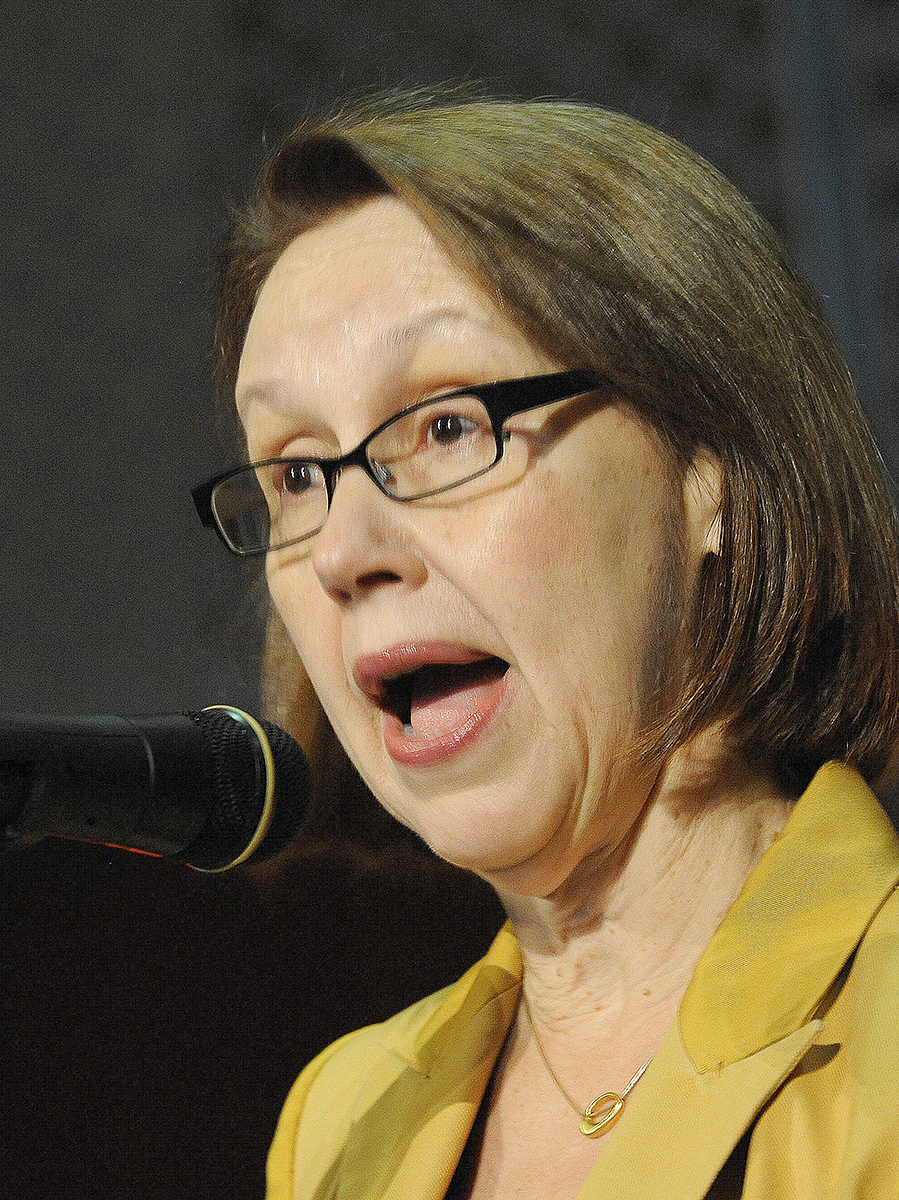

17th Attorney General of Oregon
- In office June 29, 2012 – December 31, 2024
- Governor: John Kitzhaber; Kate Brown; Tina Kotek
- Preceded by: John Kroger
- Succeeded by: Dan Rayfield

Personal details
- Born: January 6, 1951 (age 74) Berkeley, California, U.S.
- Political party: Democratic
- Spouse: Richard Meeker
- Education: Scripps College; University of Oregon (BA, JD)

Ellen F. Rosenblum (born January 6, 1951) is an American lawyer and politician who served as the 17th Oregon Attorney General from June 2012 to December 2024. She is the first female state attorney general in Oregon's history, and previously was a judge on the Oregon Court of Appeals from 2005 to 2011.

== Early life ==
Rosenblum was born in Berkeley, California, one of eight children of Jewish parents Victor and Louise Rosenblum. The family moved to Evanston, Illinois, where her father was a law professor at Northwestern University for 40 years; he was also president of Reed College from 1968 to 1970. She graduated from Evanston Township High School and attended Scripps College before earning her undergraduate degree from the University of Oregon in 1971, where she also earned a J.D. degree in 1975.

== Law and judicial career ==
In 1975, Rosenblum became an associate at the Eugene law firm of Hammons, Phillips and Jensen, and later became a partner in the firm. In 1980, she became an Assistant U.S. Attorney for the District of Oregon, specializing in financial crimes. In 1989, she was appointed by Governor Neil Goldschmidt as a judge to the Multnomah County District Court where she presided until 1993, when Governor Barbara Roberts appointed her as a judge on the Multnomah County Circuit Court. In 2005, Governor Ted Kulongoski appointed her to fill a vacancy on the Oregon Court of Appeals, and she was elected to a full six-year term in 2006, and retired as a judge in May 2011.

== Attorney General ==
After Attorney General John Kroger decided not to seek another term, Rosenblum in January 2012 started her campaign for the Democratic nomination for the position. U.S. Attorney Dwight Holton also entered the race, and held an early fundraising advantage with the support of most of the state's law enforcement community. Rosenblum focused on social issues, and when Holton criticized the Oregon Medical Marijuana Act, Rosenblum gained the support of Oregon marijuana legalization supporters by pledging to "make marijuana enforcement a low priority, and protect the rights of medical marijuana patients." In the May Democratic primary, she went on to defeat Holton by nearly 30 percentage points to move on to the general election.

In 2012, Kroger announced his resignation effective June 29, 2012, to become President of Reed College, and Governor John Kitzhaber named Rosenblum to replace Kroger effective that same day. Coincidentally, Rosenblum's father, Victor Rosenblum, had served as President of Reed from 1968 to 1970. Rosenblum became Oregon's first female Attorney General. She served in the appointed position until January and won the general election in November for a full term. Though no Republican filed in the primary, Portland attorney James Buchal received enough write-in votes to qualify for the November ballot as a Republican.

Rosenblum was re-elected to another term as attorney general in November 2016, defeating Republican candidate Daniel Crowe. She also served on the Executive Committee of the Democratic Attorneys General Association.

In July 2020, Rosenblum filed a lawsuit against the federal government, accusing it of unlawfully detaining protesters, after footage emerged of agents in unmarked vehicles (but not unmarked police officers) appearing to forcefully seize protesters.

On September 19, 2023, Rosenblum announced she would not seek a 4th term as attorney general in the 2024 election. During her last year in office, Rosenblum served as President of the National Attorneys General Association

== Personal life ==
Rosenblum is married to Richard Meeker, who until 2015 was the publisher and co-owner of the Willamette Week newspaper in Portland. The couple have two adult children.

== Electoral history ==
2006 Judge of the Oregon Court of Appeals, Position 9
Party	Candidate	Votes	%
Nonpartisan	Ellen F. Rosenblum	802,565	98.3
Write-in		13,606	1.7
Total votes		816,171	100%

2012 Oregon Attorney General Democratic Primary election
Party	Candidate	Votes	%
Democratic	Ellen Rosenblum	202,935	64.53
Democratic	Dwight Holton	110,891	35.26
Democratic	Write-ins	657	0.21

2012 Oregon Attorney General election
Party	Candidate	Votes	%
Democratic	Ellen Rosenblum	917,627	56.2
Republican	James L Buchal	639,363	39.1
Constitution	James E Leuenberger	45,451	2.8
Progressive	Chris Henry	28,187	1.7
Write-in		2,975	0.2
Total votes		1,633,603	100%

2016 Oregon Attorney General election
Party	Candidate	Votes	%
Democratic	Ellen Rosenblum	1,011,761	55.0
Republican	Daniel Zene Crowe	766,753	41.7
Libertarian	Lars D H Hedbor	58,609	3.2
Write-in		3,507	0.2
Total votes		1,840,630	100%

2020 Oregon Attorney General election
Party	Candidate	Votes	%
Democratic	Ellen Rosenblum	1,264,716	56.0
Republican	Michael Cross	934,357	41.3
Libertarian	Lars D H Hedbor	52,087	2.3
Write-in		8,490	0.4
Total votes		2,259,650	100%

== See also ==
- List of female state attorneys general in the United States
- List of Jewish American jurists

Legal offices
Preceded by John Kroger	Attorney General of Oregon; 2012–2024	Succeeded by Dan Rayfield
