= 2022 Oregon gubernatorial election =

- November 8, 2022
- Turnout: 66.91% ▼
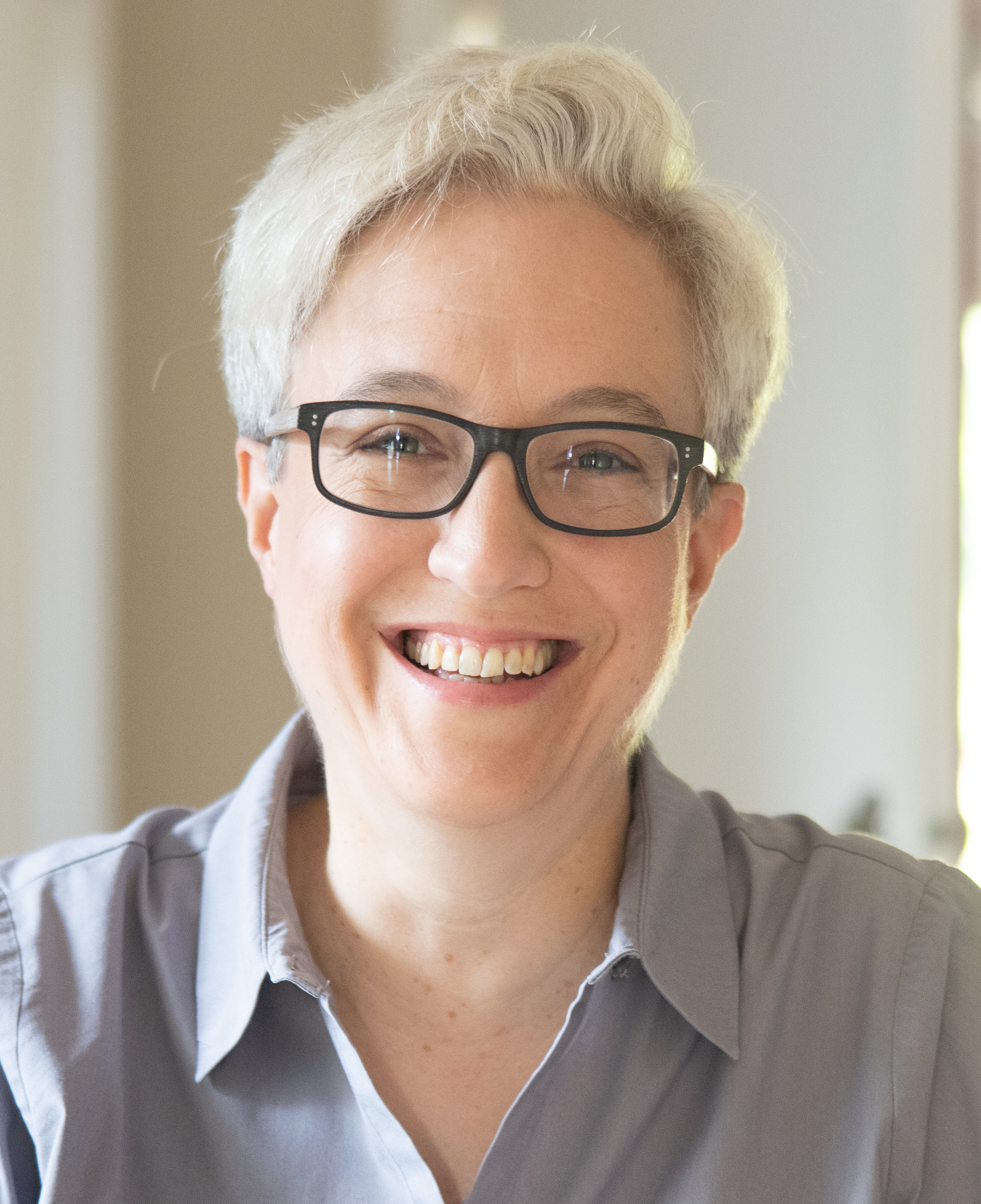

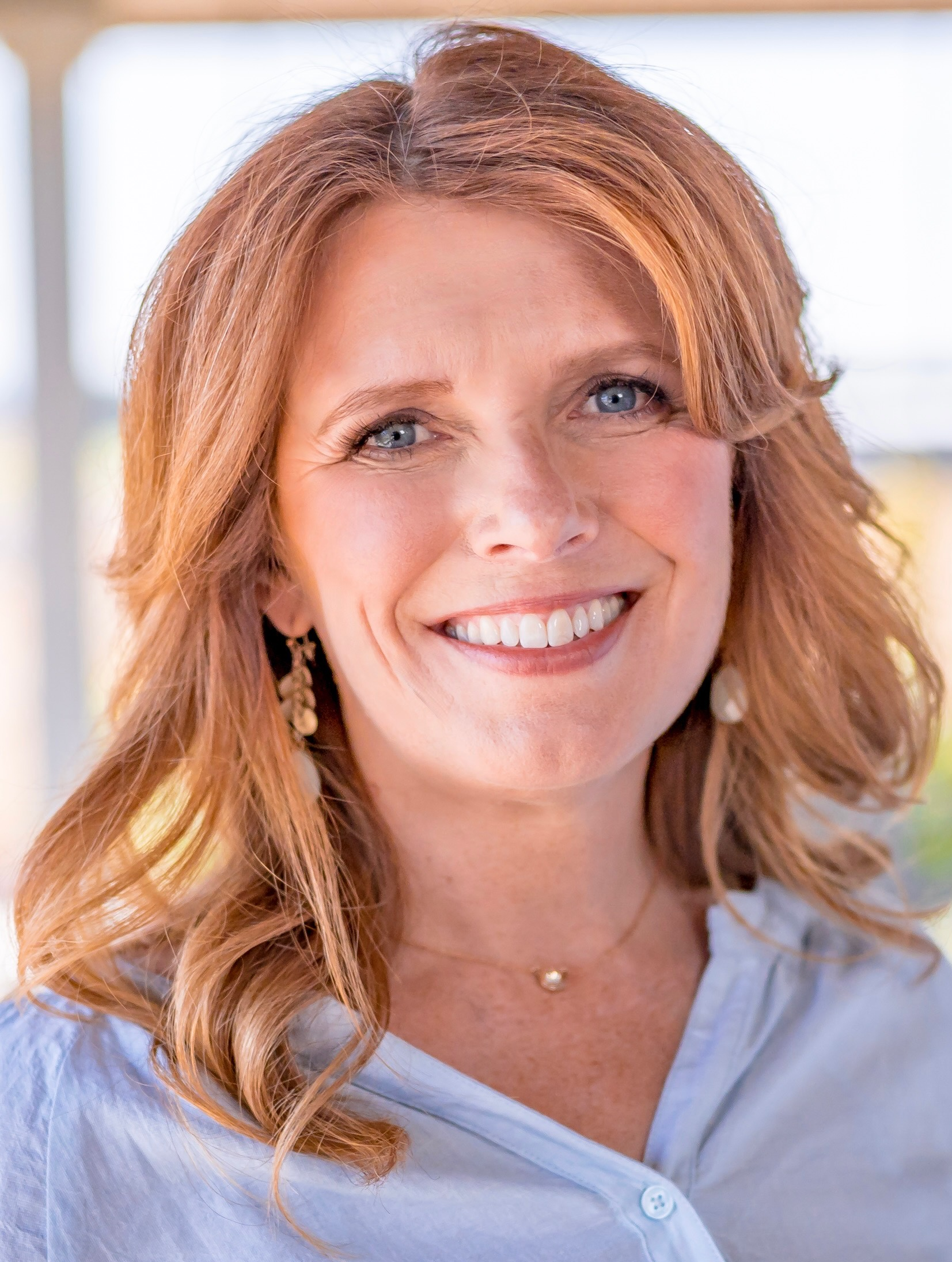

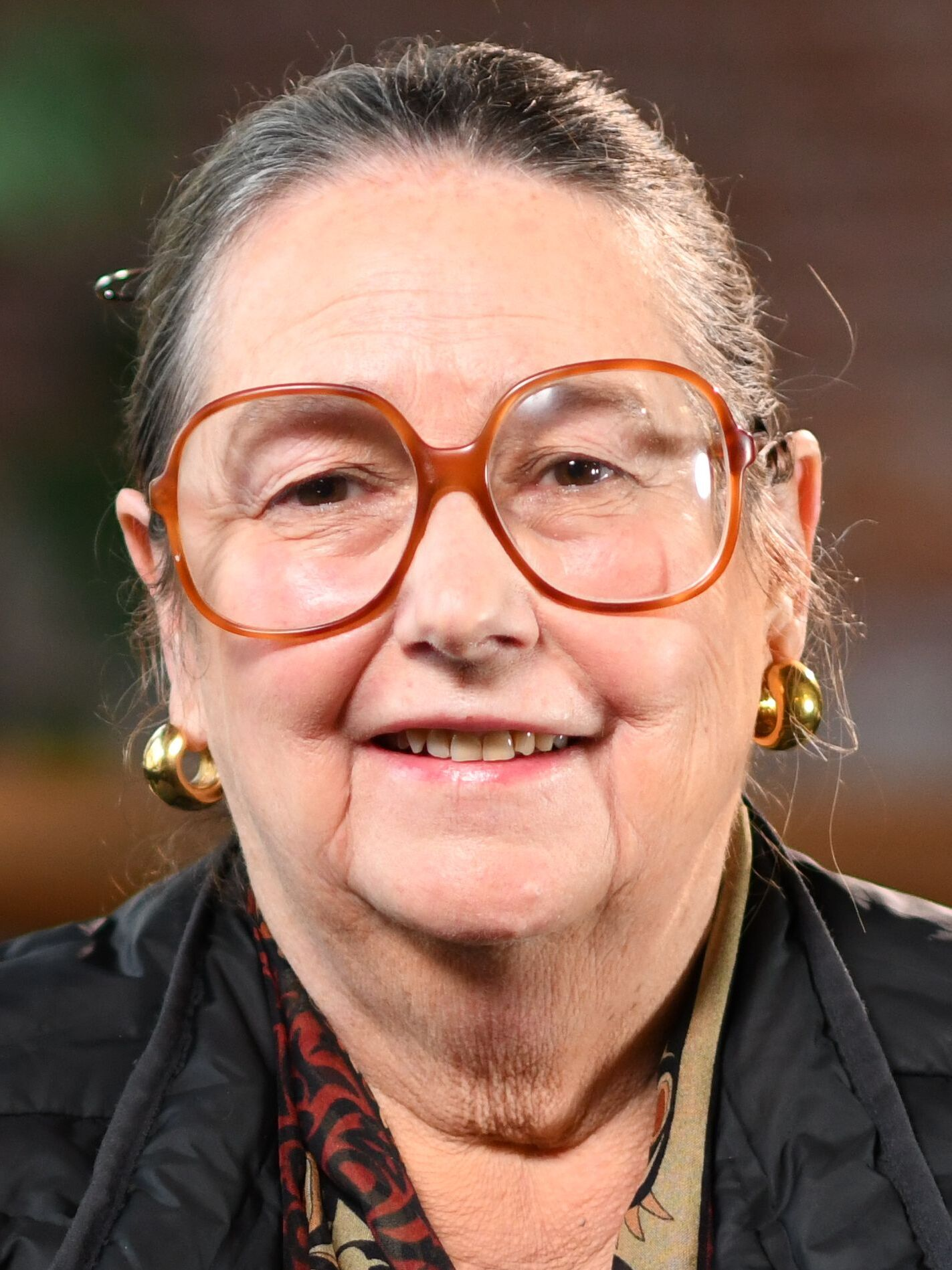
Nominee	Tina Kotek	Christine Drazan	Betsy Johnson
Party	Democratic	Republican	Independent
Alliance	Working Families
Popular vote	917,074	850,347	168,431
Percentage	46.96%	43.54%	8.62%
- Kotek: 30–40% 40–50% 50–60% 60–70% 70–80% 80–90% 90%+ Drazan: 30–40% 40–50% 50–60% 60–70% 70–80% 80–90% 90%+ Tie: 40–50% 50%
Governor before election
Kate Brown
Democratic
Elected Governor
Tina Kotek
Democratic

The 2022 Oregon gubernatorial election took place on November 8, 2022, to elect the governor of Oregon. Incumbent Kate Brown took office when fellow Democrat John Kitzhaber resigned on February 18, 2015. She won the subsequent 2016 special election and a full term in 2018. Due to term limits, she was unable to run again in 2022.

The Oregonian anticipated the election to have "the first competitive Democratic primary in more than a decade and potentially the closest such race since 2002." Willamette Week anticipated a "wide open field of Democrats", citing the lack of an incumbent. Almost 20 Republican Party candidates ran for the office, including two previous nominees for governor in 1998 and 2016, as well as 15 Democrats and some non-affiliates/third-party members. This was the state's first gubernatorial election since 2002 in which there was no current or former governor on the ballot.

In the May 17 primary elections, former Oregon House Speaker Tina Kotek was declared the winner of the Democratic primary half an hour after the ballot deadline. The next day, former House Minority Leader Christine Drazan was determined to have won the Republican primary. Notably, the general election featured three prominent female candidates, including former state senator Betsy Johnson, who was a moderate Democrat, running as an independent. This was also the first gubernatorial election in the United States to be between two women with the same first name (and the only one other than the rematch between the same two candidates in 2026), as Tina Kotek's first name is short for Christine.

Oregon was considered a possible Republican pickup, as Kate Brown had the lowest approval rating of any governor in the United States at the time and Johnson could have siphoned votes from Kotek. Nonetheless, Kotek narrowly won the election, becoming Oregon's 7th consecutive Democratic governor. Notably, none of Oregon's counties flipped parties from the 2018 or 2016 gubernatorial elections. Kotek became one of the first lesbian governors in the United States, along with Maura Healey, who was elected Governor of Massachusetts the same day.

== Democratic primary ==
=== Candidates ===
==== Nominee ====
- Tina Kotek, former speaker of the Oregon House of Representatives (2013–2022)

==== Eliminated in primary ====
- David Beem, former member of the Oregon Disabilities Commission
- Julian Bell, critical care and pulmonary medicine specialist and candidate for governor in 2016
- Wilson Bright, retired textile company operator
- George Carrillo, program manager at the Oregon Health Authority and Marine Corps veteran
- Michael Cross, software designer, commercial driver, and Republican nominee for Oregon attorney general in 2020
- Ifeanyichukwu Diru, farmer and candidate for governor in 2014
- Peter Hall, Haines city councilor and member of the Board of Directors of the League of Oregon Cities
- Keisha Merchant, artist and creative designer
- Tobias Read, Oregon state treasurer (endorsed Kotek in general election)
- Patrick Starnes, former Independent Party of Oregon candidate for governor (2018)
- David Stauffer, environmental inventor and perennial candidate
- John Sweeney, owner of Canary Castle Gallery
- Michael Trimble, cyclist and disability advocate
- Genevieve Wilson, independent contractor

==== Disqualified ====
- Nicholas Kristof, author and Pulitzer Prize-winning journalist at The New York Times (found to not meet residency requirements by the Secretary of State's office and Oregon Supreme Court; endorsed Kotek in general election)

==== Withdrew ====
- Casey Kulla, Yamhill County commissioner (running for labor commissioner)
- David Lavinsky, businessman
- Nico Pucci, Oregon Health Authority operations and policy analyst
- Peter Winter, non-profit project manager

==== Declined ====
- Rukaiyah Adams, chief investment officer of the Meyer Memorial Trust
- Julia Brim-Edwards, member of the Portland Public School Board
- Shemia Fagan, Oregon secretary of state
- Val Hoyle, Oregon labor commissioner (running for the U.S. House)
- Deborah Kafoury, chair of the Multnomah County Commission and former state representative from the 18th and 43rd districts (endorsed Kotek)
- Lynn Peterson, president of the Portland Metro Council (endorsed Kotek)
- Ellen Rosenblum, Oregon attorney general (endorsed Kotek in general election)
- Melissa Unger, executive director of Service Employees International Union Oregon chapter
- Ted Wheeler, mayor of Portland and former Oregon state treasurer

=== Debates ===
No.	Date	Host	Moderator	Link	Participants			
Key: P Participant N Non-invitee								
Key: P Participant N Non-invitee					George Carillo	Tina Kotek	Tobias Read	Patrick Starnes
1	Mar 18, 2022	Oregon AFL–CIO	Michelle Damis		N	P	P	N
2	Apr 22, 2022	City Club of Portland	Laural Porter; David Molko	Video	N	P	P	N
3	May 3, 2022	KOIN 6 News; Pamplin Media Group	Ken Boddie	Videos	P	P	P	P

=== Endorsements ===
Tina Kotek

U.S. senators

- Elizabeth Warren, U.S. senator from Massachusetts

Labor unions

- International Brotherhood of Electrical Workers Locals 48 and 280
- International Union of Painters and Allied Trades District Council 5
- Iron Workers District Council of the Pacific Northwest
- Oregon and Southern Idaho District Council of Laborers, LiUNA Locals 737 and 483
- Oregon Education Association
- Oregon Nurses Association
- Oregon State Building and Construction Trades Council
- Pineros y Campesinos Unidos del Noroeste
- United Association of Plumbers and Steamfitters Local 290

Political parties

- Working Families Party

Newspapers

- The Bulletin
- Eugene Weekly
- The Oregonian
- Pamplin Media Group (Portland Tribune)
- Portland Mercury
- The Source Weekly
- Willamette Week

Organizations

- Basic Rights Oregon
- EMILYs List
- End Citizens United/Let America Vote
- Giffords
- Human Rights Campaign
- LGBTQ Victory Fund
- LPAC
- Oregon League of Conservation Voters
- Planned Parenthood PAC of Oregon
- Safety & Justice Oregon
- Sierra Club Oregon Chapter
Tobias Read

State officials

- John Kitzhaber, former governor of Oregon (1995–2003 and 2011–2015)
- Barbara Roberts, former governor of Oregon (1991–1995)
Patrick Starnes

Political parties

- Oregon Progressive Party
Nicholas Kristof (disqualified)

Labor unions

- United Food and Commercial Workers Local 555

Individuals

- Piers Morgan, television personality

=== Polling ===
Poll source	Date(s) administered	Sample size (Note: Key: A – all adults RV – registered voters LV – likely voters V – unclear)	Margin of error	Tina Kotek	Tobias Read	Undecided
FM3 Research (D) (Note: Poll sponsored by Read's campaign)	April 7–11, 2022	653 (LV)	± 3.8%	25%	20%	56%

=== Results ===
Results by county Kotek: 30–40%; 40–50%; 50–60%; 60–70%; Read: 30–40%; 40–50%

Democratic primary results
Party	Candidate	Votes	%
Democratic	Tina Kotek	275,301	57.63%
Democratic	Tobias Read	156,017	32.66%
Democratic	Patrick Starnes	10,524	2.20%
Democratic	George Carrillo	9,365	1.96%
Democratic	Michael Trimble	5,000	1.05%
Democratic	John Sweeney	4,193	0.88%
Democratic	Julian Bell	3,926	0.82%
Democratic	Wilson Bright	2,316	0.48%
Democratic	Dave Stauffer	2,302	0.48%
Democratic	Ifeanyichukwu Diru	1,780	0.37%
Democratic	Keisha Marchant	1,755	0.37%
Democratic	Genevieve Wilson	1,588	0.33%
Democratic	Michael Cross	1,342	0.28%
Democratic	David Beem	1,308	0.27%
Democratic	Peter Hall	982	0.21%
Total votes		477,699	100.0%

== Republican primary ==
=== Candidates ===
==== Nominee ====
- Christine Drazan, former minority leader of the Oregon House of Representatives (2019–2021) and state representative from the 39th district (2019–2022)

==== Eliminated in primary ====
- Raymond Baldwin, general contractor
- Bridget Barton, political consultant for Third Century Solutions (endorsed Johnson in general election)
- Court Boice, Curry County chair (endorsed Drazan in general election)
- David Burch
- Jessica Gomez, member of the Business Oregon Commission and Oregon Institute of Technology Board of Trustees
- Nick Hess, CEO and entrepreneur
- Tim McCloud, business development analyst
- Kerry McQuisten, mayor of Baker City
- Brandon Merritt, business development manager
- Bud Pierce, oncologist and nominee for governor in 2016 (endorsed Drazan in general election)
- John Presco, president of Royal Rosamond Press
- Stan Pulliam, mayor of Sandy (endorsed Drazan in general election)
- Amber Richardson, chiropractor
- Bill Sizemore, general contractor, tax-reduction advocate, candidate for governor in 2010, and nominee in 1998
- Stefan Galen Strek, painter and graphic design artist
- Marc Thielman, former Alsea School District superintendent
- Bob Tiernan, former state representative from the 24th district (1993–1997) and former chair of the Oregon Republican Party (2009–2011)

==== Withdrew ====
- Angelique Bouvier, psychologist and business owner
- Reed Christensen, former electrical engineer
- Mark Duncan, fight instructor
- John L. Fosdick III, customer service representative, Army veteran
- Darin Harbick, businessman (running for U.S. Senate)
- Jim Huggins, film producer, businessman and Air Force veteran (endorsed McQuisten)
- Alexander Males, polyurethane manufacturing worker
- Monte Sauer Jr., CEO of AmericaProud

==== Declined ====
- Knute Buehler, former state representative from the 54th district (2015–2019), nominee for Secretary of State in 2012, and nominee for governor in 2018 (endorsed Johnson)
- Dallas Heard, state senator from the 1st district and former chair of the Oregon Republican Party (endorsed Drazan in general election)
- Tim Knopp, minority leader of the Oregon Senate from the 27th district
- Dennis Linthicum, state senator from the 28th district (endorsed Drazan in general election)
- Julie Parrish, former state representative from the 37th district (2011–2019)
- Bill Post, former state representative from the 25th district (2015–2021) (ineligible due to out-of-state residency)
- Tootie Smith, Clackamas County chair and former state representative from the 18th and 28th districts (2001–2003) (endorsed Drazan in general election)

=== Debates ===
No.	Date	Host	Moderator	Link	Participants																
Key: P Participant A Absent N Non-invitee																					
Key: P Participant A Absent N Non-invitee					Barton	Boice	Burch	Christensen	Drazan	Gomez	Hess	McCloud	McQuisten	Merritt	Pierce	Pulliam	Richardson	Sizemore	Strek	Thielman	Tiernan
1	Apr 7, 2022	Timber Unity	Denise Quinn; Hunter Newton		P	P	N	A	P	P	A	P	A	P	P	P	N	P	P	P	P
2	Apr 21, 2022	Central Oregon Daily; The Bulletin	Allen Schauffler; Jerry O'Brien	Video	N	N	N	N	P	N	N	N	N	N	P	P	N	N	N	N	P
3	Apr 22, 2022	Linn County Republican Party	Adam Keaton	Video	P	N	P	N	A	N	P	P	P	P	N	N	P	P	N	P	A
4	Apr 28, 2022	KOIN 6 News; Pamplin Media Group	Jeff Gianola	Videos	N	N	N	N	P	N	N	N	N	N	P	P	N	N	N	N	P
5	May 3, 2022	City Club of Portland	Laural Porter; David Molko	Video	P	N	N	N	A	P	N	N	N	N	P	P	N	N	N	N	N

=== Endorsements ===
Bridget Barton

Organizations

- Oregon Right to Life PAC (co-endorsed with Tiernan, Drazan, and Pierce)

Individuals

- Lars Larson, conservative talk radio host
Christine Drazan

Newspapers

- The Bulletin
- The Oregonian
- Willamette Week

Organizations

- Oregon Right to Life PAC (co-endorsed with Tiernan, Barton, and Pierce)
Jessica Gomez

State officials

- Bev Clarno, former Oregon secretary of state (2019–2021) (co-endorsed with Johnson)

Newspapers

- The Source Weekly
Bud Pierce

Newspapers

- Pamplin Media Group (Portland Tribune)
Bob Tiernan

Organizations

- Oregon Right to Life PAC (co-endorsed with Barton, Drazan, and Pierce)

=== Polling ===
Poll source	Date(s) administered	Sample size	Margin of error	Bridget Barton	Christine Drazan	Jessica Gomez	Kerry McQuisten	Bud Pierce	Stan Pulliam	Bill Sizemore	Marc Thielman	Bob Tiernan	Other	Undecided
Nelson Research (R)	Apr 29 – May 2, 2022	514 (LV)	± 4.3%	3%	19%	2%	6%	10%	7%	4%	6%	14%	3% (Note: Boice, Hess, and Merritt with 1%; Christensen and McCloud with <1%)	27%
Nelson Research (R)	Apr 11–13, 2022	520 (LV)	± 4.3%	2%	8%	4%	3%	11%	5%	5%	4%	5%	5% (Note: Merritt with 2%; Richardson and Romero with 1%; Hess with <1%)	48%
Fallon Research & Communications (R) (Note: Poll sponsored by John von Schlegell while considering a Republican primary run for governor)	Early Nov 2021	600 (LV)	± 4.0%	–	2%	2%	–	14%	–	–	–	–	15% (Note: Other with 12%, Heard with 3%)	67%

=== Results ===
Results by county Drazan: 10–20%; 20–30%; 30–40%; Tiernan: 10–20%; 20–30%; Pierce: 20–30%; McQuisten: 10–20%; 30–40%; 40–50%

Republican primary results
Party	Candidate	Votes	%
Republican	Christine Drazan	85,255	22.99%
Republican	Bob Tiernan	66,089	17.82%
Republican	Stan Pulliam	41,123	11.09%
Republican	Bridget Barton	40,886	11.02%
Republican	Bud Pierce	32,965	8.89%
Republican	Marc Thielman	30,076	8.12%
Republican	Kerry McQuisten	28,727	7.74%
Republican	Bill Sizemore	13,261	3.57%
Republican	Jessica Gomez	9,970	2.69%
Republican	Tim McCloud	4,400	1.19%
Republican	Nick Hess	4,287	1.15%
Republican	Court Boice	4,040	1.09%
Republican	Brandon Merritt	3,615	0.97%
Republican	Reed Christensen	3,042	0.82%
Republican	Amber Richardson	1,924	0.52%
Republican	Raymond Baldwin	459	0.12%
Republican	David Burch	406	0.11%
Republican	John Presco	174	0.05%
Republican	Stefan Strek	171	0.05%
Total votes		370,910	100.0%

== Independents and other parties ==
=== Candidates ===
==== Candidates for general election ====
- Betsy Johnson, former Democratic state senator from Oregon's 16th Senate district (non-affiliated)
- R. Leon Noble (Libertarian Party)
- Donice Noelle Smith, Army veteran and talk show host (Constitution Party)

==== Withdrew ====
- Nathalie Paravicini, naturopathic doctor (Pacific Green Party and Oregon Progressive Party) (endorsed Kotek)

==== Failed to qualify for general election ====
In order to be listed as candidates on the general election ballot, non-affiliated candidates for governor needed to collect 23,744 signatures from Oregon voters (1% of votes cast for president in the 2020 election).

- Tim Harrold, security expert (non-affiliated)
- Dustin Watkins, dishwasher (non-affiliated)

==== Not nominated ====
- Kevin Levy, real estate broker (Independent Party)
- Paul Romero, refrigeration repair technician, Republican candidate for Oregon's 2nd congressional district in 2016 and 2018, and Republican candidate for U.S. Senate in 2020 (Constitution Party)

== General election ==
=== Predictions ===
Source	Ranking	As of
The Cook Political Report	Tossup	September 16, 2022
Inside Elections	Tossup	October 7, 2022
Sabato's Crystal Ball	Lean D	November 7, 2022
Politico	Tossup	October 3, 2022
RCP	Tossup	November 1, 2022
Fox News	Tossup	September 20, 2022
538	Lean D	November 8, 2022
Elections Daily	Lean D	November 7, 2022

=== Debates ===
No.	Date	Host	Moderator	Link	Democratic	Republican	Independent
Key: P Participant							
Key: P Participant					Tina Kotek	Christine Drazan	Betsy Johnson
1	July 29, 2022	Oregon Newspaper Publishers Association	Mark Garber	Video	P	P	P
2	Sept. 27, 2022	Oregon State University–Cascades; KTVZ; City Club of Central Oregon	Cathy Marshall	Video (Part 1); Video (Part 2)	P	P	P
3	Oct. 4, 2022	KATU	Steve Dunn	Video	P	P	P
4	Oct. 6, 2022	KOBI; Southern Oregon University	Craig Smullin	Video	P	P	P
5	Oct 19, 2022	The Oregonian; KGW	Laurel Porter; Hillary Borrud	Video	P	P	P

=== Post-primary endorsements ===
Tina Kotek (D)

U.S. executive branch officials

- Joe Biden, 46th president of the United States (2021–2025)
- Barack Obama, 44th president of the United States (2009–2017)

U.S. senators

- Jeff Merkley, U.S. senator from Oregon
- Bernie Sanders, U.S. senator from Vermont
- Ron Wyden, U.S. senator from Oregon

U.S. representatives

- Earl Blumenauer, U.S. representative from Oregon's 3rd congressional district
- Suzanne Bonamici, U.S. representative from Oregon's 1st congressional district

State officials

- Kate Brown, governor of Oregon and former Oregon secretary of state
- Tobias Read, Oregon state treasurer and 2022 governor candidate

State legislators

- Wlnsvey Campos, state representative from the 28th district
- Michael Dembrow, state senator from the 23rd district and former state representative from the 45th district
- Maxine Dexter, state representative from the 33rd district
- Jeff Golden, state senator from the 3rd district
- Dacia Grayber, state representative from the 35th district
- Kayse Jama, state senator from the 24th district
- Rob Nosse, state representative from the 42nd district
- Khanh Pham, state representative from the 46th district
- Andrea Valderrama, state representative from the 47th district

Native American tribes

- Confederated Tribes of Grand Ronde

Labor unions

- Oregon AFL-CIO
- Oregon AFSCME

Political parties

- Working Families Party

Newspapers

- The Astorian
- The Skanner

Organizations

- Everytown for Gun Safety
- Pro-Choice Oregon
- Stand for Children Oregon

Individuals

- Nicholas Kristof, former New York Times journalist and disqualified 2022 governor candidate
- Nathalie Paravicini, former 2022 Pacific Green Party and Oregon Progressive Party governor candidate
- Cecile Richards, former president of Planned Parenthood
- Liz Shuler, president of the AFL–CIO
- Christina Stephenson, civil rights attorney and candidate for labor commissioner

Musicians

- The Decemberists
- Portugal. The Man
Christine Drazan (R)

U.S. representatives

- Cliff Bentz, U.S. representative from Oregon's 2nd congressional district (2021–present)

State officials

- Chris Christie, former governor of New Jersey (2010–2018)
- Larry Hogan, governor of Maryland
- Glenn Youngkin, governor of Virginia

State legislators

- Daniel Bonham, state representative from the 59th district (2017–present)
- Vikki Breese-Iverson, minority leader of the Oregon House of Representatives (2021–present) and state representative from the 55th district (2019–present)
- Neil Bryant, former state senator from the 27th district (1993–2001)
- Shelly Boshart Davis, state representative from the 15th district (2019–present)
- Jessica George, state representative from the 25th district (2021–present)
- Christine Goodwin, state representative from the 2nd district (2021–present)
- Cedric Hayden, state representative from the 7th district (2015–present)
- Dallas Heard, state senator from the 1st district (2018–present) and former state representative from the 2nd district (2015–2018) and chair of the Oregon Republican Party (2021–2022)
- James Hieb, state representative from the 39th district (2022–present)
- Bill Kennemer, state senator from the 20th district (2021–present) and 12th district (1987–1997) and former state representative from the 39th district (2009–2019)
- Tim Knopp, minority leader of the Oregon Senate (2021–present) and state senator from 27th district (2013–present)
- Bobby Levy, state representative from the 58th district (2021–present)
- Rick Lewis, state representative from the 18th district (2017–present) and former mayor of Silverton (2015–2017)
- Dennis Linthicum, state senator from the 28th district (2017–present) and former Klamath County commissioner (2009–2015)
- Raquel Moore-Green, state representative from the 19th district (2019–present)
- Lily Morgan, state representative from the 3rd district (2021–present)
- Ron Noble, state representative from the 24th district (2017–present)
- Mark Owens, state representative from the 60th district (2020–present)
- E. Werner Reschke, state representative from the 56th district (2017–present)
- Anna Scharf, state representative from the 23rd district (2021–present)
- Wayne Scott, former minority leader of the Oregon House of Representatives (2007–2009) and state representative from the 39th district (2003–2009)
- Mark Simmons, former speaker of the Oregon House of Representatives (2001–2003) and state representative from the 58th district (1997–2003)
- David Brock Smith, state representative from the 1st district (2017–present)
- Greg Smith, state representative from the 57th district (2003–present) and 59th district (2001–2003)
- Duane Stark, state representative from the 4th district (2015–present)
- Kim Thatcher, state senator from the 13th district (2015–present) and former state representative from the 25th district (2005–2015)
- Kim Wallan, minority whip of the Oregon House of Representatives (2019–present) and state representative from the 6th district (2019–present)
- Boomer Wright, state representative from the 9th district (2021–present)
- Jack Zika, state representative from the 53rd district (2019–present)

Local officials

- Kevin Cameron, Marion County commissioner (2014–present) and former state representative from the 19th district (2005–2014)
- Tim Freeman, Douglas County commissioner (2015–present) and former state representative from the 2nd district (2009–2015)
- Stan Pulliam, mayor of Sandy and 2022 governor candidate
- Sherrie Sprenger, Linn County commissioner (2021–present) and former state representative from the 17th district (2008–2021)

Organizations

- National Federation of Independent Business Oregon
- Oregon Association of Realtors
- Oregon Chiefs of Police Association (co-endorsed with Johnson)
- Oregon Coalition of Police & Sheriffs (co-endorsed with Johnson)
- Oregon Farm Bureau
- Oregon State Sheriffs’ Association (co-endorsed with Johnson)
- Republican Governors Association
- Right Direction Women
- Timber Unity

Individuals

- Lars Larson, conservative talk radio host
- Bud Pierce, oncologist, nominee for governor in 2016 and candidate in 2022
Betsy Johnson (I)

U.S. executive branch officials

- Billy J. Williams, former U.S. attorney for the District of Oregon (2015–2021) (Independent)

U.S. senators

- Gordon Smith, former U.S. senator from Oregon (1997–2009) (Republican)

U.S. representatives

- Darlene Hooley, former U.S. representative from Oregon's 5th congressional district (Democratic)
- Kurt Schrader, U.S. representative from Oregon's 5th congressional district (Democratic)

State officials

- Bev Clarno, former Oregon secretary of state (2019–2021) (Republican)
- Ted Kulongoski, former governor of Oregon (2003–2011) (Democratic)
- Jack Roberts, former Oregon labor commissioner (1995–2003) (Republican)

State legislators

- Herman Baertschiger, Josephine County commissioner, and former chair of the Oregon Republican Party and minority leader of the Oregon state Senate (Republican)
- Lee Beyer, state senator from the 6th district (Democratic)
- Brian Boquist, state senator from the 12th district (Independent Party of Oregon)
- Knute Buehler, former state representative from the 54th district (2015–2019), Republican nominee for Secretary of State in 2012, and Republican nominee for governor in 2018 (Independent)
- Larry Campbell, former speaker of the Oregon House of Representatives (1991–1995) (Republican)
- Margaret Carter, former president pro tempore of the Oregon state Senate (2005–2009) and former chair of the Oregon Democratic Party (Democratic)
- Sal Esquivel, former state senator from the 3rd district (2004–2005) and state representative from the 6th district (2005–2019) (Republican)
- Phil Lang, former speaker of the Oregon House of Representatives (1975–1978) (Democratic)
- Frank Morse, former state senator from the 8th district (2003–2012) (Republican)
- Mike Nearman, former state representative from the 23rd district (2015–2021) (Republican; rejected by Johnson)
- Andy Olson, former speaker pro tempore of the Oregon House of Representatives (Republican)

Labor unions

- Oregon Machinists Council

Newspapers

- The Bulletin
- News-Register
- Pamplin Media Group (Portland Tribune)

Organizations

- Crime Victims United of Oregon
- Eugene Police Employees’ Association
- Fraternal Order of Police Oregon Lodge
- Oregon Chiefs of Police Association (co-endorsed with Drazan)
- Oregon Coalition of Police & Sheriffs (co-endorsed with Drazan)
- Oregon State Sheriffs' Association (co-endorsed with Drazan)
- Tigard Chamber of Commerce

Individuals

- Bridget Barton, political consultant for Third Century Solutions and Republican 2022 governor candidate (Republican)
- Tim Boyle, CEO of Columbia Sportswear (Democratic)
- Gerry Frank, former chief of staff to U.S. Senator Mark Hatfield and Oregon travel author (deceased; Republican)
- Thomas Lauderdale, pianist of Pink Martini (Democratic)
- Andrew Yang, businessman, and Democratic candidate for the 2020 presidential election and the 2021 New York City mayoral election (Independent, Forward)

=== Polling ===
Aggregate polls

Source of poll aggregation	Dates administered	Dates updated	Tina Kotek (D)	Christine Drazan (R)	Betsy Johnson (I)	Other (Note: Calculated by taking the difference of 100% and all other candidates combined.)	Margin
Real Clear Politics	October 17 – November 6, 2022	November 7, 2022	42.3%	41.0%	11.5%	5.2%	Kotek +1.3
FiveThirtyEight	June 29 – November 6, 2022	November 7, 2022	44.9%	41.9%	8.4%	4.8%	Kotek +3
270toWin	October 26 – November 7, 2022	November 7, 2022	43.6%	42.2%	8.6%	5.6%	Kotek +1.4
Average			43.6%	42.0%	9.5%	4.9%	Kotek +1.6

View source data.

Poll source	Date(s) administered	Sample size	Margin of error	Tina Kotek (D)	Christine Drazan (R)	Betsy Johnson (I)	Other	Undecided
Data for Progress (D)	November 1–6, 2022	1,393 (LV)	± 3.0%	48%	44%	7%	1% (Note: Noble with 1%; Smith and Romero with 0%)	–
Emerson College	October 31 – November 1, 2022	975 (LV)	± 3.1%	44%	40%	8%	1% (Note: Smith (C) with 1%; Noble (L); "Someone else" with <1%)	6%
Emerson College	October 31 – November 1, 2022	975 (LV)	± 3.1%	46%	41%	9%	4% (Note: Smith (C) with 1%; Noble (L) with <1%; "Someone else" with 3%)	–
Nelson Research	October 31 – November 1, 2022	577 (LV)	± 4.1%	43%	45%	6%	1% (Note: Noble with 1%; Smith with <1%)	5%
Blueprint Polling (D)	October 26 – November 1, 2022	585 (LV)	± 4.0%	45%	41%	10%	<1% (Note: Smith (C) with <1%)	4%
FM3 Research (D) (Note: Poll sponsored by Kotek's campaign)	October 24–26, 2022	741 (LV)	± 4.0%	40%	38%	13%	–	8%
The Trafalgar Group (R)	October 18–22, 2022	1,161 (LV)	± 2.9%	40%	42%	13%	1%	4%
Hoffman Research Group (R)	October 17–18, 2022	684 (LV)	± 3.8%	35%	37%	17%	–	12%
Data for Progress (D)	October 16–18, 2022	1,021 (LV)	± 3.0%	42%	43%	12%	–	2%
Civiqs	October 15–18, 2022	804 (LV)	± 4.3%	47%	39%	7%	2% (Note: "Someone else" with 2%)	5%
GBAO (D)	October 10–13, 2022	800 (LV)	± 3.5%	40%	38%	14%	–	8%
Clout Research (R)	October 8–9, 2022	842 (LV)	± 3.4%	38%	44%	11%	1%	5%
Emerson College	September 29 – October 1, 2022	796 (LV)	± 3.4%	34%	36%	19%	2%	9%
Clout Research (R)	September 23–26, 2022	422 (LV)	± 4.8%	35%	39%	16%	2%	8%
DHM Research	September 23–24, 2022	600 (LV)	± 4.0%	31%	32%	18%	4% (Note: Noble (L) with 3%; Smith (C) with 1%)	15%
DHM Research	September 23–24, 2022	600 (LV)	± 4.0%	33%	35%	21%	–	12%
Nelson Research (Note: Poll sponsored by Associated General Contractors Oregon-Columbia Chapter, which donated $100,000 to both Drazan and Johnson)	September 19–20, 2022	620 (LV)	± 3.9%	32%	33%	19%	–	16%
Clout Research (R)	August 10–14, 2022	397 (LV)	± 4.9%	32%	33%	21%	–	15%
Cygnal (R) (Note: Poll sponsored by the Oregon State Senate Republican Caucus, which supported Drazan)	June 28–30, 2022	600 (LV)	± 3.9%	31%	32%	24%	–	13%
GS Strategy Group (I) (Note: Poll sponsored by Johnson's campaign (GS Strategy Group typically works with Republican clients, not to be confused with Democratic pollster Global Strategy Group))	June 23–29, 2022	600 (LV)	± 4.0%	33%	23%	30%	–	15%
Nelson Research (R)	May 25–27, 2022	516 (LV)	± 4.3%	28%	30%	19%	–	24%
GS Strategy Group (I)	May 2022	– (LV)	–	34%	24%	22%	–	20%
GS Strategy Group (I)	March 2022	– (LV)	–	23%	18%	19%	–	41%

Hypothetical polling

Tina Kotek vs. Christine Drazan

Poll source	Date(s) administered	Sample size	Margin of error	Tina Kotek (D)	Christine Drazan (R)	Undecided
Clout Research (R)	September 23–26, 2022	422 (LV)	± 4.8%	47%	53%	–

Generic Democrat vs. generic Republican vs. Betsy Johnson

Poll source	Date(s) administered	Sample size	Margin of error	Generic Democrat	Generic Republican	Betsy Johnson (I)	Undecided
DHM Research	January 18–22, 2022	400 (A)	± 4.9%	31%	22%	11%	36%

Generic Democrat vs. generic Republican

Poll source	Date(s) administered	Sample size	Margin of error	Generic Democrat	Generic Republican	Undecided
Clout Research (R)	September 23–26, 2022	422 (LV)	± 4.8%	50%	50%	–
DHM Research	February 17–23, 2022	600 (RV)	± 4.0%	29%	47%	23%
DHM Research	January 18–22, 2022	400 (A)	± 4.9%	40%	31%	29%

Generic Democrat vs. generic Republican vs. generic independent

Poll source	Date(s) administered	Sample size	Margin of error	Generic Democrat	Generic Republican	Generic Independent	Undecided
DHM Research	February 17–23, 2022	600 (RV)	± 4.0%	16%	26%	21%	37%

=== Results ===
2022 Oregon gubernatorial election
Party	Candidate	Votes	%	±%
Democratic	Tina Kotek	917,074	46.96%	−3.09%
Republican	Christine Drazan	850,347	43.54%	−0.11%
Independent	Betsy Johnson	168,431	8.62%	N/A
Constitution	Donice Noelle Smith	8,051	0.41%	−0.72%
Libertarian	R. Leon Noble	6,867	0.35%	−1.20%
Write-in		2,113	0.11%	-0.05%
Total votes		1,952,883	100.00%	N/A
Democratic hold				

==== By county ====
County	Tina Kotek Democratic		Christine Drazan Republican		Betsy Johnson Independent		Various candidates Other parties		Margin		Total votes
County	#	%	#	%	#	%	#	%	#	%	Total votes
Baker	1,483	16.95	6,328	72.31	831	9.50	109	1.25	-4,845	-55.37	8,751
Benton	27,128	59.86	14,658	32.34	3,183	7.02	350	0.77	12,470	27.52	45,319
Clackamas	92,274	42.94	102,111	47.52	19,195	8.93	1,309	0.61	-9,837	-4.58	214,889
Clatsop	8,051	39.85	7,375	36.51	4,624	22.89	151	0.75	676	3.35	20,201
Columbia	8,036	29.35	13,420	49.01	5,702	20.82	226	0.83	-5,384	-19.66	27,384
Coos	9,437	30.03	18,611	59.22	2,924	9.30	457	1.45	-9,174	-29.19	31,429
Crook	2,209	15.71	10,362	73.67	1,361	9.68	133	0.95	-8,153	-57.97	14,065
Curry	4,143	32.68	7,272	57.35	1,116	8.80	148	1.17	-3,129	-24.68	12,679
Deschutes	46,879	42.74	50,513	46.06	11,502	10.49	784	0.71	-3,634	-3.31	109,678
Douglas	12,013	22.02	37,245	68.27	4,492	8.23	803	1.47	-25,232	-46.25	54,553
Gilliam	147	14.71	636	63.66	204	20.42	12	1.20	-432	-43.24 (Note: In Gilliam County, where Kotek placed behind Johnson, the margin of difference is the Drazan vote minus the Johnson vote.)	999
Grant	576	13.81	3,145	75.42	383	9.18	66	1.58	-2,569	-61.61	4,170
Harney	485	12.65	2,973	77.54	322	8.40	54	1.41	-2,488	-64.89	3,834
Hood River	6,040	55.90	3,633	33.62	1,035	9.58	97	0.90	2,407	22.28	10,805
Jackson	39,611	37.95	56,362	53.99	7,320	7.01	1,092	1.05	-16,751	-16.05	104,385
Jefferson	2,376	23.81	6,251	62.65	1,212	12.15	138	1.38	-3,875	-38.84	9,977
Josephine	11,610	27.02	27,578	64.19	3,245	7.55	529	1.23	-15,968	-37.17	42,962
Klamath	5,968	19.75	21,962	72.68	1,863	6.17	424	1.40	-15,994	-52.93	30,217
Lake	430	10.73	3,282	81.89	237	5.91	59	1.47	-2,852	-71.16	4,008
Lane	95,847	52.18	72,087	39.25	13,911	7.57	1,824	0.99	23,760	12.94	183,669
Lincoln	12,947	49.28	10,366	39.46	2,649	10.08	308	1.17	2,581	9.82	26,270
Linn	16,959	27.58	38,505	62.61	5,264	8.56	767	1.25	-21,546	-35.04	61,495
Malheur	1,656	18.03	6,921	75.33	471	5.13	139	1.51	-5,265	-57.31	9,187
Marion	51,238	38.00	70,741	52.46	11,533	8.55	1,338	0.99	-19,503	-14.46	134,850
Morrow	607	14.84	3,016	73.76	389	9.51	77	1.88	-2,409	-58.91	4,089
Multnomah	265,805	72.62	72,158	19.71	26,079	7.12	2,001	0.55	193,647	52.90	366,043
Polk	15,570	37.51	21,898	52.75	3,606	8.69	436	1.05	-6,328	-15.24	41,510
Sherman	122	11.80	795	76.89	108	10.44	9	0.87	-673	-65.09	1,034
Tillamook	5,266	36.04	6,631	45.38	2,600	17.79	114	0.78	-1,365	-9.34	14,611
Umatilla	5,403	21.50	17,672	70.32	1,666	6.63	391	1.56	-12,269	-48.82	25,132
Union	2,580	20.57	8,695	69.32	1,127	8.98	142	1.13	-6,115	-48.75	12,544
Wallowa	1,116	24.28	3,138	68.26	291	6.33	52	1.13	-2,022	-43.99	4,597
Wasco	4,077	35.74	5,978	52.41	1,240	10.87	112	0.98	-1,901	-16.67	11,407
Washington	140,946	55.08	91,068	35.59	22,024	8.61	1,844	0.72	49,878	19.49	255,882
Wheeler	140	16.87	576	69.40	96	11.57	18	2.17	-436	-52.53	830
Yamhill	17,899	36.21	26,385	53.38	4,626	9.36	518	1.05	-8,486	-17.17	49,428
Totals	917,074	46.96	850,347	43.54	168,431	8.62	17,031	0.87	66,727	3.42	1,952,883

==== By congressional district ====
Kotek won three of six congressional districts, with the remaining three going to Drazan, including one that elected a Democrat.

District	Kotek	Drazan	Representative
1st	57%	31%	Suzanne Bonamici
2nd	27%	64%	Cliff Bentz
3rd	65%	27%	Earl Blumenauer
4th	46%	44%	Peter DeFazio (117th Congress)
4th	46%	44%	Val Hoyle (118th Congress)
5th	43%	48%	Kurt Schrader (117th Congress)
5th	43%	48%	Lori Chavez-DeRemer (118th Congress)
6th	44%	46%	Andrea Salinas

== See also ==
- 2022 Oregon elections
- 2022 United States gubernatorial elections

== Notes ==
Partisan clients
