= 2012 Oregon Secretary of State election =

- November 6, 2012
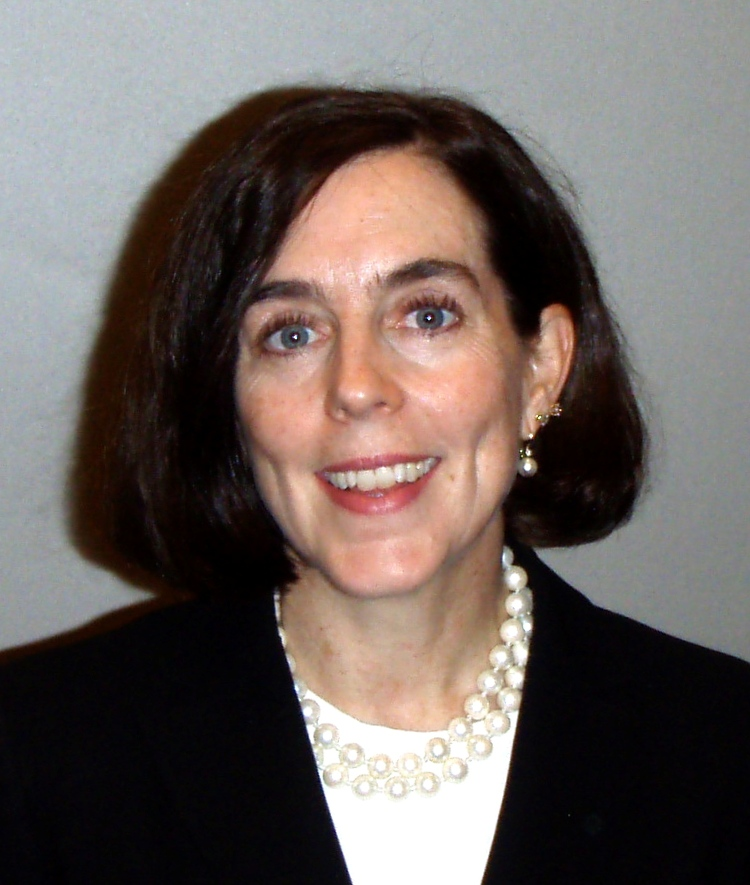

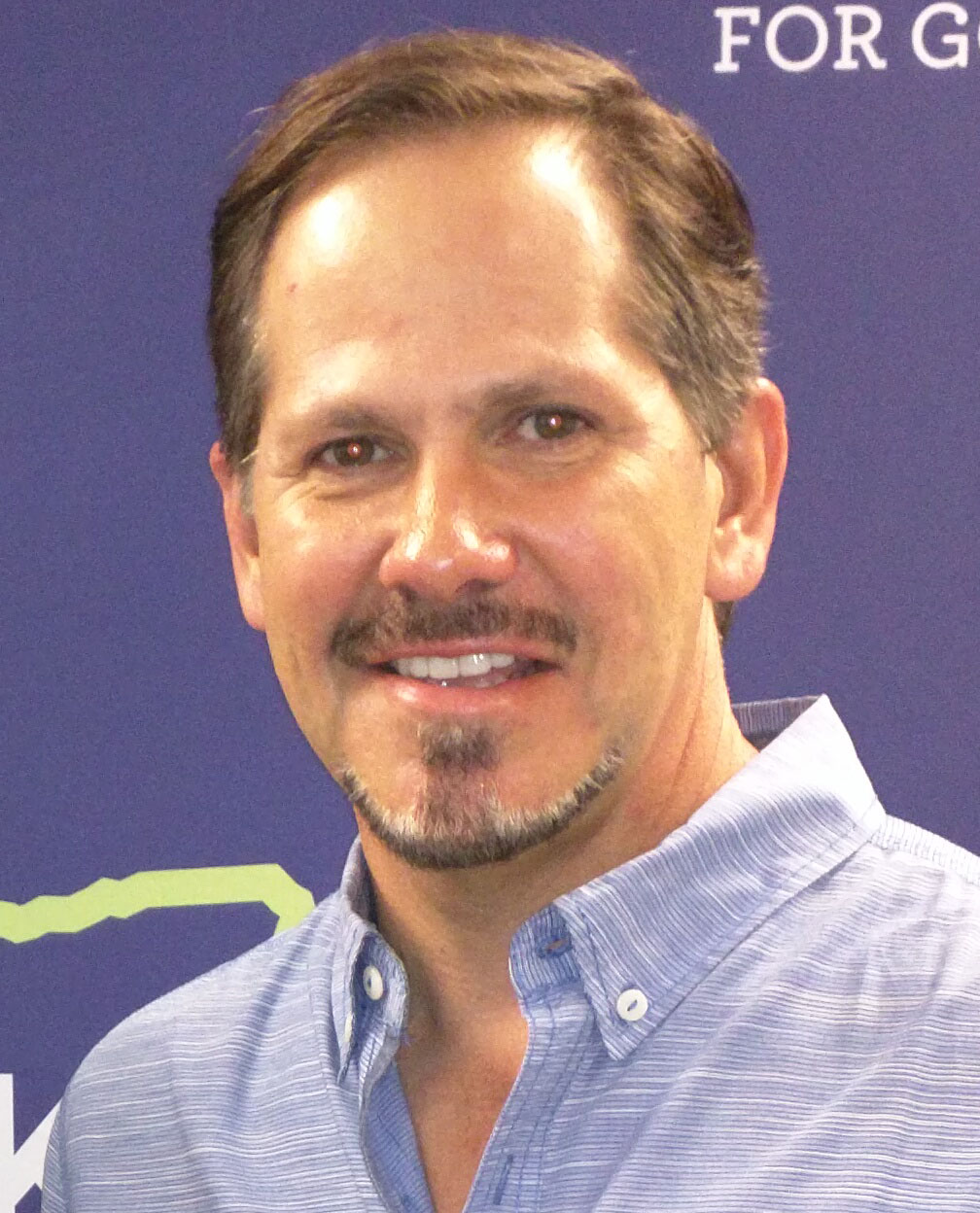
| Nominee | Kate Brown | Knute Buehler |
| Party | Democratic | Republican |
| Popular vote | 863,656 | 727,607 |
| Percentage | 51.28% | 43.20% |
- Brown: 40–50% 50–60% 60–70% Buehler: 40–50% 50–60% 60–70% 70–80%
Secretary of State before election
Kate Brown
Democratic
Elected Secretary of State
Kate Brown
Democratic

The 2012 Oregon Secretary of State election was held on November 6, 2012, to elect the Oregon Secretary of State. Incumbent Democratic Secretary of State Kate Brown ran for a second term against Republican Knute Buehler. Brown and Buehler ran against each other again in the 2018 Oregon gubernatorial election.

== Democratic primary ==
=== Candidates ===
- Kate Brown, incumbent
- Paul Damian Wells, machinist

=== Results ===
Democratic Primary results
| Party | Candidate | Votes | % |
|---|---|---|---|
| Democratic | Kate Brown | 284,470 | 91.1 |
| Democratic | Paul Damian Wells | 26,177 | 8.4 |
| Democratic | write-ins | 1,510 | 0.5 |
| Total votes | | 312,157 | 100 |

== Republican primary ==
=== Candidates ===
- Knute Buehler, surgeon

=== Results ===
Republican Primary results
| Party | Candidate | Votes | % |
|---|---|---|---|
| Republican | Knute Buehler | 199,179 | 97.76 |
| Republican | write-ins | 4,558 | 2.24 |
| Total votes | | 203,737 | 100 |

== Independent primary ==
Oregon allows candidates to be cross-nominated by up to three political parties. The Independent Party of Oregon holds a month-long online primary to select which candidate receives their nomination. The party chose candidates in a number of legislative and local races but only one statewide race, Secretary of State.

=== Candidates ===
- Kate Brown, incumbent
- Knute Buehler, surgeon

=== Results ===
Independent Party of Oregon primary results
| Party | Candidate | Votes | % |
|---|---|---|---|
| Republican | Knute Buehler | 348 | 55.68 |
| Democratic | Kate Brown | 277 | 44.32 |
| Total votes | | 625 | 100 |

== Other candidates ==
- Bruce Alexander Knight (Libertarian), store manager
- Robert Wolfe (Progressive), wine salesman
- Seth Woolley (Pacific Green), software engineer

== General election ==
=== Polling ===
| Poll source | Date(s) administered | Sample size | Margin oferror | Kate Brown (D) | Knute Buehler (R, I) | Undecided |
|---|---|---|---|---|---|---|
| The Oregonian | October 25–28, 2012 | 405 | ± 5% | 38% | 23% | 36% |
| DHM Research | October 18–20, 2012 | 500 | ± 2.6%–4.4% | 43% | 37% | 15% |
| Public Policy Polling | June 21–24, 2012 | 686 | ± 3.7% | 48% | 30% | 21% |

=== Results ===
Oregon Secretary of State – General Election Results
| Party | Candidate | Votes | % |
|---|---|---|---|
| Democratic | Kate Brown | 863,656 | 51.28 |
| Republican | Knute Buehler | 727,607 | 43.20 |
| Pacific Green | Seth Woolley | 44,235 | 2.63 |
| Libertarian | Bruce Alexander Knight | 24,273 | 1.44 |
| Progressive | Robert Wolfe | 21,783 | 1.29 |
| | write-ins | 2,561 | 0.15 |
| Total votes | | 1,684,115 | 100 |

=== Results by congressional districts ===
Brown won four of five congressional districts.

| District | Brown | Buehler | Representative |
|---|---|---|---|
| 1st | 52% | 43% | Suzanne Bonamici |
| 2nd | 40% | 56% | Greg Walden |
| 3rd | 65% | 28% | Earl Blumenauer |
| 4th | 50% | 44% | Peter DeFazio |
| 5th | 49% | 47% | Kurt Schrader |
