= General Duffy's Waterhole =

Taphouse and event venue in Redmond, Oregon, US

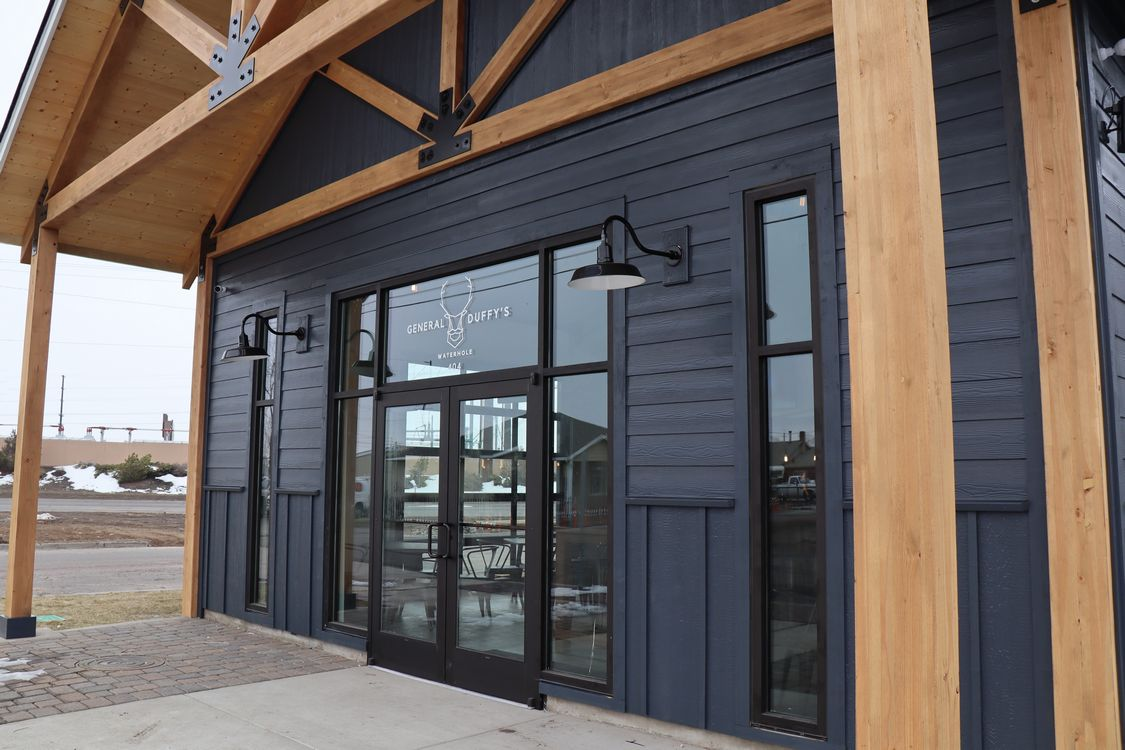
- General Duffy's front entrance
- Interactive map of General Duffy's Waterhole
- Address: 404 N.W. Forest Avenue; Redmond, Oregon; United States
- Coordinates: 44.27137°N 121.17236°W
- Owner: Dick and Susan Robertson
- Capacity: 2,500
- Type: Taphouse, food court, and events venue
- Acreage: 1.4 acres (0.57 ha)

Construction
- Opened: March 2019

Website
- generalduffys.com

General Duffy's Waterhole is a beer and cider taphouse with a food court and two large events venues located in Redmond, Oregon. It opened for business in 2019. Shortly after opening, Duffy's began hosting weekly street markets next to the taphouse. Later that year, General Duffy's was recognized with two awards: one for improving the city's downtown economy, and the other as Redmond's "New Business of the Year". During the coronavirus pandemic, the business survived a period of carry-out only customer service and other mandated restrictions. Duffy's owners used that time to develop The Angle, an outdoor music and events venue with space for up to 2,500 attendees. In late 2021, General Duffy's opened a large special events hall on an adjacent property; Duffy's Annex provides indoor space for music programs and other events year-round.

== Description ==
General Duffy's Waterhole is a pub, food court, and entertainment venue situated on a 1.4-acre (0.57 ha) site in downtown Redmond, Oregon. It includes a taphouse, six food carts, a large patio with picnic tables and fire pits, a large indoor events hall with its own stage and bar area, and a covered concert stage with an outdoor dance floor and large pavilion-type tent to shelter event attendees as well as a block long street area used for outdoor markets during the summer and fall.

The taphouse, food court, and patio occupy the northwest corner of the property. The taphouse has fire-station-style roll-up doors on the east and west sides of the building. The bar has twenty local beers and ciders on tap. It also sells wine and non-alcoholic sodas. The taphouse seats 60 patrons, while the patio adds additional seating at ten picnic tables. The patio also has Adirondack-style chairs available to seat patrons, along with two outdoor fire pits. There are five food carts located next to the patio year-round, each with its own unique cuisine and menu. In the summer, two additional food carts can be located on the property.

Duffy's Annex is located behind the food court on the south side of the property. The Annex is an indoor events facility with its own stage and bar area. It is open year-round and available to host a wide range of celebrations and entertainment events, including music performances, wine tasting, bingo, public lectures, comedy nights, speed dating, and holiday and special occasion parties. When the Annex opened in December 2021, its first event was a Christmas market with forty vendors from the local community. During the Christmas market, Duffy's set aside space to collect Toys for Tots donations for children whose parents could not afford to buy Christmas gifts.

The outdoor event area, officially known as The Angle, is on the east side of the property. It includes a large, covered stage with open-air sides. There is a concrete dance floor in front of the stage and a large pavilion tent next to the dance floor to provide shade and shelter for concertgoers. The Angle hosts concerts featuring well-known bands such as Everclear and Floater as well as individual performers like Aaron Lewis and Easton Corbin. The Angle has the capacity to host up to 2,500 concertgoers. The venue has also been used for bingo games that raise money for local non-profit groups, dance lessons, and cornhole tournaments. The Angle has even hosted a celebration of life event with a Beatles tribute band requested for the occasion by the deceased.

The taphouse and food court are separated from The Angle by a paved street area that is used by private vendors during the summer. The market area provides a place for community vendors to sell local products, artwork, and handmade crafts. The market has space for 22 vendors, which is full all summer. In the fall, the street mall shifted to a farmer's market with fresh produce. The street area is also available to expand the viewing area during concerts at The Angle. Behind the concert area, in the southeast corner of the property, is a fenced-in children's park.

== History ==
The story of General Duffy's Waterhole began in 2014 when Duffy's owner, Dick Robertson, shot a large bull elk during bowhunting season. Robertson had the head mounted and whimsically named the elk General Duffy. However, his wife would not allow the elk head in their house, so Robertson had to find another place for General Duffy. His solution was to build a pub which he named after his elk. Today, General Duffy overlooks the main floor of the taphouse.

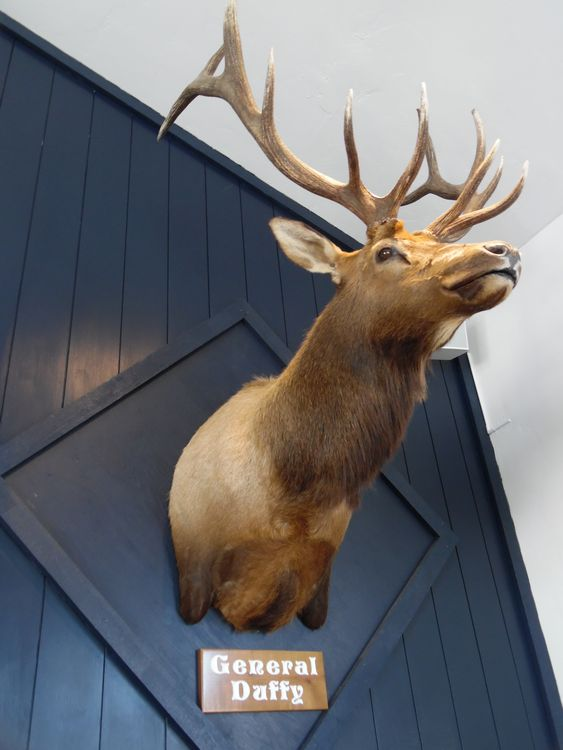
General Duffy overlooking pub tap room

Construction on the taphouse began in 2018 and was completed in early 2019. The taphouse was opened for business in March 2019. By that summer, Duffy's was sponsoring a weekly street market next to the taphouse. The market was the brainchild of Robertson's wife, Susan. In the fall, the street mall shifted to a farmer's market with fresh produce.

In October 2019, Robertson worked with the Klamath County Economic Development Association to buy an abandoned property in downtown Klamath Falls, Oregon. The property was purchased from Klamath County. The purchase deal included an agreement with the Klamath County Board of Commissioners to develop a state-of-the-art taphouse and food court on the vacant Klamath Falls property. It was agreed that the business would be a family-friendly destination that would serve as a regular gathering place for socializing, entertainment, and community activities, like General Duffy's Waterhole in Redmond. Unfortunately, the project was put on hold when the coronavirus pandemic forced businesses around the state to shut down. As a result, Robertson shifted his attention back to his Redmond business.

Just as General Duffy's was finishing its first year in business in early 2020, the coronavirus pandemic resulted in Oregon's governor directing the closure of many businesses, including all restaurants and pubs. Eventually, businesses like Duffy's were allowed to sell takeout beer in growlers, but patrons were not allowed to consume food or beverages on-site.

In 2020, Duffy's was one of five Central Oregon businesses cited for failing to enforce the state's face covering and social distancing rules announced by Governor Kate Brown on July 1. The rules required all workers and patrons in indoor public spaces to wear masks and maintain a 6 feet (1.8 m) of physical distance from each other. The violations were identified by the Oregon Liquor Control Commission during an inspection on July 4, three days after the rules were announced. Statewide, the inspectors issued 74 warnings. A week later, an additional 81 bars and restaurants across the state were cited. General Duffy's received a second citation during that inspection. On both occasions Duffy's employees were wearing masks as required; however, inspectors observed some of Duffy's patrons without masks, which was the basis for both citations.

While the state's pandemic restrictions hurt General Duffy's business, the owners used that time to develop The Angle. As a result, when the restrictions were relaxed, Duffy's was ready to bring people back to their downtown site for beverages, food, and entertainment.

During the pandemic, a building adjacent to Duffy's became vacant. Robertson and his son, Tanner, renovated the building and reopened it as Duffy's Annex. This significantly increased Duffy's event space and provided an indoor facility so that music performances and other events could continue year-round.

Robertson listed the business for sale in September of 2026.

== Reception ==
In 2019, the Central Oregon Association of Realtors presented General Duffy's Waterhole with an award for its significant contribution to Redmond's downtown economy. This was an award that evaluated all the new businesses opened in Central Oregon in 2019. The award specifically recognized the Robertson family for investing in their community and creating a gathering place for local people. The award narrative cited Duffy's taphouse, five food trucks, and shaded patio with outdoor space for children's games, weekly live music, and a lively Saturday market.

Later that year, Central Oregon Daily, a local television news program, highlighted General Duffy's success and growth. The television report cited Duffy's family-friendly atmosphere and noted that a children's playground was being added to the site along with other improvements. It also reported that General Duffy's was planning to build a taphouse and food court in Klamath Falls. As part of the report, a Redmond city official pointed out that General Duffy's had turned an unappealing property into a popular taphouse and food court. According to the city official, Duffy's taphouse and food court significantly improved a dead-end corner of downtown Redmond.

In early 2020, Redmond's Chamber of Commerce selected General Duffy's Waterhole as its 2019 "New Business of the Year". In its announcement, the chamber cited Duffy's "fabulous food carts and drinks".

In 2021, The Source, a Central Oregon newspaper, conducted a readers' survey to identify the best entertainment venues in Central Oregon. Readers voted General Duffy's as the area's Best Bar and Music Venue. The newspaper said that General Duffy's is more than just a bar and a stage – it is a gathering place for the community. It said the taphouse offers a wide selection of beers and ciders, and the food trucks provide Asian, Italian, and traditional American food menus. It also said The Angle added a whole new dimension to the Duffy's site.

The Bulletin, Central Oregon's largest newspaper, highlighted the 2021 Christmas market that was the grand opening event for Duffy's Annex. The newspaper reported that there were forty vendors at the market. It also said that the Annex provided indoor space for future concerts, bingo nights, and other community events. A few days later, Hoodoo Ski Resort held its "WinterVention" event at Duffy's Annex. It was a free event, with the resort giving away $50,000 in raffle prizes, including lift tickets, ski equipment, lodging vouchers, and cold-weather gear. That event was also favorably reported in The Bulletin.
