= 2018 Oregon gubernatorial election =

- November 6, 2018
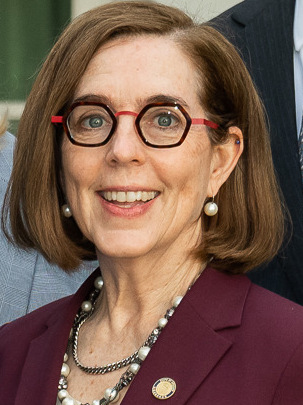

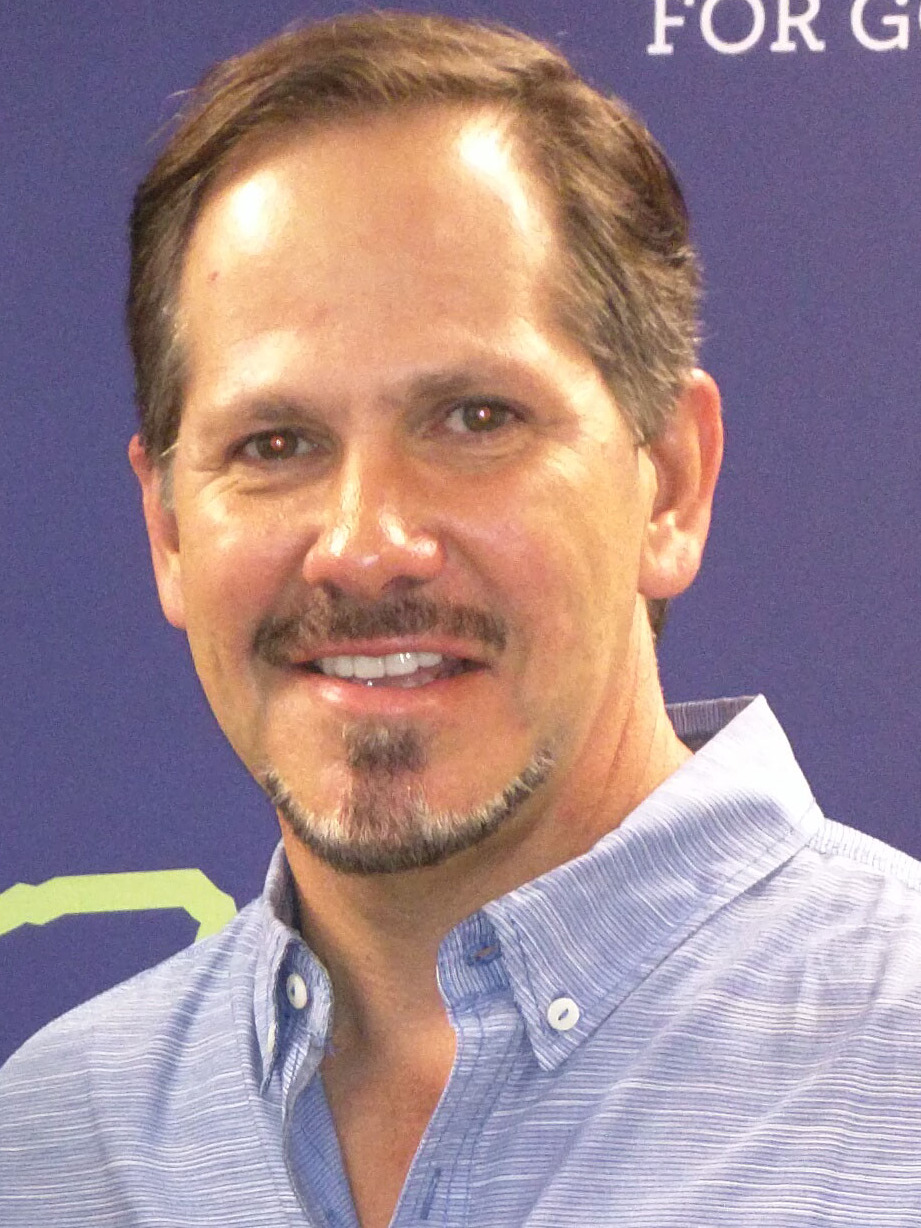
Nominee	Kate Brown	Knute Buehler
Party	Democratic	Republican
Alliance	Working Families
Popular vote	934,498	814,988
Percentage	50.05%	43.65%
- Brown: 40–50% 50–60% 60–70% 70–80% 80–90% >90% Buehler: 40–50% 50–60% 60–70% 70–80% 80–90% >90% Tie: 40–50% 50% No data
Governor before election
Kate Brown
Democratic
Elected Governor
Kate Brown
Democratic

The 2018 Oregon gubernatorial election was held on November 6, 2018, to elect the governor of Oregon to serve a full four-year term. In the 2016 special election, Democratic Governor Kate Brown had been elected to serve the last two years of John Kitzhaber's term.

The Republican Party nominated Knute Buehler, her opponent in the 2012 Oregon secretary of state election; the Independent Party of Oregon nominated Patrick Starnes. Brown, running for a full term, won the election; because of term limits, she became ineligible to seek the governorship again.

== Democratic primary ==
=== Candidates ===
==== Declared ====
- Kate Brown, incumbent governor
- Ed Jones
- Candace Neville

=== Endorsements ===
Kate Brown

U.S. senators

- Jeff Merkley, U.S. senator (D-OR)

Organizations

- Gay & Lesbian Victory Fund
- Human Rights Campaign
- Oregon AFL–CIO
- Oregon League of Conservation Voters
- Planned Parenthood PAC of Oregon

=== Results ===
Results by county: Brown: 40–50%; 50–60%; 60–70%; 70–80%; 80–90%

Democratic primary results
Party	Candidate	Votes	%
Democratic	Kate Brown (incumbent)	324,541	81.9
Democratic	Ed Jones	33,464	8.4
Democratic	Candace Neville	29,110	7.4
Democratic	Write-ins	8,912	2.3
Total votes		396,027	100.0

== Republican primary ==
=== Candidates ===
==== Declared ====
- Keenan Bohach
- Knute Buehler, orthopedic surgeon, state representative and nominee for secretary of state in 2012
- Sam Carpenter, businessman and candidate for the U.S. Senate in 2014 and 2016
- Jonathan Edwards III
- Brett Hyland
- Jeff Smith, small business owner
- David Stauffer
- Jack Tracy
- Greg Wooldridge, former Blue Angels commanding officer

==== Withdrew ====
- Bruce Cuff, real estate broker and candidate for governor in 2014 and 2016 (endorsed Greg Wooldridge)

==== Declined ====
- Lori Chavez-DeRemer, mayor of Happy Valley and nominee for the state house in 2016
- Cedric Ross Hayden, state representative
- Mike McLane, House minority leader
- Bud Pierce, physician and nominee for governor in 2016
- Bill Post, state representative
- Dennis Richardson, Oregon secretary of state, former state representative and nominee for governor in 2014

=== Endorsements ===
Knute Buehler

U.S. senators

- Gordon H. Smith, former U.S. senator (R-OR)

State legislators

- Greg Barreto, state representative
- Cliff Bentz, state senator
- Daniel Bonham, state representative
- Sal Esquivel, state representative
- Lynn Findley, state representative
- Bill Hansell, state senator
- Dallas Heard, state representative
- Mike McLane, state representative
- Ron Noble, state representative
- Andy Olson, state representative
- E. Werner Reschke, state representative
- Gene Whisnant, state representative

Individuals

- Rob Harris, co-chair of the Independent Party of Oregon
- Antoinette Hatfield, former first lady of Oregon
- Phil Knight, businessman, co-founder of Nike

Organizations

- National Federation of Independent Business
- Oregon Cattlemen's Association
- Oregon Farm Bureau

Newspapers

- Blue Mountain Eagle
- The Bulletin
- Corvallis Gazette-Times
- The Daily Astorian
- East Oregonian
- The Oregonian
- Portland Tribune
- The Register-Guard
- Willamette Week
Greg Wooldridge

State legislators

- Bill Post, state representative

Organizations

- Oregon Right to Life

=== Debates ===
Host network	Date	Link(s)	Participants		
Host network	Date	Link(s)	Knute Buehler	Sam Carpenter	Greg Wooldridge
KXL-FM	May 11, 2018		Invited	Invited	Invited

=== Polling ===
Poll source	Date(s) administered	Sample size	Margin of error	Knute Buehler	Sam Carpenter	Lori Chavez-DeRemer	Greg Wooldridge	Other	Undecided
Global Strategy Group (D)	May 3–6, 2018	438	± 4.7%	33%	25%	–	8%	–	33%
Triton Polling & Research (R-Carpenter)	April 19–22, 2018	1,013	± 3.1%	39%	24%	–	12%	6% (Note: Bruce Cuff and Jeff Smith with 3%)	20%
Triton Polling & Research (R-Carpenter)	March 19–25, 2018	628	–	23%	23%	–	4%	–	50%
iCitizen	September 13–28, 2017	168	± 3.9%	28%	–	8%	31%	6%	26%

=== Results ===
Results by county: Buehler: 30–40%; 40–50%; 50–60%; 60–70%; Carpenter: 30–40%; 40–50%; 50–60%

Republican primary results
Party	Candidate	Votes	%
Republican	Knute Buehler	144,103	45.9
Republican	Sam Carpenter	90,572	28.8
Republican	Greg C. Wooldridge	63,049	20.1
Republican	Bruce Cuff	4,857	1.5
Republican	Jeff Smith	4,691	1.5
Republican	David Stauffer	2,096	0.7
Republican	Write-ins	1,701	0.5
Republican	Jonathan Edwards III	861	0.3
Republican	Keenan Bohach	787	0.3
Republican	Brett Hyland	755	0.2
Republican	Jack W. Tacy	512	0.2
Total votes		313,984	100

== Independent Party primary ==
=== Candidates ===
==== Declared ====
- Skye Allen
- Dan Pistoresi
- Patrick Starnes

==== Results ====
Independent primary results
Party	Candidate	Votes	%
Independent Party	Write-ins	13,497	56.8
Independent Party	Patrick Starnes	6,030	25.4
Independent Party	Skye J. Allen	2,405	10.6
Independent Party	Dan Pistoresi	1,846	7.8
Total votes		23,778	100.0

== General election ==
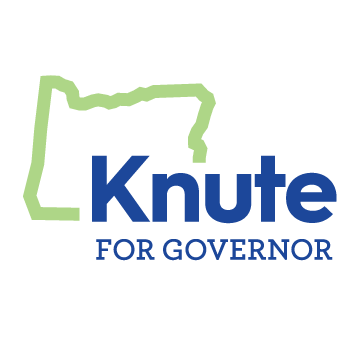
Knute Buehler campaign logo

=== Debates ===
- Complete video of debate, October 2, 2018
- Third party debate, featuring Nick Chen (L), Patrick Starnes (I), and Chris Henry (P), hosted by former Green Party candidate Alex DiBlasi, October 6, 2018
- Complete video of debate, October 9, 2018

=== Predictions ===
Source	Ranking	As of
The Cook Political Report	Tossup	October 26, 2018
The Washington Post	Tossup	November 5, 2018
FiveThirtyEight	Likely D	November 5, 2018
Rothenberg Political Report	Tilt D	November 1, 2018
Sabato's Crystal Ball	Lean D	November 5, 2018
RealClearPolitics	Tossup	November 4, 2018
Daily Kos	Lean D	November 5, 2018
Fox News (Note: The Fox News Midterm Power Rankings uniquely does not contain a category for Safe/Solid races.)	Lean D	November 5, 2018
Politico	Lean D	November 5, 2018
Governing	Tossup	November 5, 2018

=== Polling ===
View source data.

Aggregate polls

Source of poll aggregation	Dates administered	Dates updated	Kate Brown (D)	Knute Buehler (R)	Other/Undecided (Note: Calculated by taking the difference of 100% and all other candidates combined.)	Margin
Real Clear Politics	October 4–30, 2018	October 30, 2018	44.0%	39.7%	16.3%	Brown +4.3%

Poll source	Date(s) administered	Sample size	Margin of error	Kate Brown (D)	Knute Buehler (R)	Patrick Starnes (IPO)	Other	Undecided
Hoffman Research Group	October 29–30, 2018	694	± 3.7%	45%	42%	4%	2%	7%
Emerson College	October 26–28, 2018	747	± 3.7%	47%	42%	–	7%	4%
DHM Research	October 4–11, 2018	500	± 4.4%	40%	35%	4%	3%	17%
Riley Research Associates	September 24 – October 7, 2018	356	± 5.0%	49%	45%	4%	3%	–
Clout Research (R)	September 20–23, 2018	679	± 3.8%	42%	41%	–	–	–
Hoffman Research Group	September 12–13, 2018	680	± 3.8%	46%	36%	4%	2%	12%
Causeway Solutions (R-No Supermajorities PAC)	September 6–11, 2018	2,831	± 2.0%	41%	43%	–	–	–
Clout Research (R)	July 30–31, 2018	559	± 4.1%	42%	43%	–	–	15%
Gravis Marketing	July 16–17, 2018	770	± 3.5%	45%	45%	–	–	10%
Triton Polling & Research (R-Carpenter)	March 19–25, 2018	2,067	± 2.2%	41%	46%	–	–	14%
DHM Research	January 25–31, 2018	604	± 4.0%	46%	29%	–	–	25%
Zogby Analytics	November 10–12, 2017	508	± 4.4%	39%	36%	–	–	25%
iCitizen	September 13–28, 2017	645	± 3.9%	41%	40%	–	11%	8%

Hypothetical polling

with Sam Carpenter

Poll source	Date(s) administered	Sample size	Margin of error	Kate Brown (D)	Sam Carpenter (R)	Other	Undecided
Triton Polling & Research (R-Carpenter)	March 19–25, 2018	2,067	± 2.2%	41%	46%	–	13%
Zogby Analytics	November 10–12, 2017	508	± 4.4%	38%	36%	–	26%

with Greg Wooldridge

Poll source	Date(s) administered	Sample size	Margin of error	Kate Brown (D)	Greg Wooldridge (R)	Other	Undecided
Triton Polling & Research (R-Carpenter)	March 19–25, 2018	2,067	± 2.2%	42%	47%	–	11%
iCitizen	September 13–28, 2017	645	± 3.9%	42%	39%	11%	7%

with Lori Chavez-DeRemer

Poll source	Date(s) administered	Sample size	Margin of error	Kate Brown (D)	Lori Chavez-DeRemer (R)	Other	Undecided
iCitizen	September 13–28, 2017	645	± 3.9%	40%	34%	17%	8%

=== Results ===
Oregon gubernatorial election, 2018
Party	Candidate	Votes	%	±%
Democratic	Kate Brown (incumbent)	934,498	50.05%	−0.57%
Republican	Knute Buehler	814,988	43.65%	+0.20%
Independent Party	Patrick Starnes	53,392	2.86%	+0.42%
Libertarian	Nick Chen	28,927	1.55%	−0.77%
Constitution	Aaron Auer	21,145	1.13%	+0.13%
Progressive	Chris Henry	11,013	0.59%	N/A
Write-in		3,034	0.16%	-0.01%
Total votes		1,866,997	100.00%	N/A
Democratic hold				

==== By county ====
County	Kate Brown Democratic		Knute Buehler Republican		Various candidates Other parties		Margin		Total votes cast
County	%	#	%	#	%	#	%	#	Total votes cast
Baker	19.0%	1,572	72.9%	6,023	8.1%	669	-53.9%	-4,451	8,264
Benton	60.1%	26,592	33.9%	14,990	6.3%	2,649	26.2%	11,602	44,231
Clackamas	45.5%	91,088	49.2%	98,468	5.3%	10,710	-3.7%	-7,380	200,266
Clatsop	48.0%	8,909	44.7%	8,294	7.3%	1,355	3.3%	615	18,558
Columbia	38.7%	9,519	52.6%	12,953	8.7%	2,145	-13.9%	-3,434	24,617
Coos	33.5%	9,622	57.5%	16,520	9.0%	2,585	-24.0%	-6,898	28,727
Crook	19.8%	2,285	73.8%	8,516	6.4%	735	-54.0%	-6,231	11,536
Curry	35.9%	4,141	56.1%	6,474	8.0%	918	-20.2%	-2,333	11,533
Deschutes	42.3%	40,676	52.0%	49,983	5.7%	5,440	-9.7%	-9,307	96,099
Douglas	24.0%	11,824	65.8%	32,413	10.2%	5,001	-41.8%	-20,589	49,238
Gilliam	22.0%	218	69.6%	691	8.4%	114	-47.6%	-473	993
Grant	16.8%	649	75.9%	2,923	7.4%	281	-59.1%	-2,274	3,853
Harney	16.5%	584	76.7%	2,722	6.8%	241	-60.2%	-343	3,547
Hood River	59.9%	6,485	35.0%	3,789	5.1%	554	24.9%	2,696	10,828
Jackson	41.4%	42,207	50.7%	51,623	7.9%	8,077	-9.3%	-9,416	101,907
Jefferson	29.8%	2,635	62.3%	5,518	7.9%	699	-32.5%	-2,883	8,852
Josephine	30.2%	12,214	60.5%	24,499	9.3%	3,757	-30.3%	-12,285	40,470
Klamath	22.3%	6,301	67.7%	19,134	10.0%	2,821	-45.4%	-12,833	28,256
Lake	13.4%	476	78.0%	2,774	8.6%	307	-64.6%	-22,98	3,557
Lane	54.7%	96,841	38.2%	67,737	7.1%	12,594	16.5%	29,104	177,172
Lincoln	52.1%	12,610	40.8%	9,884	7.9%	1,725	11.3%	2,726	24,219
Linn	30.1%	16,461	60.5%	33,051	9.4%	5,150	-30.4%	-16,590	54,662
Malheur	24.1%	2,159	66.9%	6,000	9.0%	811	-42.8%	-3,841	8,970
Marion	43.5%	55,238	49.9%	63,323	6.6%	8,417	-6.4%	-8,085	126,978
Morrow	22.5%	844	67.5%	2,534	10.0%	376	-45.0%	-1,690	3,754
Multnomah	73.9%	279,384	22.1%	83,507	4.0%	15,207	51.8%	195,877	378,098
Polk	41.6%	15,529	51.8%	19,341	6.6%	2,445	-10.2%	-3,812	37,315
Sherman	19.3%	190	74.7%	736	6.0%	59	-55.4%	-546	985
Tillamook	42.7%	5,616	50.3%	6,606	7.3%	920	-7.6%	-990	13,142
Umatilla	29.4%	7,085	63.0%	15,178	7.6%	1,845	-33.6%	-8,093	24,108
Union	24.5%	2,877	67.9%	7,983	7.6%	896	-43.4%	-5,106	11,756
Wallowa	27.0%	1,088	66.2%	2,668	6.8%	276	-39.2%	-1,580	4,032
Wasco	40.5%	4,604	51.4%	5,841	8.1%	912	-10.9%	-1,237	11,357
Washington	55.5%	137,886	39.2%	97,286	5.3%	13,307	16.3%	40,600	248,479
Wheeler	19.3%	158	72.6%	594	8.1%	66	-53.3%	-436	818
Yamhill	39.1%	17,931	53.3%	24,412	7.6%	3,477	-14.2%	-6,481	45,820

==== By congressional district ====
Brown carried two out of the state's five congressional districts, losing two swing districts that simultaneously voted for Democrats in the US House.

District	Kate Brown	Knute Buehler	Elected Representative
1st	54%	41%	Suzanne Bonamici
2nd	35%	57%	Greg Walden
3rd	69%	26%	Earl Blumenauer
4th	45%	47%	Peter DeFazio
5th	46%	48%	Kurt Schrader
