= Knute Buehler =

American physician and politician

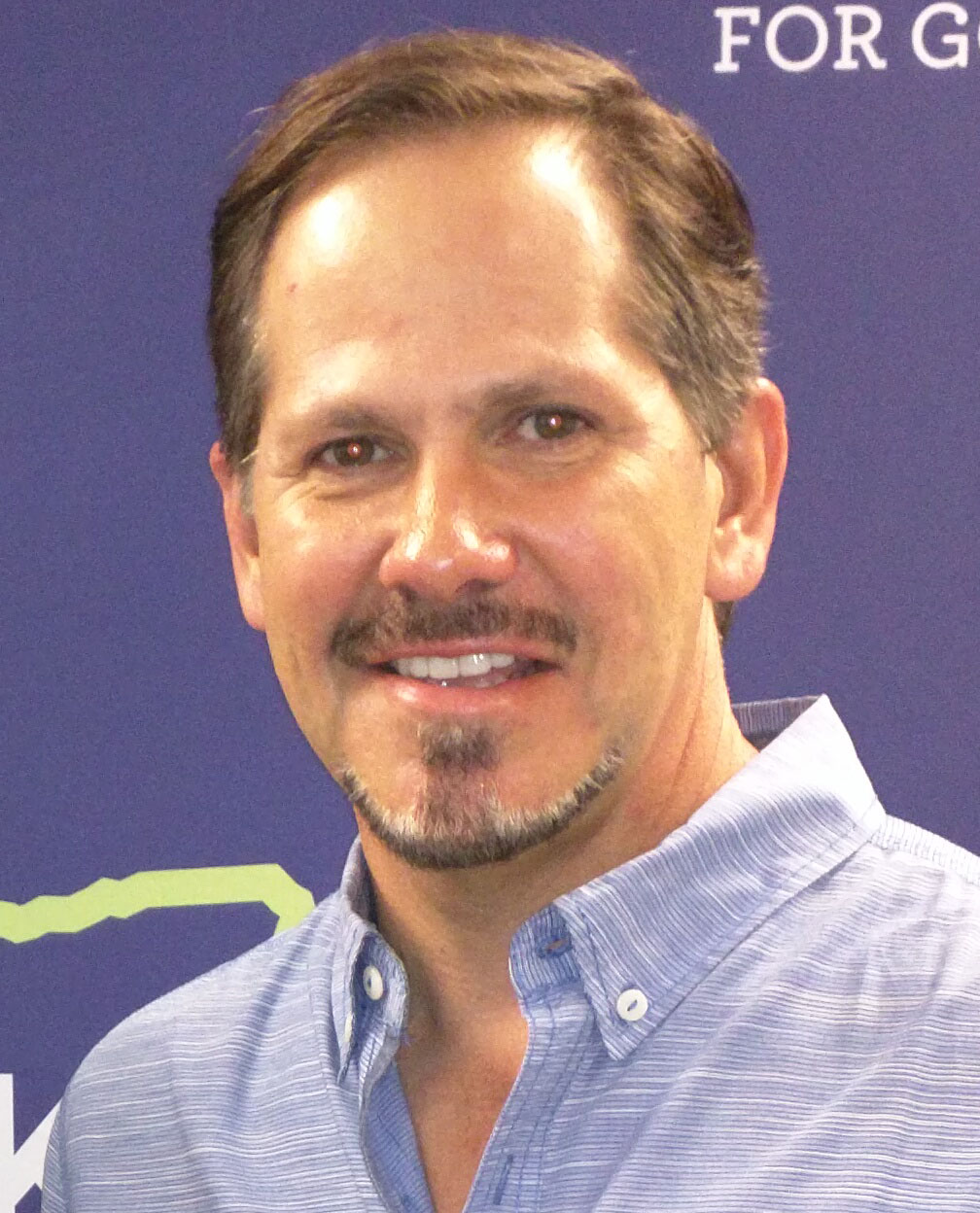
- Buehler in 2018

Member of the Oregon House of Representatives from the 54th district
- In office January 12, 2015 – January 15, 2019
- Preceded by: Jason Conger
- Succeeded by: Cheri Helt

Personal details
- Born: Knute Carl Buehler; August 1, 1964 (age 62) Roseburg, Oregon, U.S.
- Party: Republican (before 2021); Independent (2021–present)
- Children: 2
- Education: Oregon State University (BS); Merton College, Oxford (MA); Johns Hopkins University (MD)

Knute Carl Buehler (born August 1, 1964) is an American physician and politician who served as the Oregon State Representative for the 54th district from 2015 until January 2019. He was the Republican nominee for Governor of Oregon in the 2018 election, losing to incumbent Democrat Kate Brown. In 2021, he stated that he had left the Republican Party, citing the state party's response to the January 6 United States Capitol attack as his primary motivation. Buehler is no longer registered with any political party.

== Early life ==
Buehler is originally from Roseburg, Oregon, and was born in 1964. He attended Oregon State University (OSU) where he played on the varsity baseball team. He graduated from OSU in 1986 with degrees in history and microbiology. Buehler attended Merton College, Oxford as OSU's first Rhodes Scholar, studying philosophy, politics and economics, before graduating from the Johns Hopkins School of Medicine in Baltimore, Maryland.

An orthopedic surgeon, he lives in Bend in Central Oregon with his wife and two children. He worked on political independent Ross Perot's presidential campaign in 1992 and was one of the primary authors of a campaign finance ballot measure which passed by a wide margin in 1994. The limits were struck down by the Oregon Supreme Court in 1997 as a violation of the state's wide-ranging freedom of speech protections.

== Political career ==
=== 2012 Oregon Secretary of State campaign ===
Buehler was the unsuccessful Republican Party nominee for Oregon Secretary of State in 2012, losing to incumbent secretary of state Democrat Kate Brown with five candidates on the ballot.

=== State representative ===
Buehler won election to the Oregon House of Representatives in 2014, defeating Democrat Craig Wilhelm. In his first session as a lawmaker he was the primary author of a new law which allows women in Oregon to buy oral contraception over the counter without a doctors prescription. Buehler was re-elected in 2016, narrowly defeating Democrat Gena Goodman-Campbell.

Buehler describes himself as a moderate and his pro-choice stances on abortion have been a source of political tension "from left and right." In July 2016, Buehler received a 65% rating from the American Conservative Union, although by November of that year it had dropped to 58%. In November 2017, Knute Buehler was the first Republican to call for the resignation of fellow Republican State Senator Jeff Kruse following multiple allegations of sexual harassment.

=== Ethics complaints ===
The Democratic Party of Oregon Chair filed three ethics complaints against Buehler in the spring of 2017 regarding his campaign finance disclosures for the last four years. Two claims were dismissed by a state ethics committee. Buehler avoided civil penalties in the third complaint by acknowledging his violation of an Oregon statute which requires listing of all income received over $1,000 from any source as part of a state-mandated Letter of Education, along with restating his finance declarations retroactively to 2013. Buehler said the censure was "politically motivated," the original filers claimed that "he continues to hide income."

=== Gubernatorial campaign ===
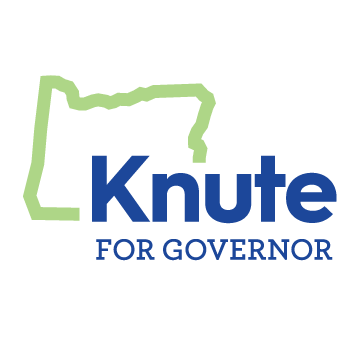
Campaign logo

Almost immediately after his re-election, Buehler was considered a front-runner for the Republican nomination to run for governor in 2018. Republicans claimed Democrats were already working to undercut Buehler through legislative committee assignments. On August 3, 2017, Buehler announced he would run for Governor of Oregon in the 2018 election. On May 15, 2018, Buehler won the Republican nomination for Governor of Oregon to face off against Democratic incumbent Kate Brown in November 2018, in a rematch of the 2012 Secretary of State election. Buehler lost the general election to Kate Brown by 6.4% Both Brown and Buehler raised and spent record amounts in their campaigns.

=== Political positions ===
Buehler is considered a fiscally conservative moderate Republican. He is pro-choice on the issue of abortion. On immigration, he opposes sanctuary cities and opposes Oregon's statewide sanctuary policy. He supports gay rights, including same-sex marriage, and voted to ban conversion therapy from being used on minors. Buehler said during the gubernatorial campaign that he supported Oregon's capital punishment law which was passed by Oregon voters in 1984. In the wake of the contentious events of 6 January 2021 in Washington D.C., and especially a controversial statement by the Oregon Republican Party issued by its chairman Bill Currier two weeks afterwards, Buehler announced his departure from the Republican party to become a non-affiliated voter. The New York Times wrote "The night after his party's leadership passed a formal resolution promoting the false flag theory, Mr. Buehler claimed to have cracked open a local microbrew and filed to change his registration from Republican to independent. 'It was very painful', he said. Knute is no longer registered with any political party.

== Electoral history ==
Oregon's 2nd Congressional District Republican primary, 2020
Party	Candidate	Votes	%
Republican	Cliff Bentz	37,045	31.4
Republican	Knute Buehler	25,976	22.0
Republican	Jason Atkinson	22,966	19.5
Republican	Jimmy Crumpacker	21,117	17.9
Republican	Travis A. Fager	4,201	3.6
Republican	Jeff Smith	2,494	2.1
Republican	Mark R. Roberts	1,307	1.1
Republican	Justin Livingston	1,306	1.1
Republican	David R. Campbell	410	0.3
Republican	Glenn Carey	280	0.2
Republican	Kenneth W. Medenbach	262	0.2
Republican	Write-in	447	0.4
Total votes		117,811	100.0

Oregon Gubernatorial Election, 2018
Party	Candidate	Votes	%
Democratic	Kate Brown (Incumbent)	934,498	50.05%
Republican	Knute Buehler	814,988	43.65%
Independent Party	Patrick Starnes	53,392	2.86%
Libertarian	Nick Chen	28,927	1.55%
Constitution	Aaron Auer	21,145	1.13%
Progressive	Chris Henry	11,013	0.59%
n/a	Write-ins	3,034	0.16%
Total votes		1,866,997	100.0%

Oregon Gubernatorial Republican Primary Election, 2018
Party	Candidate	Votes	%
Republican	Knute Buehler	144,103	45.9
Republican	Sam Carpenter	90,572	28.8
Republican	Greg C. Wooldridge	63,049	20.1
Republican	Bruce Cuff	4,857	1.5
Republican	Jeff Smith	4,691	1.5
Republican	David Stauffer	2,096	0.7
Republican	Write-ins	1,701	0.5
Republican	Jonathan Edwards III	861	0.3
Republican	Keenan Bohach	787	0.3
Republican	Brett Hyland	755	0.2
Republican	Jack W. Tacy	512	0.2
Total votes		313,984	100

Oregon House of Representatives 54th District, 2016
Party	Candidate	Votes	%
Republican	Knute Buehler	19,352	51.92
Democratic	Gena Goodman-Campbell	17,804	47.77
Write-In		117	0.31
Total votes		37,273	100

Oregon House of Representatives 54th District, 2014
Party	Candidate	Votes	%
Republican	Knute Buehler	15,348	58.23
Democratic	Craig Wilhelm	10,876	41.26
Write-In		134	0.51
Total votes		26,358	100

Oregon Secretary of State 2012
Party	Candidate	Votes	%
Democratic	Kate Brown	863,656	51.28
Republican	Knute Buehler	727,607	43.20
Pacific Green	Seth Woolley	44,235	2.63
Libertarian	Bruce Alexander Knight	24,273	1.44
Progressive	Robert Wolfe	21,783	1.29
	write-ins	2,561	0.15
Total votes		1,684,115	100

== See also ==
- List of party switchers in the United States

Party political offices
Preceded by Bud Pierce	Republican nominee for Governor of Oregon; 2018	Succeeded by Christine Drazan
