= 2016 Oregon gubernatorial special election =

- November 8, 2016
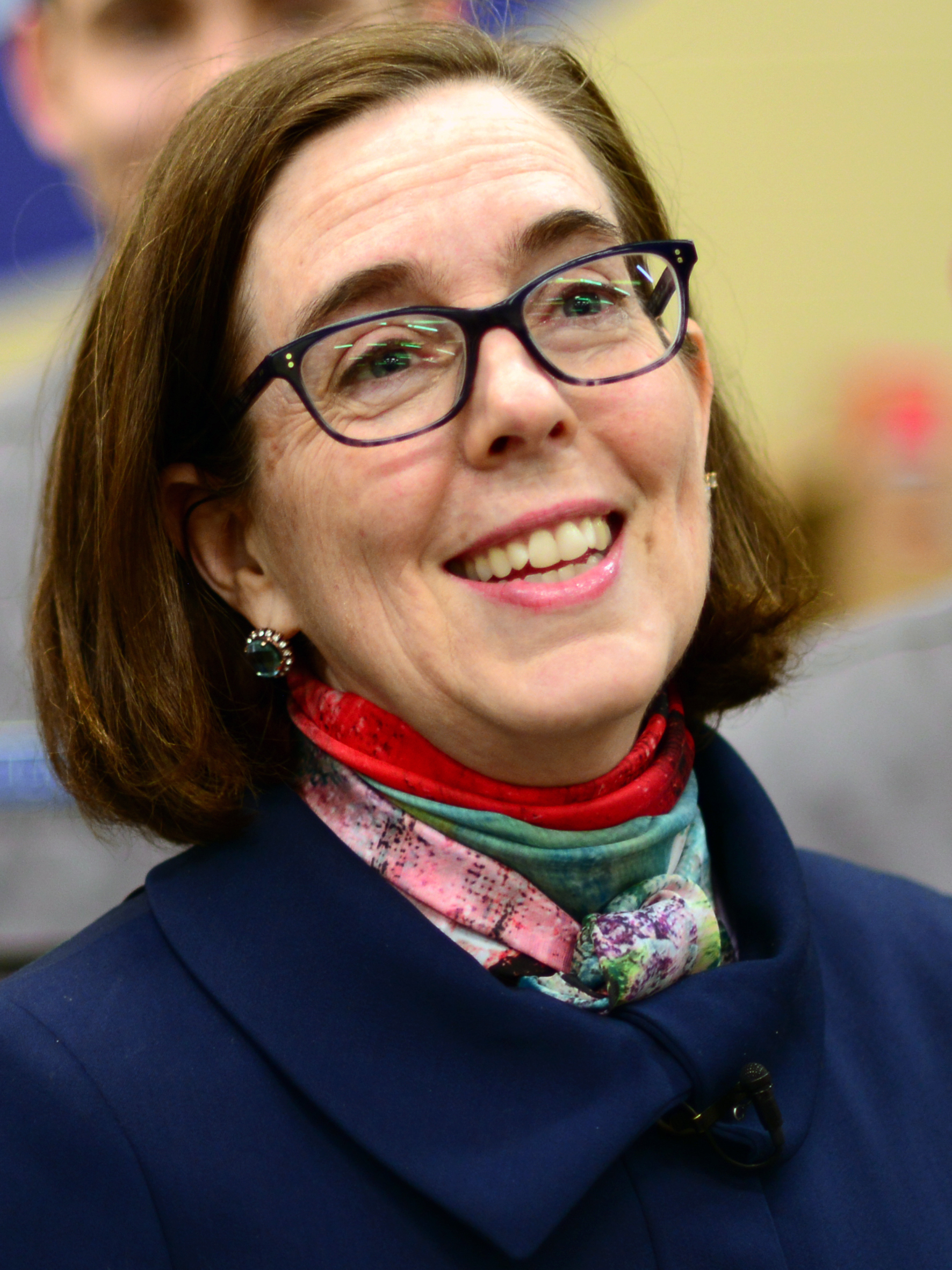

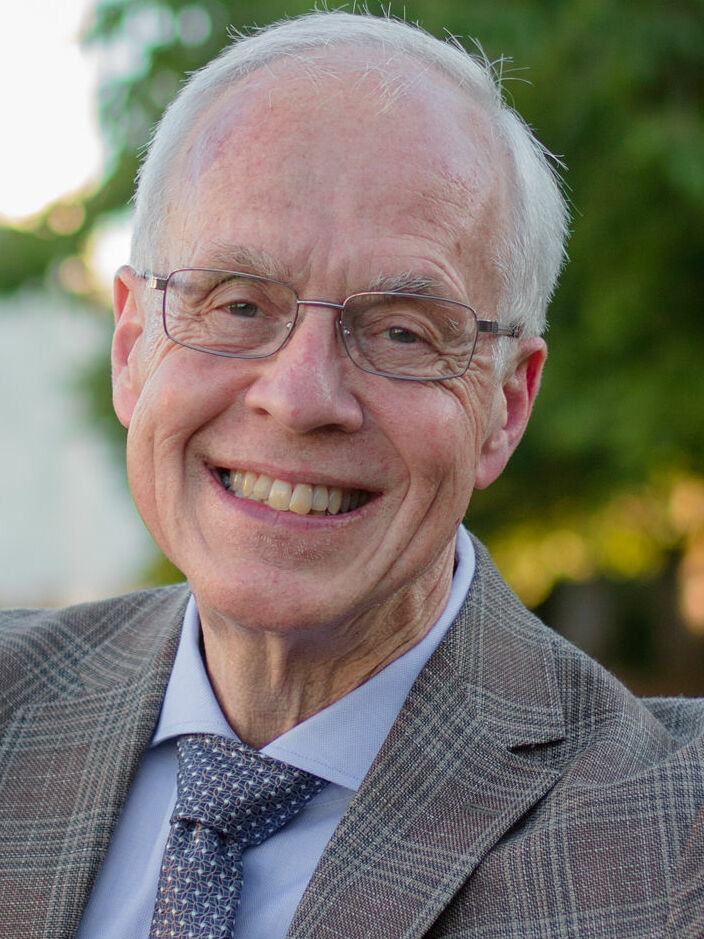
Nominee	Kate Brown	Bud Pierce
Party	Democratic	Republican
Alliance	Working Families
Popular vote	985,027	845,609
Percentage	50.62%	43.45%
- Brown: 40–50% 50–60% 60–70% 70–80% 80–90% >90% Pierce: 40–50% 50–60% 60–70% 70–80% 80–90% >90% Tie: 40–50% No data
Governor before election
Kate Brown
Democratic
Elected Governor
Kate Brown
Democratic

The 2016 Oregon gubernatorial special election took place on November 8, 2016, to elect the Governor of Oregon, concurrently with the 2016 U.S. presidential election, as well as elections for the U.S. Senate and U.S. House of Representatives, other gubernatorial elections and various state and local elections.

The election determined who would fill the remaining two years of the term of Democratic governor John Kitzhaber, who was re-elected in 2014 and resigned in February 2015. Incumbent Democratic governor Kate Brown, who as Oregon Secretary of State succeeded to the governorship, ran for election to the office. In primary elections held on May 17, Brown easily captured the Democratic nomination, and the Republicans picked Salem oncologist Bud Pierce.

Brown won the election and became the first openly LGBT person elected to a term as governor in U.S. history. This election was the first time since 1990 that a woman was elected Governor of Oregon. As of 2026, it was also the most recent gubernatorial special election in the U.S., excluding recall elections.

== Democratic primary ==
=== Candidates ===
==== Declared ====
- Julian Bell, critical care and pulmonary medicine specialist
- Kate Brown, incumbent governor
- Chet Chance, professional driver
- Kevin M. Forsythe, Walmart employee
- Steve Johnson, health worker
- Dave Stauffer, environmental engineer

==== Declined ====
- Brad Avakian, State Labor Commissioner (running for secretary of state)
- Tina Kotek, Speaker of the Oregon House of Representatives
- Ted Wheeler, state treasurer (running for Mayor of Portland)

=== Results ===
Results by county: Brown: 50–60%; 60–70%; 70–80%; 80–90%

Oregon gubernatorial special election, 2016 Democratic primary
Party	Candidate	Votes	%
Democratic	Kate Brown (incumbent)	494,890	83.03
Democratic	Julian Bell	49,313	8.27
Democratic	Dave Stauffer	16,108	2.70
Democratic	Steve Johnson	13,363	2.24
Democratic	Kevin M. Forsythe	10,147	1.70
Democratic	Chet Chance	5,636	0.95
Democratic	Write-ins	6,595	1.11
Total votes		596,052	100.00

== Republican primary ==
=== Candidates ===
==== Declared ====
- Allen Alley, former chairman of the Oregon Republican Party, nominee for Oregon State Treasurer in 2008 and candidate for governor in 2010
- Bruce Cuff, real estate broker and candidate for governor in 2014
- Bob Forthan, perennial candidate
- Bob Niemeyer, engineering company owner and candidate for OR-01 in 2014
- Bud Pierce, physician

==== Declined ====
- Shane Bemis, Mayor of Gresham
- Knute Buehler, state representative and nominee for secretary of state in 2012
- Sid Leiken, Lane County Commissioner, former mayor of Springfield and candidate for Oregon's 4th congressional district in 2010 (running for secretary of state)
- Julie Parrish, state representative
- Dennis Richardson, former state representative and nominee for governor in 2014 (running for secretary of state)
- Sherrie Sprenger, state representative
- Monica Wehby, pediatric neurosurgeon and nominee for the U.S. Senate in 2014

=== Polling ===
Poll source	Date(s) administered	Sample size	Margin of error	Allen Alley	Bruce Cuff	Bob Forthan	Bob Neimeyer	Bud Pierce	Undecided
DHM Research	May 6–9, 2016	324	± 5.7%	22%	3%	1%	5%	25%	44%

=== Results ===
Results by county: Pierce: 30–40%; 40–50%; 50–60%; 60–70%; Alley: 30–40%; 40–50%

Oregon gubernatorial special election, 2016 Republican primary
Party	Candidate	Votes	%
Republican	William C. Pierce	171,158	47.66
Republican	Allen Alley	103,388	28.79
Republican	Bruce Cuff	41,598	11.58
Republican	Bob Niemeyer	35,669	9.93
Republican	Bob Forthan	4,290	1.19
Republican	Write-ins	3,020	0.84
Total votes		359,123	100.00

== Independent Party primary ==
The Independent Party of Oregon officially qualified as a major party on August 17, 2015.

=== Candidates ===
==== Declared ====
- Patrick Barney
- Cliff Thomason, realtor

==== Declined ====
- Betsy Johnson, Democratic state senator

=== Results ===
Results by county. Blue indicates a win by Thomason, yellow a win by Barney.

Oregon gubernatorial special election, 2016 Independent primary
Party	Candidate	Votes	%
Independent Party	Cliff Thomason	9,806	34.89
Independent Party	Patrick Barney	6,840	24.34
Independent Party	Write-ins	11,460	40.77
Total votes		28,106	100.00

== Minor parties ==
- Aaron Donald Auer (Constitution Party), candidate for governor in 2014
- James Foster (Libertarian Party), candidate for OR-01 in 2014

== General election ==
=== Debates ===
- Complete video of debate, October 13, 2016 - C-SPAN
- Complete video of debate, October 20, 2016 - C-SPAN

=== Predictions ===
Source	Ranking	As of
The Cook Political Report	Likely D	August 12, 2016
Daily Kos	Safe D	November 8, 2016
Rothenberg Political Report	Safe D	November 3, 2016
Sabato's Crystal Ball	Safe D	November 7, 2016
Real Clear Politics	Likely D	November 1, 2016
Governing	Safe D	October 27, 2016

=== Polling ===
View source data.

Aggregate polls

Source of poll aggregation	Dates administered	Dates updated	Kate Brown (D)	Bud Pierce (R)	Other/Undecided (Note: Calculated by taking the difference of 100% and all other candidates combined.)	Margin
Real Clear Politics	October 4–29, 2016	October 29, 2016	45.5%	35.5%	19.0%	Brown +10.0%

Poll source	Date(s) administered	Sample size	Margin of error	Kate Brown (D)	Bud Pierce (R)	Cliff Thomason (I)	James Foster (L)	Other	Undecided
SurveyMonkey	November 1–7, 2016	1,595	± 4.6%	56%	41%	—	—	—	3%
SurveyMonkey	October 31 – November 6, 2016	1,483	± 4.6%	56%	40%	—	—	—	4%
SurveyMonkey	October 28 – November 3, 2016	1,150	± 4.6%	56%	40%	—	—	—	4%
SurveyMonkey	October 27 – November 2, 2016	934	± 4.6%	55%	41%	—	—	—	4%
SurveyMonkey	October 26 – November 1, 2016	809	± 4.6%	54%	41%	—	—	—	5%
SurveyMonkey	October 25–31, 2016	743	± 4.6%	54%	42%	—	—	—	4%
FOX 12 Oregon/DHM Research	October 24–29, 2016	504	± 4.4%	42%	33%	4%	3%	4%	15%
Clout Research (R)	October 20–21, 2016	928	± 3.2%	45%	43%	—	—	6%	6%
KGW Oregonian/Riley Research	October 4–14, 2016	608	± 4.0%	48%	34%	—	—	—	13%
Oregon Public Broadcasting/DHM Research	October 6–13, 2016	600	± 4.0%	46%	33%	4%	3%	—	12%
KATU-TV/SurveyUSA	October 10–12, 2016	654	± 3.9%	46%	42%	—	—	4%	8%
iCitizen	September 2–7, 2016	610	± 4.0%	44%	27%	3%	3%	—	23%
KATU-TV/DHM Research	September 1–6, 2016	517	± 4.3%	43%	35%	—	—	—	18%
Clout Research (R)	July 9–13, 2016	701	± 3.7%	43%	42%	5%	2%	—	7%
iCitizen	June 23–27, 2016	555	± 4.0%	42%	35%	—	—	—	23%
Action Solutions→	June 1–2, 2016	600	± 5.7%	39%	37%	—	—	—	24%
Moore Information	April 20, 2015	500	± 4.0%	45%	27%	—	—	—	28%

→ Indicates an internal poll conducted on behalf of Bud Pierce.

Hypothetical polling

with Allen Alley

Poll source	Date(s) administered	Sample size	Margin of error	Kate Brown (D)	Allen Alley (R)	Other	Undecided
Moore Information	April 20, 2015	500	± 4.0%	47%	32%	—	21%

with Shane Bemis

Poll source	Date(s) administered	Sample size	Margin of error	Kate Brown (D)	Shane Bemis (R)	Other	Undecided
Moore Information	April 20, 2015	500	± 4.0%	45%	26%	—	28%

with Dennis Richardson

Poll source	Date(s) administered	Sample size	Margin of error	Kate Brown (D)	Dennis Richardson (R)	Other	Undecided
Moore Information	April 20, 2015	500	± 4.0%	48%	41%	—	12%

=== Results ===
Oregon gubernatorial special election, 2016
Party	Candidate	Votes	%	±%
Democratic	Kate Brown (incumbent)	985,027	50.62%	+0.73%
Republican	Bud Pierce	845,609	43.45%	−0.68%
Independent Party	Cliff Thomason	47,481	2.44%	N/A
Libertarian	James Foster	45,191	2.32%	+0.83%
Constitution	Aaron Donald Auer	19,400	1.00%	−0.08%
Write-in		3,338	0.17%	-0.28%
Total votes		1,946,046	100.00%	N/A
Democratic hold				

==== By county ====
County	Kate Brown Democratic		Bud Pierce Republican		Various candidates Other parties	
County	%	#	%	#	%	#
Baker	23.55%	2,047	69.83%	6,069	6.62%	575
Benton	59.28%	28,043	34.97%	16,543	5.76%	2,722
Clackamas	46.36%	96,735	48.35%	100,882	5.26%	11,030
Clatsop	50.35%	9,667	43.88%	8,425	5.75%	1,106
Columbia	42.4%	11,020	49.72%	12,925	7.89%	2,048
Coos	37.44%	11,500	54.98%	16,889	7.58%	2,330
Crook	24.83%	2,990	68.37%	8,232	6.8%	818
Curry	40.38%	4,947	52.32%	6,410	7.3%	894
Deschutes	44.07%	42,298	49.83%	47,824	6.1%	5,858
Douglas	30.16%	15,878	62.02%	32,647	7.83%	4,118
Gilliam	26.97%	277	67.58%	694	5.45%	56
Grant	21.17%	904	72.42%	3,093	6.42%	274
Harney	22.46%	886	70.23%	2,770	7.3%	288
Hood River	60.31%	6,441	34.39%	3,672	5.3%	566
Jackson	44.17%	46,803	49.31%	52,259	6.53%	6,911
Jefferson	34.1%	3,169	59.01%	5,484	6.89%	641
Josephine	34.89%	24,078	55.48%	24,078	9.63%	4,179
Klamath	28.09%	8,420	64.1%	19,211	7.81%	2,340
Lake	19.74%	762	72.38%	2,794	7.87%	304
Lane	55.3%	103,226	38.69%	72,208	6.01%	11,217
Lincoln	53.13%	13,212	40.55%	10,084	6.32%	1,572
Linn	33.26%	19,156	59.96%	34,539	6.79%	3,904
Malheur	23.85%	2,436	68.21%	6,966	7.94%	811
Marion	41.32%	55,748	53.93%	72,752	4.75%	6,408
Morrow	27.89%	1,152	64.94%	2,682	7.17%	296
Multnomah	72.91%	279,210	21.97%	84,139	5.12%	19,593
Polk	40.14%	15,960	54.94%	21,847	4.92%	1,957
Sherman	23.56%	234	72.61%	721	3.83%	38
Tillamook	45.44%	6,152	48.74%	6,599	5.79%	789
Umatilla	31.82%	8,541	60.61%	16,269	7.56%	2,031
Union	26.74%	3,410	67.12%	8,561	6.14%	783
Wallowa	29.07%	1,253	65.81%	2,837	5.13%	221
Wasco	43.24%	5,057	50.23%	5,874	6.53%	763
Washington	54.99%	143,278	39.26%	102,282	5.75%	14,987
Wheeler	23.66%	194	70.12%	575	6.21%	51
Yamhill	39.68%	18,882	54.16%	25,773	6.16%	2,931

Counties that flipped from Democratic to Republican

- Tillamook (largest city: Tillamook)

Counties that flipped from Republican to Democratic

- Clatsop (largest city: Astoria)

==== By congressional district ====
Brown won three of five congressional districts. Pierce won the other two, including one that elected a Democrat.

District	Kate Brown	Bud Pierce	Elected Representative
1st	54%	41%	Suzanne Bonamici
2nd	38%	55%	Greg Walden
3rd	68%	26%	Earl Blumenauer
4th	47%	46%	Peter DeFazio
5th	45%	49%	Kurt Schrader
