= Libertarian Party of Oregon =

State affiliate of the Libertarian Party

- Abbreviation: LPO
- Chairperson: Sonja Feintech
- Founded: 1971; 55 years ago
- Headquarters: 7100 SW Hampton St #201; Tigard, Oregon 97223
- Membership (2021): 21,981
- Ideology: Libertarianism; Non-interventionism; Fiscal conservatism Economic liberalism Cultural liberalism Laissez-faire
- Colors: Yellow
- Senate: 0 / 30
- House of Representatives: 0 / 60
- U.S. Senate: 0 / 2
- U.S. House of Representatives: 0 / 5
- Statewide Executive Offices^{1}: 0 / 5
- Other elected officials: 1 (June 2024)

Website
- lporegon.org

The Libertarian Party of Oregon is a political party representing the national Libertarian Party in the U.S. state of Oregon. It is organized as a minor party for state election law, and recognized by the Oregon as a statewide nominating party.

It was organized in 1971 as one of the first state affiliates of the newly established national Libertarian Party which nominated Oregon party member Theodora Nathan as its vice presidential candidate at the 1972 convention. Affiliated local committees have been organized in 13 of Oregon's counties. The party ranks fourth in size behind the state's two major parties, Republican and Democratic and the Independent Party of Oregon at 0.8% of Oregon's affiliated registered voters as of 2004.

== Membership ==
As of July 2022, there are 20,865 registered Libertarians in the state of Oregon. The state party does not set a dues requirement for membership.

== History ==
1972
Theodora Nathalia Nathan, the party's nominee for Vice President of the United States, earns the first electoral vote ever cast for a woman.

1998
Richard Burke ran for Governor in a seven-way race and finished third with 2% of the vote. Bruce Knight ran for US House of Representatives district 3 in a three-way race, finishing second with 10%.

2000
Mitch Shults ran for State Treasurer, received the endorsement of the Salem Statesman Journal and got 4% of the vote in a five-way race.

2002
20 Libertarian candidates ran for office, 14 of those for the Oregon Legislative Assembly. The Libertarian candidate for Governor of Oregon that year, Tom Cox, garnered 4.6% of the vote.

2004
The number of Oregon Libertarian candidates rose to 32, nearly half of them recent converts to the party, according to Richard Burke, state executive director.

2006
Libertarian Richard Morley ran for Governor, in the party's only run for statewide office. The party fielded candidate Drake Davis in Oregon's 1st congressional district, and had candidates in 13 state legislative campaigns. None of the party's candidates was elected.

2008
Michael Jingozian seeks the national party's presidential nomination. Although unsuccessful in this bid, Jingozian is elected vice chair of the Libertarian National Committee.

2012
The Oregon Secretary of State recognized a different governing board for ballot-access purposes than the Libertarian National Committee, resulting in a split in the party. A subsequent lawsuit alleged the party's board had been infiltrated with agent provocateurs in order to disrupt organized opposition to the state's dominant political parties and that the Secretary of State's recognition of an unofficial faction was a dirty trick to weaken the state party.

2020
A Mises Caucus slate comes to dominate the state party board as part of a national grassroots movement. The party split is resolved through a series of bylaws amendments

=== Gubernatorial election results ===
Year	Gubernatorial nominee	Votes	%
1982	Paul Cleveland	27,394	2.6%
1986	No candidate		
1990	Fred Oerther	14,583	1.3%
1994	Danford P. Vander Ploeg	20,183	1.7%
1998	Richard P. Burke	20,200	1.8%
2002	Tom Cox	57,760	4.6%
2006	Richard Morley	16,798	1.2%
2010	Wes Wagner	19,048	1.3%
2014	Paul Grad	21,903	1.5%
2016	James Foster	45,191	2.4%
2018	Nick Chen	28,927	1.6%
2022	R Leon Noble		

== Organization ==
The party is governed by a State Committee consisting of statewide party officers.. A convention is held annually at which the statewide officers, who serve two-year terms, are elected. A Judicial Committee settle disputes involving the interpretation of the party’s governing documents. The convention may serve as a nominating convention during election years.

The party also recognizes County Parties and Local Affiliates organized as PACs under state election law. County parties may recommend nominations for which no nominee was chosen in the statewide primary. As of 2022, a recognized affiliate exists in Lane County and County Parties are forming in Multnomah County and Douglas County.

== State chair history ==
- 2025 - Sonja Feintech
- 2025-2025 - Joseph Christman
- 2024-2025 - Matt Rowe
- 2021-2024 - Tim Perkins
- 2016–2021 – Kyle Markley
- 2014–2016 – Lars Hedbor
- 2011–2014 – Wes Wagner, or Tim Reeves
- 2010–2011 – Jeff Weston
- 2008–2010 – Joseph Cornwell
- 2008 – H. Joe Tabor
- 2007–2008 – Wes Wagner
- 2007 – Don Smith
- 2007 – Alfredo Torrejon
- 2004–2007 – Adam Mayer
- 2003–2004 – Tom Cox
- 2001–2003 – Mitch Shults
- 1999–2001 – Adam Mayer
- 1998–1999 – Bruce Knight
- 1996–1998 – Kristopher Barrett
- 1996 – Tom Cox
- 1996 – Daniel Wilson
- 1995–1996 – Michael Wilson
- 1994–1995 – Richard Burke

== Controversy ==
=== 1996 Election ===
In 1996 former Chairperson Richard Burke led an attempt to impact the outcome of the race for Oregon's first congressional district seat by not running a Libertarian candidate after the Libertarian candidate had been credited with throwing the previous race to the Democrat. Proponents of this strategy believed that as the proposed Libertarian nominee had not raised sufficient money or built a sufficient campaign organization to run a significant campaign, the Libertarian platform would be more effectively advanced by the Republican candidate who had spent time building a relationship with the Oregon Libertarian Party. Other Libertarians thought the strategy to be tantamount to a "sell out", and an intense controversy ensued. The Libertarian candidate, Richard Johnson, narrowly won the nomination. The incumbent Democrat, Elizabeth Furse, was re-elected that fall.

=== Fiduciary responsibilities ===
Wes Wagner, Libertarian Party of Clackamas County vice-chair, sued the party and its officers in December 2006. Wagner's suit alleged that the party did not obey its own bylaws with regards to its fiduciary obligations while running up a five-figure debt to Richard Burke. The case was dismissed in Washington County Court, though it was rumored it was pending appeal, for quite some time.

=== Reeves vs. Wagner ===
In 2011, the party became internally divided in two factions following two party chairs: Tim Reeves and Wes Wagner. The March 12, 2011 annual convention only had 20 members in attendance; this fell short of a quorum as defined by the 2009 by-laws. After this meeting, the chairperson Jeff Weston resigned and the vice-chairperson, Wagner, assumed the office. He called a meeting of the "State Committee" on March 31, 2011; this meeting adopted a new constitution and bylaws, with new quorum and membership requirements. Only one member of the Reeves faction was present at this meeting and objected. On April 19, 2011, the Wagner faction met and changed the scheduled May 21, 2011 annual convention into a social event at a different location. Only the Reeves faction attended the May 21, 2011 annual convention and did not achieve a quorum. Immediately after this meeting, the Reeves faction met and elected their officers with Reeves as the state Chairperson.

In May 2011, the Reeves faction attempted to register their electioned officers but were rejected by the Secretary of State because the Secretary has previously recognized Wagner as the official chairperson. The Reeves faction sued the Wagner faction to obtain a court decision that they are the true officers of the state party. The Oregon courts issued an opinion May 21, 2013, that it does not have jurisdiction on the matter and that it should be determined by the Party's Judicial Committee. On December 12, 2018, the Court of Appeals in Oregon affirmed the lower court's decision.

== See also ==
- Pacific Green Party
