= The Source Weekly =

Alternative weekly newspaper published in Bend, Oregon

Coordinates: 44°3′17.82″N 121°19′0.23″W

- Type: Alternative weekly
- Format: Tabloid
- Owner(s): Lay It Out, Inc.
- Founder(s): Aaron and Angela Switzer
- Publisher: Aaron Switzer
- Editor: Nicole Vulcan (2016-present)
- Founded: 1997; 29 years ago
- Headquarters: Bend, Oregon
- Country: United States
- Website: bendsource.com

The Source Weekly, also known as the Source, is a free weekly newspaper published in Bend, Oregon, United States. The paper is circulated throughout Central Oregon and covers news, events and culture in the area. The paper is published in print and online every Wednesday.

== History ==
The paper was founded in 1997 by Aaron and Angela Switzer who still own and operate the weekly publication under their parent company, Lay It Out Inc. The paper is also a member of the Association of Alternative Newsmedia.

In October 2012, Bend Bulletin reported that the Source Weekly was denied the ability to publish legal notices, since they have no paying subscribers.

In October 2018, OPB reported on the “Student Voices Project,” partially put together and supported by the paper.

In 2019, the Source Weekly partnered with local crowd funding service What If We Could, to create the Central Oregon Gives Campaign, a fundraising campaign for nonprofits.

In September 2020, The Straits Times reported that the Source Weekly was participating in World News Day, a day highlighting the work of professional news outlets.

In October 2020, OPB reported on the Source Weekly’s cover that featured a local and controversial artist, who was confronting the president’s words in “knife-to-the-heart” series.

In May 2020, the Bend Bulletin and Central Oregon Daily News reported that the Source Weekly was shutting down its print operations. The paper was struggling amid the coronavirus pandemic. After a seven-week hiatus from printing, it was reported that the Source Weekly resumed normal operations.

In January 2021, KTVZ reported on the second year of Central Oregon Gives.

In June 2022, OPB reported that Avion Water filed a lawsuit against the Source Weekly after the alt-weekly made a public records request for private consumer information from the Central Oregon water supplier.

== Location ==
The Source Weekly's offices have been located at 704 NW Georgia Ave since 2000. This building is a historic building in the area, built in 1916, known as the G.W. Horner store.
