= Oregon Progressive Party =

Progressive political party in the United States

- Founded: 2007; 19 years ago
- Headquarters: 320 SW Harvey Milk Street, Suite 202, Portland, OR 97204
- Registered voters (2024): 3,671
- Ideology: Progressivism; Social democracy Environmentalism
- Political position: Center-left
- Colors: Green
- Senate: 0 / 30
- House of Representatives: 0 / 60
- U.S. Senate: 0 / 2
- U.S. House of Representatives: 0 / 5
- Statewide Executive Offices: 0 / 5

Website
- www.progparty.org

The Oregon Progressive Party (OPP) is a progressive political party in Oregon. OPP formed in 2007 as the Oregon Peace Party.

OPP supports economic justice, environmental justice, and grassroots democracy.

OPP and other state progressive parties in Vermont, California, Minnesota, Washington, and Wisconsin have endorsed national "Progressive Party" candidates for President.

== History ==
In 2007, OPP was created as the Oregon Peace Party.

On August 22, 2008, OPP was accepted as the sixth minor statewide political party in Oregon. OPP described its goals as "economic justice, human rights, environmental protection, and grassroots democracy".

In September 2009, OPP changed its name to the Oregon Progressive Party, to "more accurately reflects the party's positions" on issues besides peace, including "social justice, consumer advocacy, environmental protection, and worker's rights."

In 2019, the OPP was part of a statewide coalition that sought to "create a nonpartisan citizens panel to handle redistricting for congressional and legislative seats in Oregon following the 2020 census."

== Election results ==
OPP has fielded electoral candidates for state and federal offices. OPP candidates usually run on an OPP ballot line, sometimes with cross-endorsement from the Pacific Green Party (PGP) or Independent Party of Oregon (IPO).

No OPP candidate has yet won an election.

=== Presidential elections ===
In 2008, OPP endorsed Ralph Nader, an Independent.

In 2012, OPP endorsed Rocky Anderson of the Justice Party.

In 2016, OPP endorsed Jill Stein of the Green Party.

In 2020, OPP endorsed Dario Hunter of the Progressive Party.

In 2024, OPP endorsed Cornel West, an Independent.

=== Congressional elections ===
| Year | Candidate | Chamber | State | District | Votes | % | Result | Notes | Ref |
|---|---|---|---|---|---|---|---|---|---|
| 2024 | David Walker | House | Oregon | 3rd | 10,245 | 3.1% | Lost | ran as Independent and Progressive candidate | |
| 2022 | David Delk | House | Oregon | 3rd | 10,982 | 3.62% | Lost | ran as Progressive and Green candidate | |
| 2022 | Michael Beilstein | House | Oregon | 4th | 6,033 | 1.78% | Lost | ran as Green and Progressive candidate | |
| 2022 | Chris Henry | Senate | Oregon | At-Large | 36,883 | 1.91% | Lost | ran as Progressive candidate | |
| 2016 | David Delk | House | Oregon | 3rd | 27,978 | 7.32% | Lost | ran as Progressive and Green candidate | |
| 2012 | Steven Reynolds | House | Oregon | 1st | 15,009 | 4.52% | Lost | ran as Progressive candidate | |
| 2010 | Rick Staggenborg | Senate | Oregon | At-Large | 14,466 | 1.00% | Lost | ran as Progressive candidate | |

In 2010, OPP endorsed Democrat Peter DeFazio for Oregon's 4th Congressional District.

=== Statewide elections ===
| Year | Candidate | Office | State | Votes | % | Result | Notes | Ref |
|---|---|---|---|---|---|---|---|---|
| 2024 | Nathalie Paravicini | Secretary of State | Oregon | 76,170 | 3.6% | Lost | ran as Green and Progressive candidate | |
| 2020 | Chris Henry | Treasurer | Oregon | 99,870 | 4.42% | Lost | ran as Independent, Progressive, and Green candidate | |
| 2020 | Nathalie Paravicini | Secretary of State | Oregon | 82,211 | 3.61% | Lost | ran as Green and Progressive candidate | |
| 2018 | Chris Henry | Governor | Oregon | 11,013 | 0.59% | Lost | ran as Progressive candidate | |
| 2016 | Chris Henry | Treasurer | Oregon | 90,507 | 4.92% | Lost | ran as Progressive and Green candidate | |
| 2014 | Chris Henry | Governor | Oregon | 13,898 | 0.95% | Lost | ran as Progressive candidate | |
| 2012 | Chris Henry | Attorney General | Oregon | 28,187 | 1.73% | Lost | ran as Progressive candidate | |
| 2012 | Robert Wolfe | Secretary of State | Oregon | 21,783 | 1.29% | Lost | ran as Progressive candidate | |
| 2012 | Cameron Whitten | Treasurer | Oregon | 38,762 | 1.29% | Lost | ran as Progressive candidate | |
| 2010 | Walter Brown | Treasurer | Oregon | 38,316 | 2.35% | Lost | ran as Progressive candidate | |

In 2016, OPP endorsed Democrat Brad Avakian for Secretary of State.

In 2022, OPP's Governor candidate Nathalie Paravicini withdrew after Democrat Tina Kotek pledged to support campaign finance limits.

=== State legislature elections ===
| Year | Candidate | Office | State | District | Votes | % | Result | Notes | Ref |
|---|---|---|---|---|---|---|---|---|---|
| 2022 | Antonio Sunseri | House | Oregon | 60th | 2,837 | 10.33% | Lost | ran as Progressive candidate | |
| 2020 | Alex Polikoff | House | Oregon | 23rd | 1,770 | 4.32% | Lost | ran as Green and Progressive candidate | |
| 2018 | Cynthia Hyatt | House | Oregon | 15th | 1,539 | 4.96% | Lost | ran as Independent and Progressive candidate | |
| 2016 | James Osfink | Senate | Oregon | 21st | 10,390 | 14.68% | Lost | ran as Progressive candidate | |
| 2016 | Cynthia Hyatt | House | Oregon | 15th | 5,051 | 16.71% | Lost | ran as Progressive candidate | |
| 2016 | Sami Al-AbdRabbuh | House | Oregon | 16th | 4,934 | 16.01% | Lost | ran as Progressive candidate | |

In 2022 and 2018, OPP endorsed Democrat Jeff Golden for State Senate District 3.

== See also ==
- Politics of Oregon
- Democratic Socialists of America
- Green Party of the United States
- History of left-wing politics in the United States
- History of the socialist movement in the United States
