= 2014 Oregon gubernatorial election =

- November 4, 2014
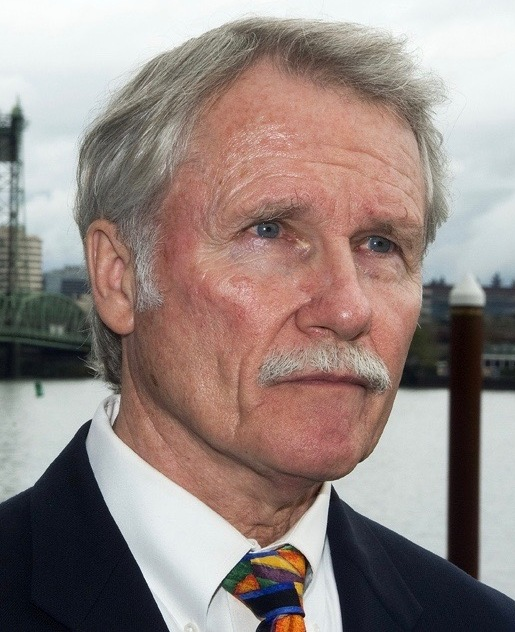

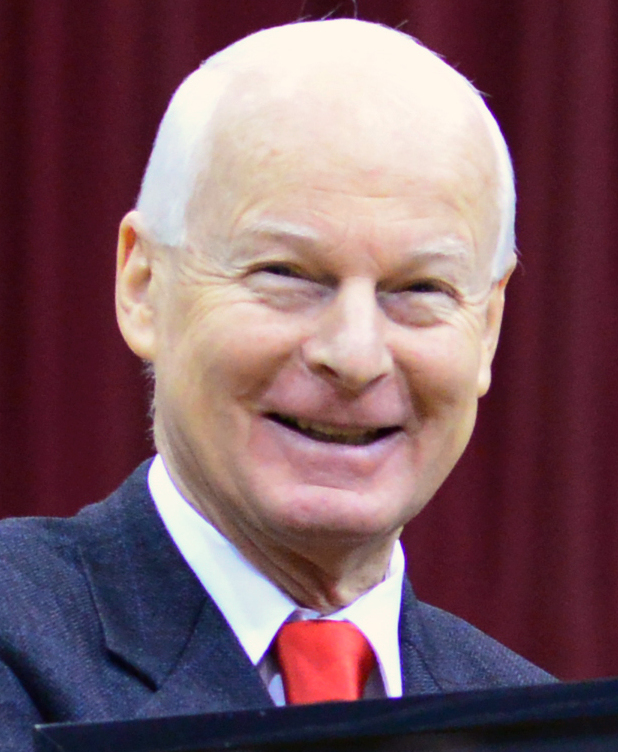
Nominee	John Kitzhaber	Dennis Richardson
Party	Democratic	Republican
Alliance	Working Families	Independent Party
Popular vote	733,230	648,542
Percentage	49.89%	44.13%
- County results Kitzhaber: 40–50% 50–60% 60–70% Richardson: 40–50% 50–60% 60–70% 70–80%
Governor before election
John Kitzhaber
Democratic
Elected Governor
John Kitzhaber
Democratic

The 2014 Oregon gubernatorial election was held on November 4, 2014, to elect the Governor of Oregon, concurrently with other elections in Oregon and across the United States.

Incumbent Democrat John Kitzhaber defeated Republican state legislator Dennis Richardson, winning his fourth overall, and second consecutive, four-year term as governor. The race was closer than expected due to recent revelations of potential ethical violations involving his fiancée, Cylvia Hayes. Most news outlets called the election in his favor by 9:00 p.m. on election night. Kitzhaber thanked his supporters for a successful race, while Richardson refused to concede due to the close tally. Four third party candidates also appeared on the ballot, with each winning less than 2% of the vote.

Kitzhaber and Richardson were nominated in the primary election on May 20, 2014. As of 2022, this is the last gubernatorial election in Oregon where Clatsop County supported the Republican candidate, the last one where Tillamook County supported the Democratic candidate, and the last time that a man was elected Governor of Oregon. If Kitzhaber had served his full term, he would have become the second longest-serving governor in U.S. history. However, he resigned on February 18, 2015.

== Background ==
Physician and then-President of the Oregon State Senate John Kitzhaber was first elected governor in 1994 and was re-elected in 1998. Term limits prevented him from running in 2002. He considered running in 2006 but decided not to; incumbent Democrat Ted Kulongoski was re-elected. In September 2009, Kitzhaber announced that he would seek a third term as governor in 2010. In May 2010, he won the Democratic primary with 65% of the vote, defeating former secretary of state of Oregon Bill Bradbury. After a close general election campaign, Kitzhaber won the election with 49% to Republican nominee Chris Dudley's 48%.

== Democratic primary ==
=== Candidates ===
==== Declared ====
- Ifeanyichukwu Chijioke Diru
- John Kitzhaber, incumbent governor

=== Results ===
Democratic primary results
Party	Candidate	Votes	%
Democratic	John Kitzhaber (incumbent)	268,654	89.0
Democratic	Ifeanyichukwu C. Diru	27,833	9.22
	write-ins	5,388	1.78
Total votes		301,875	100

== Republican primary ==
A Republican had not won a statewide race in Oregon since incumbent senator Gordon H. Smith was re-elected in 2002 and a Republican has not been elected governor since Victor G. Atiyeh was re-elected in 1982. At the annual Dorchester Conference for activists in March 2013, Oregon Republicans acknowledged the difficulties they faced. At the Conference, "the lack of activity was so pronounced that the conference's Saturday night satirical show ran a video that began with an announcer intoning, "Now we go live to the 2014 Republican governor's debate." The camera then panned over a debate stage with two empty chairs, the monotony broken only by a broom-wielding janitor." High-profile Republicans have all passed on the election and while attendees split on whether the party needed to change its policies, they agreed that the party needed to be a "big tent" again.

=== Candidates ===
==== Declared ====
- Tim Carr, businessman
- Gordon Challstrom, businessman
- Bruce Cuff, real estate broker
- Darren Karr, businessman and candidate for Governor in 2010
- Mae Rafferty, timber merchant
- Dennis Richardson, state representative

==== Withdrew ====
- Jon Justesen, businessman and rancher

==== Declined ====
- Allen Alley, businessman, former chairman of the Oregon Republican Party, nominee for Oregon State Treasurer in 2008 and candidate for Governor in 2010
- Chris Dudley, former NBA basketball player and nominee for Governor in 2010
- Bruce Hanna, state representative
- Gordon H. Smith, former U.S. Senator
- Greg Walden, U.S. Representative and Chairman of the National Republican Congressional Committee

=== Results ===
Results by county: Richardson: 40–50%; 50–60%; 60–70%; 70–80%

Republican primary results
Party	Candidate	Votes	%
Republican	Dennis Richardson	163,695	65.86
Republican	Gordon Challstrom	24,693	9.93
Republican	Bruce Cuff	23,912	9.62
Republican	Mae Rafferty	16,920	6.8
Republican	Tim Carr	14,847	5.97
Republican	Darren Karr	2,474	1.0
	write-ins	2,011	0.8
Total votes		248,552	100

== Third parties ==
=== Candidates ===
==== Declared ====
- Aaron Auer (Constitution Party)
- Paul Grad (Libertarian Party)
- Chris Henry (Oregon Progressive Party)
- Jason Levin (Pacific Green Party)

Additionally, under Oregon's Electoral fusion law, Democratic nominee John Kitzhaber was nominated by the Working Families Party of Oregon, and Republican nominee Dennis Richardson was nominated by the Independent Party of Oregon.

== General election ==
=== Debates ===
- Complete video of debate, September 26, 2014
- Complete video of debate, October 14, 2014
- Complete video of debate, October 20, 2014

=== Predictions ===
Source	Ranking	As of
The Cook Political Report	Likely D	November 3, 2014
Sabato's Crystal Ball	Likely D	November 3, 2014
Rothenberg Political Report	Safe D	November 3, 2014
Real Clear Politics	Lean D	November 3, 2014

=== Polling ===
Poll source	Date(s) administered	Sample size	Margin of error	John Kitzhaber (D)	Dennis Richardson (R)	Other	Undecided
Elway Research	October 26–27, 2014	403	± 5%	45%	38%	2%	9%
SurveyUSA	October 23–27, 2014	552	± 4.3%	50%	40%	6%	5%
CBS News/NYT/YouGov	October 16–23, 2014	1,421	± 4%	48%	42%	1%	10%
SurveyUSA	October 16–19, 2014	561	± 4.2%	51%	38%	6%	6%
DHM Research	October 2014	?	± 4.3%	50%	29%	6%	15%
CBS News/NYT/YouGov	September 20–October 1, 2014	1,508	± 3%	49%	42%	0%	8%
SurveyUSA	September 22–24, 2014	568	± 4.2%	50%	38%	5%	8%
Rasmussen Reports	September 2–3, 2014	750	± 4%	48%	38%	4%	10%
CBS News/NYT/YouGov	August 18–September 2, 2014	1,541	± 4%	48%	42%	1%	8%
Moore Information^	August 5–9, 2014	500	± 4%	45%	41%	—	13%
SurveyUSA	August 1–5, 2014	564	± 4.2%	48%	36%	7%	9%
CBS News/NYT/YouGov	July 5–24, 2014	2,082	± 2.6%	52%	42%	1%	5%
On Message, Inc.^	June 22–24, 2014	600	± 4%	42%	38%	—	16%
SurveyUSA	June 5–9, 2014	560	± 4.2%	48%	35%	10%	7%
Public Policy Polling	May 22–27, 2014	956	± 3.2%	49%	36%	—	15%
DHM Research	May 2014	400	± 4.9%	48%	36%	—	16%
Harper Polling	April 1–2, 2014	670	± 3.91%	46%	43%	—	11%

- ^ Internal poll for Dennis Richardson campaign
Hypothetical polling

Poll source	Date(s) administered	Sample size	Margin of error	John Kitzhaber (D)	Allen Alley (R)	Other	Undecided
Public Policy Polling	December 3–5, 2012	614	± 4%	52%	37%	—	12%
Public Policy Polling	June 21–24, 2012	686	± 3.7%	46%	36%	—	18%

Poll source	Date(s) administered	Sample size	Margin of error	John Kitzhaber (D)	Jason Atkinson (R)	Other	Undecided
Public Policy Polling	June 21–24, 2012	686	± 3.7%	45%	30%	—	24%

Poll source	Date(s) administered	Sample size	Margin of error	John Kitzhaber (D)	Bruce Hanna (R)	Other	Undecided
Public Policy Polling	December 3–5, 2012	614	± 4%	52%	33%	—	15%
Public Policy Polling	June 21–24, 2012	686	± 3.7%	46%	33%	—	21%

Poll source	Date(s) administered	Sample size	Margin of error	John Kitzhaber (D)	Gordon H. Smith (R)	Other	Undecided
Public Policy Polling	December 3–5, 2012	614	± 4%	47%	42%	—	11%

Poll source	Date(s) administered	Sample size	Margin of error	John Kitzhaber (D)	Bruce Starr (R)	Other	Undecided
Public Policy Polling	December 3–5, 2012	614	± 4%	53%	31%	—	16%

Poll source	Date(s) administered	Sample size	Margin of error	John Kitzhaber (D)	Greg Walden (R)	Other	Undecided
Public Policy Polling	December 3–5, 2012	614	± 4%	49%	40%	—	11%
Public Policy Polling	June 21–24, 2012	686	± 3.7%	42%	41%	—	17%

=== Results ===
Oregon gubernatorial election, 2014
Party	Candidate	Votes	%	±%
Democratic	John Kitzhaber (incumbent)	733,230	49.89%	+0.60%
Republican	Dennis Richardson	648,542	44.13%	−3.63%
Pacific Green	Jason Levin	29,561	2.01%	N/A
Libertarian	Paul Grad	21,903	1.49%	+0.18%
Constitution	Aaron Auer	15,929	1.08%	N/A
Progressive	Chris Henry	13,898	0.95%	N/A
Write-in		6,654	0.45%	+0.23%
Total votes		1,469,717	100.00%	N/A
Democratic hold				

==== By county ====
County	John Kitzhaber Democratic		Dennis Richardson Republican		Various candidates Other parties		Margin		Total votes cast
County	#	%	#	%	#	%	#	%	Total votes cast
Baker	1,951	27.4%	4,842	68.0%	323	4.5%	-2,891	-40.6%	7,116
Benton	21,694	58.5%	13,245	35.7%	2,160	5.8%	8,449	22.8%	37,009
Clackamas	70,071	45.2%	77,059	49.7%	7,867	5.1%	-6,988	-4.5%	154,997
Clatsop	6,449	45.6%	6,550	46.3%	1,138	8.1%	-101	-0.7%	19,835
Columbia	8,477	42.7%	9,887	49.8%	1,471	7.4%	-1,410	-7.1%	19,835
Coos	10,120	42.3%	12,260	51.2%	1,546	6.5%	-2,140	-8.9%	23,926
Crook	2,601	29.4%	5,753	64.9%	508	5.8%	-3,152	-35.5%	8,862
Curry	3,946	40.7%	5,211	53.8%	535	5.5%	-1,265	-13.1%	9,692
Deschutes	31,518	45.6%	34,104	49.4%	3,441	5.0%	-2,586	-3.8%	69,063
Douglas	13,829	33.5%	24,553	59.5%	2,899	7.1%	-10,724	-26.0%	41,281
Gilliam	284	32.3%	546	62.2%	48	5.5%	-262	-29.9%	878
Grant	834	25.5%	2,294	70.2%	141	4.5%	-1,460	-44.7%	3,269
Harney	724	24.5%	2,083	70.4%	151	5.0%	-1,359	-45.9%	2,958
Hood River	4,875	58.8%	2,988	36.0%	426	5.1%	1,887	22.8%	8,289
Jackson	35,235	42.7%	43,498	52.7%	3,855	4.7%	-8,263	-10.0%	82,588
Jefferson	2,333	34.2%	4,048	59.4%	432	6.3%	-1,715	-25.2%	6,813
Josephine	12,032	35.4%	19,926	58.7%	2,002	5.9%	-7,894	-24.3%	33,960
Klamath	6,416	28.1%	15,155	66.4%	1,265	5.6%	-8,739	-38.3%	22,836
Lake	736	23.1%	2,310	72.4%	145	4.5%	-1,574	-49.3%	3,191
Lane	82,132	57.1%	53,156	37.0%	8,535	5.9%	28,976	20.1%	143,823
Lincoln	10,469	54.1%	7,609	39.3%	1,289	6.7%	2,860	14.8%	19,367
Linn	14,890	34.5%	25,463	59.0%	2,831	6.6%	-10,573	-24.5%	43,184
Malheur	1,904	25.2%	5,226	69.2%	418	5.5%	-3,322	-44.0%	7,548
Marion	41,858	41.3%	53,377	52.7%	6,021	5.9%	-11,519	-11.4%	101,256
Morrow	870	27.8%	2,065	65.9%	198	6.3%	-1,195	-38.1%	3,133
Multnomah	202,617	69.9%	66,780	23.1%	20,273	7.0%	135,837	46.8%	289,670
Polk	12,375	41.4%	15,809	52.9%	1,686	5.7%	-3,434	-11.5%	29,870
Sherman	252	28.3%	596	66.9%	43	4.8%	-344	-38.6%	891
Tillamook	4,907	46.7%	4,895	46.6%	706	6.7%	12	0.1%	10,508
Umatilla	5,517	29.3%	12,337	65.5%	994	5.3%	-6,820	-36.2%	18,848
Union	3,087	30.4%	6,526	64.3%	536	5.3%	-3,439	-33.9%	10,149
Wallowa	1,008	27.9%	2,474	68.5%	129	3.6%	-1,466	-40.6%	3,611
Wasco	3,959	43.3%	4,557	49.8%	629	6.9%	-598	-6.5%	9,145
Washington	98,203	51.4%	81,484	42.7%	11,185	5.9%	16,719	8.7%	190,872
Wheeler	203	29.6%	440	64.2%	42	5.2%	-237	-34.6%	685
Yamhill	14,854	40.8%	19,436	53.4%	2,077	5.7%	-4,582	-12.6%	36,367
Total	733,230	49.9%	648,542	44.1%	87,945	6.0%	84,688	5.8%	1,469,717

Counties that flipped from Republican to Democratic

- Tillamook (largest city: Tillamook)

Counties that flipped from Democratic to Republican

- Clatsop (largest city: Astoria)

== See also ==
- 2014 United States elections
- United States Senate election in Oregon, 2014
