= Pavel Goberman =

American political candidate

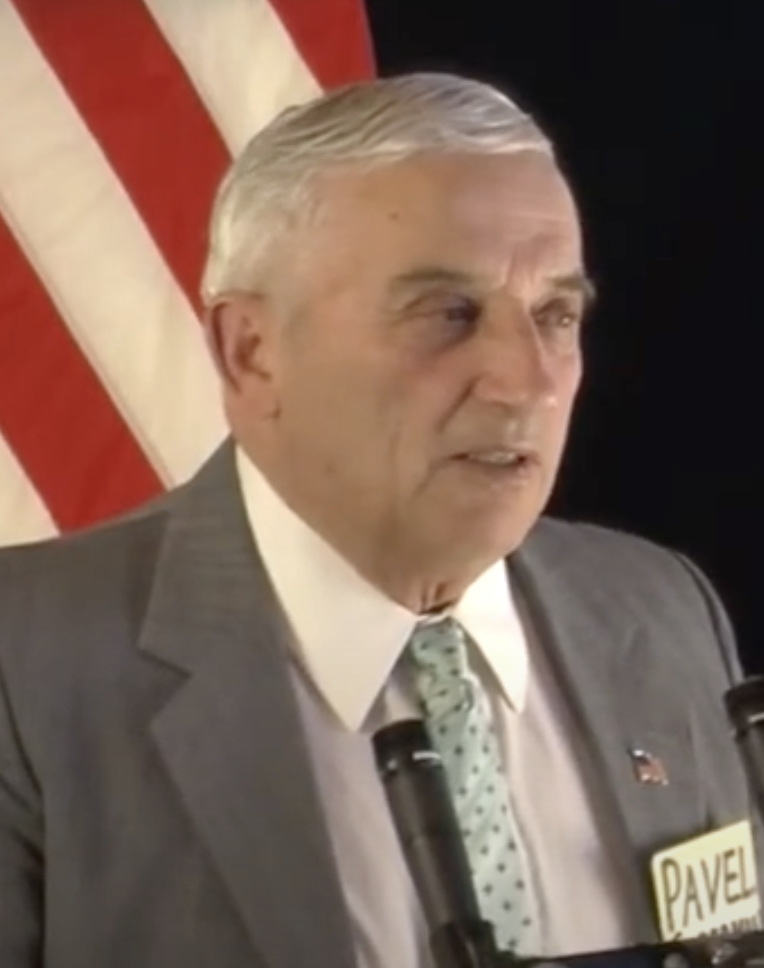

Personal details
- Born: October 16, 1937 (age 89) Crimea, Russian Soviet Federative Socialist Republic, Soviet Union
- Party: Various; Democratic (2006, 2008, 2010, 2014–2018); Republican (2000, 2004, 2011); Libertarian (2000)
- Children: 1
- Education: Lenin All-Union Academy of Agricultural Sciences
- Profession: Fitness instructor

Pavel Goberman (born October 16, 1937) is a Russian-American fitness advocate, alternative medicine promoter, and perennial candidate for public office.

Born in the Soviet Union, Goberman emigrated to the United States in 1980, eventually settling in the Portland, Oregon, metropolitan area. While there, he worked for TriMet, and was eventually fired, an event he viewed as unjust and which fueled a quixotic political career. Goberman ran multiple times for public office ranging from the United States Senate to local school boards, using his campaigns as an avenue to air grievances against his political opponents and to promote his personal fitness program.

== Early life and career ==
Goberman was born in Crimea, at the time part of the Soviet Union, in 1937. His parents, who were Russian Jews, were killed by the Nazis in 1941 following Operation Barbarossa. After this, Goberman grew up in a Moscow orphanage. He served in the Soviet Army from 1956 to 1959 as a machinist, an experience he credited with instilling a passion for public service.

In the Soviet Union, Goberman attended the Lenin All-Union Academy of Agricultural Sciences, receiving a degree in agriculture and beekeeping.

Goberman emigrated from the USSR to the United States in May 1980, living in Minnesota and Seattle before settling in Beaverton, Oregon. He attended the University of Minnesota for a time, but did not graduate, and later took classes at Portland State University.

=== Fitness ===
Goberman is a fitness instructor and the founder of the "Get Energized!" fitness program, described as a "method of physical and mental fitness which involves relaxation, self-massage, and exercise." He is the author of a book by the same title. Media outlets have described him as a "fitness guru", a label Goberman employs himself. Goberman has used his political campaigns as a platform to promote his fitness practices, which he claims will drastically increase the health of the general population if practiced, prevent cancer, and slow down aging. Goberman frequently appeared before local government bodies such as the Portland City Council to encourage them to adopt his routines and criticize them for failing to doing as such. Goberman argued widespread use of his fitness video entitled Get Fit! could be implemented as a government policy in order to reduce healthcare spending. The video, filmed in the 1990s, promotes self-facial massage, use of exercise bands, and a significant amount of jump roping. Goberman's regimen additionally advocates daily swimming, stretching, and pull-ups.

On his website, Goberman claimed that he could teach how to produce "microelectricity in the body" which would kill cancer cells and prevent cancer, especially breast cancer.

Goberman has filed multiple lawsuits against public officials, political organizations, and news and television outlets, several of which in 2014 a judge dismissed as "frivolous and repetitive." In addition, he sued his former employer, TriMet, for employment discrimination after being fired.

== Political career ==
Goberman first ran for office in 2000, entering the Republican primary for Oregon House of Representatives in the 8th district. He lost the nomination to Lisa Michaels, receiving 16.9% of the vote. Later that year, he was the Libertarian nominee for Oregon State Senate from the 4th district, which at the time was based in Beaverton. He lost to Democrat Ryan Deckert, finishing a distant third with 2.2% of the vote.

In 2002, Goberman ran for Oregon Commissioner of Labor and Industries, a nonpartisan office, receiving 5.8% of the vote.

Goberman ran in the Republican primary in the 2004 United States Senate election in Oregon and finished in sixth and last place with 5.1% of the vote.

In 2005, Goberman ran for Beaverton School District Board. He placed fifth of five candidates, obtaining 7.8% of the vote. Goberman campaigned on improving academic performance and increasing discipline in schools, as well as implementing his fitness regimen in physical education classes.

In 2006, he ran for Oregon's 1st congressional district as a Democrat, placing fourth and last with 2.5% of the vote.

Goberman again ran for U.S. Senate in 2008, placing fifth out of six candidates and receiving 2.2% of the vote in the May Democratic primary, losing to then-State Senator Jeff Merkley, who went on to win the general election.

Later in 2008, Goberman ran for the post of Commissioner of Labor and Industries once again. In what was by far his best performance of his political career, he obtained 184,919 votes, finishing in second place with 18% behind winner Brad Avakian.

In the 2010 U.S. Senate election, he challenged incumbent Ron Wyden in the Democratic primary, finishing third out of three candidates with 2.7% of the vote.

After incumbent 1st District Congressman David Wu resigned in 2011, Goberman ran in the subsequent special election to fill the seat. He did not advance past the Republican primary, finishing fourth out of five candidates and obtaining 3.0% of the vote. Primary winner Rob Cornilles would go on to lose the special general election to Democrat Suzanne Bonamici.

In 2012, Goberman ran for Mayor of Beaverton, Oregon. In the nonpartisan race, he finished a distant third, receiving 3.6% of the vote.

Goberman would again challenge Jeff Merkley in the 2014 U.S. Senate election, finishing third and last in the Democratic primary with 2.9% of the vote.

In 2015, Goberman ran for Seattle City Council for the 1st district. He placed 9th out of 9 candidates in the nonpartisan primary with 1.1% of the vote. During the campaign, he was reported as living in the Highland Park neighborhood of Seattle.

Goberman filed to run in the 2018 United States Senate election in Texas as a Democrat, but dropped out prior to the election. In preparation for the run, he attempted to file to register to vote in Texas while keeping his address confidential; the request was rejected.

In February 2018, Goberman spoke at a Dallas City Council meeting and was listed as residing at a Dallas address.

=== Views and style ===
Owing to his frequent campaigns for every level of office in Oregon, he was described in 2014 as a "fixture in the local political process." He is viewed as a perennial candidate, running under various partisan labels as well as in nonpartisan elections.

Goberman, who labels himself as a "wise man" and as "incorruptible," always refused to take campaign contributions, and has often campaigned on that theme. His heavy Russian accent and broken English were an oft-noted feature of his campaigns. He often contrasted his own self-described fitness with the perceived weakness of his political opponents at similar or younger ages. For example, in a 2007 email to The Oregonian, he wrote:

Governor Kulongoski: 67 - cripple. Me: 70 - excellent health, a lot of energy: do 55 push ups in 1-min, do 10 pull ups, during swimming use a butterfly strokes and etc. And ....ready to fight corrupted media.

Goberman repeatedly threatened to put a curse upon the nation or upon his perceived opponents should he fail to win office. He frequently claimed that news outlets failing to interview him, include him in debates, or elected officials neglecting to place him in voters' pamphlets constituted a "violation and rape of the Constitution". In a 2006 email to Willamette Week regarding his candidacy for Congress, he wrote:

I do NOT respect this newspaper. And I do NOT need your endorsement.

Goberman's website, GetEnergized.com, included a lengthy section listing, criticizing and threatening his personal and political opponents.

Goberman's campaigns focused on a number of eclectic themes. He supported the legalization of dueling, an expansion of the death penalty, making prisoners perform hard labor while incarcerated, mandating English as the official language of the United States, and cracking down on institutions, such as Oregon Public Broadcasting, which he perceived as having slighted him. Goberman has claimed his book, Get Energized, is worthy of the Nobel Prize in Literature. He has called the government of Oregon a "a gang of political prostitutes, a gang of not convicted yet criminals, a Devil, the Beast 666 and Satan at work."

== Personal life ==
Goberman is a widower with a daughter who lives in Europe.

In his filing to run for Congress in 2011, Goberman said he resided in Beaverton, Oregon, described his occupation as "retired and have own fitness business; help women prevent mastectomy and etc.", and listed a wide variety of previous careers, including as a beekeeper, mechanic, machinist, welder, firefighter, and truck driver. He also claimed to have given himself a PhD in physical education.
