= 2022 United States Senate election in Oregon =

- November 8, 2022
- Turnout: 66.91% ▼
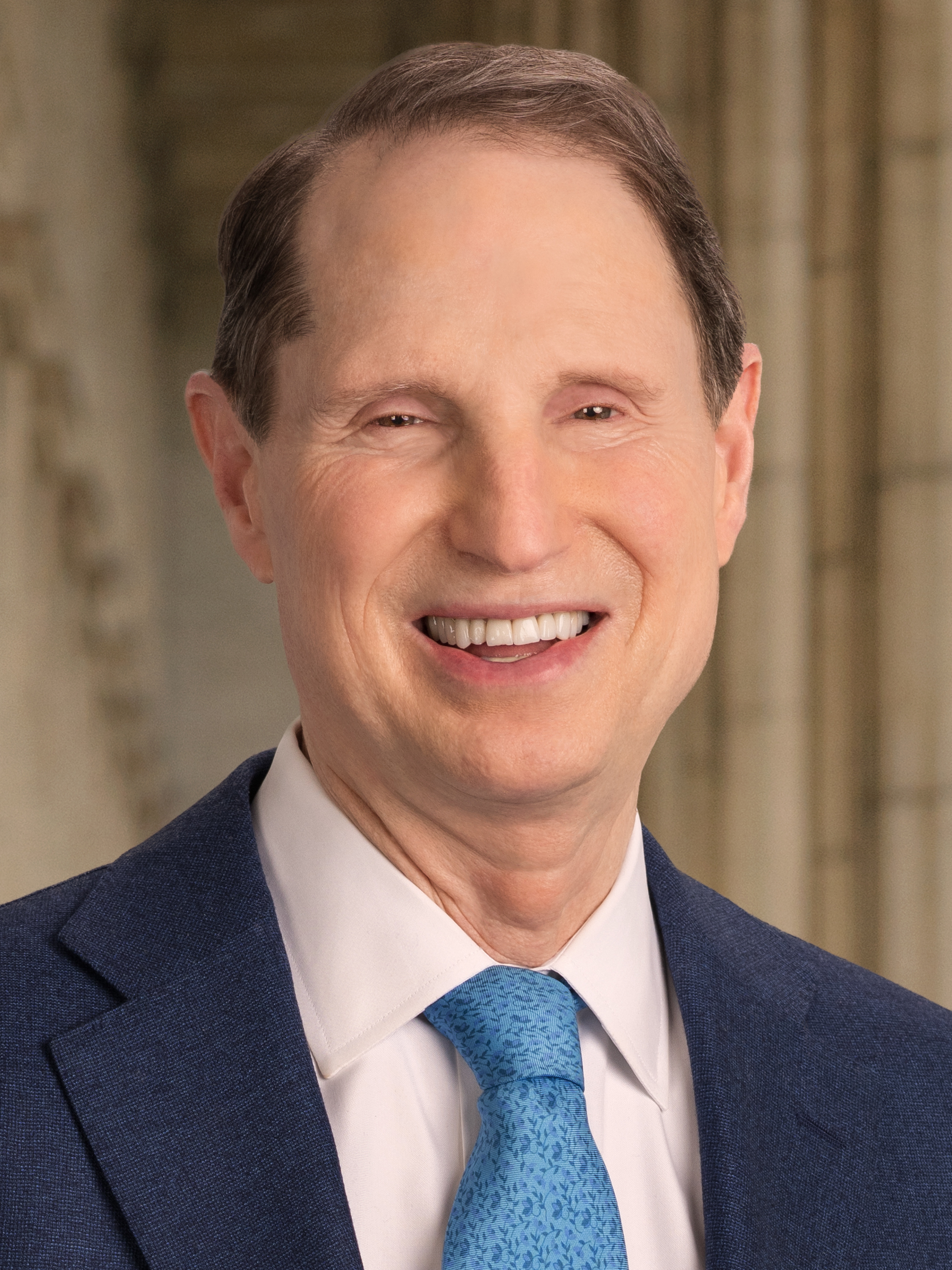

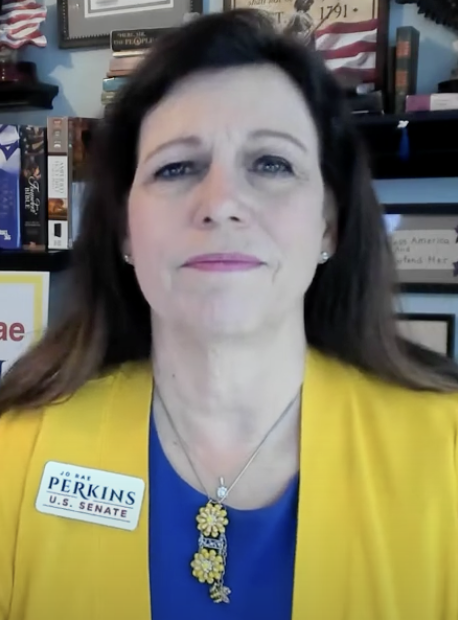
Nominee	Ron Wyden	Jo Rae Perkins
Party	Democratic	Republican
Alliance	Independent Party	Constitution
Popular vote	1,076,424	788,991
Percentage	55.83%	40.92%
- Wyden: 40–50% 50–60% 60–70% 70–80% Perkins: 40–50% 50–60% 60–70% 70–80%
U.S. senator before election
Ron Wyden
Democratic
Elected U.S. Senator
Ron Wyden
Democratic

The 2022 United States Senate election in Oregon was held on November 8, 2022, to elect a member of the United States Senate to represent the state of Oregon. Incumbent Democratic U.S. Senator Ron Wyden, who was first elected in a 1996 special election, ran for a fifth full term. Jo Rae Perkins, who unsuccessfully ran for Oregon's other Senate seat in 2020, won the Republican primary with 33.3% of the vote. The four candidates filing with the Oregon secretary of state for this election included Chris Henry of the Oregon Progressive Party and Dan Pulju of the Pacific Green Party.

Wyden ultimately won the election with 55.8% of the statewide vote. This was the first time since 1996 that none of the following counties went Democratic in a Senate Class III election: Gilliam, Jackson, Marion, Polk, Wasco, and Yamhill. It was also the first time Columbia County supported the Republican nominee in this seat since 1986.

== Democratic primary ==
=== Candidates ===
==== Nominee ====
- Ron Wyden, incumbent U.S. senator (1996–present)

==== Eliminated in primary ====
- Will Barlow, former Electrical and Elevator Board member
- Brent Thompson

=== Endorsements ===
Ron Wyden

Organizations

- Feminist Majority PAC
- Giffords
- Jewish Dems
- League of Conservation Voters
- Natural Resources Defense Council
- Population Connection Action Fund
- Pro-Israel America
- Sierra Club

Unions

- Oregon Education Association PAC
- Service Employees International Union (SEIU) - Oregon State Council

=== Results ===
Results by county Wyden: 70–80%; 80–90%; 90–100%

Democratic primary results
Party	Candidate	Votes	%
Democratic	Ron Wyden (incumbent)	439,665	89.38%
Democratic	William E. Barlow III	35,025	7.12%
Democratic	Brent Thompson	17,197	3.50%
Total votes		491,887	100.0%

== Republican primary ==
=== Candidates ===
==== Nominee ====
- Jo Rae Perkins, former chair of the Linn County Republican Party and nominee for the U.S. Senate in 2020

==== Eliminated in primary ====
- Jason Beebe, mayor of Prineville
- Christopher C. Christensen
- Robert M. Fleming
- Darin Harbick, business owner
- Sam Palmer, Grant County commissioner
- Ibra A. Taher, philosopher, peace activist and Pacific Green nominee for U.S. Senate in 2020

==== Declined ====
- Alek Skarlatos, former Oregon National Guard soldier and nominee for Oregon's 4th congressional district in 2020 (running for U.S. House)

=== Endorsements ===
Jo Rae Perkins

Individuals

- Lars Larson, conservative talk show host

=== Results ===
Results by county Perkins: 20–30%; 30–40%; 40–50%; Harbick: 20–30%; 30–40%; 50–60%; Palmer: 20–30%; 30–40%; 60–70%; 70–80%; Beebe: 40–50%

Republican primary results
Party	Candidate	Votes	%
Republican	Jo Rae Perkins	115,701	33.32%
Republican	Darin Harbick	107,506	30.96%
Republican	Sam Palmer	42,703	12.30%
Republican	Jason Beebe	39,456	11.36%
Republican	Christopher C. Christensen	28,433	8.19%
Republican	Robert M. Fleming	6,821	1.96%
Republican	Ibra A. Taher	6,659	1.92%
Total votes		347,279	100.0%

== Libertarian primary ==
The Libertarian primary was held on June 17, 2022, a month after the major party primaries.

=== Candidates ===
==== Nominee ====
- John R Newton, brewer

==== Eliminated in primary ====
- Will Hobson of Hood River, state leader of the Mises Caucus

== Independents ==
=== Candidates ===
==== Declared ====
- Thomas Verde, contract specialist

== Pacific Green Party ==
=== Candidates ===
==== Nominee ====
- Dan Pulju

== General election ==
=== Predictions ===
Source	Ranking	As of
The Cook Political Report	Solid D	November 19, 2021
Inside Elections	Solid D	January 7, 2022
Sabato's Crystal Ball	Safe D	November 3, 2021
Politico	Solid D	June 8, 2022
RCP	Safe D	January 10, 2022
Fox News	Solid D	May 12, 2022
DDHQ	Solid D	July 20, 2022
538	Solid D	June 30, 2022
The Economist	Safe D	September 7, 2022

=== Post-primary endorsements ===
Ron Wyden (D)

Executive branch officials

- Joe Biden, 46th president of the United States (2021–2025)

U.S. senators

- Bernie Sanders, U.S. senator from Vermont
- Gordon H. Smith, former U.S. senator from Oregon (Republican)

Organizations

- American Israel Public Affairs Committee
- The Mother PAC
- Planned Parenthood Action Fund

Labor unions

- Oregon AFL–CIO

Newspapers

- The Corvallis Advocate
- News-Register
- Portland Tribune

=== Polling ===
Poll source	Date(s) administered	Sample size (Note: Key: A – all adults RV – registered voters LV – likely voters V – unclear)	Margin of error	Ron Wyden (D)	Jo Rae Perkins (R)	Other	Undecided
Data for Progress (D)	November 1–6, 2022	1,393 (LV)	± 3.0%	56%	42%	2% (Note: Henry (P) with 1%; Pulju (PG) with 1%)	–
Emerson College	October 31 – November 1, 2022	975 (LV)	± 3.1%	51%	34%	7% (Note: Henry (P) with 3%; Pulju (PG) with 2%; "Someone else" with 3%)	8%
Data for Progress (D)	October 16–18, 2022	1,021 (LV)	± 3.0%	51%	40%	3% (Note: Henry (P) with 2%; Pulju (PG) with 1%)	7%
Civiqs	October 15–18, 2022	804 (LV)	± 4.3%	55%	38%	5% (Note: "Someone else" with 5%)	2%
Emerson College	September 29 – October 1, 2022	796 (LV)	± 3.4%	51%	32%	8% (Note: "Someone else" with 8%)	9%

=== Results ===
2022 United States Senate election in Oregon
Party	Candidate	Votes	%	±%
Democratic	Ron Wyden (incumbent)	1,076,424	55.83%	−0.77%
Republican	Jo Rae Perkins	788,991	40.92%	+7.57%
Progressive	Chris Henry	36,883	1.91%	N/A
Pacific Green	Dan Pulju	23,454	1.22%	−1.28%
Write-in		2,197	0.11%	+0.01%
Total votes		1,927,949	100.00%	N/A
Democratic hold				

==== By county ====
By county

County	Ron Wyden Democratic		Jo Rae Perkins Republican		Various candidates Other parties		Margin		Total votes
County	#	%	#	%	#	%	#	%	Total votes
Baker	2,531	29.34	5,902	68.42	193	2.24	-3,371	-39.08	8,626
Benton	29,953	66.38	13,407	29.71	1,766	3.91	16,546	36.67	45,126
Clackamas	112,387	52.90	94,232	44.36	5,829	2.74	18,155	8.55	212,448
Clatsop	11,149	56.06	8,135	40.90	605	3.04	3,014	15.15	19,889
Columbia	11,810	43.75	14,221	52.68	965	3.57	-2,411	-8.93	26,996
Coos	12,560	40.37	17,595	56.56	955	3.07	-5,035	-16.18	31,110
Crook	3,730	26.83	9,899	71.21	273	1.96	-6,169	-44.37	13,902
Curry	5,220	41.41	7,049	55.92	337	2.67	-1,829	-14.51	12,606
Deschutes	57,865	53.63	46,886	43.46	3,142	2.91	10,979	10.18	107,893
Douglas	16,935	32.05	34,523	65.33	1,382	2.62	-17,588	-33.29	52,840
Gilliam	339	34.59	626	63.88	15	1.53	-287	-29.29	980
Grant	1,066	25.91	2,935	71.34	113	2.75	-1,869	-45.43	4,114
Harney	972	25.96	2,683	71.66	89	2.38	-1,711	-45.70	3,744
Hood River	7,002	65.27	3,377	31.48	348	3.24	3,625	33.79	10,727
Jackson	48,071	46.37	52,714	50.85	2,879	2.78	-4,643	-4.48	103,664
Jefferson	3,597	36.33	6,083	61.44	220	2.22	-2,486	-25.11	9,900
Josephine	15,396	36.24	25,948	61.08	1,138	2.68	-10,552	-24.84	42,482
Klamath	8,918	29.97	20,088	67.50	755	2.54	-11,170	-37.53	29,761
Lake	858	21.73	2,999	75.96	91	2.30	-2,141	-54.23	3,948
Lane	110,577	60.74	65,606	36.04	5,870	3.22	44,971	24.70	182,053
Lincoln	15,283	58.51	10,011	38.33	826	3.16	5,272	20.18	26,120
Linn	22,041	36.28	36,740	60.48	1,971	3.24	-14,699	-24.20	60,752
Malheur	2,336	25.78	6,469	71.38	258	2.85	-4,133	-45.60	9,063
Marion	60,614	46.45	65,606	50.27	4,276	3.28	-4,992	-3.83	130,496
Morrow	1,159	28.68	2,786	68.94	96	2.38	-1,627	-40.26	4,041
Multnomah	286,167	78.84	62,324	17.17	14,462	3.98	223,843	61.67	362,953
Polk	18,920	46.20	20,746	50.65	1,290	3.15	-1,826	-4.46	40,956
Sherman	253	24.85	754	74.07	11	1.08	-501	-49.21	1,018
Tillamook	7,176	49.64	6,909	47.79	372	2.57	267	1.85	14,457
Umatilla	7,718	31.07	16,502	66.44	618	2.49	-8,784	-35.37	24,838
Union	3,902	31.50	8,216	66.32	270	2.18	-4,314	-34.82	12,388
Wallowa	1,521	33.52	2,917	64.29	99	2.18	-1,396	-30.77	4,537
Wasco	5,382	47.65	5,562	49.24	351	3.11	-180	-1.59	11,295
Washington	160,858	63.57	83,146	32.86	9,055	3.58	77,712	30.71	253,059
Wheeler	237	29.37	546	67.66	24	2.97	-309	-38.29	807
Yamhill	21,921	45.33	24,849	51.38	1,590	3.29	-2,928	-6.05	48,360
Totals	1,076,424	55.83	788,991	40.92	62,534	3.24	287,433	14.91	1,927,949

Counties that flipped from Democratic to Republican

- Columbia (largest municipality: St. Helens)
- Gilliam (largest municipality: Condon)
- Jackson (largest municipality: Medford)
- Jefferson (largest municipality: Madras)
- Marion (largest municipality: Salem)
- Polk (largest municipality: West Salem)
- Wasco (largest municipality: The Dalles)
- Yamhill (largest municipality: McMinnville)

==== By congressional district ====
Wyden won five of six congressional districts, including one that elected a Republican.

District	Wyden	Perkins	Representative
1st	66%	30%	Suzanne Bonamici
2nd	37%	60%	Cliff Bentz
3rd	71%	25%	Earl Blumenauer
4th	55%	41%	Peter DeFazio (117th Congress)
4th	55%	41%	Val Hoyle (118th Congress)
5th	52%	45%	Kurt Schrader (117th Congress)
5th	52%	45%	Lori Chavez-DeRemer (118th Congress)
6th	53%	44%	Andrea Salinas

== See also ==
- 2022 United States Senate elections
- 2022 Oregon elections
