= 1998 United States Senate election in Oregon =

- November 3, 1998
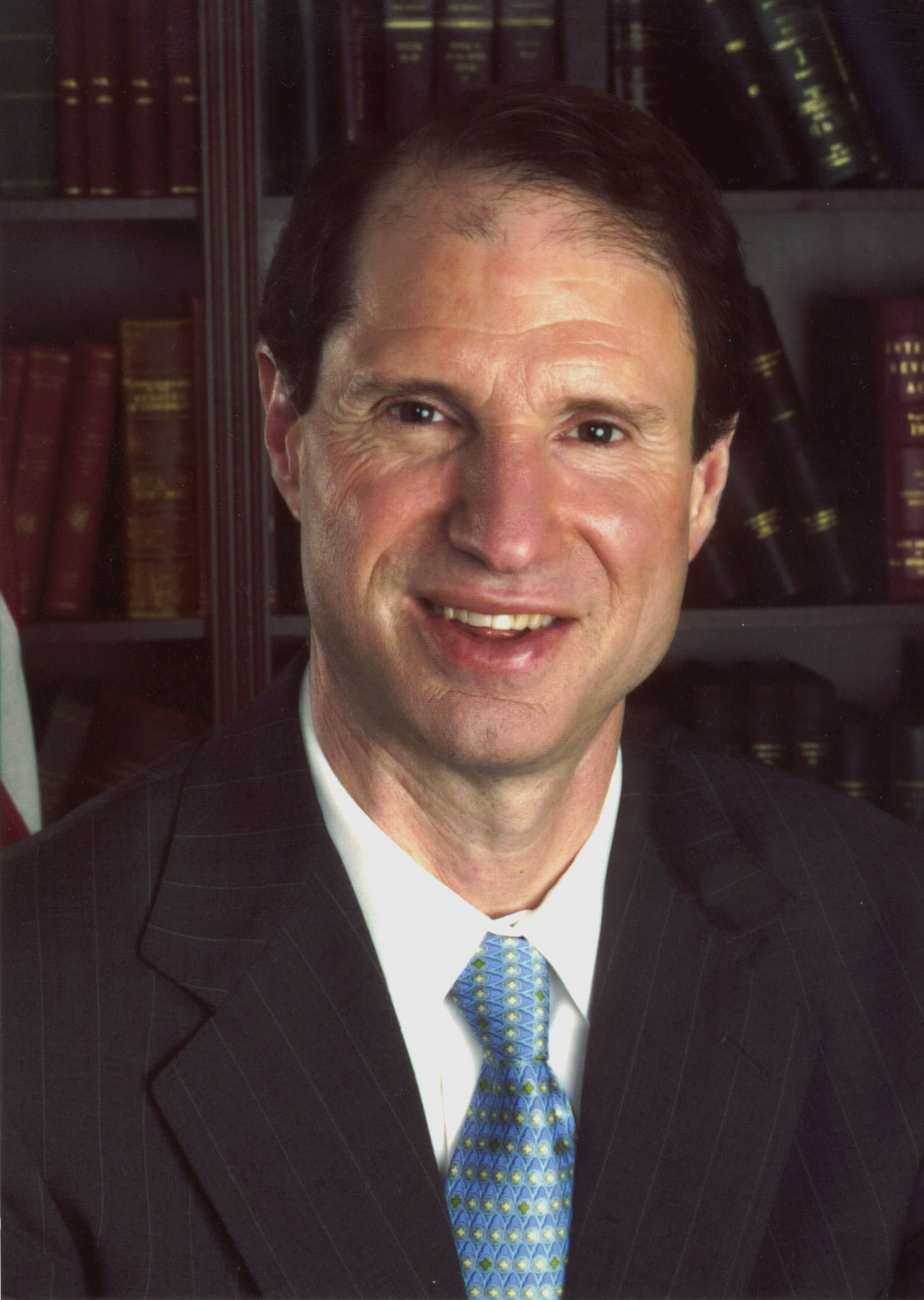

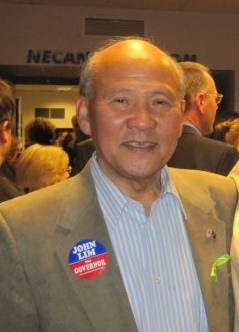
Nominee	Ron Wyden	John Lim
Party	Democratic	Republican
Popular vote	682,425	377,739
Percentage	61.05%	33.79%
- County results Wyden: 40–50% 50–60% 60–70% 70–80% Lim: 50–60%
U.S. senator before election
Ron Wyden
Democratic
Elected U.S. Senator
Ron Wyden
Democratic

The 1998 United States Senate election in Oregon was held on November 3, 1998. Incumbent Democratic U.S. Senator Ron Wyden won re-election to his first full term, defeating Republican nominee John Lim, a state senator in a landslide (Lim only carried Malheur County). As of 2022, this is the last time Grant County and Harney County have supported a Democrat in a U.S. Senate election.

== Democratic nomination ==
- John Sweeney, retired city parks worker
- Ron Wyden, incumbent U.S. Senator

=== Results ===
Results by county Wyden: 80–90%; >90%

Oregon Democratic U.S. Senate primary results
Party	Candidate	Votes	%
Democratic	Ronald Wyden (Incumbent)	283,654	91.51%
Democratic	John Sweeney	25,456	8.21%
Democratic	Write-ins	853	0.28%
Total votes		309,963	100.00%

== Republican nomination ==
- Valentine Christian, from Salem
- John Lim, State Senator from Gresham and candidate for Governor in 1990
- John Michael Fitzpatrick, from Lake Oswego

=== Results ===
Results by county Lim: 40–50%; 50–60%; 60–70%; 70–80%; Fitzpatrick: 40–50%

Oregon Republican U.S. Senate primary results
Party	Candidate	Votes	%
Republican	John Lim	135,048	62.45%
Republican	John Michael Fitzpatrick	58,139	26.88%
Republican	Valentine Christian	20,569	9.51%
Republican	Write-ins	2,509	1.16%
Total votes		216,265	100.00%

== General ==
Wyden, a consistent liberal Democrat, was considered to be the favorite throughout the campaign. State Republicans were weakened by division between moderate and conservative wings, with few candidates on the already sparse bench able to reconcile them. During his campaign, Wyden emphasized his work with fellow Oregon Senator and Republican Gordon H. Smith. Lim had very little name recognition outside of his Gresham-based State Senate district and focused his campaign on portraying Wyden as a Beltway insider and out-of-touch with the population of Oregon.

=== Polling ===
Poll source	Date(s) administered	Sample size (Note: Key: A – all adults RV – registered voters LV – likely voters V – unclear)	Margin of error	Ronald Wyden (D)	John Lim (R)	Undecided
Davis & Hibbitss	September 30 – October 6, 1998	618 (LV)	± 4.0%	68%	16%	16%

=== Results ===
Wyden won in a landslide, winning every county in the state with the exception of Malheur County. Wyden's performance, both by his portion of the vote and margin of victory, would only be exceeded by his subsequent 2004 election, being his second-best performance in a Senatorial election.

General election results
Party	Candidate	Votes	%	±%
Democratic	Ronald Wyden (Incumbent)	682,425	61.05%	+13.27%
Republican	John Lim	377,739	33.79%	−12.47%
Pacific Green	Karyn Moskowitz	22,024	1.97%	+1.37%
Libertarian	Jim Brewster	18,221	1.63%	+0.32%
Natural Law	Michael A. Campbell	8,372	0.75%	+0.75%
Socialist	Dean M. Braa	7,553	0.68%	+.02%
Write-In	Misc.	1,413	0.13%	−1.12%
Total votes		1,117,747	100.0%	
Democratic hold				

== See also ==
- 1998 United States Senate elections
