= Greg Mathews =

Gregory or Greg Mathew, Mathews, or Matthews may refer to:

- Greg Matthews (born 1959), Australian cricketer
- Greg Matthews (politician), American politician
- Greg Mathew, Australian reality show contestant
- Greg Mathews (baseball) (born 1962), baseball player
- Gregory Mathews (1876–1949), ornithologist
