= Jim Huffman =

American lawyer

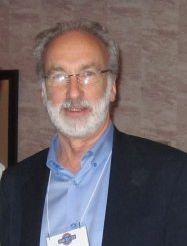

Personal details
- Born: March 25, 1945 (age 81) Fort Benton, Montana, U.S.
- Party: Republican
- Spouse: Leslie Huffman
- Children: 3
- Education: Montana State University, Bozeman; Tufts University; University of Chicago

James L. Huffman (born March 25, 1945) is a former professor of law and the former dean of Lewis & Clark Law School in Portland, Oregon. He was the Republican nominee in the 2010 U.S. Senate election in Oregon, losing to incumbent Democrat Ron Wyden.

== Early life ==
Huffman was born in Fort Benton, Montana in 1945 and grew up in Bozeman, Montana, where he graduated from Bozeman High School. He attended one year at Stanford University before returning to Bozeman, where he earned a Bachelor of Science degree from Montana State University in 1967. He earned a master's degree from the Fletcher School of Law and Diplomacy at Tufts University in 1969, and a J.D. degree from the University of Chicago in 1972.

== Academic career ==
Huffman joined the law faculty at Lewis & Clark in 1973 and served as Dean of the Law School from 1994 to 2006, when he returned to full-time teaching. Huffman taught Constitutional law, jurisprudence, and natural resources and water law. He retired in 2011.

== 2010 U.S. Senate campaign ==
Huffman announced his candidacy for the Republican nomination in the 2010 United States Senate election for the seat held by Democrat Ron Wyden. In a field of seven Republicans, Huffman won 42% of the vote. In the November general election, Huffman lost to Wyden 57%–39%.

Party political offices
Preceded by Al King	Republican nominee for U.S. Senator from Oregon (Class 3); 2010	Succeeded by Mark Callahan
