= 2008 Oregon Commissioner of Labor election =

2008 Oregon Commissioner of Labor and Industries election
- November 4, 2008
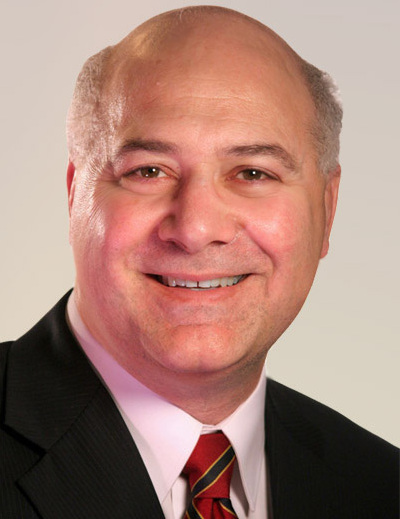

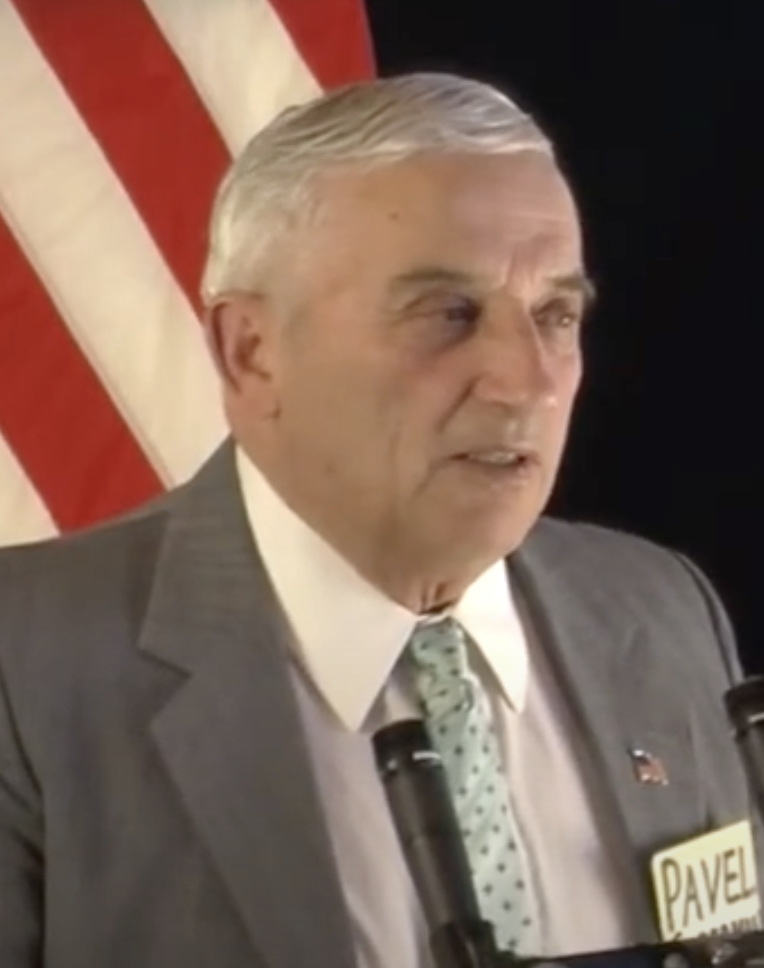

Nominee	Brad Avakian	Pavel Goberman	Mark Welyczko
Party	Nonpartisan	Nonpartisan	Nonpartisan
Popular vote	690,000	184,919	135,666
Percentage	67.21%	18.01%	13.22%
- County results Avakian: 55–60% 60–65% 65–70% 70–75%
Commissioner of Labor and Industries before election
Brad Avakian
Elected Commissioner of Labor and Industries
Brad Avakian

The 2008 Oregon Commissioner of Labor and Industries election was held on November 4, 2008, in order to elect the Oregon Commissioner of Labor and Industries. The election was held on a nonpartisan basis.

Incumbent Commissioner Brad Avakian, who had been appointed by Governor Ted Kulongoski after Commissioner Dan Gardner resigned, was elected to a full term.

== Candidates ==
- Brad Avakian, incumbent Labor Commissioner
- Pavel Goberman, fitness instructor and perennial candidate
- Mark Welyczko, security guard

While the position of Labor Commissioner is nonpartisan, Avakian is a known Democrat. Welyczko had previously challenged incumbent David Wu in that year's congressional primaries as a Democrat, and Goberman had run for a variety of offices under different parties, including as a Democrat, Republican, and Libertarian.

== Campaign ==
Avakian, at the time a state senator, was appointed Labor Commissioner in March 2008 and took office April 8. A special election was set for November 4, alongside the general election scheduled for that date.

Avakian faced two opponents with no political experience. Despite that, he spent on advertising, aiming to boost his low statewide name recognition. He was endorsed by the Oregonian and Willamette Week.

== Results ==
General election results
Party	Candidate	Votes	%
Nonpartisan	Brad Avakian	690,000	67.21%
Nonpartisan	Pavel Goberman	184,919	18.01%
Nonpartisan	Mark R. Welyczko	135,666	13.22%
	write-ins	16,056	1.56%
Total votes		1,026,641	100.00%

== See also ==
- 2008 Oregon state elections
