= 2010 United States Senate election in Oregon =

- November 2, 2010
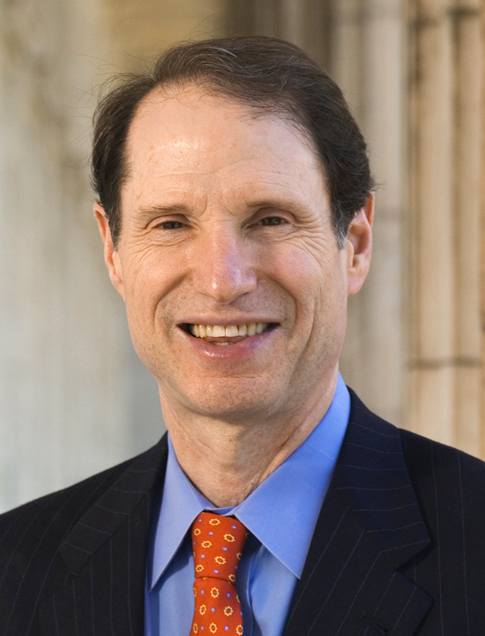

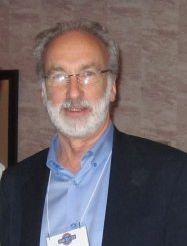
Nominee	Ron Wyden	Jim Huffman
Party	Democratic	Republican
Popular vote	825,507	566,199
Percentage	57.22%	39.25%
- County results Wyden: 40–50% 50–60% 60–70% 70–80% Huffman: 40–50% 50–60% 60–70%
U.S. senator before election
Ron Wyden
Democratic
Elected U.S. Senator
Ron Wyden
Democratic

The 2010 United States Senate election in Oregon was held on November 2, 2010, alongside other elections to the United States Senate in other states, as well as elections to the United States House of Representatives and various state and local elections. Incumbent Democratic U.S. Senator Ron Wyden won re-election to a third full term by a landslide margin of 18 points, despite the strong national Republican midterm wave. As of 2022, this is the last senate election where Deschutes County voted for the Republican candidate (albeit by a plurality).

== Democratic primary ==
=== Candidates ===
- Pavel Goberman, fitness instructor and mentalist, perennial candidate
- Loren Hooker, farmer
- Ron Wyden, incumbent U.S. Senator

=== Polling ===
Poll source	Dates administered	Ron Wyden	Loren Hooker	Pavel Goberman	Undecided
Survey USA	May 7–9, 2010	80%	9%	4%	8%

=== Results ===
Oregon Democratic U.S. Senate primary results
Party	Candidate	Votes	%
Democratic	Ronald Wyden (Incumbent)	323,652	89.55%
Democratic	Loren Hooker	25,152	6.75%
Democratic	Pavel Goberman	9,985	2.68%
Democratic	Write Ins	3,782	1.02%
Total votes		376,353	100.00%

== Republican primary ==
=== Candidates ===
- Shane Dinkel, U.S. Army officer and farm worker
- Jim Huffman, Lewis & Clark Law School law professor
- Loren Later, businessman
- Robin Parker, businessman
- Thomas Stutzman, real estate broker
- Keith Waldron, farmer and truck driver
- Walter Woodland, woodworker

=== Polling ===
Poll source	Dates administered	Jim Huffman	Thomas Stutzman	Keith Waldron	Robin Parker	Undecided
Survey USA	May 7–9, 2010	20%	11%	9%	6%	43%

=== Results ===
Results by county Huffman: 20–30%; 30–40%; 40–50%; 50–60%; 60–70%; Dinkel: 20–30%

Oregon Republican U.S. Senate primary results
Party	Candidate	Votes	%
Republican	Jim Huffman	110,450	41.70
Republican	Loren Later	39,753	15.01
Republican	G. Shane Dinkel	36,760	13.88
Republican	Thomas Stutzman	31,859	12.03
Republican	Keith Waldron	24,602	9.29
Republican	Robin Parker	14,637	5.53
Republican	Walter Woodland	4,417	1.67
	Miscellaneous	2,363	0.89
Total votes		264,841	100

== General election ==
=== Candidates ===
- Bruce Cronk (Working Families), retired electrician
- Marc Delphine (Libertarian), financial planner and LGBT and Tea Party activist
- Jim Huffman (Republican), Lewis & Clark Law School law professor
- Rick Staggenborg (Progressive), physician and founder of Soldiers For Peace
- Ron Wyden (Democratic), incumbent U.S. Senator

=== Campaign ===
Wyden, a popular incumbent with a 52% approval rating in a July poll, touted bipartisanship and promised to hold town-hall meetings annually in each of Oregon's 36 counties and to open offices outside of Portland and Salem. A Survey USA poll taken a few days before the election showed that 23% of Republicans supported Wyden.

Huffman, widely considered as an underdog, financed his own campaign. He defended bonuses for Wall Street executives and questioned global warming.

=== Debates ===
The first debate took place on October 21, 2010, in Medford, Oregon and was broadcast by KOBI-TV. Only the two major-party candidates, Huffman and Wyden, participated in the debate. The second debate, which was hosted by the City Club of Portland at the Governor Hotel, took place on October 22. The debate played live on KOIN and re-aired on Oregon Public Broadcasting later that night.

=== Predictions ===
Source	Ranking	As of
Cook Political Report	Solid D	October 26, 2010
Rothenberg	Safe D	October 22, 2010
RealClearPolitics	Likely D	October 26, 2010
Sabato's Crystal Ball	Safe D	October 21, 2010
CQ Politics	Safe D	October 26, 2010

=== Polling ===
Poll source	Dates administered	Jim Huffman (R)	Ron Wyden (D)
Rasmussen Reports	February 16, 2010	35%	49%
Rasmussen Reports	May 24, 2010	38%	51%
Survey USA	June 7–9, 2010	38%	51%
Rasmussen Reports	June 17, 2010	37%	47%
Davis, Hibbits and Midghall	June 21, 2010	32%	50%
Rasmussen Reports	July 26, 2010	35%	51%
Survey USA	July 25–27, 2010	35%	53%
Rasmussen Reports	August 22, 2010	36%	56%
Rasmussen Reports	September 8, 2010	35%	53%
Survey USA	September 12–14, 2010	38%	54%
Rasmussen Reports	October 10, 2010	36%	52%
Survey USA	October 12–14, 2010	34%	56%
Public Policy Polling	October 17, 2010	40%	56%
Rasmussen Reports	October 25, 2010	42%	53%
Survey USA	October 23–28, 2010	32%	57%

=== Fundraising ===
Candidate (party)	Receipts	Disbursements	Cash on hand	Debt
Ron Wyden (D)	$5,529,660	$4,820,297	$1,827,374	$0
James Huffman (R)	$2,227,784	$1,576,662	$651,118	$1,350,000
Marc Delphine (L)	$4,728	$4,805	$221	$0
Source: Federal Election Commission

=== Results ===
General election results
Party	Candidate	Votes	%
Democratic	Ronald Wyden (Incumbent)	825,507	57.22%
Republican	Jim Huffman	566,199	39.25%
Working Families	Bruce Cronk	18,940	1.31%
Libertarian	Marc Delphine	16,028	1.11%
Progressive	Rick Staggenborg	14,466	1.00%
Write-in		1,448	0.10%
Total votes		1,442,588	100.0%
Democratic hold			

==== Results by county ====
County	Ron Wyden Democratic		Jim Huffman Republican		All others		Margin		Total votes cast
County	#	%	#	%	#	%	#	%	Total votes cast
Baker	2,929	40.3%	4,012	55.2%	325	4.5%	-1,083	-14.9%	7,266
Benton	22,822	63.5%	11,696	32.5%	1,435	4.0%	11,126	31.0%	35,953
Clackamas	83,696	54.0%	67,197	43.3%	4,230	2.8%	16,499	10.7%	155,123
Clatsop	8,861	60.1%	5,324	36.1%	553	3.7%	3,537	24.0%	14,738
Columbia	10,904	54.4%	8,307	41.5%	824	4.1%	2,597	12.9%	20,035
Coos	12,323	49.1%	11,447	45.6%	1,314	5.3%	876	3.5%	25,084
Crook	3,663	41.4%	4,884	55.2%	298	3.3%	-1,221	-13.8%	8,845
Curry	4,475	43.6%	5,257	51.2%	540	5.3%	-782	-7.6%	10,272
Deschutes	30,809	48.5%	30,831	48.6%	1,850	3.0%	-22	-0.1%	63,490
Douglas	17,095	39.7%	24,081	56.0%	1,859	4.4%	-6,986	-16.3%	43,035
Gilliam	504	52.7%	425	44.4%	28	2.9%	79	8.3%	957
Grant	1,041	30.3%	2,289	66.7%	100	2.8%	-1,248	-36.4%	3,430
Harney	1,264	37.8%	1,958	58.5%	125	3.8%	-694	-20.7%	3,347
Hood River	5,575	66.7%	2,544	30.4%	245	2.9%	3,031	36.3%	8,364
Jackson	39,839	51.4%	34,912	45.1%	2,737	3.5%	4,927	6.3%	77,488
Jefferson	3,036	46.0%	3,374	51.1%	193	2.9%	-338	-5.1%	6,603
Josephine	14,179	42.8%	17,563	53.0%	1,408	4.2%	-3,384	-10.2%	33,150
Klamath	8,798	38.1%	13,383	57.9%	939	4.0%	-4,585	-19.8%	23,120
Lake	1,138	36.5%	1,864	59.8%	113	3.7%	-726	-23.3%	3,115
Lane	87,717	61.7%	49,316	34.7%	5,209	3.6%	38,401	27.0%	142,242
Lincoln	12,027	61.2%	6,766	34.4%	858	4.3%	5,261	26.8%	19,651
Linn	18,296	44.4%	21,131	51.2%	1,811	4.4%	-2,835	-6.8%	41,238
Malheur	2,215	28.8%	5,078	66.1%	394	5.1%	-2,863	-37.3%	7,687
Marion	51,879	51.9%	44,869	44.9%	3,245	3.2%	7,010	7.0%	99,993
Morrow	1,372	43.3%	1,650	52.1%	146	4.7%	-278	-8.8%	3,168
Multnomah	212,371	76.1%	56,513	20.3%	10,157	3.6%	155,858	55.8%	279,041
Polk	14,834	50.3%	13,640	46.3%	993	3.4%	1,194	4.0%	29,467
Sherman	387	42.7%	495	54.6%	24	2.6%	-108	-11.9%	906
Tillamook	6,233	57.0%	4,342	39.7%	351	3.3%	1,891	17.3%	10,926
Umatilla	8,218	41.9%	10,541	53.7%	859	4.4%	-2,323	-11.8%	19,618
Union	4,892	46.3%	5,270	49.9%	398	3.8%	-378	-3.6%	10,560
Wallowa	1,492	39.6%	2,150	57.0%	127	3.4%	-658	-17.4%	3,769
Wasco	5,323	57.1%	3,710	39.8%	282	3.0%	1,613	17.3%	9,315
Washington	107,225	58.0%	71,926	38.9%	5,606	3.0%	35,299	19.1%	184,757
Wheeler	324	43.3%	388	51.9%	36	4.8%	-64	-8.6%	748
Yamhill	17,751	49.2%	17,066	47.3%	1,270	3.6%	685	1.9%	36,087
Totals	825,507	57.2%	566,199	39.2%	50,882	3.5%	259,308	18.0%	1,442,588

Counties that flipped from Democratic to Republican

- Baker (largest city: Baker City)
- Crook (largest city: Prineville)
- Curry (largest city: Brookings)
- Douglas (largest city: Roseburg)
- Deschutes (largest city: Bend)
- Jefferson (largest city: Madras)
- Josephine (largest city: Grants Pass)
- Klamath (largest city: Klamath Falls)
- Lake (largest city: Lakeview)
- Linn (largest city: Albany)
- Morrow (largest city: Boardman)
- Sherman (largest city: Wasco)
- Umatilla (largest city: Hermiston)
- Union (largest city: La Grande)
- Wallowa (largest city: Enterprise)
- Wheeler (largest city: Fossil)
