= 2012 Oregon's 1st congressional district special election =

2012 United States House of Representatives special general election in Oregon's 1st congressional district
- January 31, 2012
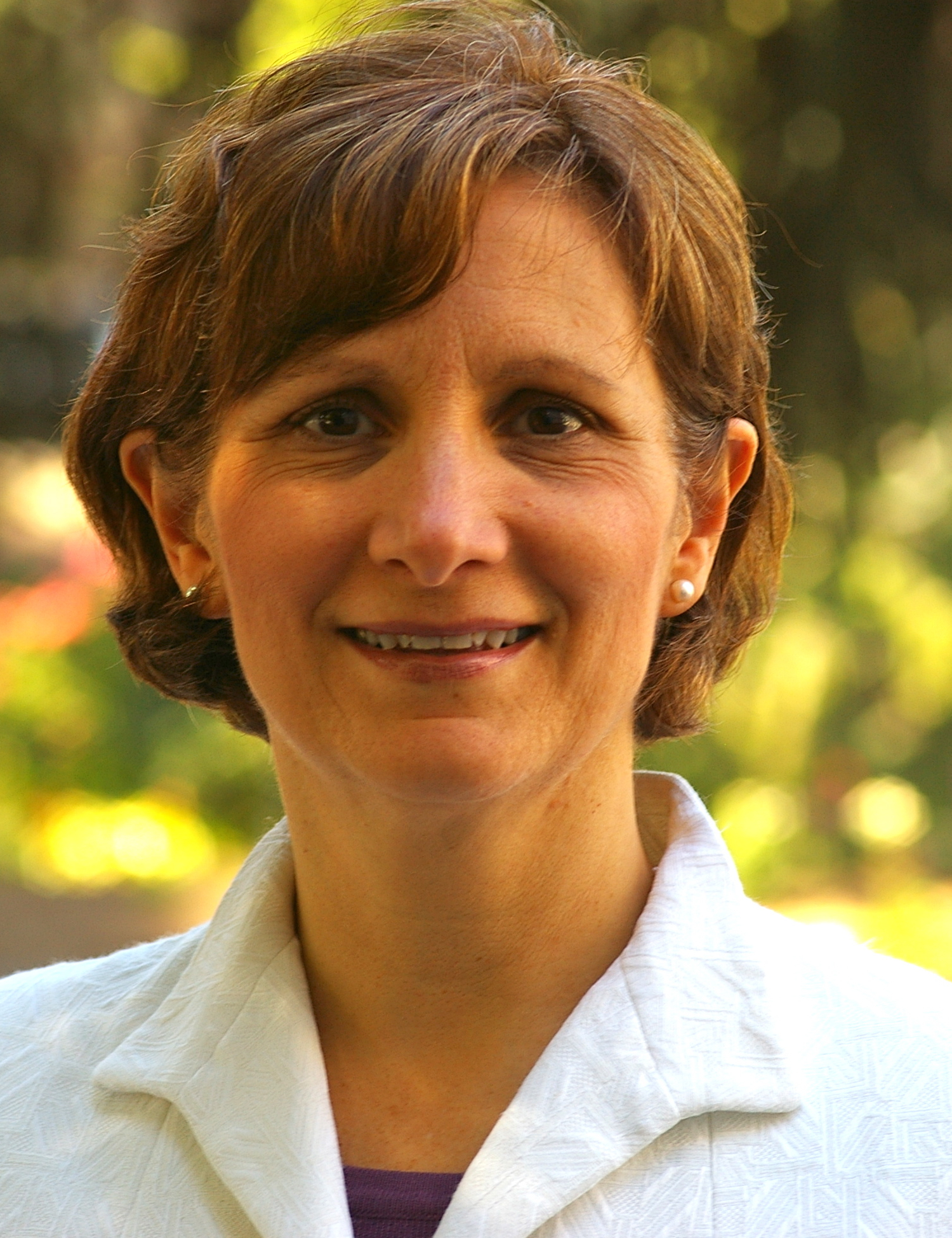

Nominee	Suzanne Bonamici	Rob Cornilles
Party	Democratic	Republican
Popular vote	111,570	81,985
Percentage	53.8%	39.6%
- County results Bonamici: 40–50% 50–60% 70–80% Cornilles: 40–50%
U.S. Representative before election
David Wu
Democratic
Elected U.S. Representative
Suzanne Bonamici
Democratic

A 2012 special election in Oregon's 1st congressional district was held on January 31, 2012, to fill a seat in the U.S. Congress for Oregon's 1st congressional district, following the resignation of Representative David Wu. Primary elections were held on November 8, 2011, with the Democrats selecting state senator Suzanne Bonamici and the Republicans selecting businessman Rob Cornilles.

Bonamici was declared the winner almost as soon as the ballot deadline expired at 8 pm PST. She carried every county in the district except Yamhill County, which Cornilles won by a seven-point margin.

== Democratic primary ==
Ballots were due for the Democratic primary on November 8, 2011.

=== Candidates ===
The following candidates filed to run in the primary:

- Saba Ahmed, lobbyist and former engineer
- Brad Avakian, commissioner of the Oregon Bureau of Labor and Industries
- Suzanne Bonamici, state senator
- Dominick Hammon, former contractor
- Robert Lettin, investment adviser
- Todd Ritter, textbook dealer
- Dan Strite, golf professional and business owner
- Brad Witt, state representative

=== Polling ===
Poll source	Dates administered	Brad Avakian	Suzanne Bonamici	Dominick Hannon	Robert Lettin	Todd Ritter	Dan Strite	Brad Witt	Other	Undecided
Oregonian/KGW	October 24–26, 2011	11%	45%	–	–	–	–	5%	1%	38%
Survey USA	October 17–20, 2011	14%	52%	1%	0%	1%	1%	9%	–	21%

=== Results ===
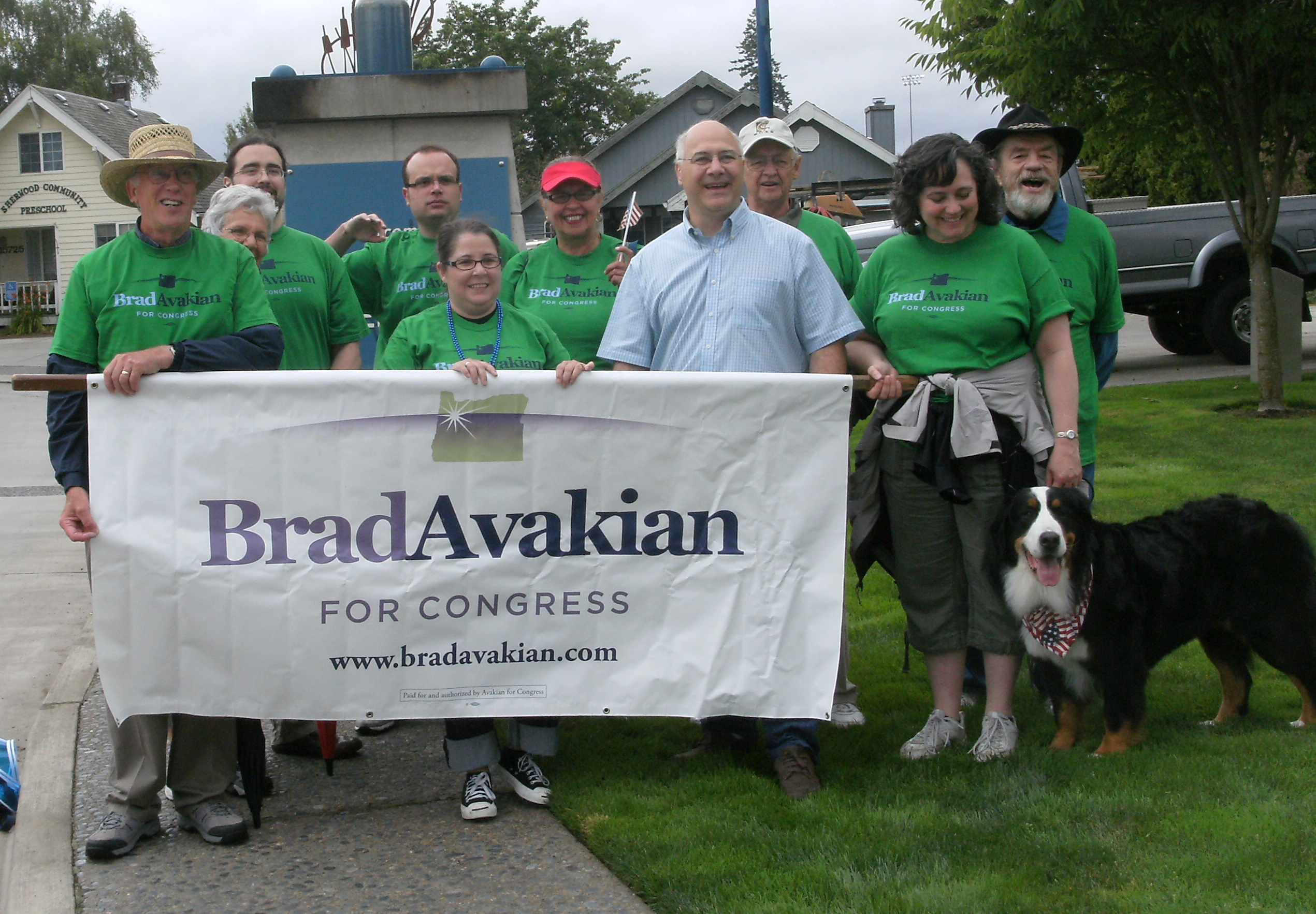
Avakian with supporters

Democratic Primary results
Party	Candidate	Votes	%
Democratic	Suzanne Bonamici	48,404	65.27
Democratic	Brad Avakian	16,415	22.13
Democratic	Brad Witt	5,870	7.92
Democratic	Dan Strite	1,176	1.59
Democratic	Dominic Hammon	889	1.20
Democratic	Todd Lee Ritter	632	0.85
	write-ins	454	0.61
Democratic	Saba Ahmed	231	0.31
Democratic	Robert E. Lettin	91	0.12
Total votes		74,162	100

== Republican primary ==
Ballots were due for the Republican primary on November 8, 2011.

=== Candidates ===
The following candidates have filed to run in the primary:

- Rob Cornilles, businessman and unsuccessful 2010 nominee
- Pavel Goberman, fitness instructor and perennial candidate
- Jim Greenfield, real estate investor and film producer
- Lisa Michaels, activist and cable show host
- Delinda Delgado-Morgan, works with the International Union of Operating Engineers

=== Polling ===
Poll source	Dates administered	Rob Cornilles	Delinda Delgado-Morgan	Pavel Goberman	Jim Greenfield	Lisa Michaels	Undecided
Survey USA	October 17–20, 2011	66%	2%	1%	4%	7%	20%

=== Results ===
Republican Primary results
Party	Candidate	Votes	%
Republican	Rob Cornilles	39,500	72.76
Republican	Jim Greenfield	6,222	11.46
Republican	Lisa Michaels	5,597	10.31
Republican	Pavel Goberman	1,629	3.00
Republican	Delinda Delgado-Morgan	831	1.53
	write-ins	507	0.93
Total votes		54,286	100

== Independent primary ==
Oregon's cross nomination system, a form of fusion voting, allows a candidate for partisan public office to be nominated by up to three political parties. In November 2011, the Independent Party of Oregon held a primary, announcing the results on November 30. Suzanne Bonamici won the primary and was able to list herself as the nominee of the Independent Party on the general election ballot.

=== Candidates ===
- Suzanne Bonamici, Oregon state senator
- Rob Cornilles, businessman

=== Results ===
Independent Party of Oregon primary results
Party	Candidate	Votes	%
Democratic	Suzanne Bonamici	56	64.37
Republican	Rob Cornilles	31	35.63

== Special general election ==
Ballots were due for the special election on January 31, 2012.

=== Candidates ===
The following candidates will be on the ballot:

- Suzanne Bonamici, (Democrat, Independent), State Senator
- Rob Cornilles (Republican), businessman
- James Foster (Libertarian), computer programmer
- Steven Reynolds (Progressive), Army veteran

=== Polling ===
Poll Source	Date Administered	Suzanne Bonamici (D)	Rob Cornilles (R)	James Foster (L)	Steven Reynolds (OPP)	Undecided
Survey USA	December 22, 2011 – January 4, 2012	50%	39%	2%	2%	7%
Public Policy Polling/Daily Kos/SEIU	December 13–14, 2011	52%	41%	–	–	7%

=== Results ===
Oregon's 1st congressional district special election, 2012
Party	Candidate	Votes	%
Democratic	Suzanne Bonamici	111,570	53.82
Republican	Rob Cornilles	81,985	39.55
Progressive	Steven Reynolds	6,679	3.22
Libertarian	James Foster	6,524	3.15
	write-ins	527	0.25
Total votes		207,285	100.0
Democratic hold			

==== By county ====
County	Suzanne Bonamici Democratic		Rob Cornilles Republican		Various candidates Other parties		Margin		Total
County	#	%	#	%	#	%	#	%	Total
Clatsop	6,105	53.93%	4,355	38.47%	861	7.60%	1,750	15.46%	11,321
Columbia	6,949	49.29%	5,834	41.38%	1,314	9.33%	1,115	7.91%	14,097
Multnomah (part)	20,735	75.22%	5,491	19.92%	1,342	4.86%	15,244	55.30%	27,568
Washington	68,890	52.01%	55,137	41.63%	8,416	6.36%	13,753	10.38%	132,443
Yamhill	10,725	42.33%	12,579	50.36%	2,030	7.31%	-1,854	-8.03%	25,334
Totals	111,570	53.82%	81,985	39.55%	13,730	6.62%	29,585	14.27%	207,285

== See also ==
- List of special elections to the United States House of Representatives
- 2012 United States House of Representatives elections in Oregon
- 2012 United States House of Representatives elections
- 2012 United States presidential election in Oregon
- 2012 Oregon state elections
