= Ron Wyden =

American politician (born 1949)

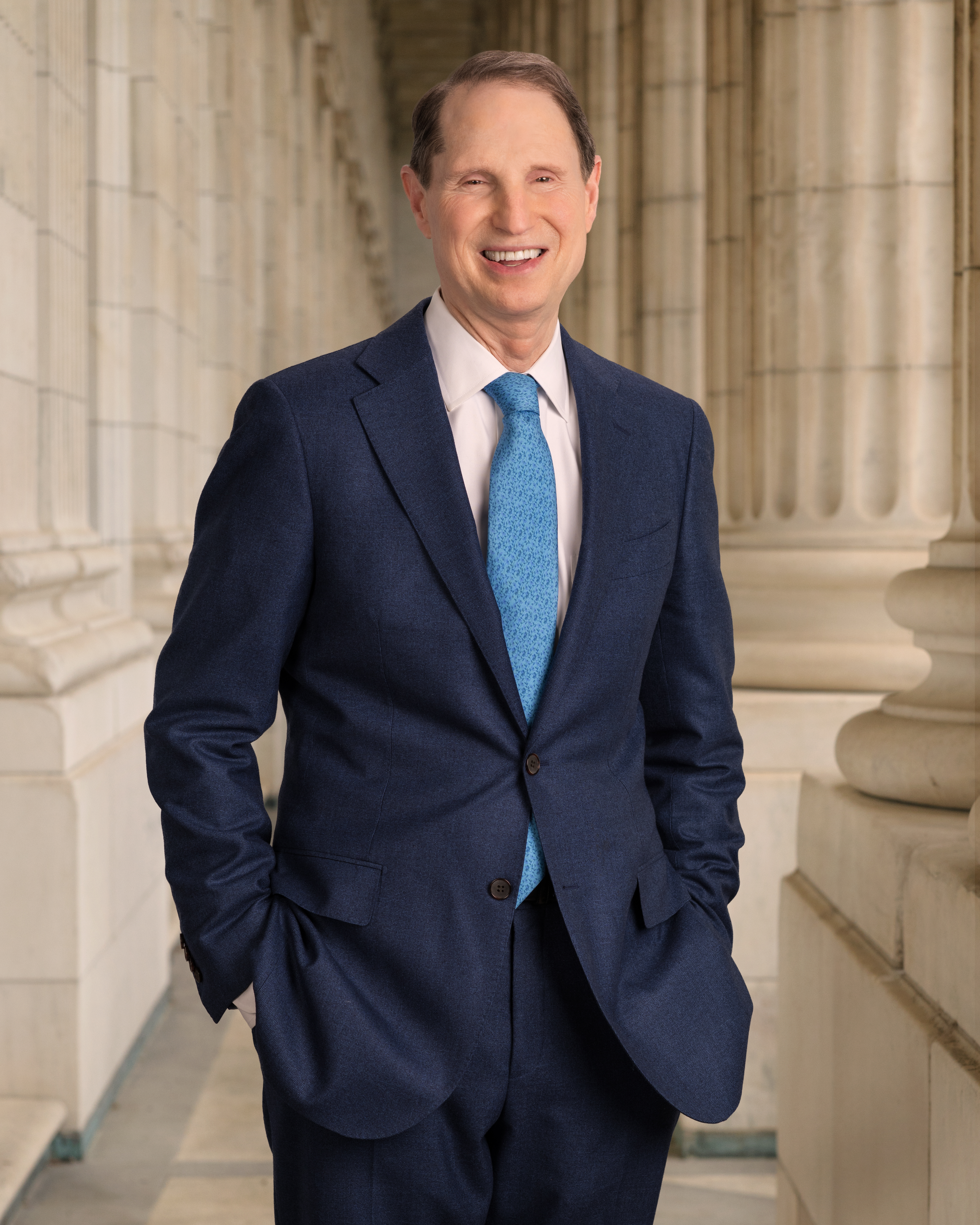
- Official portrait, 2021

United States Senator from Oregon
- Incumbent
- Assumed office February 6, 1996 Serving with Jeff Merkley
- Preceded by: Bob Packwood
Committee positions
Ranking Member of the Senate Finance Committee
Incumbent
Assumed office January 3, 2025
Preceded by	Mike Crapo
In office January 3, 2015 – February 3, 2021
Preceded by	Orrin Hatch
Succeeded by	Mike Crapo
Chair of the Senate Finance Committee
In office February 3, 2021 – January 3, 2025
Preceded by	Chuck Grassley
Succeeded by	Mike Crapo
In office February 12, 2014 – January 3, 2015
Preceded by	Max Baucus
Succeeded by	Orrin Hatch
Chair of the Senate Energy Committee
In office January 3, 2013 – February 12, 2014
Preceded by	Jeff Bingaman
Succeeded by	Mary Landrieu

Member of the U.S. House of Representatives from Oregon's 3rd district
- In office January 3, 1981 – February 5, 1996
- Preceded by: Robert B. Duncan
- Succeeded by: Earl Blumenauer

Personal details
- Born: Ronald Lee Wyden; May 3, 1949 (age 77) Wichita, Kansas, U.S.
- Party: Democratic
- Spouses: Laurie Oseran (m. 1979; div. 1999); Nancy Bass (m. 2005)
- Children: 5
- Relatives: Peter H. Wyden (father); Franz Weidenreich (grand-uncle)
- Education: University of California, Santa Barbara (attended); Stanford University (BA); University of Oregon (JD)
- Website: Senate website Campaign website
- Wyden's voice Wyden on Social Security funding Recorded June 9, 2022

Ronald Lee Wyden (/ˈwaɪdən/ WY-dən; born May 3, 1949) is an American attorney and politician serving as the senior United States senator from Oregon, a seat he has held since 1996. A member of the Democratic Party, he served in the United States House of Representatives from 1981 until 1996. He is the dean of Oregon's congressional delegation and serves as the ranking member of the Senate Finance Committee. Known for his libertarian-leaning stances within the Democratic Party, Wyden has been a prominent advocate for privacy rights, internet freedom, and limiting government surveillance, positioning him as a defender of civil liberties.

== Early life, education, and early career ==
Ronald Wyden was born in Wichita, Kansas, the son of Edith (née Rosenow) and Peter H. Wyden (originally Weidenreich, 1923–1998), both of whom were Jewish and had fled Nazi Germany. He grew up in Palo Alto, California, where he played basketball for Palo Alto High School. He attended the University of California, Santa Barbara, on a basketball scholarship, and later transferred to Stanford University, where he majored in political science and received his Bachelor of Arts in 1971. He received a Juris Doctor from the University of Oregon School of Law in 1974, but has never been a member of the Oregon State Bar.

While teaching gerontology at several Oregon universities, Wyden founded the Oregon chapter of the Gray Panthers, which he led from 1974 to 1980. He was also the director of the Oregon Legal Services Center for Elderly, a nonprofit law service. From 1977 to 1979 he served on the Oregon State Board of Examiners of Nursing Home Administrators.

== U.S. House of Representatives ==
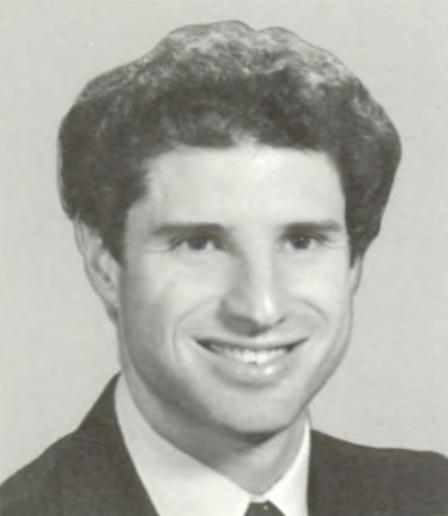
Wyden in 1981

Wyden ran for the United States House of Representatives in 1980. In the Democratic primary, Wyden, who was just 31 at the time, upset incumbent Representative Bob Duncan in Oregon's 3rd congressional district, which includes most of Portland. Later that fall, Wyden defeated his Republican opponent, Darrell Conger, with 71% of the vote. The 3rd has long been the most Democratic district in Oregon, and Wyden was reelected seven times, never with less than 70% of the vote.

In the House, Wyden played an influential role in the passage of Section 230 of the Communications Decency Act of 1996.

== U.S. Senate ==
=== Elections ===
==== 1996 Special ====
In January 1996, in a special election to fill the Senate seat vacated by Bob Packwood, Wyden defeated Oregon State Senate President Gordon Smith by just over 18,000 votes, mainly due to swamping Smith by over 89,000 votes in Multnomah County. Smith won the regular Senate election that November to succeed the retiring Mark Hatfield, and Smith and Wyden served together until Smith's defeat in 2008 by Democrat Jeff Merkley.

Wyden holds the Senate seat that was once held by Wayne Morse, a man whom Wyden worked for in the summer of 1968 as Morse's driver, and whom Wyden calls his mentor.

==== 1998 ====
Wyden was elected to a full term in 1998 with 61% of the vote.

==== 2004 ====
Wyden was reelected in 2004 with 64% of the vote to Republican nominee Al King's 31%.

==== 2010 ====
In 2010, Wyden was reelected with 57% of the vote to Jim Huffman's 39%.

==== 2016 ====
In 2016, Wyden was reelected with 57% of the vote to Republican nominee Mark Callahan's 33%.

==== 2022 ====
In 2022, Wyden was reelected with 56% of the vote to Republican nominee Jo Rae Perkins's 41%.

=== Tenure ===
In June 1996, Wyden offered an amendment to the mission of the Federal Aviation Administration (FAA) that was endorsed by Transportation Secretary Federico F. Peña. In September, Wyden joined Wendell H. Ford in requesting that the FAA publicize information on the federal government's reason for not making safety data on the airlines more readily available to travelers.

In late 1999, Wyden threatened a filibuster amid Senate debate over banning physician-assisted suicide.

In May 2000, Wyden and Republican Representative Bill Thomas announced they would collaborate on an attempt to add prescription drug benefits to Medicare that year.

In January 2001, Wyden and Chuck Schumer were the only two senators on the Senate Energy and Natural Resources Committee to vote against the confirmation of Gale Norton as Secretary of the Interior. Wyden admitted reluctance in his opposition and said he hoped that Norton would change his view of her.

In February 2001, after the U.S. Department of Transportation's Inspector General's Office released a report on airlines providing "untimely, incomplete, or unreliable reports" on flight delays and cancellations, Wyden said the matter amounted to a "failure to communicate honestly about delays and cancellations" as well as the bumping of passengers from flights and that Congress was capable of taking action to give passengers "timely, accurate information and reasonable service." In March, Wyden stated his support for ending a federal rule requiring commercial pilots to cease flying after age 60.

In April 2001, Wyden joined Gordon H. Smith in introducing a proposal for a change in a budget resolution, saying Congress not responding at a time of layoffs was "nothing short of government malpractice." The change was adopted without dissent.

In May 2001, Wyden released a letter by Inspector General Kenneth M. Mead in which he stated that airlines had admitted to him that they deliberately delayed some evening flights to accommodate late-arriving passengers who would otherwise have had to wait until the next morning without notifying passengers of the change in schedule. During an address to the International Aviation Club days later, Wyden warned that airlines that persisted in fighting modest steps like informing the public of perpetually late flights would encounter more burdensome requirements later.

In January 2002, Wyden charged Enron with resorting "to a variety of legal, regulatory and accounting contortions to keep investors and the public in the dark" and called for Congress to begin an investigation into the matter. In February, he said that thousands of Oregonians had been harmed by Enron's collapse and advocated that the Senate Commerce Committee continue inquiring about Enron until they had all the facts.

In March 2002, amid the Senate's inability to reach an agreement on legislation intended to overhaul American election procedures, Wyden said the bill was "not a corpse" and must not disrupt Oregon's and Washington's vote-by-mail systems.

In November 2003, Wyden announced his support for the George W. Bush administration-backed Medicare bill, touted as "the biggest expansion of Medicare since its creation in 1965."

In April 2004, Wyden was among a group of senators who took to the Senate floor to endorse a permanent ban on taxes on Internet access. Wyden said the subject was "about as interesting as prolonged root-canal work" but that it was "fair to say that the decisions the Senate makes with respect to this subject will say a whole lot about the future of the Internet."

In August 2004, amid Democratic opposition to the nomination of Porter Goss for Director of Central Intelligence, Wyden said that Democrats were aware "of what happened in the last election cycle on homeland security" and that he hoped "that Democrats aren't accused by anybody of being obstructionist just by asking tough questions."

In December 2004, Wyden was one of four Democratic senators to refuse to sign "conference sheets" used by the House-Senate conference committee that was working on the 2005 intelligence authorization bill, the four objecting to a classified item in the bill that they believed the funding of which "should be expended on other intelligence programs that will make a surer and greater contribution to national security."

On March 2, 2006, Wyden unveiled the Internet Nondiscrimination Act of 2006, legislation intended to prohibit network operators from charging companies "for faster delivery of their content to consumers over the internet or favoring certain content over others." He said a two-tier system "could have a chilling effect on small mom and pop businesses that can't afford the priority lane, leaving these smaller businesses no hope of competing against the Wal-Marts of the world" and that neutrality in technology allowed "small businesses to thrive on the Internet".

In July 2009, President Barack Obama praised Wyden as a "real thought leader" and an ally on health care reform, but announced he would not support Wyden's health care plan because parts of it were too radical for the United States.

Wyden characterizes himself as an "independent voice for Oregonians and the nation" and emphasizes his positions on health care reform, national security, consumer protection, and government transparency. On the Issues characterizes him as a "Hard-Core Liberal."

On March 6, 2013, Wyden crossed party lines to join Republican Senator Rand Paul, who was engaged in a talking filibuster to block voting on the nomination of John O. Brennan as the Director of the CIA. Wyden questioned the use of drones, saying, "what it comes down to is every American has the right to know when their government believes that it is allowed to kill them."

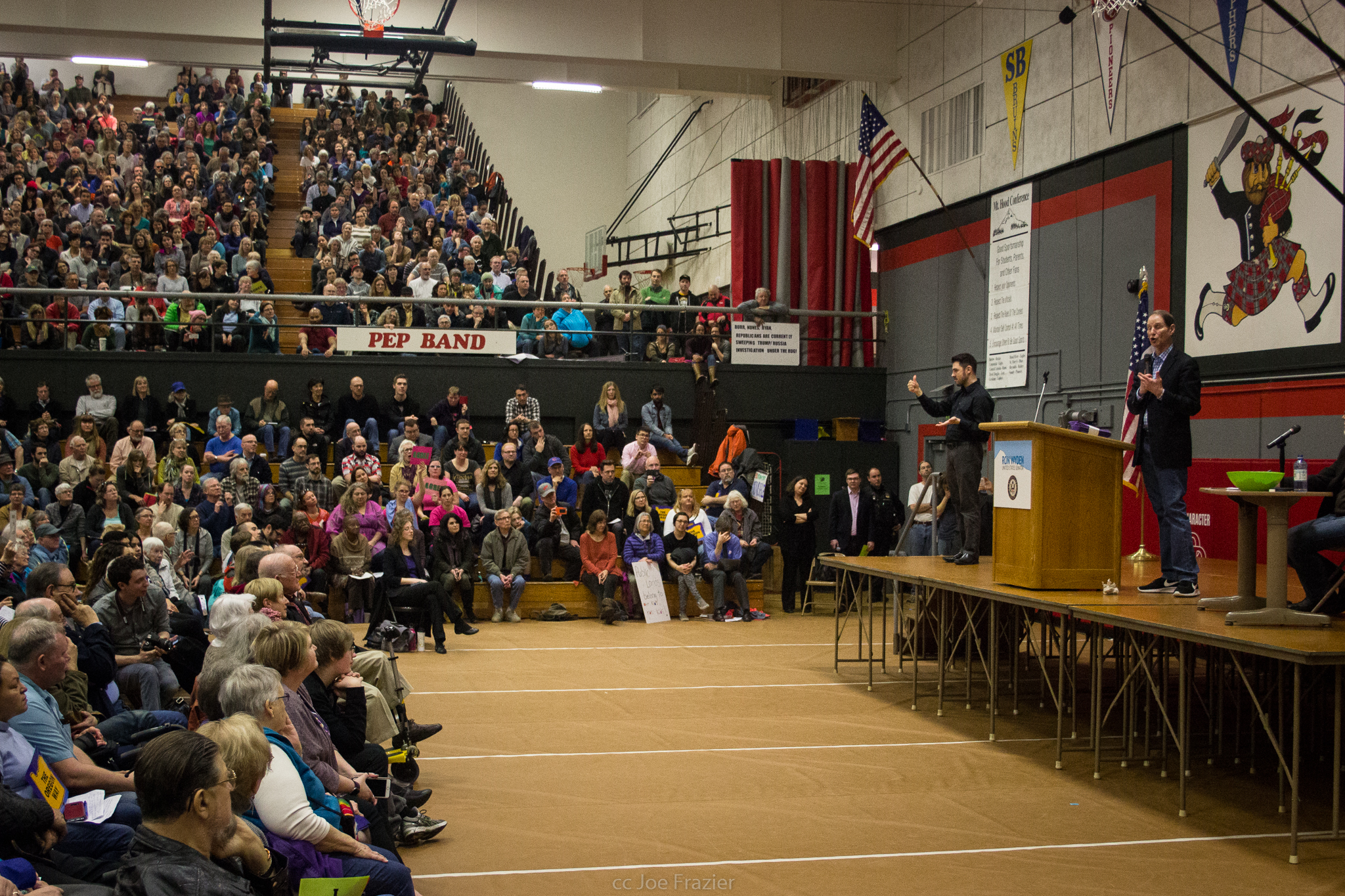
Wyden in Portland, Oregon, February 25, 2017

Politico reported that Wyden's ascent to chair of the Senate Finance Committee would vault him into the ranks of the chamber's most influential. He has been praised for his ability to defuse partisan tensions and encourage bipartisan cooperation.

In August 2016, in response to Republican presidential nominee Donald Trump's refusal to disclose his tax returns, Wyden and Chris Murphy announced that they would press for consideration of Wyden's bill that if enacted would require major-party presidential nominees to disclose at least three years of tax returns and thereby authorize the Treasury Department to release Trump's returns over Trump's objections. Wyden asserted that Americans expect candidates to release their tax returns and Trump's break from tradition was "an exceptional moment where a long-standing precedent has been broken, and it presents enormous peril to the public to have this information as private."

In May 2017, after Trump announced the firing of FBI Director James Comey, Wyden restated his past criticisms and said the decision to fire him amid investigation of Trump and his associate into possible Russian ties was "outrageous". Wyden advocated that Comey be called to testify in an open hearing about the investigation of Russia and Trump associates at the time his tenure was terminated.

In August 2017, Wyden was one of four senators to unveil the Internet of Things Cybersecurity Improvement Act of 2017, legislation intended to establish "thorough, yet flexible, guidelines for Federal Government procurements of connected devices."

In December 2017, Wyden called for Trump to resign over allegations of sexual misconduct and said Congress should investigate the matter in the event Trump decided to remain in office.

In May 2018, Wyden was one of six Democratic senators to sign a letter asking that all members of Senate be authorized to read a report from the Department of Justice underpinning the decision to not seek charges in the CIA's destruction of videotapes.

In July 2018, after Trump nominated Brett Kavanaugh to the Supreme Court, Wyden said Trump had begun "a forced march back to the days when women's health care choices were made by government" and "a direct attempt to overturn Roe v. Wade."

On August 1, 2018, Wyden announced his intent to put a formal hold on Treasury deputy secretary nominee Justin Muzinich after his confirmation by the Senate Finance Committee. He also confirmed his support for IRS general counsel nominee Michael Desmond and criticized Treasury consideration of indexing capital gains taxes to inflation as contributing extra tax savings to the wealthy along with possibly being illegal.

In August 2018, after the White House barred CNN reporter Kaitlan Collins from covering an open press event after she repeatedly asked Trump about his relationship with his former attorney Michael Cohen, Wyden cosponsored a resolution urging Trump to respect the press.

On July 9, 2024, it was reported that Wyden and Senator Sheldon Whitehouse sent an official letter to Attorney General Merrick Garland the previous week requesting that he appoint a special counsel to investigate Supreme Court Justice Clarence Thomas for tax and ethics violations. The letter says, "The breadth of the omissions uncovered to date, and the serious possibility of additional tax fraud and false statement violations by Justice Thomas and his associates, warrant the appointment of a Special Counsel to investigate this misconduct."

=== Committee assignments ===
Wyden's committee assignments for the 118th Congress are as follows:

- Committee on the Budget
- Committee on Energy and Natural Resources
  - Subcommittee on Energy
  - Subcommittee on Public Lands, Forests and Mining
  - Subcommittee on Water and Power (Chair)
- Committee on Finance (Ranking Member)
  - As Chair, Wyden is an ex officio member of all subcommittees.
- Select Committee on Intelligence
- Joint Committee On Taxation (Vice Chair)

=== Caucus memberships ===
- Congressional Coalition on Adoption
- Congressional Fire Services Caucus
- Congressional Internet Caucus
- International Conservation Caucus
- Renewable Energy and Energy Efficiency Caucus
- Senate Diabetes Caucus
- Senate Economic Mobility Caucus
- Senate Oceans Caucus
- Senate Taiwan Caucus

== Political positions ==
=== Civil liberties ===
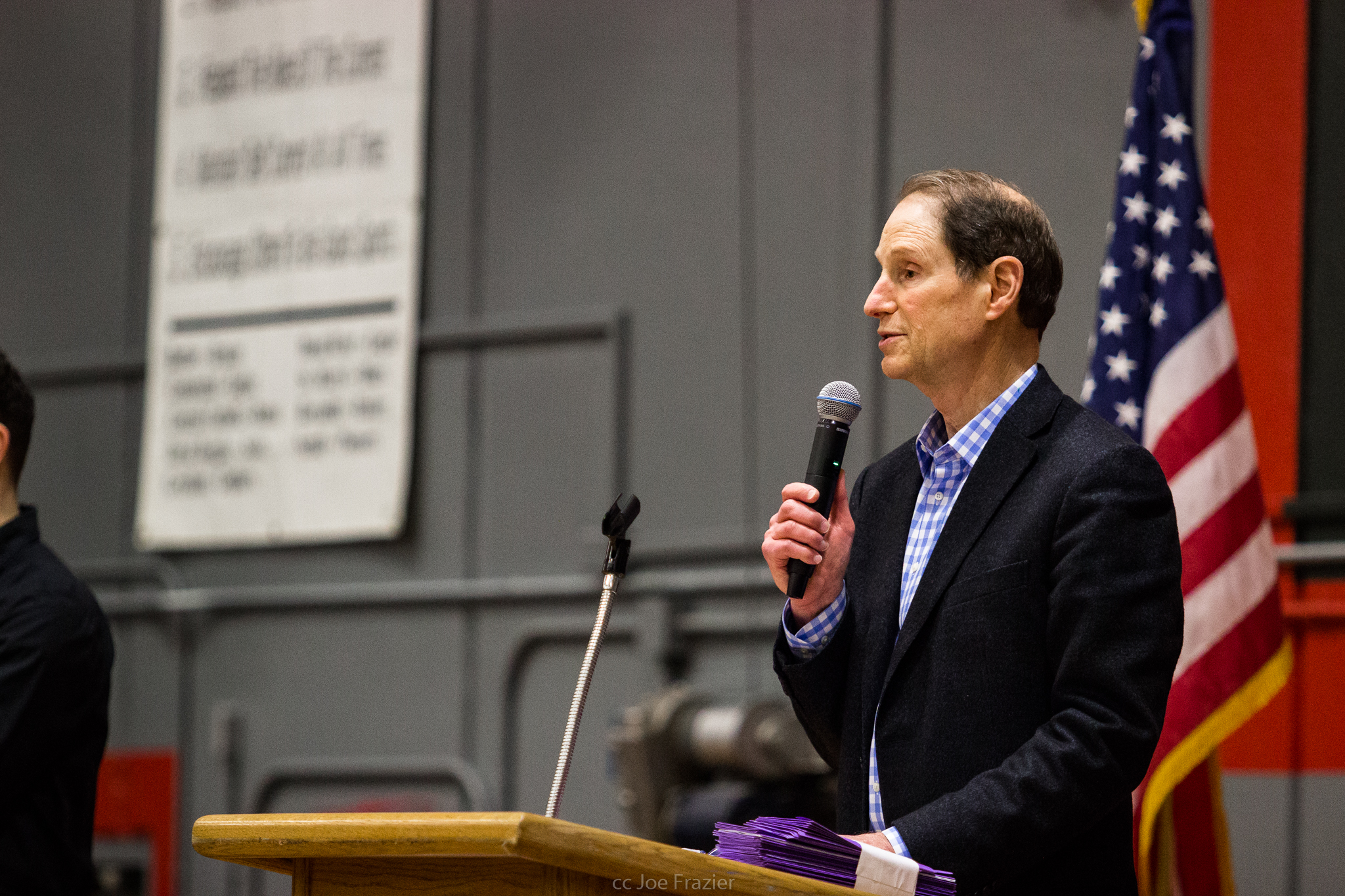
Wyden at a town hall in 2017

==== Abortion ====
Wyden supports legal abortion. Almost every year, he has maintained a 100% rating or close to it with pro-choice groups: NARAL Pro-Choice America, Planned Parenthood, and National Family Planning and Reproductive Health Association, and a 0% rating or close to it from the National Right to Life Committee.

==== Assisted suicide ====
Wyden personally opposes assisted suicide and said he voted against the Oregon Death with Dignity Act, first enacted in Oregon in 1997, each time it appeared on the ballot by voter referendum. Nevertheless, he successfully blocked congressional attempts to pass federal legislation to override Oregon's law. In 2000, Wyden blocked attempts in Congress to overturn the Oregon assisted-suicide law by threatening a filibuster. In 2001, he wrote to President George W. Bush urging him to not alter the law through federal executive action. In 2005, he and four other Democratic members of Oregon's congressional delegation filed an amicus brief in the Supreme Court case of Gonzales v. Oregon in support of the State of Oregon, and praised the eventual decision to uphold the law. In 2006, Wyden informed Senate leadership that he would block legislation overturning the Death with Dignity Act. In 2009 he said that he would continue to "fight tooth and nail" to block new federal attempts to block the law.

==== Gun control ====
Wyden is an advocate of gun control. He voted against limiting lawsuits against gun manufacturers and in favor of increasing background checks. Wyden also voted to renew the Federal Assault Weapons Ban.

In October 2015, Wyden was one of the Senate Democrats to unveil a new gun control campaign in the aftermath of the Umpqua Community College shooting. Wyden said the three areas the senators were focusing on, that of increasing background check requirements, closing "loopholes" on background checks when guns are purchased at gun shows or online, and closing the "pipeline of illegal guns" by rendering gun trafficking as a federal crime, were "common sense" and should have bipartisan support.

In January 2016, Wyden was one of 18 senators to call on the appropriations committee leadership to hold a hearing on funding for gun violence research at the CDC and spoke with other Democratic senators and researchers supporting federal funding for investigation into gun violence prevention.

At a March 2018 town hall, Wyden answered "Yes" when asked if he intended to pass bans on bump stocks and assault rifles. He expressed optimism about the chances of passing national gun legislation, noting that legislation passed in Florida in the wake of the Stoneman Douglas High School shooting was strong enough to warrant lawsuit by the NRA. In July, Wyden confirmed he had joined other senators in introducing legislation intended to ensure gun dealers were not engaging in illegal sales and bestowing the Bureau of Alcohol, Tobacco, Firearms, and Explosives with clear enforcement mechanisms. He said gun violence "demands real action by Congress" and the legislation "takes a long-overdue critical step in the right direction, holding gun dealers accountable for illegal sales, reducing the number of guns that fall into the wrong hands."

In February 2019, Wyden was one of 38 senators to sign a letter to Senate Judiciary Committee Chairman Lindsey Graham calling on him to "hold a hearing" on universal background checks and noting Graham's statement that he "intended to have the Committee work on ‘red flag’ legislation and potentially also background checks, both actions" the senators supported.

==== LGBTQIA+ rights ====
In late 1995, Wyden became the first U.S. Senate candidate (and then senator) to publicly support same-sex marriage. He was one of just 14 senators to vote against the Defense of Marriage Act in 1996. He has voted against the proposed Federal Marriage Amendment, which would have proposed an amendment to the Constitution to bar recognition of same-sex marriages. Despite undergoing tests in advance of prostate surgery scheduled two days later, Wyden appeared in the Senate chamber in December 2010 to vote for the Don't Ask, Don't Tell Repeal Act of 2010.

In May 2017, Wyden was one of 46 senators to introduce the Equality Act of 2017, described by Representative David Cicilline as ensuring "that every LGBT person can live their lives free from the fear of discrimination. Above all, it’s about honoring the values that have guided our nation since its founding. It’s critical that Congress pass the Equality Act into law."

In October 2018, Wyden was one of 20 senators to sign a letter to Secretary of State Mike Pompeo urging him to reverse the rollback of a policy that granted visas to same-sex partners of LGBTQIA+ diplomats who had unions not recognized by their home countries, writing that too many places around the world have seen LGBTQIA+ individuals "subjected to discrimination and unspeakable violence, and receive little or no protection from the law or local authorities" and that the US refusing to let LGBTQIA+ diplomats bring their partners to the US would be equivalent of America upholding "the discriminatory policies of many countries around the world."

Wyden was given a 96% rating or above in the Human Rights Campaign's Congressional Scorecard for the 109th to 120th Congress.

==== National language ====
In June 2007, Wyden was among the minority of Democrats to vote in favor of declaring English the official language of the United States.

==== Net neutrality ====
In September 2017, Wyden was one of nine senators to sign a letter to Federal Communications Commission (FCC) Chairman Ajit Pai that charged the FCC with failing "to provide stakeholders with an opportunity to comment on the tens of thousands of filed complaints that directly shed light on proposed changes to existing net neutrality protections."

In March 2018, Wyden was one of 10 senators to sign a letter spearheaded by Jeff Merkley lambasting a proposal by Pai that would curb the scope of benefits from the Lifeline program during a period where roughly 6.5 million people in poor communities relied on Lifeline to receive access to high-speed Internet, writing that it was Pai's "obligation to the American public, as the Chairman of the Federal Communications Commission, to improve the Lifeline program and ensure that more Americans can afford access, and have means of access, to broadband and phone service." The senators also advocated for insuring "Lifeline reaches more Americans in need of access to communication services."

==== Patriot Act ====
Wyden joined the Senate Intelligence Committee in January 2001, and voted for the Patriot Act following the September 11 attacks. In 2006, he was one of 10 senators to vote against reauthorizing the Patriot Act.

In 2011, with the expiration of the Patriot Act approaching and efforts to reauthorize it intensifying, Wyden and Merkley sharply criticized the rush to pass the bill. Wyden said on the Senate floor, "The Patriot Act was passed a decade ago during a period of understandable fear. Now is the time to revisit this, revisit it and ensure that a better job is done of striking that balance between fighting terror and protecting individual liberty." Wyden and Merkley expressed particular concern about a provision of current law allowing law enforcement authorities to collect "a vast array of business records, emails, phone numbers, [and] even DNA from anyone deemed 'relevant' to an investigation." Wyden offered an amendment to reform the "business-records provision" of the Patriot Act, which he views as being used in an abusive and secret way.

In a Senate speech two days later, Wyden sharply criticized the use of Patriot Act, saying: "The fact is that anyone can read the plain text of the Patriot Act, and yet many members of Congress have no idea how the law is being secretly interpreted by the executive branch, because that interpretation is classified. It's almost as if there were two Patriot Acts, and many members of Congress have not read the one that matters. Our constituents, of course, are totally in the dark. Members of the public have no access to the secret legal interpretations, so they have no idea what their government believes the law actually means.

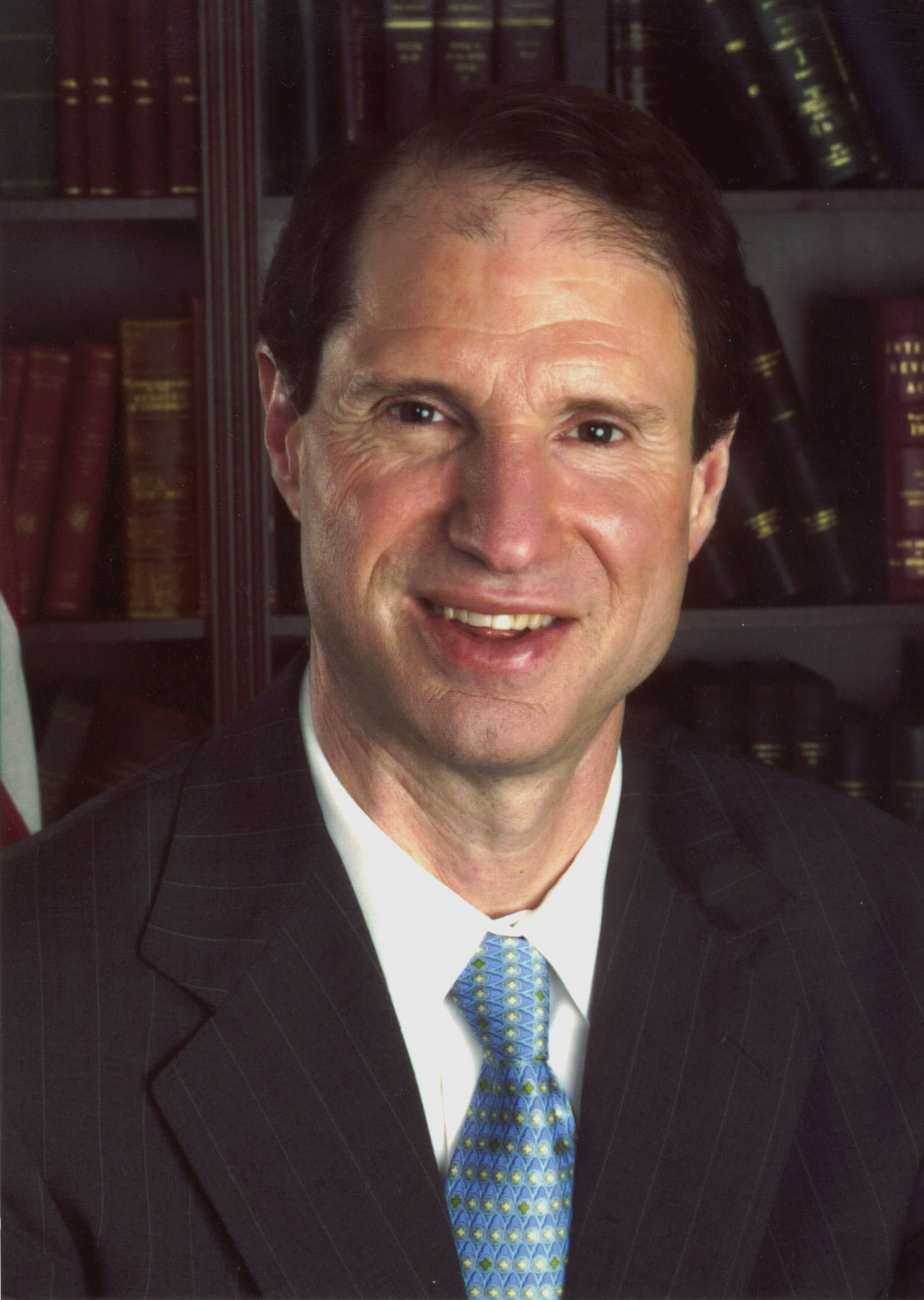
Senator Ron Wyden

In an interview for the January 2013 documentary Dirty Wars: The World is a Battlefield, Wyden was asked about legal reviews and the scope of potential assassinations (or "targeted killings") of American citizens by their government, and responded, "the American people would be extraordinarily surprised if they could see the difference between what they believe a law says and how it has actually been interpreted in secret", but that he "is not permitted" to disclose the difference publicly.

Per a 2013 Washington Post article, Wyden's concerns "stemmed from top-secret information he had learned as a member of the Senate Intelligence Committee", a position he'd held for a dozen years by 2013, but he was "bound by secrecy rules."

On March 12, 2013, during a United States Senate Select Committee on Intelligence hearing, Wyden quoted NSA director Keith B. Alexander's keynote speech at the 2012 DEF CON. Alexander had said that "Our job is foreign intelligence" and that "those who would want to weave the story that we have millions or hundreds of millions of dossiers on people, is absolutely false.... From my perspective, this is absolute nonsense." Wyden then asked James Clapper, "Does the NSA collect any type of data at all on millions or hundreds of millions of Americans?" He responded, "No, sir." Wyden asked, "It does not?" and Clapper said, "Not wittingly. There are cases where they could inadvertently, perhaps, collect, but not wittingly."

When Edward Snowden was asked during a 2014 television interview what the decisive moment was or what caused him to whistle-blow, he replied: "Sort of the breaking point was seeing the director of national intelligence, James Clapper, directly lie under oath to Congress. ... Seeing that really meant for me there was no going back."

Following news of Snowden's leaks in early June 2013, Wyden noted on June 11 that Clapper's office had been provided with the question a day in advance of the hearing and was given the opportunity following Clapper's testimony to amend his response.

=== Defense and foreign policy ===
On November 10, 2005, Wyden was one of five Senate Democrats who joined 44 Republicans in voting for Amendment no. 2516, brought to the floor by Republican senator Lindsey Graham, which ruled that enemy combatants did not have the right to Habeas Corpus.

==== Cybersecurity ====
In September 2018, Wyden was one of five senators to sign a letter to Secretary of State Mike Pompeo urging him to employ more multifactor authentication measures in order to secure the State Department's information systems and seeking answers on how the department would boost its security after the Office of Management and Budget designated the department's cyber-readiness as "high risk" as well as what the department would do to address the lack of multifactor authentication required by law and for statistics detailing the department's cyber incidents over the preceding three years.

In December 2020, in light of the 2020 United States federal government data breach, Wyden renewed calls for the introduction of mandatory security reviews for software used by federal agencies.

==== Iran ====
In 2007, Wyden and Representative Gabby Giffords sponsored the Stop Arming Iran Act, which would have barred the Defense Department from selling surplus F-14 parts and prohibited buyers who had already acquired surplus Tomcat parts from exporting them in order to prevent Iran from acquiring the parts.

In July 2017, Wyden voted for the Countering America's Adversaries Through Sanctions Act that placed sanctions on Iran, Russia and North Korea.

==== Iraq ====
Wyden was one of 23 senators to vote against the authorization of military force in Iraq in 2002. In 2003, he voted to bar excessive overseas deployments of members of the National Guard and Reserves. In 2006, Wyden was one of 13 senators to vote to require the redeployment of U.S. forces from Iraq by July 2007, and one of 39 senators to vote to call on President George W. Bush to begin withdrawing forces from Iraq and establish a timeline for withdrawal. Wyden also voted many other times for withdrawal of combat forces from Iraq, against funding for the war without binding timelines, and against the establishment of permanent military bases in Iraq. He also opposed President Barack Obama's plan for a "troop surge" in Afghanistan in 2009.

==== Israel and Palestine ====
In September 2016, in advance of a UN Security Council resolution 2334 condemning Israeli settlements in the occupied Palestinian territories, Wyden signed an AIPAC-sponsored letter urging Obama to veto "one-sided" resolutions against Israel.

In May 2017, Wyden co-sponsored the Israel Anti-Boycott Act, Senate Bill 720, which made it a federal crime, punishable by a maximum sentence of 20 years imprisonment, for Americans to encourage or participate in boycotts against Israel and Israeli settlements in the occupied Palestinian territories if protesting actions by the Israeli government. The bill would make it legal for U.S. states to refuse to do business with contractors that engage in boycotts against Israel.

==== Libya ====
In 2011, Wyden supported the no-fly zone and military intervention in Libya in order to protect civilians, saying, "The violence of Colonel [Muammar] Gaddafi against his own people is a humanitarian crisis. I support the international effort to protect the civilians of Libya." Wyden also stressed that his support was not unlimited and that he expected that the military action would be completed quickly. Along with Obama and Senator Merkley, Wyden agreed that U.S. forces should not be on the ground in Libya.

==== Myanmar ====
Wyden condemned the genocide of the Rohingya Muslim minority in Myanmar and called for a stronger response to the crisis.

==== Russia ====
In December 2010, Wyden voted for the ratification of New START, a nuclear arms reduction treaty between the U.S. and the Russian Federation obliging both countries to have no more than 1,550 strategic warheads and 700 launchers deployed during the next seven years along with providing a continuation of on-site inspections that halted when START I expired the previous year. It was the first arms treaty with Russia in eight years.

In December 2018, after United States Secretary of State Mike Pompeo announced the Trump administration was suspending its obligations in the Intermediate-Range Nuclear Forces Treaty in 60 days in the event that Russia continued to violate the treaty, Wyden was one of 26 senators to sign a letter expressing concern that the administration was "abandoning generations of bipartisan U.S. leadership around the paired goals of reducing the global role and number of nuclear weapons and ensuring strategic stability with America's nuclear-armed adversaries" and calling on Trump to continue arms negotiations.

==== Saudi Arabia ====
In March 2018, Wyden voted against tabling a resolution spearheaded by Bernie Sanders, Chris Murphy, and Mike Lee that would have required Trump to withdraw American troops either in or influencing Yemen within the next 30 days unless they were combating Al-Qaeda.

==== Syria ====
Wyden's office has questioned the CIA-led Timber Sycamore covert operation to train and arm Syrian rebels, releasing a statement that "the US is trying to build up the battlefield capabilities of the anti-Assad opposition, but they haven't provided the public with details about how this is being done, which US agencies are involved, or which foreign partners those agencies are working with."

=== Disaster relief ===
In March 2019, Wyden was one of 11 senators to sign a letter to congressional leaders urging them to "bring legislation providing disaster supplemental appropriations to your respective floors for consideration immediately" after noting that the previous year had seen 124 federal disaster declarations approved for states, territories, and tribal nations.

=== Drug policy ===
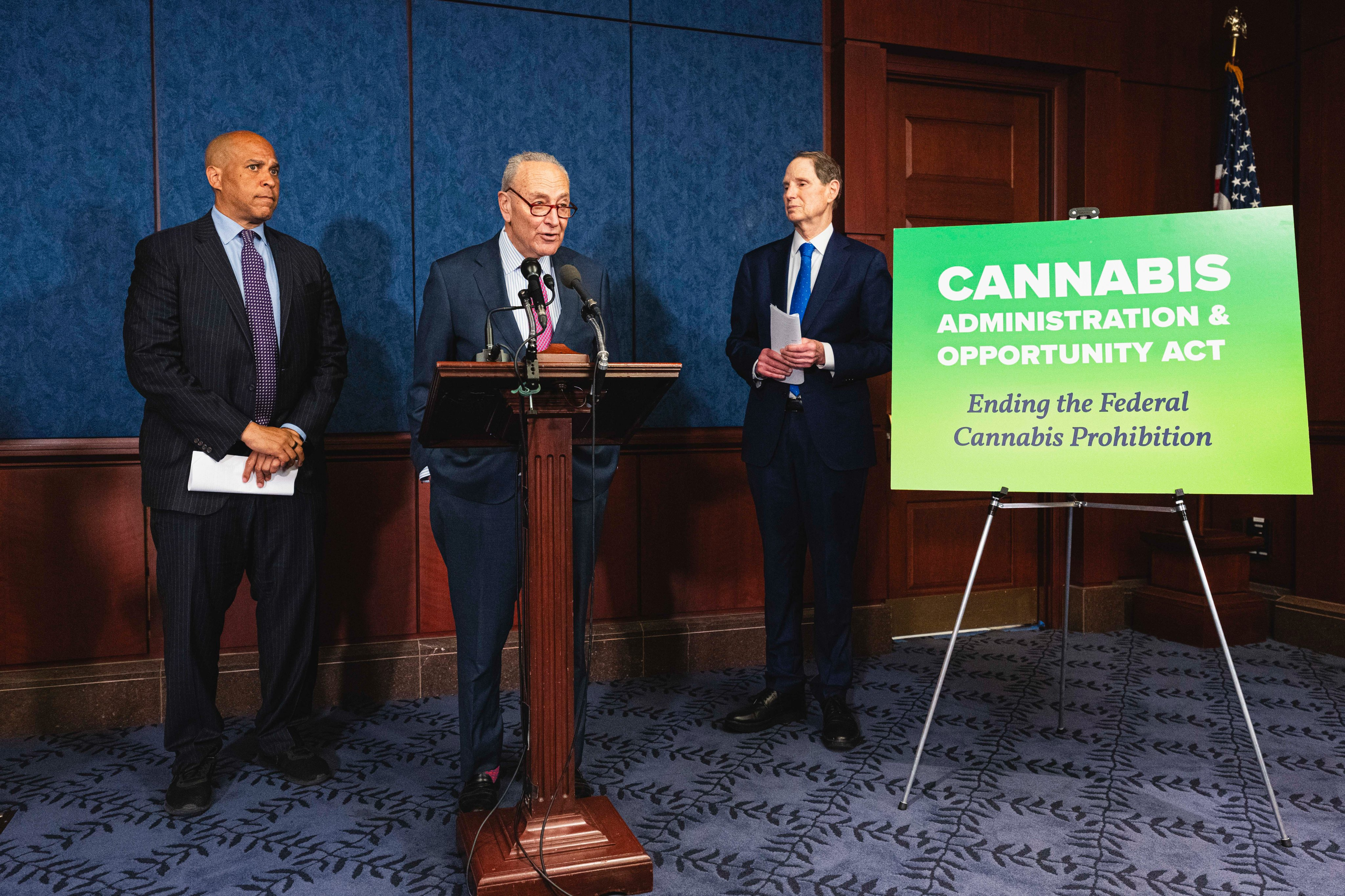
Wyden along with Senators Schumer and Booker unveil the Cannabis Administration and Opportunity Act in May 2024

Wyden has supported efforts to legalize cannabis at the federal level, cosponsoring the Marijuana Justice Act in 2017 and the Marijuana Opportunity Reinvestment and Expungement (MORE) Act in 2019. He also introduced Senate Bill 420 in 2019 to remove cannabis from the Controlled Substances Act and tax it similarly to alcohol.

In December 2018, Wyden was one of 21 senators to sign a letter to FDA Commissioner Scott Gottlieb stating their approval of the agency's actions to hinder youth access to e-cigarettes and urging the FDA "to take additional, stronger steps to prevent and reduce e-cigarette use among youth".

=== Education ===
In June 2017, Wyden, Elizabeth Warren, Mike Lee, and Tim Scott introduced legislation that would allow graduate students to allocate money from stipends and fellowships into tax-deferred individual retirement accounts (IRAs).

=== Health care ===
In 2009, Wyden sponsored the Healthy Americans Act, legislation that would institute a national system of market-based private insurance. Union interests attacked him for advocating replacement of the employer tax exclusion with a tax deduction that would apply to all Americans.

Wyden supported increasing Medicare funding, enrolling more of the uninsured in federal programs (although his Healthy Americans Act would eliminate many of these programs including Medicaid and SCHIP and replace them with private insurance), importing lower priced prescriptions from Canada, and negotiating bulk drug purchases for Medicare in order to lower costs.

In 2003, Wyden joined Senators Lindsey Graham and Trent Lott to help pass the George W. Bush administration's Medicare Prescription Drug, Improvement, and Modernization Act. The Bush administration is alleged to have forced officials to hide its true cost, which was triple its original claim. The bill has been criticized as favoring pharmaceutical companies, as it prohibits the federal government from negotiating prescription drug rates.

Not long after Tom Daschle's withdrawal as Obama's nominee for Secretary of Health and Human Services due to a scandal over his failure to pay taxes, The Oregonian reported that Wyden was being touted by many health care experts as a likely candidate for secretary-designate. Although Obama chose Kansas Governor Kathleen Sebelius instead, Wyden took advantage of the interim to reintroduce his Healthy Americans Act, with additional co-sponsorship from fellow Oregonian Democratic senator Jeff Merkley and Republican senators Lamar Alexander and Bob Bennett.

In late 2011 and early 2012, Wyden attracted attention for working with GOP House Budget Committee Chair Paul Ryan to develop a Medicare reform plan that would result in semi-privatization of the system, provoking a negative response from his Democratic allies, including Obama. The proposal would have kept traditional Medicare as an option, but would also have introduced private health insurance companies into an exchange in which they would offer competing plans to be paid for with government vouchers.

In March 2018, Wyden and Representative Frank Pallone sent a letter to Comptroller General of the United States Gene Dodaro calling for an investigation of eligibility requirements of Medicaid programs, writing, "If CMS continues to approve work requirements and other restrictions on Medicaid, the consequences could be severe for federal spending and the sustainability of the Medicaid program" and that the public "should have complete information about the consequences of proposed Section 1115 waivers to ensure limited taxpayer dollars are being used efficiently, appropriately, and towards the goal of promoting, not obstructing, access to health care."

In December 2018, Wyden was one of 42 senators to sign a letter to Trump administration officials Alex Azar, Seema Verma, and Steven Mnuchin arguing that the administration was improperly using Section 1332 of the Affordable Care Act to authorize states to "increase health care costs for millions of consumers while weakening protections for individuals with pre-existing conditions." The senators requested the administration withdraw the policy and "re-engage with stakeholders, states, and Congress."

In January 2019, during the 2018–19 United States federal government shutdown, Wyden was one of 34 senators to sign a letter to Commissioner of Food and Drugs Scott Gottlieb recognizing the FDA's efforts to address the shutdown's effect on public health and employees while remaining alarmed "that the continued shutdown will result in increasingly harmful effects on the agency’s employees and the safety and security of the nation’s food and medical products."

=== Immigration ===
In November 2018, Wyden was one of 11 senators to sign a letter to Secretary of Defense James Mattis about "the overt politicization of the military" with the Trump administration's deployment of 5,800 troops to the U.S.–Mexico border and requesting a briefing and written justification from the U.S. Northern Command for troop deployment while urging Mattis to "curb the unprecedented escalation of DOD involvement in immigration enforcement."

In January 2019, Wyden was one of 20 senators to sponsor the Dreamer Confidentiality Act, a bill that would ban the Department of Homeland Security (DHS) from passing information collected on DACA recipients to Immigration and Customs Enforcement (ICE), Customs and Border Protection (CBP), the Department of Justice, or any other law enforcement agency with exceptions in the case of fraudulent claims, national security issues, or non-immigration related felonies being investigated.

In the past, Wyden voted to continue federal funds for declared "sanctuary cities" and to declare English as the official language of the U.S. government.

=== Science and environment ===
Wyden voted for the Stem Cell Research Enhancement Act of 2005, which would change federal law to allow federal money to fund embryonic stem-cell research, ending a federal ban. He urged President Bush to sign it, saying, "I see no reason why embryonic stem-cell research should be treated any differently than other research" in terms of federal grant funding. Bush vetoed the act twice. In 2007, Wyden and Senator Gordon Smith again supported the bill.

Wyden supports environmental protection measures, and was among the minority of senators to vote against confirming the appointment of Gale Norton as Secretary of the Interior. In May 2007, he also opposed the appointment of Lyle Laverty as assistant interior secretary for fish, wildlife and parks, this time on ethical grounds.

==== Climate change ====
On April 6, 2011, Wyden voted against limiting the EPA's ability to regulate greenhouse gas emissions. On March 22, 2013, he voted against concurrent resolution creating a point of order that would make it harder for Congress to put a price on carbon. In November 2015, he voted in support of the Obama administration's Clean Power Plan.

In May 2014, in response to the National Climate Assessment, Wyden said that the "report adds to the ever-growing body of scientific evidence and on-the-ground proof that the effects of climate change are already being felt in every region of the United States". In June 2014, he said that "climate change is the most important environmental challenge of our time".

In October 2017, Wyden was one of 19 senators to sign a letter to EPA administrator Scott Pruitt, who had been appointed by Donald Trump, questioning Pruitt's decision to repeal the Clean Power Plan. The letter asserted that the repeal proposal used "mathematical sleights of hand to over-state the costs of industry compliance with the 2015 Rule and understate the benefits that will be lost if the 2017 repeal is finalized" and that denying science and fabricating math would fail to "satisfy the requirements of the law, nor will it slow the increase in frequency and intensity of extreme weather events, the inexorable rise in sea levels, or the other dire effects of global warming that our planet is already experiencing."

In November 2018, Wyden was one of 25 Democratic senators to cosponsor a resolution specifying key findings of the Intergovernmental Panel On Climate Change report and National Climate Assessment. The resolution affirmed the senators' acceptance of the findings and their support for bold action toward addressing climate change.

=== Tax policy ===
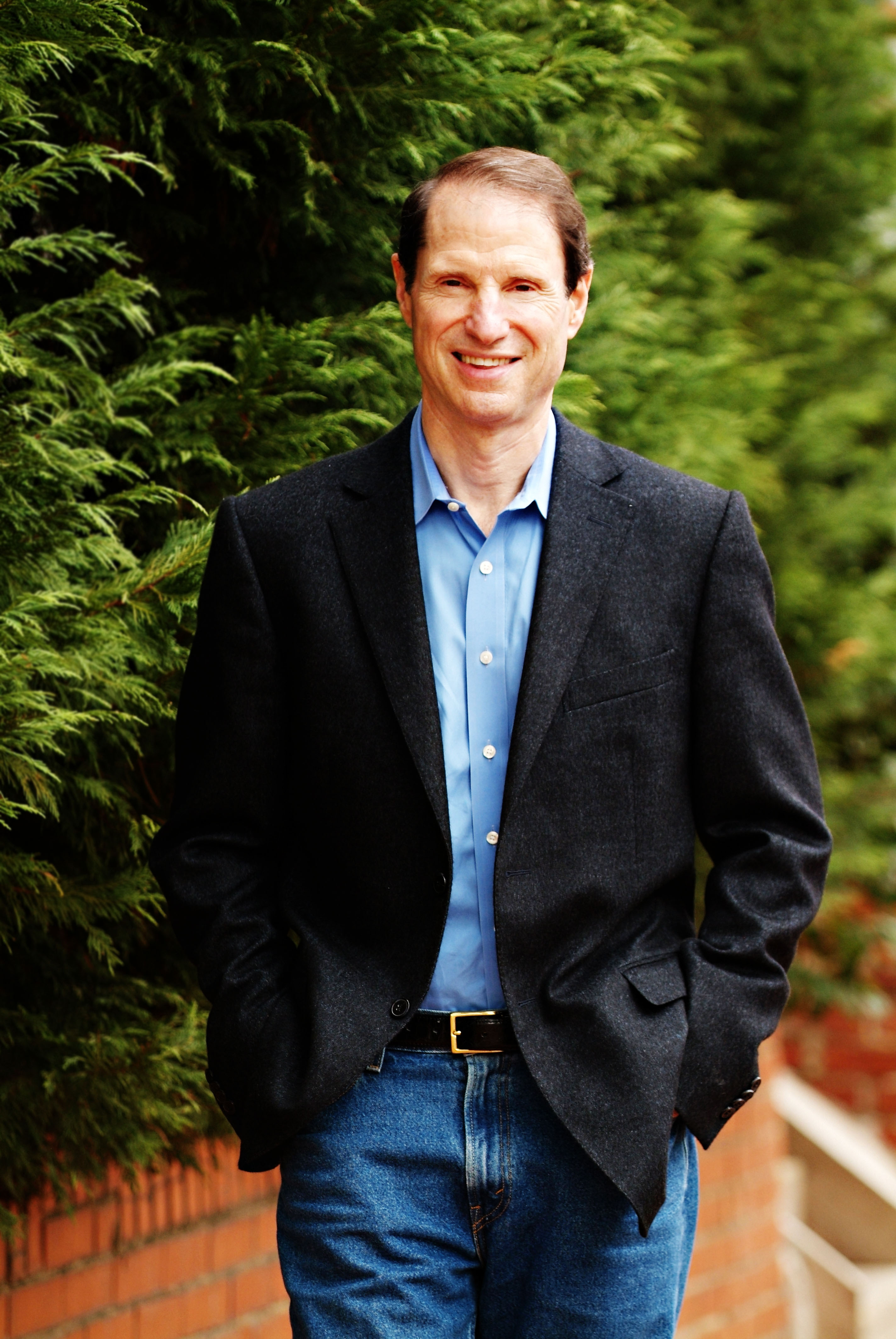
Wyden in 2005

Wyden is critical of the estate tax, which he feels is inefficient, and has voted repeatedly to abolish it. He co-authored the Internet Tax Nondiscrimination Act, which bans Internet taxes in the United States. He has also voted with Republicans to lower the capital gains tax, to encourage the study of the flat tax, and to require a 3/5 majority to raise taxes. Wyden voted against the Bush tax cuts passed in 2001 and 2003. He has also voted against the balanced budget amendment.

Wyden supports lower corporate taxes and was generally supportive of the draft proposal for deficit reduction released by the chairs of the National Commission on Fiscal Responsibility and Reform in November 2010.

Len Burman of the Tax Policy Center has praised Wyden as a legislator who "has worked tirelessly to try to advance the cause of tax reform, [despite having] few allies in this quest."

In May 2016, Wyden introduced the Presidential Tax Transparency Act, legislation requiring sitting presidents and presidential nominees to release their tax returns publicly. Wyden reintroduced the legislation in January 2019, saying in a statement, "Trump blew off a 40-year, bipartisan, pro-transparency tradition by refusing to release his tax returns—a tradition that dates all the way back to Watergate. It’s not just a matter of the president destroying a good-government campaign tradition." He called the legislation "the one-two punch needed to keep the Trump administration from stonewalling congressional oversight efforts, and ensure public transparency if Trump's tax returns get tied up in court."

In January 2019, during the 2018–19 United States federal government shutdown, Wyden sent a letter to United States Secretary of the Treasury Steven Mnuchin and Commissioner of Internal Revenue Charles P. Rettig questioning the possible "increased risk of taxpayer ID theft" in the event the lRS attempted to "maintain normal operations" during the shutdown and related concerns of his constituents "that there may be no resolution in sight".

In February 2019, Wyden, Roy Blunt, and Tammy Baldwin led nine other senators in sponsoring the Craft Beverage Modernization and Tax Reform Act, legislation imposing a reduction in excise taxes, compliance burdens, and regulations for brewers, cider makers, vintners, and distillers as part of an attempt to ensure the continued growth of the craft beverage industry.

In 2024, Wyden co-sponsored the Stop Predatory Investing Act to ban corporate investors that buy up more than 50 single-family homes from deducting interest or depreciation from their taxes on those properties.

=== Technology ===
On November 19, 2010, Wyden announced that he would take the steps necessary to put a hold on the Combating Online Infringement and Counterfeits Act (COICA) so it would not be enacted that year. If it were enacted, it would allow the Attorney General the authority to order internet providers in the U.S. to block access to websites deemed to infringe copyright. This effectively required the law to be resubmitted the next year rather than be rushed through the system at the end of the congress. Wyden said:

It seems to me that online copyright infringement is a legitimate problem, but it seems to me that COICA as written is the wrong medicine. Deploying this statute to combat online copyright infringement seems almost like using a bunker-busting cluster bomb when what you really need is a precision-guided missile. The collateral damage of this statute could be American innovation, American jobs, and a secure Internet.

In June 2011, Wyden announced his Geolocation Privacy and Surveillance Act in partnership with Representative Jason Chaffetz. The bill would establish a legal framework for the sharing and access of private tracking data by corporations, individuals, and federal agencies.

Wyden was the first politician in Congress to stand against the controversial Stop Online Piracy Act (SOPA) (in the House) and the PROTECT IP Act (PIPA) (in the Senate) on the grounds that it would "step towards an Internet in which those with money and lawyers and access to power have a greater voice than those who don't." Wyden delayed PIPA in the Senate by placing a hold on the legislation in 2010, which prevented it from being considered by the full Senate even after it was unanimously voted out of the Senate Judiciary Committee. Wyden's hold was credited with "[g]iving time for the Internet to rally against" SOPA and PIPA. With Representative Darrell Issa in the House, Wyden also introduced the Online Protection and Enforcement of Digital Trade Act as an alternative to SOPA and PIPA.

Ezra Klein wrote: "Perhaps no single member of Congress deserves as much credit for slowing the advance" of the bills than Wyden, who for much of 2010 "fought a one-man battle to keep the Senate version of the legislation from moving through on a unanimous vote." Wyden was called the "primary driver of opposition to the bill within the Senate."

When Senate leadership announced it was indefinitely postponing the bill following "massive protests" in January 2012, Wyden called it a "grassroots victory for the history books." For his role in fighting against SOPA and PIPA, The Daily Dot named Wyden one of the top ten most influential activists of 2012.

==== Algorithmic Accountability Act ====
On April 10, 2019, Wyden, Senator Cory Booker, and Representative Yvette Clarke introduced the Algorithmic Accountability Act of 2019, legislation granting additional powers to the U.S. Federal Trade Commission (FTC) in addition to forcing companies to study whether race, gender or other biases influence their technology. Wyden said in a statement that computers were "increasingly involved in the most important decisions affecting Americans’ lives" and that too frequently "algorithms depend on biased assumptions or data that can actually reinforce discrimination against women and people of color."

==== Mind Your Own Business Act ====
In October 2019, Wyden proposed The Mind Your Own Business Act to allow the FTC to issue penalties for first-time privacy violators of up to 4% of annual revenue, like the European regulation GDPR.

=== Trade and business ===
==== Bailouts ====
During the 2008 financial crisis, Wyden voted against the Emergency Economic Stabilization Act of 2008 backed by the George W. Bush administration. He did not vote on the automobile industry bailout, but said he would have voted for cloture if he had been present. Wyden added, "While I continue to have concerns about ensuring that taxpayers are protected if this loan is to occur, I believe that if the President can unwisely provide $750 billion of taxpayer money for the investment banks who took horribly unacceptable risks and helped trigger an economic collapse, we certainly have a duty to attempt to preserve a cornerstone domestic industry and the jobs of hundreds of thousands of working people whose personal actions are in no way responsible for the current economic crisis."

In early January 2009, Wyden was among several moderate Democratic senators who criticized President-elect Barack Obama's stimulus plan, calling for a greater emphasis on "tangible infrastructure investments" and warning that an effort had to be made to differentiate it from the Bush bailouts Wyden had opposed. Wyden ultimately voted for the bill and mostly voted with his party on various amendments to the bill.

==== Bankruptcy ====
Wyden voted against the Class Action Fairness Act of 2005, a Republican effort to restrict the number of class actions suits against businesses, and the Bankruptcy Abuse Prevention and Consumer Protection Act of 2005, a bipartisan change in bankruptcy law designed to make it more difficult to file for bankruptcy and to make those in bankruptcy pay more of their debts. He voted for the previous Bankruptcy Abuse Prevention and Consumer Protection Act of 2001 (S-420, substituted by amendment into H.R. 433), which contained many of the same provisions.

==== China ====
American video game company Activision Blizzard punished a Hong Kong-based professional gamer for supporting the pro-democracy 2019–20 Hong Kong protests. Many felt that Blizzard was cautious about potential repercussions from China's government, which had censored any support for the Hong Kong protests. Wyden accused Blizzard of censorship and tweeted: "Blizzard shows it is willing to humiliate itself to please the Chinese Communist Party. No American company should censor calls for freedom to make a quick buck."

==== Cuba ====
Wyden supports lifting the United States embargo against Cuba as a more viable way to reach the Cuban people. In 2016, he and Senator Byron Dorgan offered an unsuccessful amendment to end funding for TV Martí, an anti-Castro broadcasting project of the U.S. government aimed at Cuba. Dorgan and Wyden argued that the U.S. should "pull the plug on U.S. government television broadcasts to Cuba, broadcasts even the American government acknowledges Fidel Castro routinely jams and the Cuban people can't see", calling it a "complete and total waste of taxpayers' dollars" and noting that the transmissions would cost $21.1 million in the next year, but would "reach virtually no one in Cuba." The amendment was not adopted.

==== Free trade ====
Wyden supports free trade. In the House, he voted for the North American Free Trade Agreement, and he has supported many trade deals in the Senate, one of very few Democrats to vote for the Central America Free Trade Agreement. He has voted against free trade agreements with Chile, Singapore, and Oman.

Wyden supported the reimposition of tariffs on Canadian softwood lumber in 2017, saying, "Canadian policies ... distort trade and hold American lumber businesses back from fully realizing their potential."

== Personal life ==
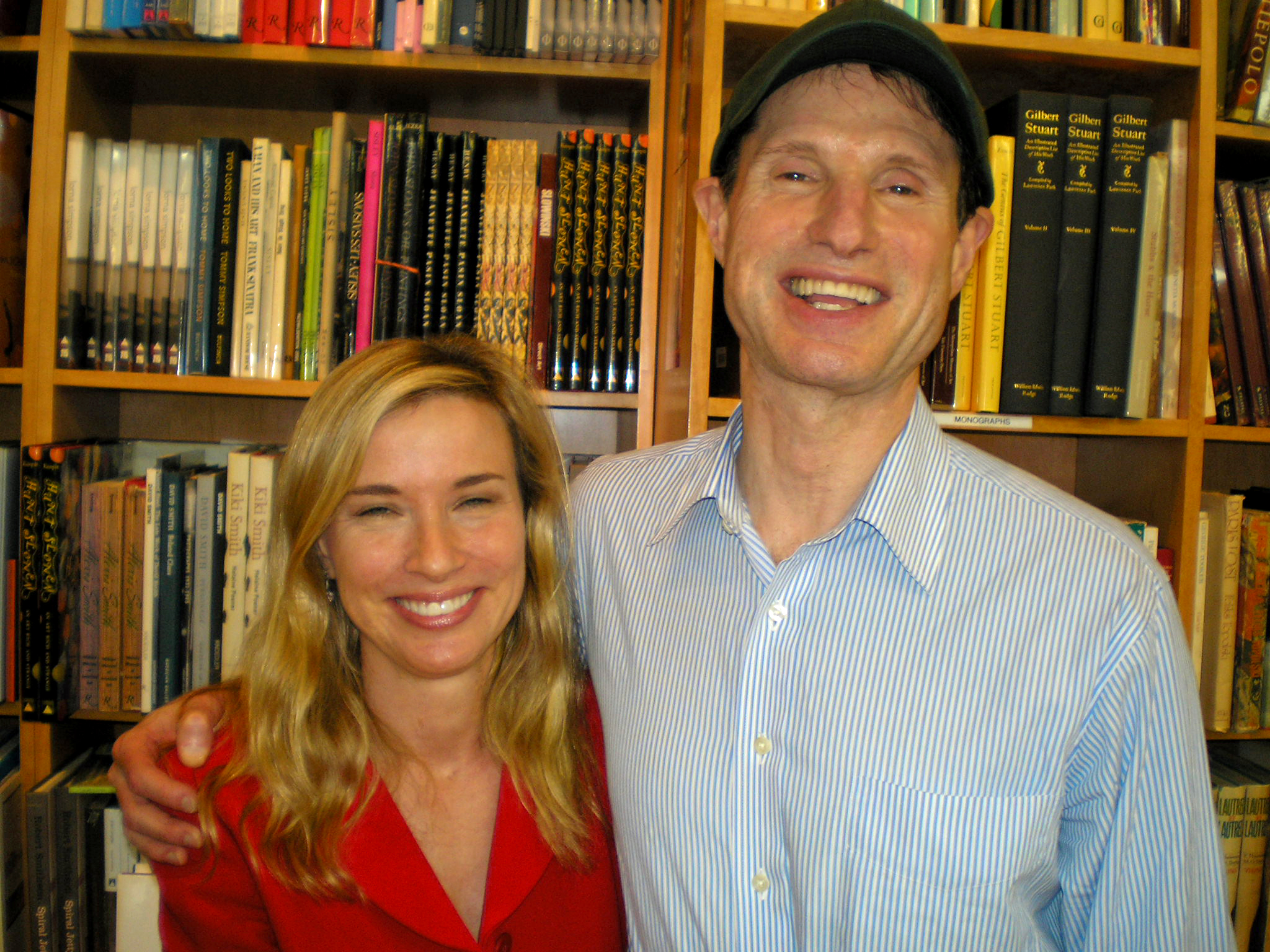
Ron Wyden and wife Nancy

Wyden's home is in Portland, Oregon, and he has an apartment in Washington, D.C. He has two grown children, Adam and Lilly, by his first wife, Laurie (née Oseran); they divorced in 1999 after 20 years of marriage. His son Adam owns the hedge fund ADW Capital Partners LP.

Wyden married his current wife, Nancy Wyden (née Bass), daughter of an owner of New York's Strand Bookstore, in September 2005. They have three children: twins born in 2007, and a daughter born in 2012. In 2016, they sold their 5,300-square-foot townhouse in Manhattan for $7.5 million. During Wyden's 2010 Senate campaign, opponents questioned how much time Wyden spent in Oregon given his wife's New York residency.

In December 2010, Wyden underwent surgery for very early-stage prostate cancer, detected during a routine screening. He recovered quickly and returned to Congress in January 2011.

== Electoral history ==
=== House elections ===
U.S. House, 3rd District of Oregon (general election)
Year	Winning candidate	Party	Pct	Opponent	Party	Pct	3rd Party	Pct
1980	Ron Wyden	Democratic	71%	Darrell R. Conger	Republican	29%	Write-in	<1%
1982	Ron Wyden (incumbent)	Democratic	78%	Thomas H. Phelan	Republican	22%	Write-in	<1%
1984	Ron Wyden (incumbent)	Democratic	72%	Drew Davis	Republican	28%	Write-in	<1%
1986	Ron Wyden (incumbent)	Democratic	85%	Thomas H. Phelan	Republican	15%	Write-in	<1%
1988	Ron Wyden (incumbent)	Democratic	100%	Unopposed			Write-in	<1%
1990	Ron Wyden (incumbent)	Democratic	80%	Phil Mooney	Republican	20%	Write-in	<1%
1992	Ron Wyden (incumbent)	Democratic	77%	Al Ritter	Republican	18%	Others	4%
1994	Ron Wyden (incumbent)	Democratic	73%	Everett Hall	Republican	19%	Others	8%

=== Senate elections ===
U.S. Senator from Oregon (Class III) (general election)
Year	Winning candidate	Party	Pct	Opponent	Party	Pct	3rd Party	Pct
1996	Ron Wyden	Democratic	48%	Gordon Smith	Republican	46%	Others	6%
1998	Ron Wyden (incumbent)	Democratic	61%	John Lim	Republican	34%	Others	5%
2004	Ron Wyden (incumbent)	Democratic	63%	Al King	Republican	32%	Others	5%
2010	Ron Wyden (incumbent)	Democratic	57%	Jim Huffman	Republican	39%	Others	3%
2016	Ron Wyden (incumbent)	Democratic	57%	Mark Callahan	Republican	33%	Others	10%
2022	Ron Wyden (incumbent)	Democratic	56%	Jo Rae Perkins	Republican	41%	Others	3%

== Publications ==
Wyden has written the following articles:

- Wyden, Ron. "Public Regulation of Private Supplements to Medicare and Medicaid in Oregon". Conn. L. Rev. 9 (1976): 450.
- Rosenstein, David I., et al. "Professional Encroachment: A Comparison of the Emergence of Denturists in Canada and Oregon". American Journal of Public Health 70.6 (1980): 614 –618.
- Wyden, Ron. "Inside Congress: A Gray Panther's View". Generations: Journal of the American Society on Aging, vol. 9, no. 1, 1984, pp. 31–32. JSTOR.
- Wyden, Ron. "Mental Illness Awareness Week". Psychiatric Services 38.10 (1987): 1037.
- Wyden, Ron, and Peter DeFazio. "The Challenge of the Twenty-First Century". Educational Gerontology: An International Quarterly 14.6 (1988): 577 –579.
- Wyden, Ron. "Using Trade Agreements to Protect the Environment". J. Envtl. L. & Litig. 7 (1992): 1.
- Wyden, Ron. "Transparency: A Prescription Against Malpractice". Public Health Reports 110.4 (1995): 380.
- Wyden, Ron, and Joshua Sheinkman. "A Road Map for Environmental Law in the Twenty-First Century: Follow the Oregon Trail". Envtl. L. 30 (2000): 35–39.
- Wyden, Ron. "Steps to improve quality of life for people who are dying". Psychology, Public Policy, and Law 6.2 (2000): 575.
- Wyden, Ron, et al. "Law and Policy Efforts to Balance Security, Privacy and Civil Liberties in Post-9/11 America". Stan. L. & Pol'y Rev. 17 (2006): 331.
- Wyden, Ron, and Bob Bennett. "Finally, Fixing Health Care: What’s Different Now?". Health Affairs 27.3 (2008): 689 –692.
- Emanuel, Ezekiel, and Ron Wyden. "A New Federal-State Partnership in Health Care: Real Power for States". JAMA 300.16 (2008): 1931 –1934.
- Wyden, Ron. "Health Care Reform is Coming". Psychological Services 6.4 (2009): 304 –307.
- Adashi, Eli Y., and Ron Wyden. "Public Reporting of Clinical Outcomes of Assisted Reproductive Technology Programs: Implications for Other Medical and Surgical Procedures". JAMA 306.10 (2011): 1135 –1136.
- Wyden, Ron, and Paul Ryan. "Guaranteed Choices to Strengthen Medicare and Health Security for All: Bipartisan Options for the Future". Washington, D.C.: US Congress. Online at www.budget.house.gov/bipartisanhealthoptions. 2011.
- Wyden, Ron, et al. "Too Many Secrets: What Washington Should Stop Hiding". Foreign Affairs, vol. 94, no. 3, 2015, pp. 114–19. JSTOR.
- Casey, Robert P., Gary C. Peters, and Ron Wyden. "COVID-19 in Nursing Homes: How the Trump Administration Failed Residents and Workers". (2020).
- Wyden, Ron. "Foreword", in Coodley, Gregg, and David Sarasohn, The Green Years, 1964–1976: When Democrats and Republicans United to Repair the Earth. University Press of Kansas, 2021. JSTOR.

== See also ==
- List of Jewish members of the United States Congress
- Election security
- List of United States senators from Oregon

U.S. House of Representatives
Preceded by Robert Duncan	Member of the U.S. House of Representatives from Oregon's 3rd congressional district 1981–1996	Succeeded by Earl Blumenauer
Party political offices
Preceded by Les AuCoin	Democratic nominee for U.S. Senator from Oregon (Class 3); 1996, 1998, 2004, 2010, 2016, 2022	Most recent
U.S. Senate
Preceded by Bob Packwood	U.S. Senator (Class 3) from Oregon; 1996–present Served alongside: Mark Hatfield, Gordon Smith, Jeff Merkley	Incumbent
Preceded by Jeff Bingaman	Chair of the Senate Energy Committee; 2013–2014	Succeeded by Mary Landrieu
Preceded by Max Baucus	Chair of the Senate Finance Committee; 2014–2015	Succeeded by Orrin Hatch
Preceded by Max Baucus	Chair of the Joint Taxation Committee; 2014–2015	Succeeded by Paul Ryan
Preceded by Orrin Hatch	Ranking Member of the Senate Finance Committee; 2015–2021	Succeeded by Mike Crapo
Preceded by Chuck Grassley	Chair of the Senate Finance Committee; 2021–2025	Succeeded by Mike Crapo
Preceded by Richard Neal	Chair of the Joint Taxation Committee; 2022–2023	Succeeded by Jason Smith
Preceded by Jason Smith	Chair of the Joint Taxation Committee; 2024–2025	Succeeded by Jason Smith
Preceded by Mike Crapo	Ranking Member of the Senate Finance Committee; 2025–present	Incumbent
U.S. order of precedence (ceremonial)
Preceded by Chuck Grassley	Order of precedence of the United States as United States Senator	Succeeded by Jack Reed
Preceded by Patty Murray	United States senators by seniority 4th	Succeeded by Dick Durbin
