= 2004 United States Senate election in Oregon =

- November 2, 2004
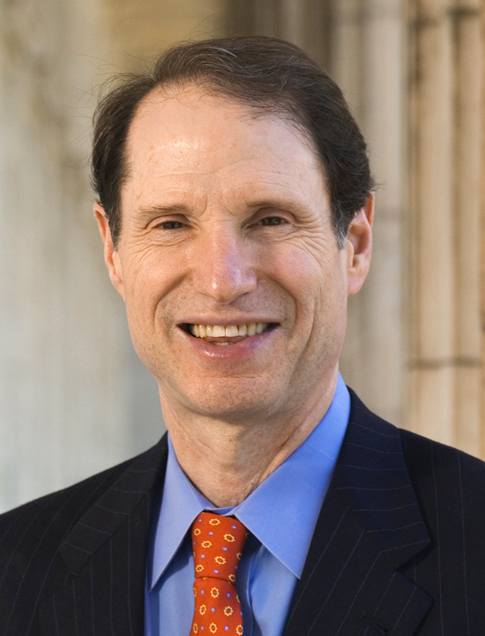

Nominee	Ron Wyden	Al King
Party	Democratic	Republican
Popular vote	1,128,728	565,254
Percentage	63.39%	31.75%
- County results Wyden: 40–50% 50–60% 60–70% 70–80% King: 40–50% 50–60%
U.S. senator before election
Ron Wyden
Democratic
Elected U.S. Senator
Ron Wyden
Democratic

The 2004 United States Senate election in Oregon was held on November 2, 2004. Incumbent Democratic U.S. Senator Ron Wyden won re-election to a second full term. As of 2026, this is the most recent U.S. Senate race in Oregon in which any Eastern Oregon counties voted for the Democratic nominee, and it is Oregon's most recent U.S. Senate race where the winning candidate won a majority of the state's counties.

== Democratic primary ==
- Ron Wyden, incumbent U.S. Senator since 1996

Wyden was unopposed in the Democratic primary.

Oregon Democratic U.S. Senate primary results
Party	Candidate	Votes	%
Democratic	Ron Wyden (Incumbent)	345,219	99.03%
	Miscellaneous	3,387	0.97%
Total votes		348,606	100.00%

== Republican primary ==
Results by county King: 20–30%; 30–40%; 40–50%; 50–60%; Abshier: 20–30%; Bowerman: 20–30%

- Al King, previous Vice Chairman of the Oregon Republican Party (2000–2002), rancher
- Bruce Broussard, perennial candidate and political activist
- Thomas Lee Abshier
- E. Bowerman
- Philip Petrie
- Pavel Goberman

Oregon Republican U.S. Senate primary results
Party	Candidate	Votes	%
Republican	Al King	85,035	35.16%
Republican	Bruce Broussard	53,084	21.95%
Republican	Thomas Lee Abshier	51,879	21.45%
Republican	E. Bowerman	18,779	7.77%
Republican	Philip Petrie	15,838	6.55%
Republican	Pavel Goberman	12,230	5.06%
	Miscellaneous	4,990	2.06%
Total votes		241,835	100.00%

== General election ==
=== Predictions ===
Source	Ranking	As of
Sabato's Crystal Ball	Safe D	November 1, 2004

=== Polling ===
Poll source	Date(s) administered	Sample size	Margin of error	Ron Wyden (D)	Al King (R)	Undecided
Research 2000	September 13–16, 2004	600 (LV)	± 4%	58%	31%	11%

=== Results ===
General election results
Party	Candidate	Votes	%	±%
Democratic	Ron Wyden (Incumbent)	1,128,728	63.39%	+2.34%
Republican	Al King	565,254	31.75%	−2.04%
Pacific Green	Teresa Keane	43,053	2.41%	+0.44%
Libertarian	Dan Fitzgerald	29,582	1.66%	+0.03%
Constitution	David Brownlow	12,397	0.70%	+0.70%
Write-In	Misc.	1,536	0.08%	−0.05%
Majority		563,474	31.64%	+5.90%
Turnout		1,780,550		
Democrat hold				

==== Counties that flipped from Democratic to Republican ====
- Grant (largest city: John Day)
- Harney (largest city: Burns)

== See also ==
- 2004 United States Senate elections
