= News-Register =

News-Register may refer to one of several newspapers, including:

- Aurora News-Register, Aurora, Nebraska
- News-Register (McMinnville), McMinnville, Oregon
- The Intelligencer and Wheeling News Register, Wheeling, West Virginia
