= 2018 Oregon Commissioner of Labor election =

2018 Oregon Commissioner of Labor and Industries election
- May 15, 2018
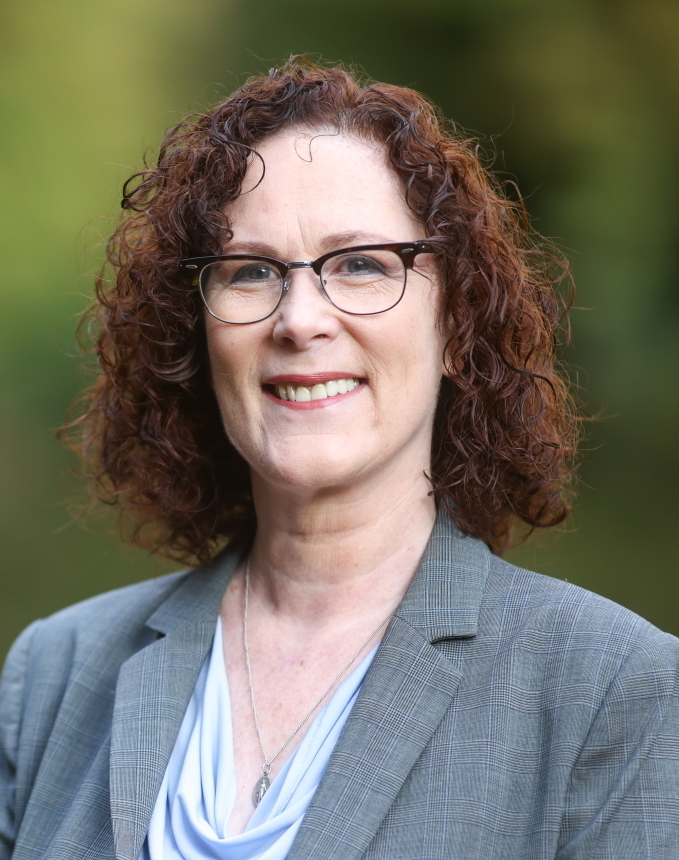

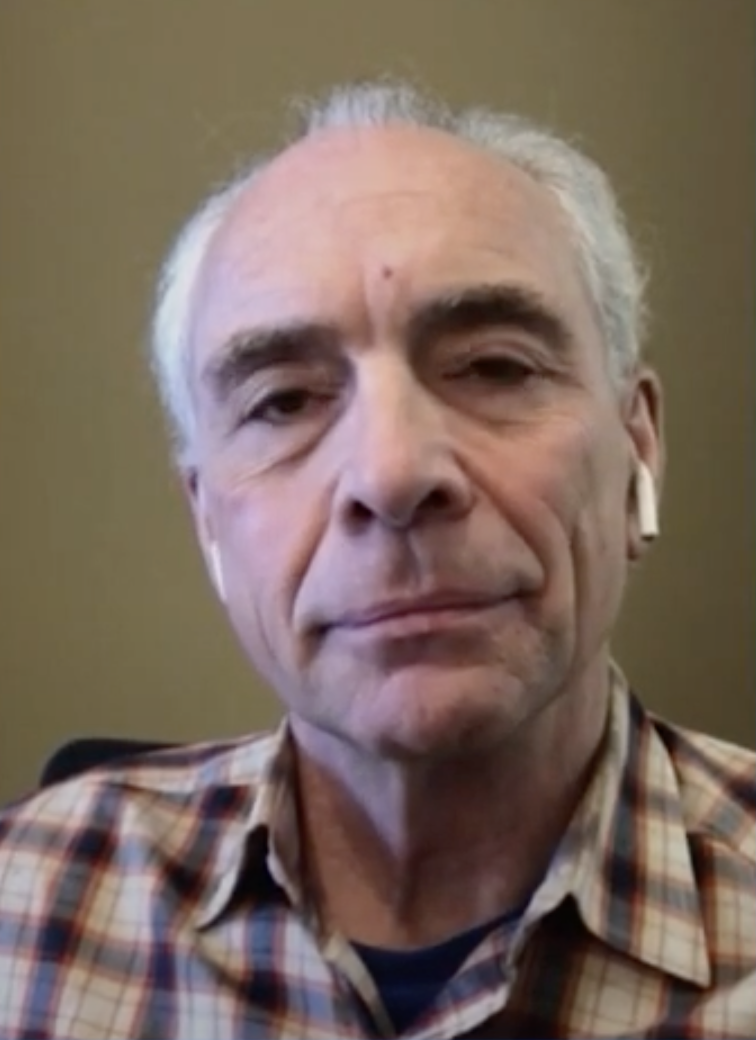

Nominee	Val Hoyle	Lou Ogden	Jack Howard
Party	Nonpartisan	Nonpartisan	Nonpartisan
Popular vote	375,762	253,977	86,477
Percentage	52.28%	35.34%	12.03%
- County results Hoyle: 40–50% 50–60% 60–70% 70–80% Ogden: 30–40% 40–50% 50–60%
Commissioner of Labor and Industries before election
Brad Avakian
Nonpartisan
Elected Commissioner of Labor and Industries
Val Hoyle
Nonpartisan

The 2018 Oregon Commissioner of Labor and Industries election was held on May 15, 2018, in order to elect the Oregon Commissioner of Labor and Industries. The election was held on a nonpartisan basis.

Incumbent Commissioner Brad Avakian did not seek reelection. Val Hoyle was elected to succeed him. Because Hoyle won a majority in the May primary election, a November runoff did not occur.

== Primary election ==
The nonpartisan primary election was held alongside partisan primary elections for other offices on May 15, 2018. Since the Commissioner of Labor is a nonpartisan role, a general election is only held if no one in the primary election secures 50% of the vote. Hoyle avoided a runoff vote and was elected to the role by winning 52.28% of the vote in the primary election.

=== Candidates ===
- Jack Howard, Union County Commissioner
- Val Hoyle, former Majority Leader of the Oregon House of Representatives
- Lou Ogden, Mayor of Tualatin

While the position of Labor Commissioner is nonpartisan, Ogden is known to be a Republican, while Howard and Hoyle are Democrats.

=== Results ===
Oregon Commissioner of Labor (primary election results)
Party	Candidate	Votes	%
Nonpartisan	Val Hoyle	375,762	52.28%
Nonpartisan	Lou Ogden	253,977	35.34%
Nonpartisan	Jack Howard	86,477	12.03%
	write-ins	2,520	0.35%
Total votes		718,736	100.00%

== See also ==
- 2018 Oregon gubernatorial election
- 2018 Oregon state elections
