= 2022 Oregon Commissioner of Labor election =

2022 Oregon Commissioner of Labor and Industries election
- November 8, 2022
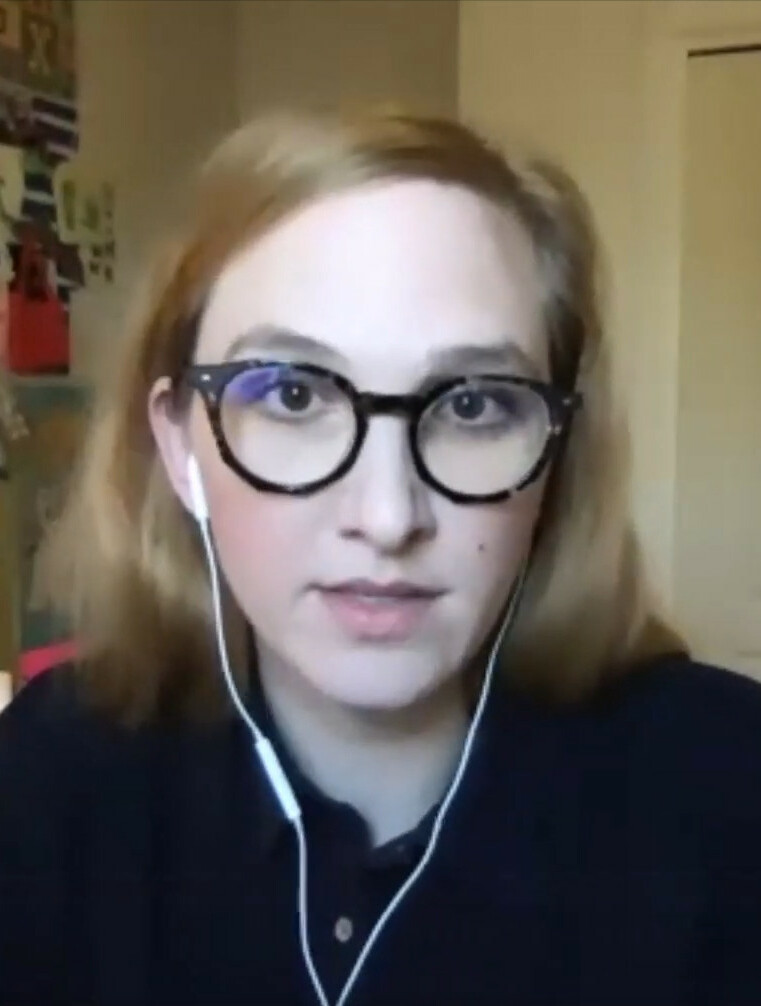

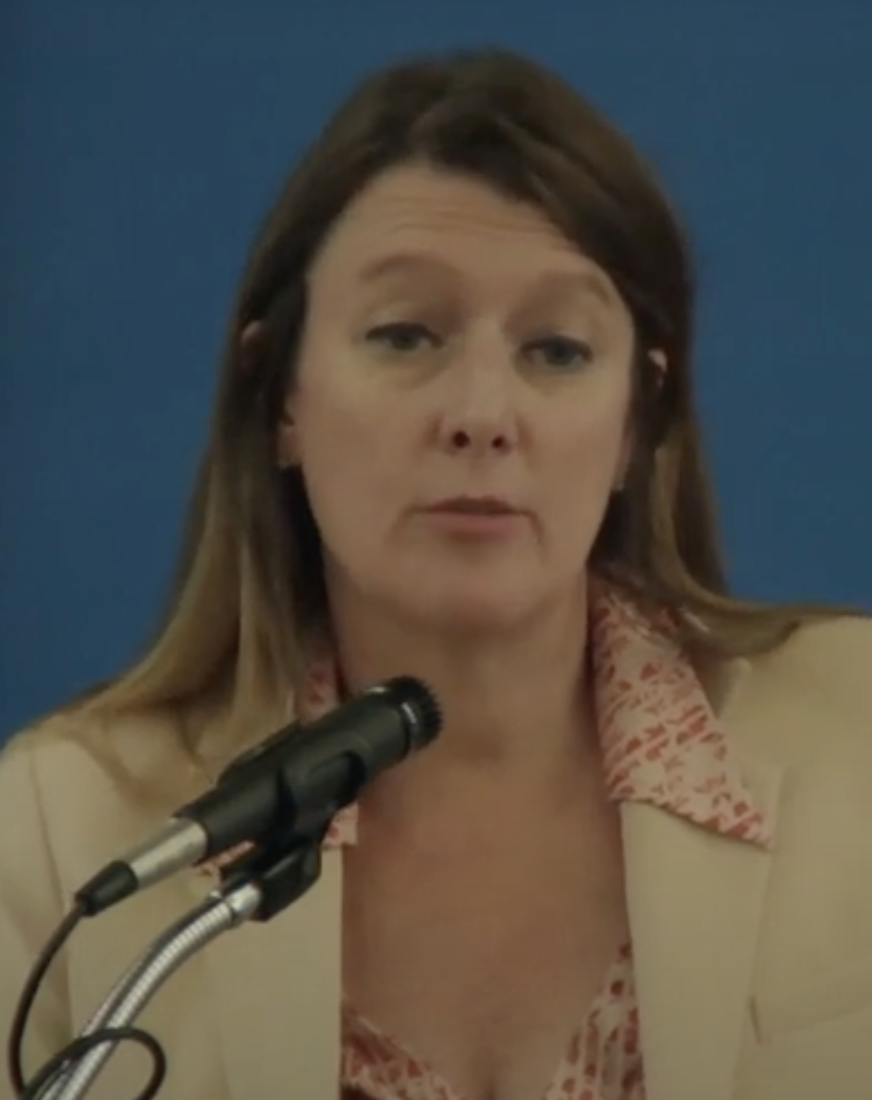
Nominee	Christina Stephenson	Cheri Helt
Popular vote	916,455	582,609
Percentage	60.74%	38.61%
- Stephenson: 50–55% 55–60% 60–65% 65–70% 70–75% 80–85% Helt: 50–55% 55–60% 60–65%
Commissioner of Labor and Industries before election
Val Hoyle
Elected Commissioner of Labor and Industries
Christina Stephenson

The 2022 Oregon Commissioner of Labor and Industries election was held on November 8, 2022, in order to elect the Oregon Commissioner of Labor and Industries. The election was held on a nonpartisan basis. Nevertheless, Christina Stephenson was favored by the Democrats while Cheri Helt was favored by the Republicans.

The primary election was held on May 17, 2022

Incumbent Commissioner Val Hoyle did not seek reelection in order to run for the U.S. House of Representatives. Christina Stephenson was decisively elected to succeed her in the November runoff, defeating former state representative Cheri Helt.

== Primary election ==
While the position of Labor Commissioner is nonpartisan, Barker, Helt, and Neuman have run for office as Republicans, while Kulla and Stephenson are Democrats. Henry is a member of the Oregon Progressive Party.

=== Candidates ===
==== Advanced to general ====
- Cheri Helt, former state representative
- Christina Stephenson, lawyer

==== Eliminated in primary ====
- Aaron Baca, reforestation company owner
- Brent Barker, real estate broker
- Casey Kulla, Yamhill County commissioner
- Robert Neuman, business manager

==== Withdrawn ====
- Chris Henry, truck driver and perennial candidate (endorsed Stephenson; remained on ballot)

=== Results ===
Primary results by county: Christina Stephenson: 65–70% 55–60% 50–55% 45–50% 40–45% 35–40% 30–35% 25–30%; Cheri Helt: 35–40% 30–35% 25–30%; Casey Kulla: 35–40%

Nonpartisan election primary results
Candidate	Votes	%
Christina Stephenson	421,619	47.17%
Cheri Helt	171,168	19.15%
Casey Kulla	126,036	14.10%
Brent Barker	101,576	11.36%
Robert Neuman	32,331	3.62%
Chris Henry	22,936	2.57%
Aaron Baca	14,217	1.59%
Write-in	3,922	0.44%
Total votes	893,805	100.00%

== Runoff ==
=== Campaign ===
Although the position is officially nonpartisan, Stephenson was endorsed by Democratic Party officials, including gubernatorial nominee Tina Kotek and incumbent commissioner Val Hoyle. Helt was endorsed by Republican gubernatorial nominee Christine Drazan and independent gubernatorial candidate Betsy Johnson.

=== Results ===
Runoff results
Candidate	Votes	%
Christina Stephenson	916,455	60.74%
Cheri Helt	582,609	38.61%
Write-in	9,826	0.65%
Total votes	1,508,890	100.00%

==== By county ====
County	Christina Stephenson Democratic		Cheri Helt Republican		Write-in Various		Margin		Total
County	#	%	#	%	#	%	#	%	Total
Baker	2,911	44.31%	3,611	54.96%	48	0.73%	-700	-10.65%	6,570
Benton	24,969	69.87%	10,526	29.45%	243	0.68%	14,443	40.41%	35,738
Clackamas	92,011	56.97%	68,692	42.53%	807	0.50%	23,319	14.44%	161,510
Clatsop	9,077	61.00%	5,728	38.49%	76	0.51%	3,349	22.51%	14,881
Columbia	11,021	50.99%	10,421	48.21%	173	0.80%	600	2.78%	21,615
Coos	11,580	49.14%	11,841	50.24%	146	0.62%	-261	-1.11%	23,567
Crook	3,902	35.62%	6,935	63.32%	116	1.06%	-3,033	-27.69%	10,953
Curry	4,888	50.90%	4,647	48.39%	69	0.72%	241	2.51%	9,604
Deschutes	44,867	49.16%	46,050	50.45%	356	0.39%	-1,183	-1.30%	91,273
Douglas	17,709	45.23%	21,047	53.75%	400	1.02%	-3,338	-8.52%	39,156
Gilliam	311	44.05%	393	55.67%	2	0.28%	-82	-11.61%	706
Grant	1,178	39.23%	1,786	59.47%	39	1.30%	-608	-20.25%	3,003
Harney	1,013	37.87%	1,637	61.20%	25	0.93%	-624	-23.33%	2,675
Hood River	5,613	68.11%	2,580	31.31%	48	0.58%	3,033	36.80%	8,241
Jackson	40,637	53.45%	34,954	45.97%	441	0.58%	5,683	7.47%	76,032
Jefferson	3,410	43.00%	4,458	56.22%	62	0.78%	-1,048	-13.22%	7,930
Josephine	13,570	42.53%	18,103	56.74%	233	0.73%	-4,533	-14.21%	31,906
Klamath	8,515	39.86%	12,690	59.41%	156	0.73%	-4,175	-19.54%	21,361
Lake	1,135	38.58%	1,777	60.40%	30	1.02%	-642	-21.82%	2,942
Lane	88,088	64.85%	46,549	34.27%	1,194	0.88%	41,539	30.58%	135,831
Lincoln	13,389	64.50%	7,270	35.02%	100	0.48%	6,119	29.48%	20,759
Linn	21,857	46.60%	24,592	52.44%	450	0.96%	-2,735	-5.83%	46,899
Malheur	2,946	42.13%	4,010	57.34%	37	0.53%	-1,064	-15.22%	6,993
Marion	54,709	54.34%	45,270	44.97%	697	0.69%	9,439	9.38%	100,676
Morrow	1,264	40.49%	1,843	59.03%	15	0.48%	-579	-18.55%	3,122
Multnomah	240,296	80.26%	57,487	19.20%	1,617	0.54%	182,809	61.06%	299,400
Polk	17,890	54.83%	14,500	44.44%	240	0.74%	3,390	10.39%	32,630
Sherman	252	35.49%	455	64.08%	3	0.42%	-203	-28.59%	710
Tillamook	6,232	58.31%	4,360	40.79%	96	0.90%	1,872	17.51%	10,688
Umatilla	7,838	40.13%	11,596	59.37%	98	0.50%	-3,758	-19.24%	19,532
Union	4,018	42.39%	5,389	56.86%	71	0.75%	-1,371	-14.47%	9,478
Wallowa	1,430	42.08%	1,945	57.24%	23	0.68%	-515	-15.16%	3,398
Wasco	4,619	53.66%	3,939	45.76%	50	0.58%	680	7.90%	8,608
Washington	132,645	66.45%	65,576	32.85%	1,398	0.70%	67,069	33.60%	199,619
Wheeler	207	36.57%	355	62.72%	4	0.71%	-148	-26.15%	566
Yamhill	20,458	50.74%	19,597	48.61%	263	0.65%	861	2.14%	40,318
Totals	916,455	60.74%	582,609	38.61%	9,826	0.65%	333,846	22.13%	1,508,890

==== By congressional district ====
Stephenson won five of six congressional districts, including one that elected a Republican.

District	Stephenson	Helt	Representative
1st	69%	30%	Suzanne Bonamici
2nd	45%	54%	Cliff Bentz
3rd	75%	25%	Earl Blumenauer
4th	61%	38%	Peter DeFazio (117th Congress)
4th	61%	38%	Val Hoyle (118th Congress)
5th	55%	44%	Kurt Schrader (117th Congress)
5th	55%	44%	Lori Chavez-DeRemer (118th Congress)
6th	59%	41%	Andrea Salinas

== See also ==
- 2022 Oregon state elections
