= 2026 Oregon Commissioner of Labor election =

2026 Oregon Commissioner of Labor and Industries election
- May 19, 2026
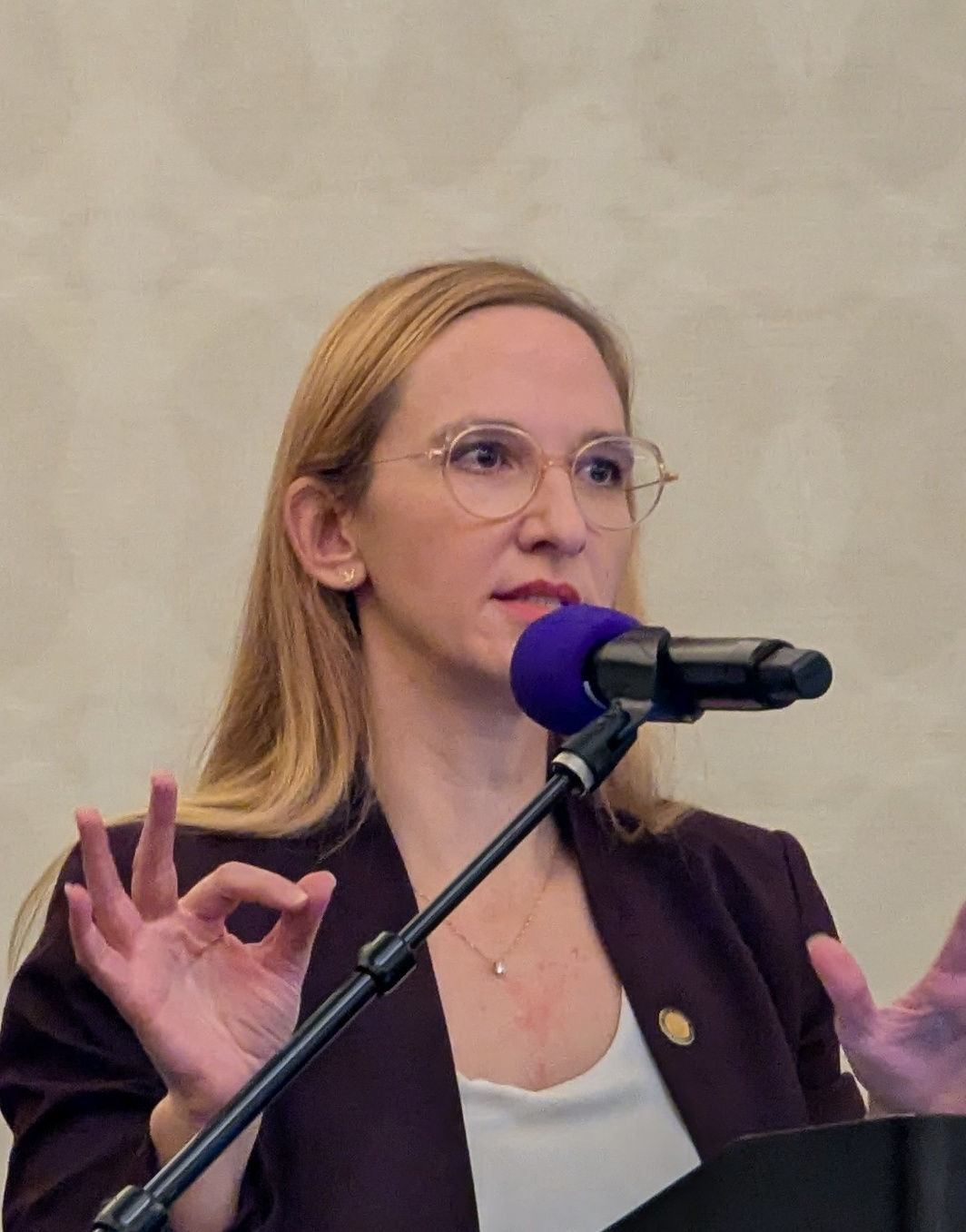

Candidate	Christina Stephenson	Chris Lynch
Popular vote	595,583	341,903
Percentage	63.22%	36.29%
- County results Stephenson: 50–60% 60–70% 70–80% Lynch: 40–50% 50–60% 60–70%
Commissioner of Labor and Industries before election
Christina Stephenson
Elected Commissioner of Labor and Industries
Christina Stephenson

The 2026 Oregon Commissioner of Labor election was held on May 19, 2026, to elect the Oregon Commissioner of Labor and Industries, one of five statewide elected offices. Incumbent commissioner Christina Stephenson won re-election to a second term. The election is officially nonpartisan, though candidates can affiliate with a political party.

Commissioner Stephenson was favored to win reelection, yet she managed to outperform her electoral success in November 2022. Although the office is formally nonpartisan, Stephenson, a Democrat, managed to carry over half of Oregon's counties in her reelection campaign, even outright winning Josephine County, as well as flipping Coos and Deschutes counties, which she narrowly lost four years earlier. Despite losing them, she also fell just one vote short of flipping Wallowa County and just 87 votes short of flipping Baker County. Stephenson has become the first Democrat or Democratic-endorsed candidate in any contested statewide election to carry Josephine County, and to carry a majority of the Beaver State's counties, since 2004. It also marks the strongest performance of any Democrat or Democratic-endorsed candidate in any Eastern Oregon counties in a contested statewide race since then.

== Candidates ==
=== Declared ===
- Chris Lynch, former bureau of labor and industries investigator
- Christina Stephenson, incumbent commissioner (2022–present)

=== Endorsements ===
Christina Stephenson

Political Parties

- Oregon Working Families Party

Newspapers

- The Oregonian

== Results ==
2026 Oregon Commissioner of Labor election
Candidate	Votes	%
Christina Stephenson (incumbent)	595,583	63.22
Chris Lynch	341,903	36.29
Write-in	4,535	0.49
Total votes	942,021	100.00

=== By county ===
County	Christina Stephenson Democratic		Chris Lynch Nonpartisan		Write-in Various		Margin		Total
County	#	%	#	%	#	%	#	%	Total
Baker	2,233	48.92%	2,320	50.82%	12	0.26%	-87	-1.91%	4,565
Benton	16,234	71.99%	6,222	27.59%	93	0.41%	10,012	44.40%	22,549
Clackamas	61,217	60.71%	39,268	38.95%	344	0.34%	21,949	21.77%	100,829
Clatsop	6,336	63.96%	3,534	35.68%	36	0.36%	2,802	28.29%	9,906
Columbia	7,302	53.05%	6,300	45.77%	162	1.18%	1,002	7.28%	13,764
Coos	8,760	53.72%	7,460	45.75%	86	0.53%	1,300	7.97%	16,306
Crook	3,278	44.28%	4,077	55.07%	48	0.65%	-799	-10.79%	7,403
Curry	3,598	56.87%	2,689	42.50%	40	0.63%	909	14.37%	6,327
Deschutes	37,630	65.20%	19,906	34.49%	182	0.32%	17,724	30.71%	57,718
Douglas	12,338	47.53%	13,400	51.62%	223	0.86%	-1,062	-4.09%	25,961
Gilliam	247	45.91%	289	53.72%	2	0.37%	-42	-7.81%	538
Grant	801	39.95%	1,186	59.15%	18	0.90%	-385	-19.20%	2,005
Harney	776	39.45%	1,177	59.84%	14	0.71%	-401	-20.39%	1,967
Hood River	4,678	72.49%	1,740	26.96%	35	0.54%	2,938	45.53%	6,453
Jackson	28,432	59.72%	18,977	39.86%	196	0.41%	9,455	19.86%	47,605
Jefferson	2,580	48.51%	2,699	50.74%	40	0.75%	-119	-2.24%	5,319
Josephine	10,281	54.21%	8,616	45.43%	67	0.35%	1,665	8.78%	18,964
Klamath	7,172	46.12%	8,307	53.42%	71	0.46%	-1,135	-7.30%	15,550
Lake	815	38.46%	1,277	60.26%	27	1.27%	-462	-21.80%	2,119
Lane	62,272	66.63%	30,650	32.79%	542	0.58%	31,622	33.83%	93,464
Lincoln	9,269	66.12%	4,686	33.43%	64	0.46%	4,583	32.69%	14,019
Linn	14,745	48.61%	15,364	50.65%	222	0.73%	-619	-2.04%	30,331
Malheur	2,002	45.54%	2,377	54.07%	17	0.39%	-375	-8.53%	4,396
Marion	36,989	55.45%	29,359	44.01%	358	0.54%	7,630	11.44%	66,706
Morrow	941	45.07%	1,122	53.74%	25	1.20%	-181	-8.67%	2,088
Multnomah	128,675	79.45%	32,819	20.26%	462	0.29%	95,856	59.19%	161,956
Polk	12,691	56.26%	9,732	43.14%	134	0.59%	2,959	13.12%	22,557
Sherman	188	40.34%	276	59.23%	2	0.43%	-88	-18.88%	466
Tillamook	4,611	57.42%	3,367	41.93%	53	0.66%	1,244	15.49%	8,031
Umatilla	5,585	47.71%	6,058	51.75%	63	0.54%	-473	-4.04%	11,706
Union	3,137	46.88%	3,524	52.66%	31	0.46%	-387	-5.78%	6,692
Wallowa	1,396	49.77%	1,397	49.80%	12	0.43%	-1	-0.04%	2,805
Wasco	3,411	55.60%	2,701	44.03%	23	0.37%	710	11.57%	6,135
Washington	78,540	67.73%	36,728	31.67%	692	0.60%	41,812	36.06%	115,960
Wheeler	155	38.18%	246	60.59%	5	1.23%	-91	-22.41%	406
Yamhill	16,268	57.17%	12,053	42.36%	134	0.47%	4,215	14.81%	28,455
Totals	595,583	63.22%	341,903	36.29%	4,535	0.49%	253,680	26.93%	942,021

== See also ==
- 2026 Oregon elections
