= 2022 Oregon elections =

US General Election

- November 8, 2022

A general election was held in the U.S. state of Oregon on November 8, 2022. Primary elections were held on May 17, 2022.

== Federal ==
=== United States Senate ===
Incumbent Democratic senator Ron Wyden won re-election to a fifth term. Wyden was first elected in a 1996 special election and reelected in 1998, 2004, 2010, and 2016.

Six other candidates, including Republican nominee Jo Rae Perkins, ran.

=== United States House of Representatives ===
All five of Oregon's seats in the United States House of Representatives were up for re-election in 2022, as well as a sixth seat it gained due to the 2020 census. These seats were represented by four Democrats and one Republican.

== Governor ==
Incumbent Democratic governor Kate Brown took office on February 18, 2015, upon the resignation of John Kitzhaber. She was subsequently elected in the gubernatorial special election in 2016 and was re-elected to a full term in 2018. She is term-limited and cannot seek re-election to a second full term until 2026.

An unprecedented 34 candidates ran in the primary elections with the eventual nominees being Democrat Tina Kotek, former speaker of the Oregon House of Representatives, and Republican Christine Drazan, the former minority leader of the Oregon House of Representatives. Former Democratic state senator Betsy Johnson ran as an independent. Other notable candidates included State Treasurer Tobias Read (D), former state Representative Bob Tiernan (R), 2016 Republican nominee Bud Pierce, and Sandy Mayor Stan Pulliam (R). Pulitzer Prize-winning journalist Nicholas Kristof announced a run, but was declared ineligible by the Oregon Secretary of State's office, due to the state's residency requirements.

== Labor Commissioner ==
Incumbent Val Hoyle decided not to run for a second term, instead running for Oregon's 4th congressional district, which was being vacated by retiring incumbent Peter DeFazio. Since the commissioner of labor is a nonpartisan role, a general election is only held in the event that no one in the primary election secures 50% of the vote.

Seven candidates ran in the primary, with civil rights attorney Christina Stephenson and former state Representative Cheri Helt facing off in a runoff election. Stephenson defeated Helt.

== Legislature ==
All 60 seats in the Oregon House of Representatives were up for election, as were 15 of the 30 seats in the Oregon State Senate.

== Ballot measures ==
There were four statewide Oregon ballot measures on the general election ballot. As a result of the election, all four measures passed.

=== Results ===
Measure	Description	Votes	
Measure	Description	Yes	No
Measure 111	Amends Constitution: State must ensure affordable healthcare access, balanced against requirement to fund schools, other essential services	951,446 (50.73%)	924,231 (49.27%)
Measure 112	Amends Constitution: Removes language allowing slavery and involuntary servitude as punishment for crime	1,047,028 (55.59%)	836,295 (44.41%)
Measure 113	Amends Constitution: Legislators with ten unexcused absences from floor sessions disqualified from holding next term of office	1,292,127 (68.32%)	599,204 (31.68%)
Measure 114	Requires permit to acquire firearms; police maintain permit/firearm database; criminally prohibits certain ammunition magazines	975,862 (50.65%)	950,891 (49.35%)
