= 2012 Oregon Commissioner of Labor election =

2012 Oregon Commissioner of Labor and Industries election
- November 6, 2012
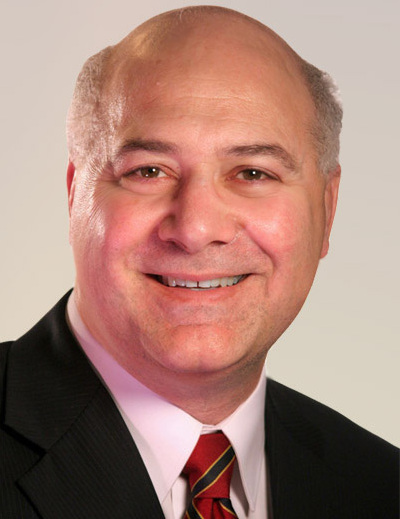

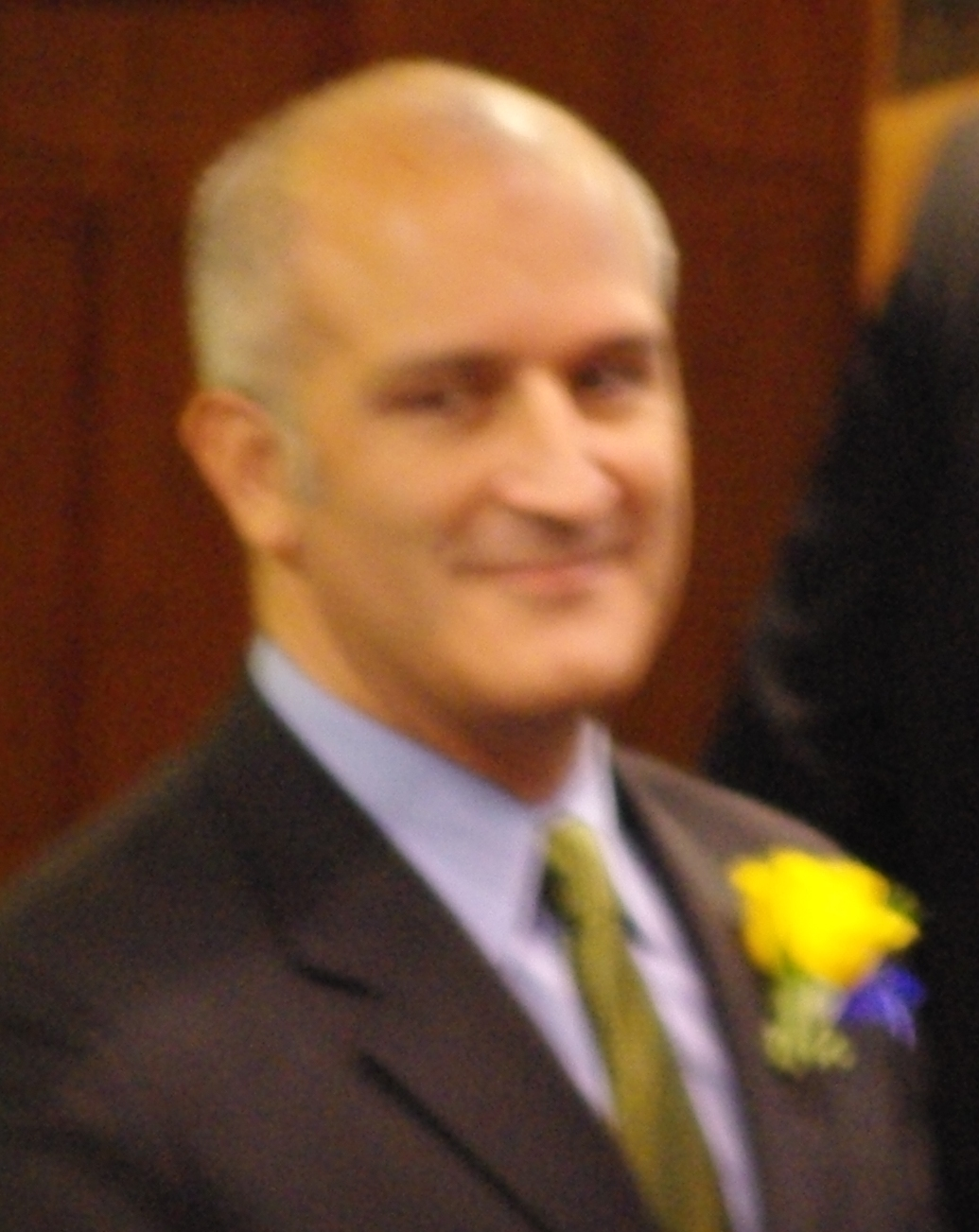
Nominee	Brad Avakian	Bruce Starr
Party	Nonpartisan	Nonpartisan
Popular vote	681,987	606,735
Percentage	52.53%	46.73%
- Avakian: 45–50% 50–55% 55–60% 65–70% Starr: 50–55% 55–60% 60–65% 65–70% 70–75%
Commissioner of Labor and Industries before election
Brad Avakian
Elected Commissioner of Labor and Industries
Brad Avakian

The 2012 Oregon Commissioner of Labor and Industries election was held on November 6, 2012, in order to elect the Oregon Commissioner of Labor and Industries. The election was held on a nonpartisan basis.

Incumbent Commissioner Brad Avakian was re-elected, defeating State Senator Bruce Starr.

== Candidates ==
- Brad Avakian, incumbent Labor Commissioner
- Bruce Starr, state senator

While the position of Labor Commissioner is nonpartisan, Avakian is a Democrat and Starr is a Republican.

== General election ==
=== Polling ===
Poll source	Date(s) administered	Sample size	Margin of error	Brad Avakian (D)	Bruce Starr (R)	Undecided
The Oregonian	October 25–28, 2012	405	± 5%	26%	20%	53%
DHM Research	October 18–20, 2012	500	± 2.6%–4.4%	22%	19%	60%
Public Policy Polling	June 21–24, 2012	686	± 3.7%	21%	23%	56%

=== Campaign ===
Starr announced he would challenge incumbent Avakian in December 2011. Avakian officially announced his re-election campaign in February 2012.

While the Labor Commissioner is normally elected during the statewide primary election in May, with a runoff between the two highest-placing candidates in November if no candidate receives 50% of the vote, no primary election was held with Avakian and Starr instead facing off in the November general election. According to Secretary of State Kate Brown, "an obscure state law that applies only in 2012 require[d] that the labor commissioner be chosen in November." Starr challenged the change in date in court, which was subsequently rejected.

=== Results ===
General election results
Party	Candidate	Votes	%
Nonpartisan	Brad Avakian	681,987	52.53%
Nonpartisan	Bruce Starr	606,735	46.73%
	write-ins	9,616	0.74%
Total votes		1,298,338	100.00%

==== By congressional district ====
Despite losing the state, Starr won three of five congressional districts, including two that elected Democrats.

District	Avakian	Starr	Representative
1st	54%	46%	Suzanne Bonamici
2nd	42%	58%	Greg Walden
3rd	67%	33%	Earl Blumenauer
4th	49%	51%	Peter DeFazio
5th	49%	51%	Kurt Schrader

== See also ==
- 2012 Oregon state elections
