= Labor commissioner =

A labor commissioner is a public official in the executive branch of a state or territory in the United States. Their general role is to oversee the administration of state laws relating to labor and the workforce.

All 50 states have labor commissioners. In four states – Georgia, North Carolina, Oklahoma and Oregon – labor commissioners are elected statewide. Oregon elects labor commissioners in nonpartisan elections, while the other three states have partisan elections. In the other 46 states, labor commissioners are nonpartisan and appointed. In Nevada and West Virginia, two separate appointed offices divide the responsibilities of the labor commissioner, while in Texas, there are three labor commissioners on the Texas Workforce Commission.

The National Association of Government Labor Officials is a bipartisan association of labor commissioners.

== List of current labor commissioners ==
As of September 22, 2026, the various labor commissioners are:

Office	Name	Elected/Appointed
Alabama Commissioner of Labor	Marty Redden	Appointed
Alaska Commissioner of Labor and Workforce Development	Catherine Muñoz	Appointed
Director of the Industrial Commission of Arizona	Gaetano Testini	Appointed
Arkansas Director of Labor	Daryl Bassett	Appointed
California Director of Industrial Relations	Katrina Hagen	Appointed
Colorado Executive Director of Labor and Employment	Joe Barela	Appointed
Connecticut Commissioner of Labor	Danté Bartolomeo	Appointed
Delaware Secretary of Labor	Karryl Hubbard	Appointed
Florida Secretary of Economic Opportunity	Vacant	Appointed
Georgia Commissioner of Labor	Bárbara Rivera Holmes	Elected (partisan)
Hawaii Director of Labor and Industrial Relations	Jade Butay	Appointed
Idaho Director of Labor	Jani Revier	Appointed
Illinois Director of Labor	Jane Flanagan	Appointed
Indiana Commissioner of Labor	David Redden	Appointed
Iowa Commissioner of Labor	Rod Roberts	Appointed
Kansas Secretary of Labor	Amber Shultz	Appointed
Kentucky Secretary of Labor Cabinet	Jamie Link	Appointed
Louisiana Executive Director of the Workforce Commission	Susana Schowen	Appointed
Maine Commissioner of Labor	Laura Fortman	Appointed
Maryland Secretary of Labor, Licensing, and Regulation	Portia Wu	Appointed
Massachusetts Secretary of Labor and Workforce Development	Lauren Jones	Appointed
Michigan Director of Licensing and Regulatory Affairs	Marlon Brown	Appointed
Minnesota Commissioner of Labor and Industry	Nicole Blissenbach	Appointed
Mississippi Executive Director of Employment Security	Robin Stewart	Appointed
Missouri Director of Labor and Industrial Relations	Anna Hui	Appointed
Montana Commissioner of Labor and Industry	Sarah Swanson	Appointed
Nebraska Commissioner of Labor	Katie Thurber	Appointed
Nevada Commissioner of Labor	Shannon Chambers	Appointed
Nevada Director of Employment, Training, and Rehabilitation	Chris Sewell	Appointed
New Hampshire Commissioner of Labor	Ken Merrifield	Appointed
New Jersey Commissioner of Labor and Workforce Development	Robert Asaro-Angelo	Appointed
New York Commissioner of Labor	Roberta Reardon	Appointed
North Carolina Commissioner of Labor	Luke Farley	Elected (partisan)
North Dakota Commissioner of Labor	Nathan Svihovec	Appointed
Ohio Superintendent of Industrial Compliance and Labor	Robb Coventry	Appointed
Oklahoma Commissioner of Labor	Leslie Osborn	Elected (partisan)
Oregon Commissioner of Labor and Industries	Christina Stephenson	Elected (nonpartisan)
Pennsylvania Secretary of Labor and Industry	Nancy A. Walker	Appointed
Rhode Island Director of Labor	Matthew Weldon	Appointed
South Carolina Director of Labor, Licensing, and Regulation	Emily Farr	Appointed
South Dakota Secretary of Labor and Regulation	Marcia Hultman	Appointed
Tennessee Commissioner of Labor and Workforce Development	Deniece Thomas	Appointed
Texas Workforce Commission	Bryan Daniel	Appointed
Texas Workforce Commission	Joe Esparza	Appointed
Texas Workforce Commission	Alberto Trevino	Appointed
Utah Commissioner of Labor	Jaceson Maughan	Appointed
Vermont Commissioner of Labor	Michael Harrington	Appointed
Virginia Commissioner of Labor and Industry	Gary Pan	Appointed
Washington Director of Labor and Industries	Joel Sacks	Appointed
West Virginia Commissioner of Labor	Mitchell Woodrum	Appointed
West Virginia Secretary of Commerce	James Bailey	Appointed
Wisconsin Secretary of Workforce Development	Amy Pechacek	Appointed
Wyoming Director of Workforce Services	Robin Sessions Cooley	Appointed
