= 2014 Oregon Commissioner of Labor election =

2014 Oregon Commissioner of Labor and Industries election
- May 20, 2014
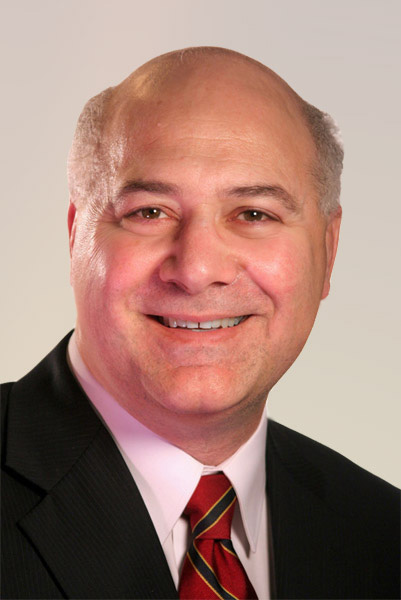
Nominee	Brad Avakian
Party	Nonpartisan
Popular vote	406,798
Percentage	98.27%
Commissioner of Labor and Industries before election
Brad Avakian
Elected Commissioner of Labor and Industries
Brad Avakian

The 2014 Oregon Commissioner of Labor and Industries election was held on May 20, 2014, in order to elect the Oregon Commissioner of Labor and Industries. The election was held on a nonpartisan basis.

Incumbent Commissioner Brad Avakian was re-elected unopposed in the May primary. Because he received over 50% of the vote, the general election scheduled for November was not held.

== Primary election ==
A nonpartisan primary election was held alongside partisan primary elections on May 20, 2014. Conservative Christian groups, unhappy over Avakian's enforcement action against a bakery that refused to bake a cake for a lesbian couple's wedding, attempted to recruit a challenger, but were unsuccessful. Avakian was unopposed in the election and essentially declared victory on the filing deadline.

=== Candidates ===
- Brad Avakian, incumbent Labor Commissioner

While the position of Labor Commissioner is nonpartisan, Avakian is a Democrat.

=== Results ===
Primary results
Party	Candidate	Votes	%
Nonpartisan	Brad Avakian	406,798	98.27%
	write-ins	7,153	1.73%
Total votes		413,951	100.00%

== See also ==
- 2014 Oregon gubernatorial election
- 2014 Oregon state elections
