= Robert Ackerman (politician) =

American politician from Oregon

Member of the Oregon House of Representatives from the 13th district
- In office January 8, 2001 – 2005
- Preceded by: Dan Gardner
- Succeeded by: Brad Avakian

Personal details
- Born: March 31, 1937 San Francisco
- Died: February 22, 2022 (aged 84)
- Party: Democratic
- Profession: Lawyer, politician

Robert "Bob" Ackerman was an American politician from the U.S. state of Oregon. A member of the Democratic Party, he served for three terms.

== Biography ==
Ackerman was born in San Francisco, California, and moved to Eugene aged 17 to pursue education. He attended the University of Oregon, receiving his undergraduate in 1958 and earning a law degree in 1963 from University of Oregon School of Law. While in school, he supported Vietnam War protests. After graduating, he formed his own law firm. He served on the board of Lane Community College for 50 years. He died in 2022 after a struggle with Parkinson's disease.
