= 2022 Oregon Ballot Measure 114 =

Ballot Measure 114
- Changes to Firearm Ownership and Purchase Requirements Initiative

Results
Choice	Votes	%
Yes	975,862	50.65%
No	950,891	49.35%
Total votes	1,926,753	100.00%
- Yes: 50–60% 60–70% 70–80% No: 50–60% 60–70% 70–80% 80–90%

Oregon Ballot Measure 114, the Reduction of Gun Violence Act, is an Oregon state initiative that was narrowly approved by voters on November 8, 2022. It changes gun laws in Oregon to require a permit to purchase or acquire a firearm, and to ban the sale, transfer, and importation of magazines that "are capable of holding" more than ten rounds of ammunition. On March 12, 2025, the Oregon Court of Appeals ruled that the law is facially constitutional under Article I, section 27 of the state constitution. The law is currently on hold due to procedural rules that give the challengers 35 days to seek further appellate review of the decision.

== Description ==
The permit (of a maximum amount of $150 as amended by SB348) must be purchased from either the county sheriff or police where the buyer resides. Permits are issued per person, not per gun, and are valid for five years. Law enforcement will have the ability to deny a permit to those they believe to be a danger to themselves or others, while those denied a permit are able to appeal in court.

The permit to purchase law is similar to the permit requirements in 14 other states and Washington D.C. To obtain a permit to purchase a firearm, the applicant would be required to take a gun safety education class, submit their fingerprints, and pass a completed FBI background check, which the FBI later clarified they could not perform.

The high-capacity magazine ban would prohibit residents from acquiring magazines that can hold more than ten rounds, as well as implementing a ban on any magazine "that can be readily restored, changed, or converted to accept, more than 10 rounds of ammunition". Existing magazines that can hold more than ten rounds would be grandfathered in, but could only be used on private property, i.e. not for concealed or open carry in public. Nine other states plus D.C. ban or restrict high-capacity magazines.

== Implementation, enforcement, and effects ==
Sheriffs in Klamath County, Linn County, Sherman County, and Union County indicated they would not enforce some or all of the new laws, especially the magazine bans as they believed the ban was unconstitutional, but also would be extremely difficult to enforce and gun rights organizations prepared to challenge the constitutionality of the laws in court.

The passage of Measure 114 saw a surge in gun sales. The Oregon State Police reported that prior the vote on 114, their Firearms Instant Check System (FICS) averaged 849 background checks a day in 2022. After 114's approval, the average number of background checks per day increased to 4,092.

On December 6, 2022, Harney County Circuit Judge Robert S. Raschio issued a temporary restraining order against all provisions of the law (which the Oregon Supreme Court denied the attorney general's petition to overturn), a decision that came just hours after that of Federal Judge Karin Immergut allowing it to take effect, save for the permit requirement which was delayed for 30 days at the request of the state.

On July 14, 2023, a federal judge upheld Measure 114 under the United States Constitution saying that "banning large capacity magazines and requiring a permit to purchase a gun falls in line with “the nation’s history and tradition of regulating uniquely dangerous features of weapons and firearms to protect public safety." However, on November 21, 2023, Judge Robert Raschio of the Oregon Circuit Court granted a permanent injunction based on a finding that the law was facially unconstitutional under Oregon's state constitution. On April 12, 2024, the Oregon Court of Appeals denied a motion seeking to allow the law to go into effect while the state appealed the earlier injunction.

On January 13, 2025 House Bill 3075 was introduced to amend Measure 114 and adds additional restrictions and requirements, but also relaxes a few restrictions as well. Some of the proposed amendments include changing the agency that issues firearm permits, Measure 114 stated that permits would be issued by the Oregon State Police, whereas HB3075 makes provisions for permits to also be issued by county sheriff's offices and city police departments. HB3075 would remove one of the most controversial parts of Measure 114, which makes the information obtained during the application and background check process within the state's database for firearm permit holders public record, 3075 would make that information exempt from public record. It also extends the time required for law enforcement to issue a permit to qualified applicants from 30 days to 60 days, and if a person is denied requires them to provide a written explanation of the reasons for denial, and establishes a process for appealing denials to the court. HB3075 also would increase the permit fees from $65 to $150 for a new application and the renewal fee from $50 to $110, and allows law enforcement to charge up to an additional $48 for background checks. It also establishes alternatives to a firearms training course that allows most of the course to be taken online, but still requires an in-person demonstration of basic firearms and safety competency skills, including a live fire demonstration. One of the most controversial changes in HB3075 is the amendments to the affirmative defense clause for grandfathered large capacity magazines, and puts the burden of proof on the magazine owner while adding requirements that would be next to impossible to prove, including the magazine being in the owner's possession the entire time. Specifically it amends ORS 166.355 to state that it is an affirmative defense to unlawful possession of a large capacity magazine ONLY if it can be proved the magazine was lawfully owned prior to the ban taking effect, and ONLY if the magazine was in that person's exclusive control the entire time. It would also add a 180-day grace period from prosecution for manufacturers and retailers of high capacity magazines. It also adds stipulations that grandfathered large capacity magazines legally owned prior to the ban can only be used on private property, at private and publicly owned shooting ranges, and for recreational uses like hunting & competition shooting. When a large capacity magazine is being transported to one of these locations it cannot be inserted into the firearm, and must either be unloaded or locked in a separate container than the firearm. This would mean if a loaded rifle is being kept in a person's vehicle for self defense purposes, or if a person is open carrying a handgun, or conceal carrying for those with a carry permit, those firearms would have to be loaded with a 10-round (or smaller) magazine. The bill also proposes making certain types of guns exempt from requiring a purchase permit, so long as the purchaser has completed a required gun safety course; a firearm would exempt from requiring a permit if: it is a single-shot rifle, single-shot shotgun, double-barreled shotgun, pump action shotgun, bolt action rifle, lever action rifle, pump action rifle, a rifle with a tubular magazine that is only capable of firing .22 caliber rimfire ammunition, or a muzzleloading rifle. In other words a permit would only be required to purchase a semi-automatic rifle, semi-automatic shotgun or handgun. House Bill 3075 is set to be vote on in April of 2025, in March of 2025 Oregon voters submitted testimonials with gun control advocates praising it as a positive step in controlling gun violence, and reducing suicides committed with guns. It also received sharp criticism as well, critics said that House Bill 3075 changes Measure 114 into an entirely different bill than the one voters barely passed, with raising the prices of permits and background checks as just an attempt to circumvent the Second Amendment by making the process of purchasing a gun too expensive for many people. Critics also question the need for stricter gun control in Oregon, as the state has one of the highest gun ownership and conceal carry permit holder rates in the nation, while also historically having one of the lowest violent crime and murder rates in the nation.

On March 12, 2025, the Oregon Court of Appeals ruled Measure 114 is constitutional in full. Procedural rules give the challengers 35 days to seek further appellate review of the decision.

== Polling ==
The following polls measured support or opposition among likely voters before the November elections.

Poll source	Date(s) administered	Sample size (Note: Key: A – all adults RV – registered voters LV – likely voters V – unclear)	Margin of error	For Measure 114	Against Measure 114	Undecided
Nelson Research	October 31 – November 1, 2022	577 (LV)	± 4%	46%	49%	5%
DHM Research	September 23–24, 2022	600 (LV)	± 4%	51%	39%	10%

== See also ==
- Gun laws in Oregon
- List of Oregon ballot measures
