= Charlie Ringo =

American politician from Oregon

Member of the Oregon Senate from the 17th district
- In office January 13, 2003 – January 8, 2007
- Preceded by: Peter Courtney
- Succeeded by: Brad Avakian

Member of the Oregon House of Representatives from the 6th district
- In office January 8, 2001 – January 13, 2003
- Preceded by: Ken Strobeck
- Succeeded by: Brad Avakian

Personal details
- Born: Charles Arch Ringo; June 14, 1958 (age 68) Corvallis, Oregon, United States
- Party: Democratic
- Education: United States Air Force Academy; Boston University; Lewis & Clark Law School

Charles Arch Ringo (born June 14, 1958) is an American lawyer and politician from the state of Oregon. He served in both houses of the Oregon Legislative Assembly between 2001 and 2007.

== Biography ==
Ringo was born and raised in Corvallis, Oregon. He graduated with a Bachelor of Science in international affairs and economics from the United States Air Force Academy in 1980 and served in the Air Force from 1980 until 1985. In 1985, Ringo graduated with a Master of Business Administration from Boston University, and with a Juris Doctor from Lewis & Clark Law School in 1989.

Ringo was elected to the Oregon House of Representatives in 2000, defeating Republican John Scruggs and Libertarian Kevin C. Schaumleffle with 51% of the vote. He was elected to the Oregon Senate in 2002, defeating Republican Bill Witt with 55% of the vote. Ringo declined to run for reelection in 2006.

== Personal life ==
Ringo and his wife, Julie, have two children: Reese and Joseph. He is a member of the Episcopal Church.
