= Oregon's 54th House district =

Legislative districts in the state of Oregon

Oregon's 54th House district after redistricting after the 2020 Census

District 54 of the Oregon House of Representatives is one of 60 House legislative districts in the state of Oregon. As of 2021, the district is located entirely within Deschutes County and includes the majority of the city of Bend as well as the campus of Oregon State University–Cascades. The current representative for the district is Democrat Jason Kropf of Bend.

== Election results ==
District boundaries have changed over time. Therefore, representatives before 2021 may not represent the same constituency as today. General election results from 2000 to present are as follows:

Year	Candidate	Party	Percent	Opponent	Party	Percent	Opponent	Party	Percent	Write-ins
2000	Tim Knopp	Republican	61.39%	Ken Cooper	Democratic	38.61%	No third candidate			
2002	Tim Knopp	Republican	61.57%	Les Lambert	Democratic	38.12%	No third candidate			0.31%
2004	Chuck Burley	Republican	50.83%	Judy Stiegler	Democratic	49.17%	No third candidate			
2006	Chuck Burley	Republican	55.35%	Phil Philiben	Democratic	44.39%	No third candidate			0.25%
2008	Judy Stiegler	Democratic	53.46%	Chuck Burley	Republican	46.21%	No third candidate			0.32%
2010	Jason Conger	Republican	52.50%	Judy Stiegler	Democratic	40.84%	Mike Kozak	(Note: Mike Kozak ran with no party affiliation in this election.)	6.66%	
2012	Jason Conger	Republican	56.36%	Nathan Hovekamp	Democratic	43.42%	No third candidate			0.23%
2014	Knute Buehler	Republican	58.23%	Craig Wilhelm	Democratic	41.26%	No third candidate			0.51%
2016	Knute Buehler	Republican	51.92%	Gena Goodman-Campbell	Democratic	47.77%	No third candidate			0.31%
2018	Cheri Helt	Republican	58.12%	Nathan Boddie	Democratic	24.75%	Amanda La Bell	Working Families	15.29%	1.84%
2020	Jason Kropf	Democratic	60.04%	Cheri Helt	Republican	38.93%	No third candidate			1.03%
2022	Jason Kropf	Democratic	64.42%	Judy Trego	Republican	35.51%	No third candidate			0.08%
2024	Jason Kropf	Democratic	96.5%	Unopposed						3.5%

== See also ==
- Oregon Legislative Assembly
- Oregon House of Representatives
