= Cheri Helt =

American politician

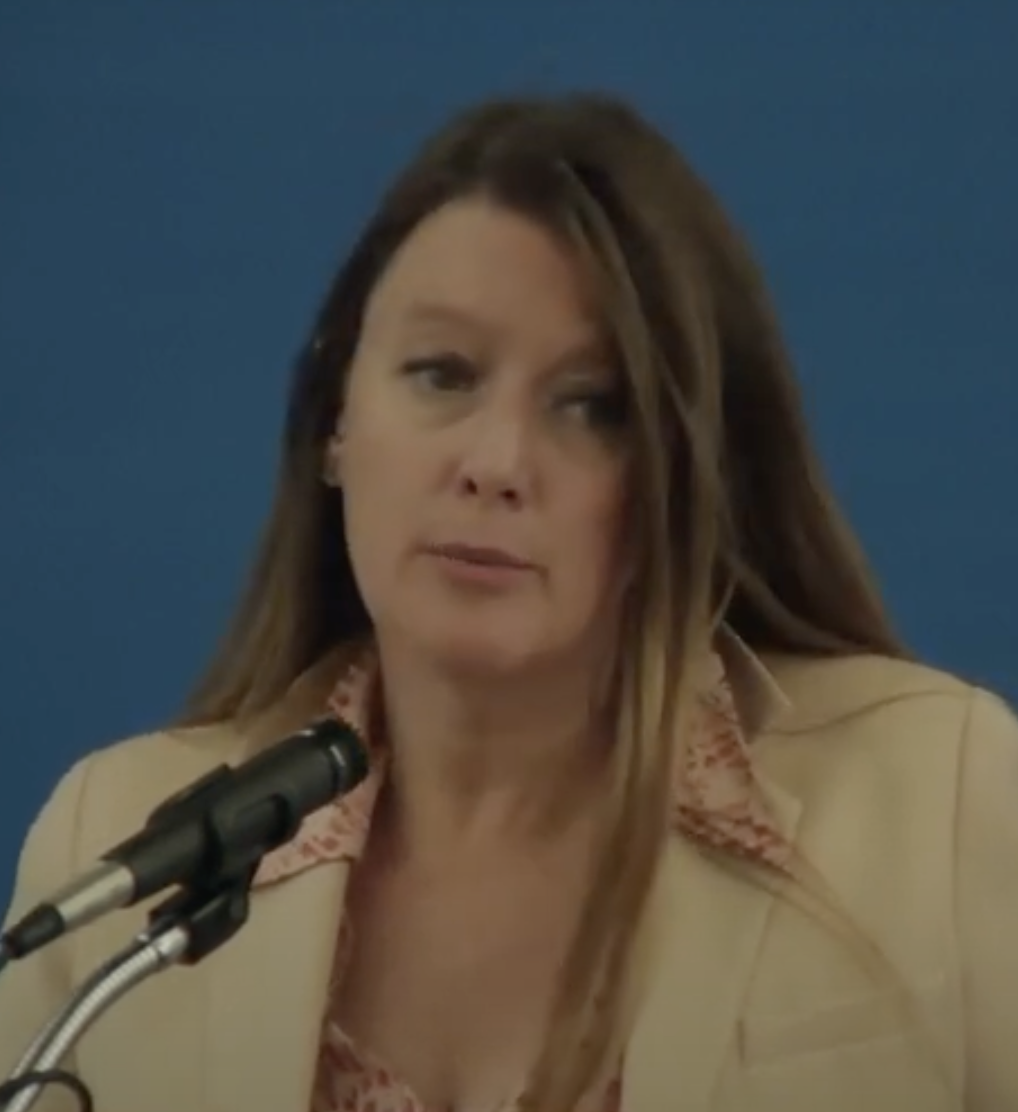

Member of the Oregon House of Representatives from the 54th district
- In office January 15, 2019 – January 11, 2021
- Preceded by: Knute Buehler
- Succeeded by: Jason Kropf

Personal details
- Born: 1970 or 1971 (age 55–56)
- Party: Republican
- Education: Michigan State University (BS)

Cheri Helt (born 1970/1971) is a restaurateur, an American politician and former Republican member of the Oregon House of Representatives who was elected on November 6, 2018, to replace Republican Knute Buehler who left his legislative seat to run unsuccessfully for governor. She disagreed with fellow Republicans on issues such as mandatory vaccinations for school enrollment. Helt represented the 54th district which includes most of Bend. She previously served on the Bend-La Pine School Board from 2010 to 2019.

Helt was defeated for reelection in 2020 by Democrat Jason Kropf. She ran for the nonpartisan office of state Commissioner of Labor and Industries in 2022. She advanced from the primary to a runoff election against Christina Stephenson. Stephenson defeated Helt in the November 8 general election.

== Electoral history ==
2018 Oregon State Representative, 54th district
Party	Candidate	Votes	%
Republican	Cheri Helt	21,134	58.1
Democratic	Nathan K Boddie	9,000	24.7
Working Families	Amanda La Bell	5,560	15.3
Write-in		670	1.8
Total votes		36,364	100%

2020 Oregon State Representative, 54th district
Party	Candidate	Votes	%
Democratic	Jason Kropf	27,999	60.0
Republican	Cheri Helt	18,153	38.9
Write-in		480	1.0
Total votes		46,632	100%

2022 Oregon Commissioner of Labor election
Party	Candidate	Votes	%
Nonpartisan	Christina Stephenson	916,455	60.7
Nonpartisan	Cheri Helt	582,609	38.6
Write-in		9,826	0.7
Total votes		1,508,890	100%
