= Oregon Bureau of Labor and Industries =

Department of the state government of Oregon, U.S.

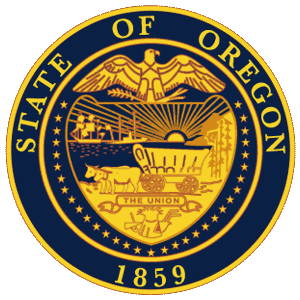
- Great Seal of the State of Oregon

Commissioner
- Branch: Executive
- Type: Nonpartisan
- Selection: Statewide election
- Term: 4 years
- Authority: Statute
- Established: 1918

Incumbent
- Name: Christina Stephenson
- Term ends: 2027

The Oregon Bureau of Labor and Industries (BOLI) is an agency in the executive branch of the government of the U.S. state of Oregon. It is headed by the Commissioner of Labor and Industries, a nonpartisan, statewide elective office. The term of office is four years. The current commissioner is Christina Stephenson replacing Val Hoyle who was elected to Oregon's 4th congressional district in 2022.

== History ==
In 1903, the Oregon Legislative Assembly created the Bureau of Labor Statistics and Inspector of Factories and Workshops in response to public concerns about the effects industrialization on society. Its head, titled Commissioner, was initially appointed by the Governor. O. P. Hoff, the initial appointee, was elected in 1906, and reelected in 1910 and 1914.

Dan Gardner of Milwaukie was Commissioner from 2003–2008. He resigned in March 2008 to take a job with the International Brotherhood of Electrical Workers in Washington, D.C. He is the first Commissioner of BOLI to leave mid-term for another job. His replacement was Brad Avakian, who was re-elected to the position in 2008.

Val Hoyle was elected as the new BOLI Commissioner in 2018, after Avakian decided that he would not seek re-election.

== Commissioner duties and responsibilities ==
The Commissioner serves as chief executive of the department-level Oregon Bureau of Labor and Industries, chairs the State Apprenticeship and Training Council, and acts as executive secretary of the Wage and Hour Commission.

The Commissioner has enforcement responsibility for state laws prohibiting discrimination in employment, housing, public accommodation, and vocational, professional and trade schools, and may initiate a “commissioner’s complaint” on behalf of victims.

The Commissioner administers state laws regulating wages, hours of employment, basic working conditions, child labor and wage rates; and is responsible for licensure of certain professions and industries. Final orders in contested cases are issued by the commissioner.

The Wage Security Fund that covers workers for unpaid wages in certain business closure situations, and enforcement of group-health insurance termination-notification provisions fall within the Commissioner's purview. The Commissioner is also responsible for oversight of the state’s registered apprenticeship-training system.

== See also ==
- PGE v. Bureau of Labor and Industries
