= Jason Conger =

American politician (born 1968)

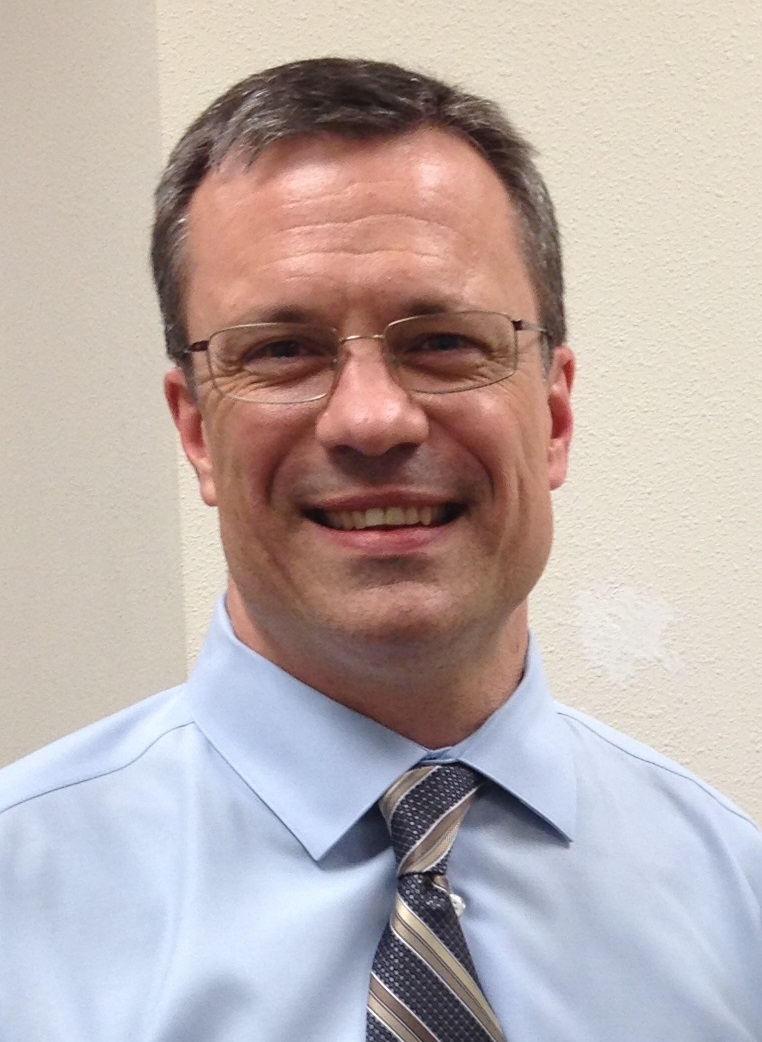

Member of the Oregon House of Representatives from the 54th district
- In office January 10, 2011 – January 12, 2015
- Preceded by: Judy Stiegler
- Succeeded by: Knute Buehler

Personal details
- Born: March 27, 1968 (age 58)
- Party: Republican
- Spouse: Amy Conger
- Education: Humboldt State University; Harvard University
- Website: Official website

Jason R. R. Conger (/ˈkɑːŋɡər/ KONG-gər; born March 27, 1968) is an American attorney and Republican politician from the U.S. state of Oregon. He served in the Oregon House of Representatives representing District 54 in Bend, Oregon, from 2011 to 2015. He ran for the Republican nomination for United States Senate in 2014.

== Early life and career ==
Conger was born in California on March 27, 1968. His parents were describes as heavily involved in the "drug and hippie scene of Haight-Ashbury in San Francisco. As a child, he moved around the western states with his parents. His parents separated when he was eight years old. He went with his father, who lived an itinerant life. Conger left his father when he was 16 and began living on his own in Crescent City, California.

Eventually, Conger earned his high school diploma at Sunset High (continuation) while working at a succession of menial jobs. He ran for the Crescent City Council after four of the five council members were recalled, but was not elected. After losing the city council election, he went to work for Frank Riggs, who was running for a seat in the United States House of Representatives, representing a district in northwest California. Riggs was elected to Congress in 1990, and Conger was given a staff job in Riggs’ office in Washington, District of Columbia. Conger later returned to the northern California, where he worked in Riggs’ district office.

Conger then attended Humboldt State University, where he earned an undergraduate degree in 1997. After graduation, he applied for admission to Harvard Law School and was accepted. He was awarded a J.D. degree from Harvard in 2000. He then went to work for a large international law firm in San Diego, California. By the early 2000s, Conger had built a successful corporate law practice. He specialized in corporate mergers, stock and bond offerings, and high-tech start-ups. In 2004, he persuaded his firm to let him move his practice to Bend, Oregon. In 2009, Conger became a partner in Miller Nash, a Portland-based law firm. However, his law office remained in Bend.

== Political career ==
Conger was first elected to the Oregon House of Representatives in 2010, defeating incumbent Judy Stiegler. He was re-elected in 2012, serving as Assistant Republican Leader in the party leadership.

Conger's term in Oregon legislature was highlighted with several measures. He gathered Republican support for an early version of Senate Bill 478, which would establish and maintain list of dangerous chemicals used in children's medicine. He successfully led the effort to establish the Oregon State University Cascades Campus in Bend. Conger also spearheaded the drive to reform the Oregon state employees’ pension fund and defended the state’s charitable tax deduction.

=== U.S. Senate campaign ===
In October 2013, Conger announced his decision to run for the Republican nomination for the United States Senate seat held by Jeff Merkley. Conger lost to Portland neurosurgeon Monica Wehby in the Republican primary.

== Personal ==
Conger met his wife, Amy, when he was 17 and living in Crescent City. They were married four years later. The Congers live in Bend with their five children. The Congers selected Bend as their home because they wanted a small-town environment to raise their children, who were home-schooled much of the time.

== Electoral history ==
2010 Oregon State Representative, 54th district
Party	Candidate	Votes	%
Republican	Jason Conger	16,391	52.4
Democratic	Judy Stiegler	12,771	40.8
Independent	Mike Kozak	2,074	6.6
Write-in		32	0.1
Total votes		31,268	100%

2012 Oregon State Representative, 54th district
Party	Candidate	Votes	%
Republican	Jason Conger	16,716	56.4
Democratic	Nathan R Hovekamp	12,877	43.4
Write-in		67	0.2
Total votes		29,660	100%
