= Gun laws in Oregon =

Location of Oregon in the United States

Gun laws in Oregon regulate the manufacture, sale, possession, and use of firearms and ammunition in the state of Oregon in the United States.

In the November 8, 2022 general election, voters approved Oregon Ballot Measure 114, with about 50.6% voting in favor and 49.4% opposed. The measure creates a new permit that would be required to purchase or acquire a firearm. County sheriffs would accept permit applications, and the state police would conduct background checks, which would be stricter than the current checks. Applicants would need to complete an approved training course, submit fingerprints, and pay a $65 fee. Additionally, the ballot measure bans the sale, transfer, or importation of magazines that can hold more than ten rounds of ammunition. There have been a number of legal challenges to these provisions, and several judicial rulings have blocked the implementation of Ballot Measure 114 for now.

== Summary table ==
Subject / law	Long guns	Handguns	Relevant statutes	Notes
State permit required to purchase?	No	No	Oregon Ballot Measure 114	Ballot Measure 114 instituted a requirement for a permit to purchase. Due to litigation the revised law is not currently in effect.
Firearm registration?	No	No	ORS 166.412(7)(a)	The Oregon State Police maintain a record of firearms sales from FFL holders for a period of 5 years, after which the records are destroyed.
Owner license required?	No	No		
Minimum age to purchase firearms.	18	21	ORS 166.470	Oregon law prohibits any person from intentionally selling, delivering, or otherwise transferring any firearm to anyone under 18 years of age (ORS 166.470(1)(a)), except: A parent or guardian, or another person with the consent of the parent or guardian, may transfer a firearm other than a handgun to a minor. (ORS 166.470(3)(a)); The temporary transfer of any firearm to a minor for hunting, target practice, or any other lawful purpose. (ORS 166.470(3)(b))
Minors allowed to possess firearms?	Yes, with exceptions	Yes, with exceptions	ORS 166.250	Minors may: ...possess a firearm other than a handgun if the firearm was transferred to the minor by the minor’s parent or guardian or by another person with the consent of the minor’s parent. ORS 166.250(2)(a)(A); ...not possess a firearm if they are under 18 years of age, and while a minor, committed the equivalent of an adult felony or a misdemeanor involving violence, within four years of being charged with possession. ORS 166.250(1)(c); ...may also possess any firearm temporarily for hunting, target practice, or any other lawful purpose. ORS 166.250(2)(a)(B) ( and ORS 166.470(3)(b); see above)
Assault weapon ban?	No	No	---	No Oregon state laws define or regulate assault weapons. Some local counties have adopted Second Amendment sanctuary resolutions regardless.
License required for concealed carry?	Yes	Yes	ORS 166.291	Oregon is a "shall-issue" state for residents. Technically sheriffs "may issue" licenses to non-residents of contiguous states; however, in practice most county sheriffs either adopt very restrictive criteria for issuance to non-residents or simply refuse to issue licenses. Carrying of a concealed firearm is prohibited by ORS 166.250, however holders of a valid Concealed Handgun License are exempt from this law. (see ORS 166.260). As of 2021, campus carry is left up each university to decide. Prior to that, a 2011 Oregon Court of Appeals ruling stated that public universities did not have the authority to prohibit firearms on their grounds, but could still prohibit them inside buildings.
License required for open carry?	No	No	Or. Const. Art. I § 27 ORS 166.250(3)	Open carry of firearms is legal statewide without a permit. However, Oregon law allows a city or county to regulate open carry of loaded firearms in public places, but holders of concealed carry permits are exempt. (ORS 166.173) The cities of Portland, Beaverton, Tigard, Oregon City, Salem, and Independence, as well as Multnomah County, have statutes which do not allow open carry of loaded firearms (unless one has a concealed carry permit).
State preemption of local restrictions?	Yes	Yes	Or. Const. Art. I § 27 ORS 166.170	The authority to regulate the sale, acquisition, transfer, ownership, possession, storage, transportation, or use of firearms or any element relating to firearms and firearm components, including ammunition, is vested solely in the State Legislative Assembly.
NFA weapons restricted?	No	No	ORS 166.272	Possession of NFA restricted firearms and non-firearm items is legal, but owners must comply with the NFA regulations. (ORS 166.272(3))
Peaceable journey laws?	Yes	Yes	---	The State of Oregon recognizes federal law, Title 18 U.S. Code § 926A
Background checks required for private sales?	Yes	Yes	ORS 166.435	Private party firearm transfers must be conducted through a licensed firearm dealer while both parties are present. The dealer is required by federal law to conduct a background check and keep a record of the sale. Transfers between family members (spouse, parent/stepparent, child/stepchild, sibling, grandparent, grandchild, aunt/uncle, first cousin, niece/nephew, spouse of any of the above) are exempt.
Red flag law?	Yes	Yes	Or. Law Chp. 737 (2017)	If a person appears to be in imminent danger of hurting themselves or another person, a police officer or a member of the person's family or household may petition the court for a one-year order that would prohibit the person from possessing a deadly weapon.
High-capacity magazine ban	No	No	Oregon Ballot Measure 114	Ballot Measure 114 bans the sale, transfer, or importation of magazines that can hold more than ten rounds of ammunition. Possession of such magazines remains legal, with some restrictions. Due to litigation the new law is not currently in effect.

== Concealed and open carry ==
Oregon is a shall-issue concealed-carry state. and is notable for having very few restrictions on where a concealed firearm may be carried. Oregon also has statewide preemption for its concealed-carry laws—with limited exceptions, counties and cities cannot place limits on the ability of people to carry concealed weapons beyond those provided by state law.

There is one possible exception to the "shall issue" state. The concealed-carry license is issued by each county's sheriff, and is valid statewide. The sheriff is given personal discretion if that sheriff "has reasonable grounds to believe that the applicant has been or is reasonably likely to be a danger to self or others." There is no pure definition of what that reason must be. For instance it might be a statement from another law enforcement officer about an individual, and that statement might come from personal acquaintance. The burden, and perhaps the right to recover damages would then be on the applicant.

There is no reciprocity with other states' concealed handgun licenses. Individuals wanting to carry a concealed handgun in Oregon will need an Oregon Concealed Handgun License. Though both residents and non-residents are allowed to open carry a handgun in Oregon without a permit.

Oregon is also an open-carry state with no permit being required to carry openly, but cities and counties are free to limit public possession of loaded firearms by individuals who do not have an Oregon Concealed Handgun License, those who do are exempt and allowed to open carry in these places. The cities of Portland, Beaverton, Tigard, Oregon City, Salem, and Independence, as well as Multnomah County have banned loaded firearms in all public places for those without a license.

== Other laws ==
In Oregon, the right to bear arms is protected by Article 1, Section 27 of the Oregon Constitution.

In Oregon, firearm owners can be held liable in civil court if a firearms injury is caused by negligence, and can be held responsible for damages in a wrongful death claim if the firearm is used to kill someone.

If a person appears to be a risk to themselves or to others, a police officer or the person's family or household member may petition the court for a one-year extreme risk protection order that would prohibit the person from possessing a deadly weapon. If a judge finds clear and convincing evidence that the person is in imminent danger of hurting themselves or another person, the respondent would have 24 hours to surrender all deadly weapons.

It is illegal for someone to possess a firearm if they are under 18 years of age, were convicted of a felony, were convicted by a juvenile court of a crime which, if committed by an adult, would constitute a felony or a violent misdemeanor, were found to be mentally ill and were committed by the Department of Human Services, or are subject to an order from the Department of Human Services prohibiting them from possessing a firearm for mental health reasons. Unlawful possession of a firearm is a Class A misdemeanor.

== Hunting regulations ==
Oregon Department of Fish and Wildlife implements specific regulations for which type of firearms are legal to use within the hunting season for a particular game species.

Subject/Law	Long guns	Handguns	Relevant statutes	Notes
Black Bear & Cougar	.22 cal or larger centerfire	.22 cal or larger centerfire		
Pronghorn	.22 cal or larger centerfire	.22 cal or larger centerfire		
Buck Deer	.22 cal or larger centerfire	.22 cal or larger centerfire		
Elk	.24 cal or larger centerfire	.24 cal or larger centerfire		
Bighorn Sheep & Rocky Mountain Goat	.24 cal or larger centerfire	.24 cal or larger centerfire		
Western Gray Squirrel	Any	Any		
