= Judy Stiegler =

American politician

Member of the Oregon House of Representatives from the 54th district
- In office January 12, 2009 – January 10, 2011
- Preceded by: Chuck Burley
- Succeeded by: Jason Conger

Personal details
- Born: July 4, 1953 (age 73) Montrose, Colorado, U.S.
- Party: Democratic
- Spouse: Mike Dugan
- Children: 2
- Education: University of Oregon

Judy Stiegler (born July 4, 1953) is an American Democratic politician who served in the Oregon House of Representatives from 2009 until 2011.

== Biography ==
Stiegler was born in Montrose, Colorado in 1953. She graduated from the University of Oregon with a Bachelor of Science in 1975, and from Lewis and Clark College with a Juris Doctor in 1978. Stiegler served on the board of the Bend-La Pine School District from 1989 until 1992, and became President of the National Association of State Boards of Education in 2000. She defeated incumbent Republican State Representative Chuck Burley in 2008. Stiegler ran for reelection in 2010 but was defeated by Republican Jason Conger.

== Personal life ==
Stiegler is married to Mike Dugan, and they have two children, Daniel and Molly. They attend First Presbyterian Church in Bend.

== Electoral history ==
2004 Oregon State Representative, 54th district
| Party | Candidate | Votes | % |
|---|---|---|---|
| Republican | Chuck Burley | 16,804 | 48.8 |
| Democratic | Judy Stiegler | 16,256 | 47.2 |
| Libertarian | Tristan Reisfar | 1,312 | 3.8 |
| Write-in | | 65 | 0.2 |
| Total votes | | 34,437 | 100% |

2008 Oregon State Representative, 54th district
| Party | Candidate | Votes | % |
|---|---|---|---|
| Democratic | Judy Stiegler | 19,779 | 53.5 |
| Republican | Chuck Burley | 17,096 | 46.2 |
| Write-in | | 120 | 0.3 |
| Total votes | | 36,995 | 100% |

2010 Oregon State Representative, 54th district
| Party | Candidate | Votes | % |
|---|---|---|---|
| Republican | Jason Conger | 16,391 | 52.4 |
| Democratic | Judy Stiegler | 12,771 | 40.8 |
| Independent | Mike Kozak | 2,074 | 6.6 |
| Write-in | | 32 | 0.1 |
| Total votes | | 31,268 | 100% |
