= PGE v. Bureau of Labor and Industries =

1993 Legal case in the Oregon Supreme Court

Portland General Electric Co. v. Bureau of Labor and Industries, 859 P.2d 1143 (Or. 1993) was a case in which the Oregon Supreme Court established a binding methodological regime for conducting statutory interpretation. The case was unique in its application of stare decisis principles to interpretive methodology, mandating a specific interpretive approach to statutes in a way that the federal courts have not. The judicial "experiment" enjoyed sixteen years of consistent application before a case in 2009 undermined the interpretive framework.

== Background ==
The case was brought by Portland General Electric Co. (PGE) to review an order of the Bureau of Labor and Industries (BOLI) that had determined PGE had engaged in an unlawful employment practice. Specifically, the issue was PGE had denied a request by an employee to use paid sick leave during parental leave. The legal issue for the courts revolved around the rules of statutory interpretation.

A frequent criticism of statutory interpretation, particularly at the federal level, is the wide range of discretion left to judges to apply varying interpretive rules, in varying ways, in order to construe statutes. Notable interpretive theories are textualism, intentionalism, and purposivism. Even within such theories, individual judges may differ as to the order and weight they give to particular rules of construction. Professor Abbe Gluck writes that states have led the way in attempting to bring more consistency to statutory interpretation, most notably the Oregon Supreme Court in the PGE case and its progeny.

== The PGE Framework ==
The case, which concerned whether an Oregon statute allowed an employee to receive paid parental sick leave even when they had not met certain conditions agreed to in collective bargaining, established a hierarchical, three-tier framework of statutory interpretation.

=== Step 1 ===
Under PGE, Oregon courts had to first look to the text of the statute, including relevant context such as similar statutes and other provisions within the same statute. If the text and context made the intent of the legislature clear with respect to the statutory provision, the inquiry ended. Only if legislative intent remained ambiguous after this first step could the court move on to the second step.

=== Step 2 ===
Next, the court would look at legislative history for clues as to the statute's meaning. Again, if this step made the meaning clear, the court's analysis would end; if not, it would continue to step three.

=== Step 3 ===
Finally, if the first two levels left the question unresolved, the court would use "general maxims of statutory construction" to reach a conclusion.

== Aftermath of PGE ==
Oregon courts uniformly followed the PGE framework as binding precedent for sixteen years, from 1993 to 2009, with no member of the Oregon Supreme Court second-guessing the methodological mandate during that time. This consistent application of the methodology occurred despite the legislature's enactment of a 2001 statute that may have ambiguously sought to limit it. The PGE framework had several observable impacts on the way Oregon courts resolved statutory questions. It greatly cut down on consideration of legislative history, with the Supreme Court reaching the second step of the framework only 9 times out of 150 cases that cited PGE between 1999 and 2006. In that time, it reached the third step just once. Because post-PGE cases so rarely went beyond the textual/contextual first step, especially when compared to pre-PGE trends, Professor Gluck termed the framework "modified textualism." Additionally, the framework may have contributed to more consistent and predictable interpretive conclusions, with the Supreme Court resolving 53 of 59 statutory cases unanimously between 2005 and 2009.

The methodological consensus appeared to end in 2009, when State v. Gaines, 206 P.3d 1042 (Or. 2009) suggested that the court could consider legislative history with or without ambiguity at Step 1, even as it professed continued adherence to PGE.
