= Jason Kropf =

American politician

Member of the Oregon House of Representatives from the 54th district
- Incumbent
- Assumed office January 11, 2021
- Preceded by: Cheri Helt

Personal details
- Party: Democratic
- Education: Oregon State University (BA); University of Oregon (JD)

Jason Kropf is an American politician and attorney serving as a member of the Oregon House of Representatives from the 54th district. Elected in 2020, he assumed office in January 2021.

== Early life and education ==
Kropf is a fifth-generation resident of Oregon. Raised in Southern Oregon, he earned a Bachelor of Arts degree in philosophy from Oregon State University and a Juris Doctor from the University of Oregon School of Law.

== Career ==
Prior to entering politics, Kropf worked as a public defender and deputy district attorney in Deschutes County, Oregon. Elected in the 2020 general election, Kropf defeated incumbent Republican Cheri Helt. He assumed office in January 2021.

== Personal life ==
Kropf lives in Bend, Oregon, with his wife and daughter.

== Electoral history ==
2020 Oregon State Representative, 54th district
Party	Candidate	Votes	%
Democratic	Jason Kropf	27,999	60.0
Republican	Cheri Helt	18,153	38.9
Write-in		480	1.0
Total votes		46,632	100%

2022 Oregon State Representative, 54th district
Party	Candidate	Votes	%
Democratic	Jason Kropf	22,865	64.4
Republican	Judy Trego	12,604	35.5
Write-in		27	0.1
Total votes		35,496	100%

2024 Oregon State Representative, 54th district
Party	Candidate	Votes	%
Democratic	Jason Kropf	28,395	96.5
Write-in		1,040	3.5
Total votes		29,435	100%
