= Chuck Burley =

American Republican politician

Member of the Oregon House of Representatives from the 54th district
- In office January 2005 – January 12, 2009
- Preceded by: Tim Knopp
- Succeeded by: Judy Stiegler

Personal details
- Born: January 10, 1956 (age 70) Cleveland, Ohio, U.S.
- Party: Republican
- Spouse: Linda
- Children: 2
- Occupation: Colorado State University

Chuck Burley (born January 10, 1956) is an American Republican politician who served in the Oregon House of Representatives from 2005 until 2009.

== Career ==
Burley moved to Bend, Oregon in 1993, and served as a U.S. Forest Service official. He was elected to the 73rd Oregon Legislative Assembly in 2004, and served until 2009, when he was defeated by Democrat Judy Stiegler.

== Electoral history ==
2004 Oregon State Representative, 54th district
Party	Candidate	Votes	%
Republican	Chuck Burley	16,804	48.8
Democratic	Judy Stiegler	16,256	47.2
Libertarian	Tristan Reisfar	1,312	3.8
Write-in		65	0.2
Total votes		34,437	100%

2006 Oregon State Representative, 54th district
Party	Candidate	Votes	%
Republican	Chuck Burley	14,780	55.3
Democratic	Phil Philiben	11,873	44.4
Write-in		67	0.3
Total votes		26,720	100%

2008 Oregon State Representative, 54th district
Party	Candidate	Votes	%
Democratic	Judy Stiegler	19,779	53.5
Republican	Chuck Burley	17,096	46.2
Write-in		120	0.3
Total votes		36,995	100%
