= Christina Stephenson =

American politician

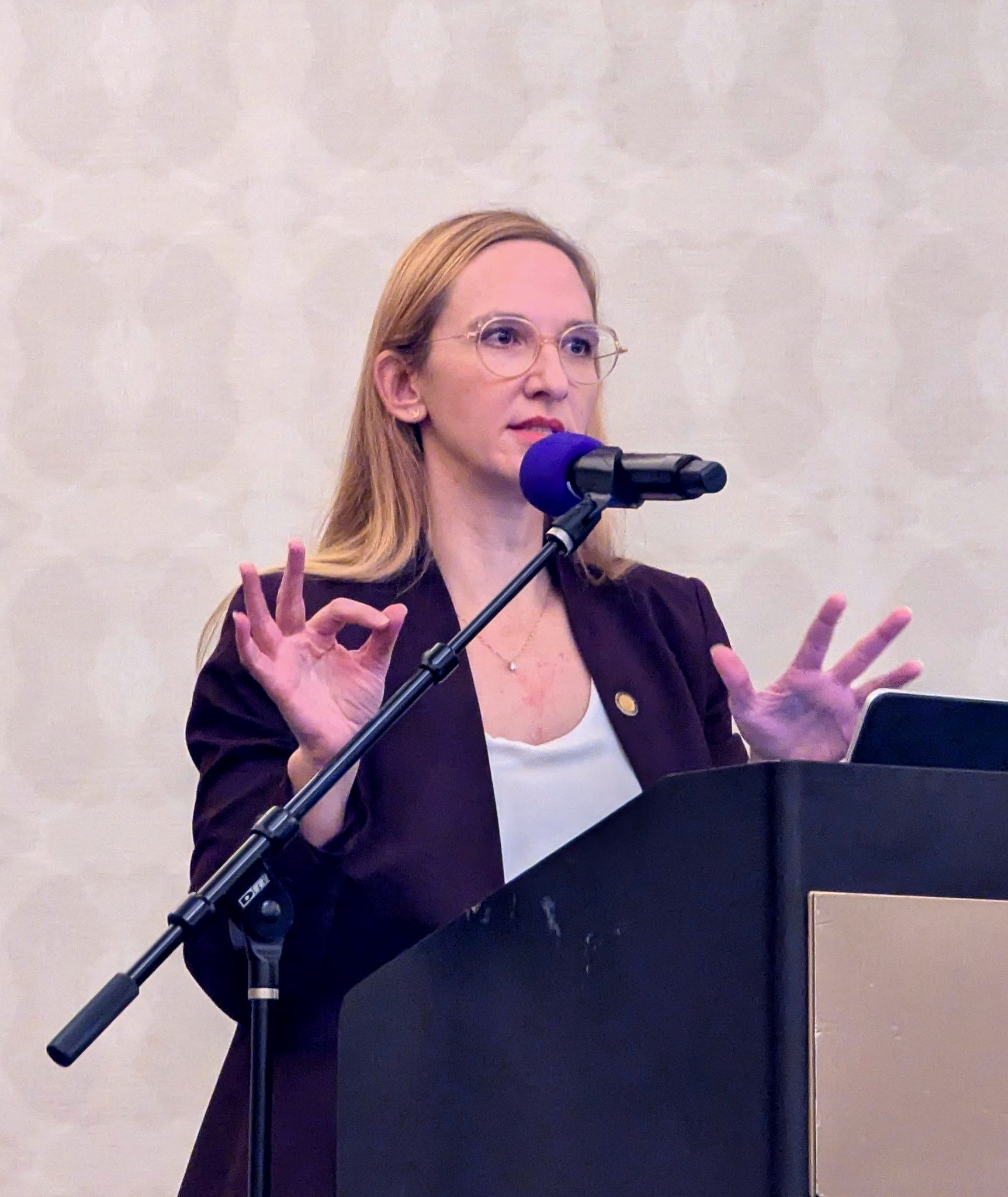
- Stephenson in 2025

Labor Commissioner of Oregon
- Incumbent
- Assumed office January 2, 2023
- Governor: Kate Brown; Tina Kotek
- Preceded by: Val Hoyle

Personal details
- Born: Washington County, Oregon, U.S.
- Party: Democratic
- Spouse: Eric Wasik
- Children: 1
- Education: American University (BA); University of Oregon (JD)

Christina Erin Stephenson is an American attorney and politician serving as the Oregon Commissioner of the Bureau of Labor and Industries (BOLI) since 2023. A civil rights and employment lawyer by profession, she has focused her legal career on workplace discrimination, employment law, and civil rights litigation. Before her election as Labor Commissioner, she practiced law in Portland, Oregon, representing employees and employers in workplace disputes and civil rights matters. She was elected Oregon Labor Commissioner in 2022 after defeating former state representative Cheri Helt in the nonpartisan general election. She was re-elected in 2026.

== Early life and education ==
Stephenson was born and raised in rural Washington County, Oregon, where her family operated a small business. She graduated from Hillsboro High School before earning a Bachelor of Arts in International Politics from American University in Washington, D.C., in 2005, with a concentration in International Politics. While at American University, she participated in the Public Affairs Leadership Program, received a Dean's Scholarship, and was active in community service initiatives.

She received a Juris Doctor from the University of Oregon School of Law in 2009. During law school, she graduated in the top fifth of her class and earned certificates in Pro Bono Service, Public Interest and Public Service, and International Law. She was a Wayne Morse Fellow, received the Halderman, Risley, and Morgan scholarships, and worked as a research assistant for faculty members as well as at Navdanya in India. Her student publication, Reproductive Outsourcing to India: WTO Obligations in the Absence of U.S. National Legislation, was published in the Journal of World Trade in 2009 and received second place in the Andrew P. Vance Writing Competition.

== Career ==
=== Legal career ===
Following graduation, Stephenson joined the Law Office of Mary-Alice Coleman in Davis, California, where she represented employees in discrimination and employment litigation. Her practice included trial preparation, depositions, legal research, and courtroom advocacy.

From 2011 to 2012, she was judicial clerk to Judge Marilyn E. Litzenberger of the Multnomah County Circuit Court, drafting judicial opinions involving employment, commercial, landlord-tenant, foreclosure, and personal injury litigation while assisting with courtroom administration and jury management.

Stephenson later joined Mitra Law Group in Portland, where she practiced employment and civil rights law. Her work focused on workplace discrimination, harassment, retaliation, wage claims, and other employment-related disputes. She subsequently established Stephenson Law LLC before co-founding the Portland law firm Meyer Stephenson, where she continued representing workers and advising employers on compliance with state and federal employment laws. In addition to litigation, she contributed to legislative efforts relating to workplace protections, including the Oregon Workplace Fairness Act and Paid Family and Medical Leave legislation.

== Political career ==
Stephenson first sought elective office in 2020 elections, as a Democratic candidate for Oregon's 33rd House district but was defeated in the Democratic primary by Maxine Dexter.

In 2022, following Labor Commissioner Val Hoyle's decision to seek election to the United States House of Representatives, Stephenson entered the nonpartisan election for Commissioner of the Oregon Bureau of Labor and Industries. She advanced from the primary election and defeated former Republican legislator Cheri Helt in the general election, taking office in January 2023 as Oregon's 11th Labor Commissioner.

As Labor Commissioner, Stephenson is chief executive of the Bureau of Labor and Industries and chairs the Oregon State Apprenticeship and Training Council. The agency administers Oregon's labor standards, civil rights protections in employment, housing and public accommodations, wage and hour enforcement, child labor regulation, and registered apprenticeship programs.

During her tenure, the bureau has undergone unprecedented growth to address case backlogs, strengthen enforcement of wage and discrimination laws, strengthen registered apprenticeship opportunities, and improve agency operations. Stephenson founded the agency’s alternative dispute resolution program, which recovered over $3 million for workers in its first year. Stephenson also codified the Employer Assistance Division at the Bureau, ushering in new tools for employers. The agency has also recovered millions of dollars in unpaid wages and damages for Oregon workers and supported legislative reforms concerning child labor protections.

In 2026, Stephenson was re-elected to a second term as Labor Commissioner, defeating challenger Chris Lynch in a nonpartisan election held during the May primary.

== Other activities ==
Stephenson has been on the Multnomah County Commission on Economic Dignity and the Oregon Legislative Workgroup on lowering prescription drug prices. She has also been active in professional organizations including the Oregon State Bar Litigation Section, the Oregon Trial Lawyers Association, Oregon Women Lawyers, the Multnomah Bar Association, and the Owen M. Panner American Inn of Court. Earlier in her career, she completed formal mediation and restorative justice training through the Appropriate Dispute Resolution Center and participated in judicial externships with the United States District Court for the District of Oregon and legal fellowships focused on environmental and constitutional law.

Selected publication

- Stephenson, C. E. (2009). Reproductive outsourcing to India: WTO obligations in the absence of U.S. national legislation. Journal of World Trade.

== Electoral history ==
2022 Oregon Commissioner of Labor election
Party	Candidate	Votes	%
Nonpartisan	Christina E Stephenson	916,455	60.7
Nonpartisan	Cheri Helt	582,609	38.6
Write-in		9,826	0.7
Total votes		1,508,890	100%

2026 Oregon Commissioner of Labor election
Party	Candidate	Votes	%
Nonpartisan	Christina E Stephenson	5,595,583	63.22
Nonpartisan	Chris Lynch	341,903	36.29
Write-in		4,535	0.49
Total votes		942,021	100%

Political offices
Preceded by Val Hoyle	Labor Commissioner of Oregon; 2023–present	Incumbent
