= Dan Gardner (politician) =

American politician

Commissioner of the Oregon Bureau of Labor and Industries
- In office January 6, 2003 – April 7, 2008
- Governor: Ted Kulongoski
- Preceded by: Jack Roberts
- Succeeded by: Brad Avakian

Member of the Oregon House of Representatives from the 13th district
- In office January 13, 1997 – January 12, 2003
- Preceded by: Kate Brown
- Succeeded by: Robert Ackerman

Personal details
- Born: 1958 (age 67–68)
- Party: Democratic
- Profession: Electrician

Dan Gardner (born 1958) is an American politician from the State of Oregon. A member of the Democratic Party, he served as Commissioner of the Oregon Bureau of Labor and Industries from 2003 to 2008. An electrician by profession, he was elected Commissioner of Labor and Industries in 2002 and reelected in 2006. He resigned in 2008 to take a job with the International Brotherhood of Electrical Workers in Washington, D.C.

== Personal background ==
Gardner worked as an electrician for 28 years. Prior to entering politics, he was active as a union leader.

== Political career ==
Gardner entered politics by running for and winning a seat in the Oregon House of Representatives as a Democrat in 1996. He represented the 13th District until 2002. He served in the Democratic leadership as Assistant Democratic Leader and House Leader.

In 2002, Gardner ran for and won the nonpartisan office of Commissioner of the Oregon Bureau of Labor and Industries. He was reelected without opposition in 2006.

In 2008, Gardner considered running for Congress in Oregon's 5th congressional district, but chose not to run. Instead, he took a position as a lobbyist for the International Brotherhood of Electrical Workers in Washington, D.C. He announced his resignation as Commissioner of Labor and Industries in March 2008 and left office on April 7. Governor Ted Kulongoski appointed Brad Avakian to replace him.

== See also ==
- Oregon Bureau of Labor and Industries
- Oregon House of Representatives
- International Brotherhood of Electrical Workers
