= Navdanya (NGO) =

India-based non-governmental organization

Navdanya is an Indian-based non-governmental organisation which promotes biodiversity conservation, biodiversity, organic farming, the rights of farmers, and the process of seed saving. One of Navdanya's founders, and prominent members, is Vandana Shiva, an environmental activist, physicist, and author. Navdanya began in 1984 as a program of the Research Foundation for Science, Technology and Ecology (RFSTE), a participatory research initiative founded by the environmentalist Vandana Shiva, to provide direction and support to environmental activism. "Navdanya" means "nine crops" that represent India's collective source of food security.

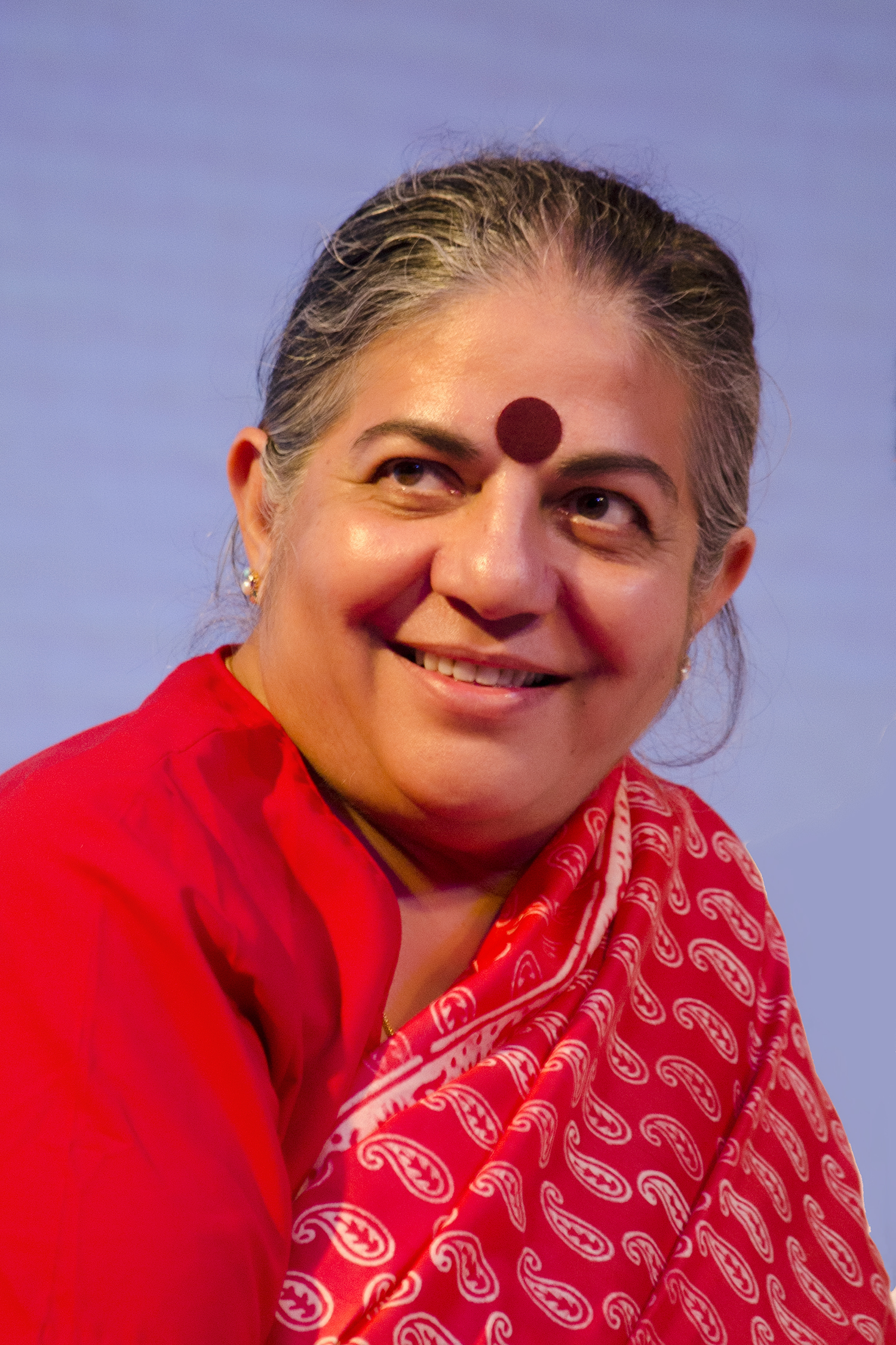
Vandana Shiva, one of the founders of Navdanya (2014)

Navdanya is a member of the Terra Madre slow food movement. Navdanya is a network of seed keepers and organic producers spread across 16 states in India.

Navdanya has helped set up 54 community seed banks across the country, trained over 500,000 farmers in "food sovereignty" and sustainable agriculture over the past two decades, and helped set up the largest direct marketing, fair trade organic network in the country. Navdanya has also set up a learning center, Bija Vidyapeeth (School of the Seed) on its biodiversity conservation and organic farm in Doon Valley, Uttarakhand, north India.

It has criticised genetic engineering. Navdanya claims to be a women-centred movement for the protection of biological and cultural diversity.

== Save a Seed ==
20th Century farming revolutionised traditional food production methods by using cheap (but non renewable) hydrocarbon fuels and agricultural chemical products which make a major contribution to greenhouse gas emissions, blamed for causing climate change. These new methods together with cheap transport and fuel led to the optimisation and industrialization of food production.

Navdanya's Seeds of Freedom campaign is intended to provide a source or exchange of diverse naturally occurring crop-seed

== GMO free campaign ==
Since 1991 they have been campaigning against GM crops and food in India. Working with citizens' movements, grassroot organisations, NGOs and governments, they have made significant contributions to the Convention on Biological Diversity (CBD) and the Biosafety Protocol.

During the WTO Hong Kong Ministerial, Navdanya joined 740 other organisations in presenting their opposition to the WTO's stance on GMOs.

== Biopiracy ==
RFSTE/ Navdanya started the campaign against biopiracy with the Neem Campaign in 1994 and mobilised 100,000 signatures against neem patents and filed a legal opposition against the USDA and WR Grace patent on the fungicidal properties of neem (no. 436257 B1) in the European Patent Office (EPO) at Munich, Germany.

Along with RFSTE, the International Federation of Organic Agriculture Movements (IFOAM) of Germany and Ms. Magda Alvoet, former Green Member of the European Parliament were party to the challenge. The patent on Neem was revoked in May 2000 and it was reconfirmed on 8 March 2005 when the EPO revoked in entirety the controversial patent, and adjudged that there was "no inventive step" involved in the fungicide patent, thus confirming the 'prior art' of the use of Neem.

The next victory against "biopiracy" for Navdanya came in October 2004 when the European Patent Office in Munich revoked Monsanto's patent on the Indian variety of wheat "Nap Hal". This was the third consecutive victory on the IPR front after Neem and Basmati. Monsanto was assigned a patent (EP 0445929 B1) on wheat on 21 May 2003 by the European Patent Office in Munich under the simple title "plants". On January 27, 2004 Research Foundation for Science Technology and Ecology (RFSTE) along with Greenpeace and Bharat Krishak Samaj BKS) filed a petition at the European Patent Office (EPO), Munich, challenging the patent rights given to Monsanto on Indian Landrace of wheat, Nap Hal. The patent was revoked in October 2004.
