= Brad Avakian =

American politician

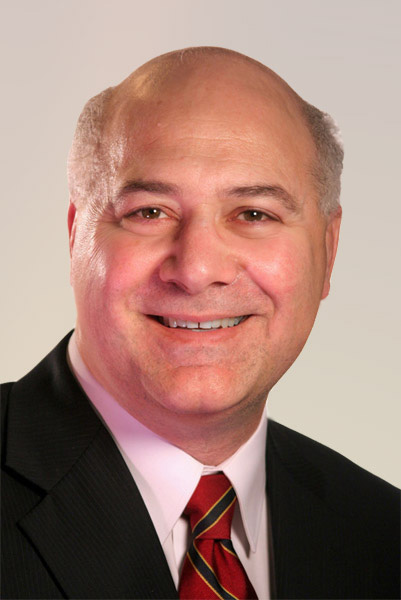
- Avakian in 2008

Labor Commissioner of Oregon
- In office April 8, 2008 – January 7, 2019
- Governor: Ted Kulongoski; John Kitzhaber; Kate Brown
- Preceded by: Dan Gardner
- Succeeded by: Val Hoyle

Member of the Oregon Senate from the 17th district
- In office January 2, 2007 – April 8, 2008
- Preceded by: Charlie Ringo
- Succeeded by: Suzanne Bonamici

Member of the Oregon House of Representatives from the 34th district
- In office January 2, 2003 – January 2, 2007
- Preceded by: Charlie Ringo
- Succeeded by: Suzanne Bonamici

Personal details
- Born: Bradley Paul Avakian; February 4, 1961 (age 65) Fresno, California, U.S.
- Party: Democratic
- Spouse: Deborah Avakian
- Education: Oregon State University, Corvallis (BA); Lewis and Clark College (JD)
- Website: Official website

Brad Peter Avakian (born February 4, 1961) is an American politician who served as a Democrat in the Oregon House, the Oregon Senate, and as the state's nonpartisan elected Labor Commissioner.

He was appointed Labor Commissioner by Governor Ted Kulongoski on April 8, 2008, and was subsequently elected statewide on November 4, 2008. He was re-elected in 2012 and 2014.

In 2016, he was the Democratic nominee for Oregon Secretary of State and was defeated by former state representative Dennis Richardson.

== Early life ==
Born in Fresno, California, he is the son of Larry and Catherine Avakian. He is of Armenian descent. His grandparents came what is now Turkey; grandfather Avak Avakian, immigrated from Muş in 1898 and his grandmother, Sirpoohi Antoyan, came from Bitlis in 1900.

Avakian was raised in Washington County, Oregon. He was educated in Oregon's public schools and graduated with a Juris doctor from Lewis & Clark Law School in 1990. He helped create the YMCA's Juvenile Restitution Program while in law school.

Avakian then worked as a civil rights attorney. He co-founded the Oregon League of Conservation Voters' (OLCV) Washington County chapter, and he was appointed by Governor Barbara Roberts to lead the State Board of Psychologist Examiners. He served as Honorary Chair of the Oregon Business Leadership Network, a coalition of employers committed to hiring the disabled. Avakian lives in the Portland metropolitan area in the city of Beaverton.

== Political career ==
Avakian ran for the Oregon State Senate in 1998, losing to incumbent Republican Tom Hartung.

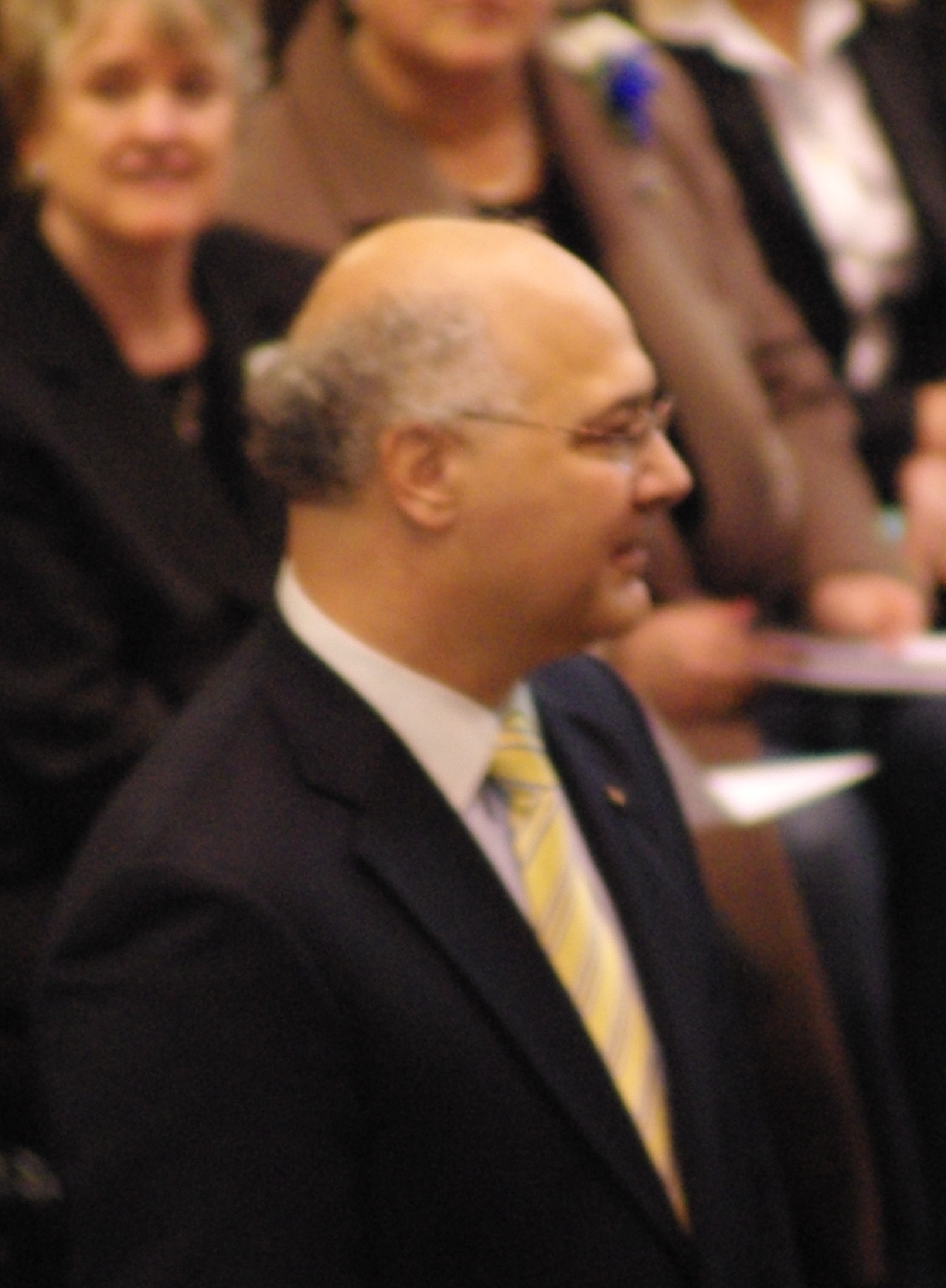
Avakian at opening of 2009 legislature

Avakian was elected to represent District 34, on Portland's west side, in the Oregon House of Representatives in 2002. He defeated Portland police officer John Scruggs, the only Republican to lose in Washington County that year, with 53 percent of the vote.

Avakian was elected to the Oregon State Senate, representing District 17, in 2006.

While in the legislature, Avakian was honored by both the Oregon AFL-CIO and the SEIU Local 503 for his work on behalf of working families. In the state Senate he chaired the Environment and Natural Resources Committee, and in 2007 the OLCV named him the "Consensus Builder of the Year," recognizing him for passing an extension of the Oregon Bottle Bill and a renewable energy act. In 2008 he led a coalition to approve water supply development for rural communities.

In July 2007, Avakian announced his candidacy for the Democratic nomination for Oregon Secretary of State. He later withdrew from the race when he was appointed by governor Ted Kulongoski to be Commissioner of the Oregon Bureau of Labor and Industries in early 2008 after Dan Gardner announced his resignation. Gardner was the first Commissioner of Labor and Industries to leave mid-term for a new job.

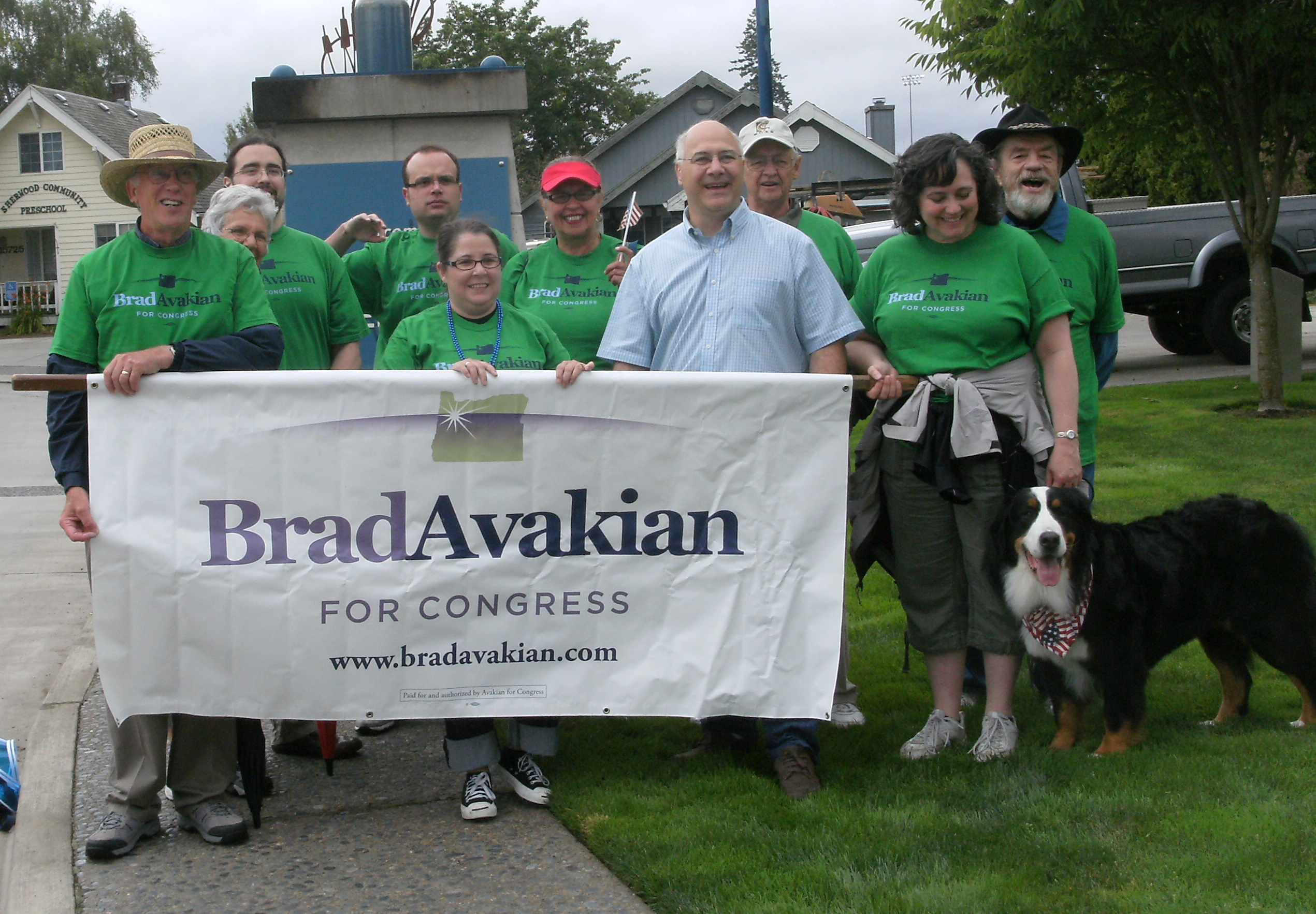
Avakian with supporters of his congressional bid

In April 2011, Avakian announced that he would seek the Democratic nomination for Oregon's 1st congressional district in the United States House of Representatives. The seat was held by fellow Democrat David Wu, who resigned from Congress before the end of his term due to allegations of sexual misconduct. Avakian lost in the Democratic primary to Suzanne Bonamici, who succeeded him in both the Oregon House and Senate.

In July 2015, Avakian ordered Aaron and Melissa Klein, owners of Sweet Cakes by Melissa in Gresham, to pay a lesbian couple $135,000 in damages for unlawful discrimination in public accommodations after the bakery refusing to make a cake for the couple's wedding. The owners cited their Christian beliefs against same-sex marriage. The Kleins' appealed in the Oregon Court of Appeals, but the ruling was upheld. However, the Supreme Court vacated this ruling and sent it back to the Court of Appeals of Oregon to rule in a manner consistent with the case Masterpiece Cakeshop v. Colorado Civil Rights Commission.

On November 8, 2016, Avakian lost his bid for Oregon Secretary of State to Republican Dennis Richardson, the first time a Republican was elected to statewide office in Oregon since 2002.

Avakian announced in July 2017 he would not seek reelection to a third full term.

=== Electoral history ===
2004 Oregon State Representative, 34th district
| Party | Candidate | Votes | % |
|---|---|---|---|
| Democratic | Brad Avakian | 17,835 | 96.6 |
| Write-in | | 635 | 3.4 |
| Total votes | | 18,470 | 100% |

Oregon State Senate 17th District Democratic Primary Election, 2006
| Party | Candidate | Votes | % |
| Democratic | Brad Avakian | 7,180 | 63.12 |
| Democratic | Sam Chase | 4,171 | 36.67 |
| Democratic | Write-ins | 24 | 0.21 |

2006 Oregon State Senator, 17th district
| Party | Candidate | Votes | % |
|---|---|---|---|
| Democratic | Brad Avakian | 31,612 | 67.2 |
| Republican | Piotr Kuklinski | 13,497 | 28.7 |
| Libertarian | Richard Whitehead | 1,445 | 3.1 |
| Constitution | John R. Pivarnik | 371 | 0.8 |
| Write-in | | 89 | 0.2 |
| Total votes | | 47,014 | 100% |

2008 Commissioner of the Bureau of Labor and Industries
| Party | Candidate | Votes | % |
|---|---|---|---|
| Nonpartisan | Brad Avakian | 690,000 | 67.2 |
| Nonpartisan | Pavel Goberman | 184,919 | 18.0 |
| Nonpartisan | Mark Welyczko | 135,666 | 13.2 |
| Write-in | | 16,056 | 1.6 |
| Total votes | | 1,026,641 | 100% |

Oregon 1st Congressional District Special Democratic Primary Election, 2011
| Party | Candidate | Votes | % |
| Democratic | Suzanne Bonamici | 49,721 | 65.18 |
| Democratic | Brad Avakian | 16,963 | 22.24 |
| Democratic | Brad Witt | 6,003 | 7.87 |
| Democratic | Dan Strite | 1,212 | 1.59 |
| Democratic | Dominic Hammon | 923 | 1.21 |
| Democratic | Todd Lee Ritter | 651 | 0.85 |
| Democratic | Write-ins | 469 | 0.61 |
| Democratic | Saba Ahmed | 250 | 0.33 |
| Democratic | Robert Lettin | 91 | 0.12 |

2012 Oregon Commissioner of Labor election
| Party | Candidate | Votes | % |
|---|---|---|---|
| Nonpartisan | Brad Avakian | 681,987 | 52.5 |
| Nonpartisan | Bruce Starr | 606,735 | 46.7 |
| Write-in | | 9,616 | 0.7 |
| Total votes | | 1,298,338 | 100% |

2016 Oregon Secretary of State election
| Party | Candidate | Votes | % |
|---|---|---|---|
| Republican | Dennis Richardson | 892,669 | 47.4 |
| Democratic | Brad Avakian | 814,089 | 43.2 |
| Independent | Paul Damian Wells | 64,956 | 3.4 |
| Pacific Green | Alan Zundel | 47,576 | 2.5 |
| Libertarian | Sharon L Durbin | 46,975 | 2.5 |
| Constitution | Michael Marsh | 15,269 | 0.8 |
| Write-in | | 2,646 | 0.1 |
| Total votes | | 1,884,180 | 100% |

Political offices
| Preceded by Dan Gardner | Labor Commissioner of Oregon; 2008–2019 | Succeeded by Val Hoyle |
