= Val Hoyle =

American politician (born 1964)

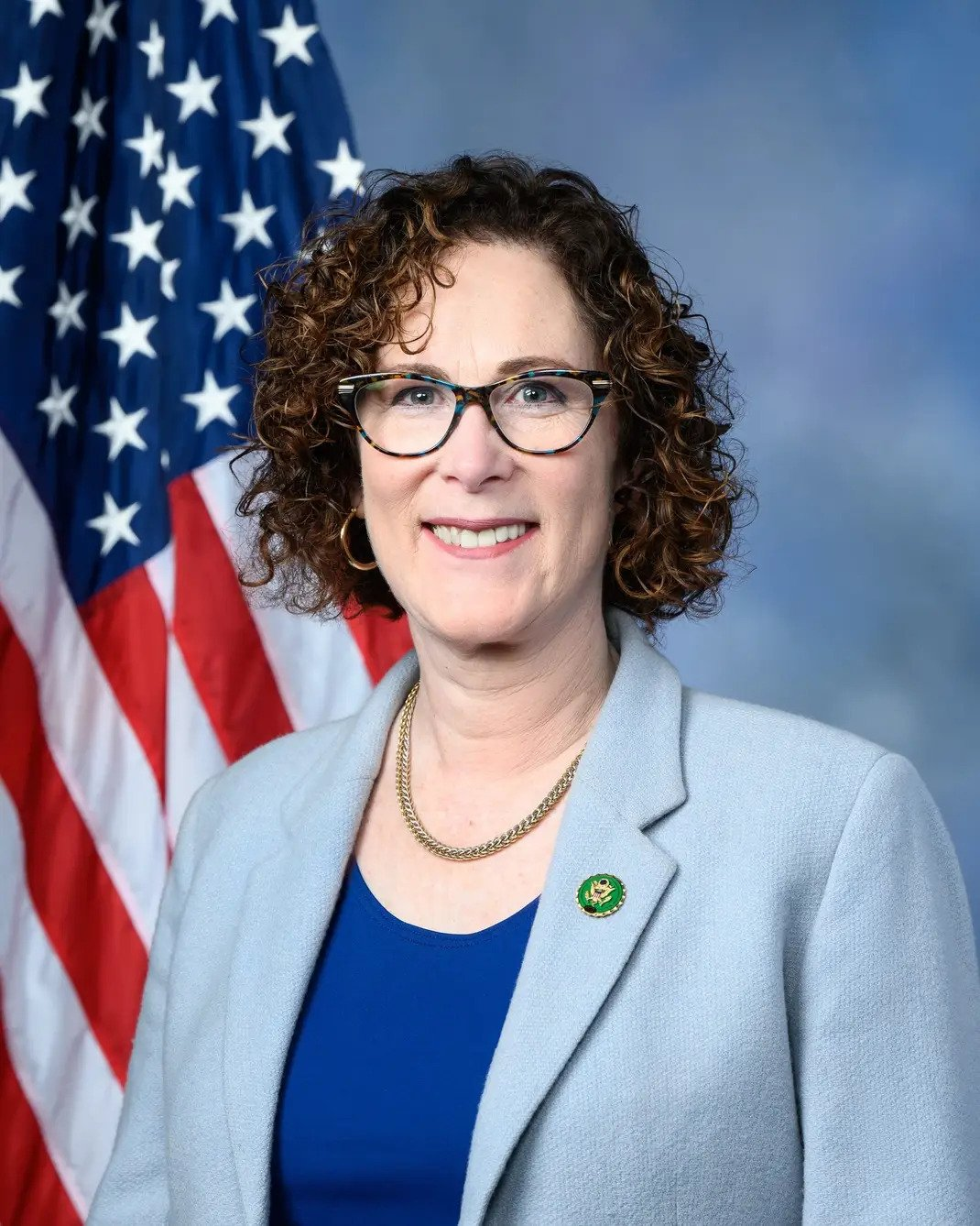
- Official portrait, 2023

Member of the U.S. House of Representatives from Oregon's 4th district
- Incumbent
- Assumed office January 3, 2023
- Preceded by: Peter DeFazio

Labor Commissioner of Oregon
- In office January 7, 2019 – January 2, 2023
- Governor: Kate Brown
- Preceded by: Brad Avakian
- Succeeded by: Christina Stephenson

Majority Leader of the Oregon House of Representatives
- In office January 14, 2013 – July 10, 2015
- Preceded by: Tina Kotek (Democratic Leader)
- Succeeded by: Jennifer Williamson

Member of the Oregon House of Representatives from the 14th district
- In office January 12, 2009 – January 9, 2017
- Preceded by: Chris Edwards
- Succeeded by: Julie Fahey

Personal details
- Born: Valerie Anne Toomey; February 14, 1964 (age 62) Fairfield, California, U.S.
- Party: Democratic
- Spouse: Stephen Hoyle
- Children: 2
- Education: Bunker Hill Community College (attended); Emmanuel College (BA)
- Website: House website Campaign website

Valerie Anne Hoyle (née Toomey; born February 14, 1964) is an American politician serving as the U.S. representative for Oregon's 4th congressional district since 2023. Previously, she served as the commissioner of Oregon's Bureau of Labor and Industries from 2019 to 2023 and as a member of the Oregon House of Representatives from 2009 to 2017, serving as majority leader from 2013 to 2015. She is a member of the Democratic Party.

Hoyle was first elected to Congress in 2022.

== Early life and education ==
Val Toomey was born on Travis Air Force Base in Fairfield, California, in 1964. She grew up in Nashua, New Hampshire, where her father Dan Toomey was a firefighter, union official, and later a member of the New Hampshire House of Representatives. She attended Presentation of Mary Academy in Hudson and graduated from Merrimack High School in 1983. She earned a Bachelor of Arts degree in political science from Emmanuel College in Boston.

== Early political career ==
In 1999, Hoyle moved to Lane County, Oregon, where she joined the education advocacy group Stand for Children. Before serving in the Oregon legislature, she worked in sales and marketing for bicycle manufacturers Burley Design and Cane Creek, and served as legislative aide and policy analyst for State Senator Floyd Prozanski. She was also a director of the United Way of Lane County.

=== Oregon House of Representatives ===
Hoyle was appointed to the Oregon House of Representatives in August 2009 to replace Chris Edwards, who was appointed to the Oregon State Senate. In 2010, she was reelected to a full term, defeating Republican Dwight Coon and Independent Kevin Prociw. On November 6, 2012, Hoyle again defeated Coon to win a second full term.

Before the 2011 legislative session, Hoyle was elected assistant caucus leader of the Oregon House Democrats. During the 2011 legislative session, she was co-vice chair of the House Subcommittee on Higher Education, and served on the House Committees on Health Care and Business & Labor. She also served on the Governor's Health Care Transformation Team.

On November 15, 2012, after House Democrats selected Tina Kotek as speaker of the Oregon House, Hoyle was elected to lead the Oregon House Democrats as House majority leader for the 2013 Legislative Session. During the 2013 legislative session, she co-chaired the House Task Force on O&C Counties and was vice chair of the House Committee on Rules.

Shortly before the 2014 legislative session, former State Representative Chris Garrett received an executive appointment to the Oregon Court of Appeals and Hoyle was named chair of the House Committee on Rules. Hoyle also served as a legislative co-chair of the Oregon Elder Abuse Prevention Workgroup.

After Oregon Governor John Kitzhaber resigned in February 2015, elevating Kate Brown to the governorship, The Oregonian named Hoyle as a possible successor to Brown as Oregon Secretary of State. Hoyle stepped down as majority leader in 2015 to run for Oregon secretary of state. In the 2016 Democratic primary, she came in second place, receiving 33.81% of the vote to Democratic nominee Brad Avakian's 39.06%.

=== Labor commissioner ===
In 2018, Hoyle ran to become Oregon's 10th labor commissioner, a nonpartisan elected position. She won the race outright in May, receiving 52% of the vote and winning 17 of 36 counties. Former Tualatin Mayor Lou Ogden received 36% and Jack Howard, a La Grande attorney and former Union County Commissioner, received 12%. The Commissioner of the Bureau of Labor and Industries serves a four-year term, has offices in Portland, Eugene, and Salem, oversees enforcement of wage and hour laws, including prevailing wage and civil rights enforcement, certifies apprenticeship programs, and provides employment law technical assistance for employers.

== U.S. House of Representatives ==
=== Elections ===
==== 2022 ====
On December 1, 2021, Hoyle announced her candidacy for Oregon's 4th congressional district in the United States House of Representatives in 2022. The seat was held by fellow Democrat and New England native Peter DeFazio, who announced that he was not running for reelection after 18 terms. Polling conducted by Public Policy Polling in March 2022 found Hoyle to be favored in the Democratic primary. She benefited from more than $500,000 in spending by super PACs during the primary. In November 2022 Hoyle was elected to the House.

==== 2026 ====
She was endorsed by Leading the Future super PAC backed by Andreessen Horowitz and OpenAI and went on to win her primary.

=== Tenure ===
In the House, Hoyle has generally voted with the majority of other Democratic members, but there are exceptions. On January 31, 2023, Hoyle was among seven Democrats to vote for H.R.497:Freedom for Health Care Workers Act, a bill which would lift COVID-19 vaccine mandates for healthcare workers.

In 2023, Hoyle was among 56 Democrats to vote in favor of H.Con.Res. 21 which directed President Joe Biden to remove U.S. troops from Syria within 180 days.

Hoyle was among the 46 Democrats who voted against final passage of the Fiscal Responsibility Act of 2023 in the House.

In January 2026, Hoyle was one of 4 Democrats who voted to block funding for federally driven “kill switch” vehicle technology, which could monitor drivers and intervene in vehicle operation.

=== Committee assignments ===
- Committee on Transportation and Infrastructure
  - Subcommittee on Highways and Transit
  - Subcommittee on Aviation
- United States House Committee on Natural Resources
  - Subcommittee for Water, Wildlife and Fisheries
  - Subcommittee on Indian and Insular Affairs

=== Caucus memberships ===
- Congressional Progressive Caucus
- Congressional Equality Caucus
- Labor Caucus
- New Democrat Coalition
- Congressional Steel Caucus
- Congressional Ukraine Caucus
- Congressional Freethought Caucus

== Political positions ==
Hoyle was one of 46 House Democrats who joined Republicans to vote for the Laken Riley Act. She then switched to a no vote on final passage.

== Personal life ==
Hoyle lives outside Springfield, Oregon, and is married with two adult children.

Hoyle is Roman Catholic.

== Electoral history ==
2010 Oregon State Representative, 14th district
Party	Candidate	Votes	%
Democratic	Val Hoyle	11,336	50.4
Republican	Dwight Coon	10,041	44.6
Independent	Kevin Prociw	1,078	4.8
Write-in		51	0.2
Total votes		22,506	100%

2012 Oregon State Representative, 14th district
Party	Candidate	Votes	%
Democratic	Val Hoyle	14,413	54.3
Republican	Dwight Coon	11,309	42.6
Libertarian	Sharon A Mahler	790	3.0
Write-in		38	0.1
Total votes		26,550	100%

2014 Oregon State Representative, 14th district
Party	Candidate	Votes	%
Democratic	Val Hoyle	12,370	55.6
Republican	Kathy Lamberg	9,769	43.9
Write-in		94	0.4
Total votes		22,233	100%

2018 Oregon Commissioner of Labor election
Party	Candidate	Votes	%
Nonpartisan	Val Hoyle	375,762	52.3
Nonpartisan	Lou Ogden	253,977	35.3
Nonpartisan	Jack Howard	86,477	12.0
Write-in		2,520	0.4
Total votes		718,736	100%

2022 US House of Representatives, Oregon's 4th congressional district
Party	Candidate	Votes	%
Democratic	Val Hoyle	171,372	50.5
Republican	Alek Skarlatos	146,055	43.1
Independent	Levi Leatherberry	9,052	2.7
Constitution	Jim Howard	6,075	1.8
Pacific Green	Mike Beilstein	6,033	1.8
Write-in		490	0.1
Total votes		339,077	100%

2024 US House of Representatives, Oregon's 4th congressional district
Party	Candidate	Votes	%
Democratic	Val Hoyle	195,862	51.7
Republican	Monique DeSpain	166,430	43.9
Pacific Green	Justin Filip	10,315	2.7
Libertarian	Dan Bahlen	5,704	1.5
Write-in		454	0.1
Total votes		378,765	100%

Oregon House of Representatives
Preceded by Tina Kotek	Majority Leader of the Oregon House of Representatives; 2013–2015	Succeeded by Jennifer Williamson
Political offices
Preceded by Brad Avakian	Labor Commissioner of Oregon; 2019–2023	Succeeded by Christina Stephenson
U.S. House of Representatives
Preceded by Peter DeFazio	Member of the U.S. House of Representatives from Oregon's 4th congressional district 2023–present	Incumbent
U.S. order of precedence (ceremonial)
Preceded by Erin Houchin	United States representatives by seniority 315th	Succeeded by Wesley Hunt
