= Oregon Commissioner of Labor =

Elected constitutional officer

Commissioner of Labor and Industries of Oregon
- Great Seal of the State of Oregon

- State flag

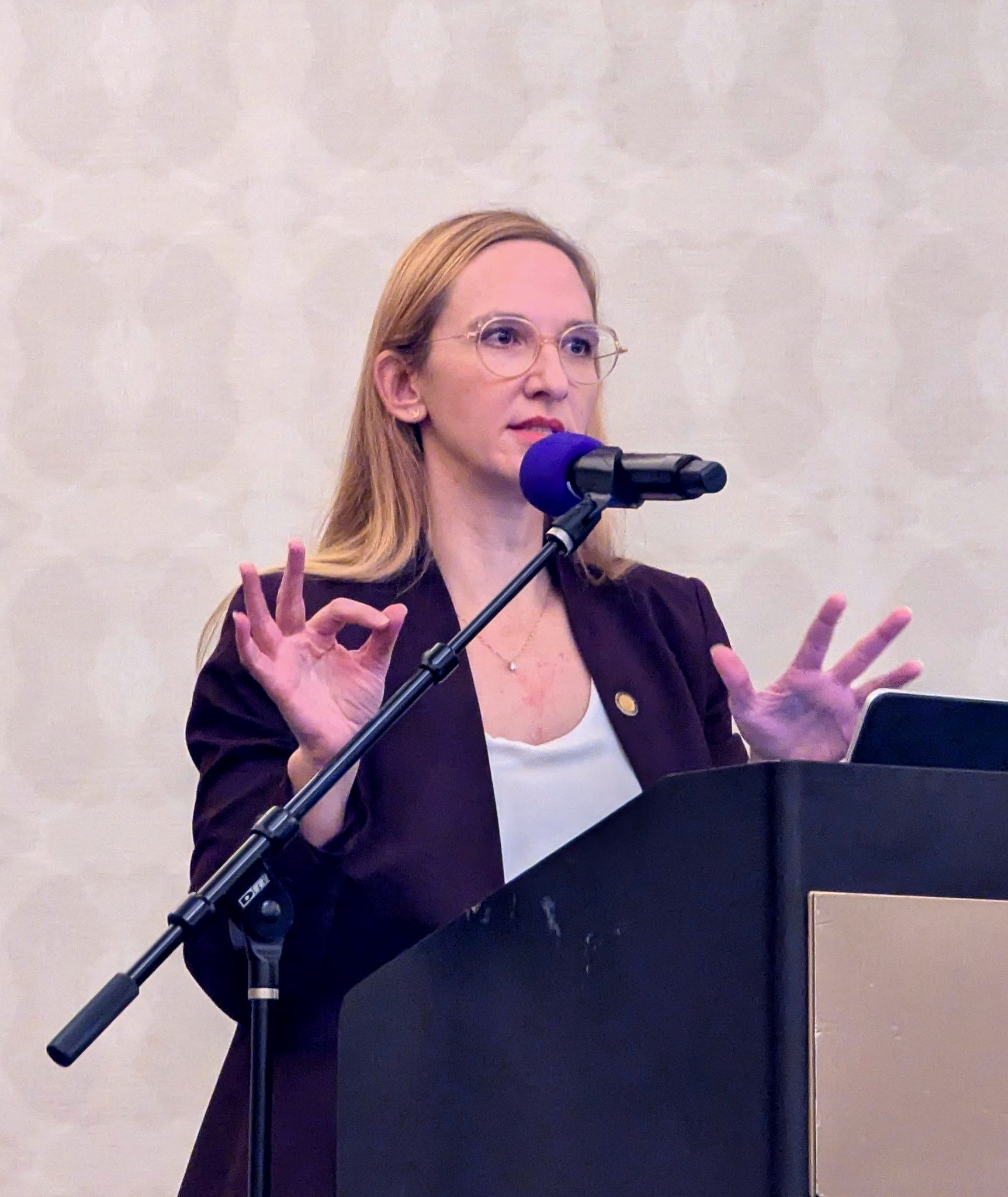
- Incumbent; Christina Stephenson since January 2, 2023
- Government of Oregon
- Term length: 4 years, renewable with no limit
- Inaugural holder: O. P. Hoff
- Formation: 1903 (by statute)
- Unofficial names: Oregon Labor Commissioner
- Website: Official website

The Oregon Commissioner of Labor and Industries is an elected government position in the U.S. state of Oregon. The commissioner is the chief executive of Oregon Bureau of Labor and Industries and serves a four-year term.

The commissioner is also chairperson of the State Apprenticeship and Training Council and executive secretary of the Wage and Hour Commission. The commissioner enforces state laws related to employment, housing, and public accommodation with respect to discrimination, wages, hours of employment, working conditions, prevailing wage rates, and child labor. The commissioner also enforces state laws prohibiting discrimination related to vocational, professional, and trade schools, and administers licensing required by many professional services. The commissioner oversees the Wage Security Fund, a source of coverage for unpaid wages in some business closure and group health situations.

The current commissioner is Christina Stephenson, elected in 2022.

== History ==
Upon inception, from 1903, the position was titled Oregon Labor Commissioner until 1918. It was called Oregon Commissioner of the Bureau of Labor Statistics and Inspector of Factories and Workshops from 1918 until 1930. It became Oregon Commissioner of the Bureau of Labor from 1930 to 1979 when the legislature changed it to Oregon Commissioner of Labor and Industries.

11 individuals have served as commissioner since the office's inception. Party affiliation is included, though the legislature made the position a nonpartisan office in 1995; the first nonpartisan election was in 1998.

== List of Oregon commissioners of labor ==
#	Name	Party	Term	Elected or reelected
1	O. P. Hoff	Republican	June 2, 1903 – January 6, 1919	1903 appointment by Governor Chamberlain; elected in 1906, 1910, 1914
2	Charles H. Gram	Republican	January 6, 1919 – January 4, 1943	1918, 1922, 1926, 1930, 1934, 1938
3	W. E. Kimsey	Republican	January 4, 1943 – January 3, 1955	1942, 1946, 1950
4	Norman O. Nilsen	Democratic	January 3, 1955 – January 6, 1975	1954, 1958, 1962, 1966, 1970
5	Bill Stevenson	Democratic	January 6, 1975 – January 1, 1979	1974
6	Mary Wendy Roberts	Democratic	January 1, 1979 – January 2, 1995	1978, 1982, 1986, 1990
7	Jack Roberts	Republican	January 2, 1995 – January 6, 2003	1994, 1998
8	Dan Gardner	Democratic	January 6, 2003 – April 7, 2008	2002, 2006
9	Brad Avakian	Democratic	April 8, 2008 – January 7, 2019	appointment by Governor Kulongoski mid-2008 to replace resignation by Gardner; elected 2008, 2012, 2014
10	Val Hoyle	Democratic	January 7, 2019 – January 2, 2023	2018
11	Christina Stephenson	Democratic	January 2, 2023 – present	2022, 2026
