= 2026 United States Senate election in Oregon =

- November 3, 2026
- Reporting: 98% as of November 21, 2026, 8:17 PM PST
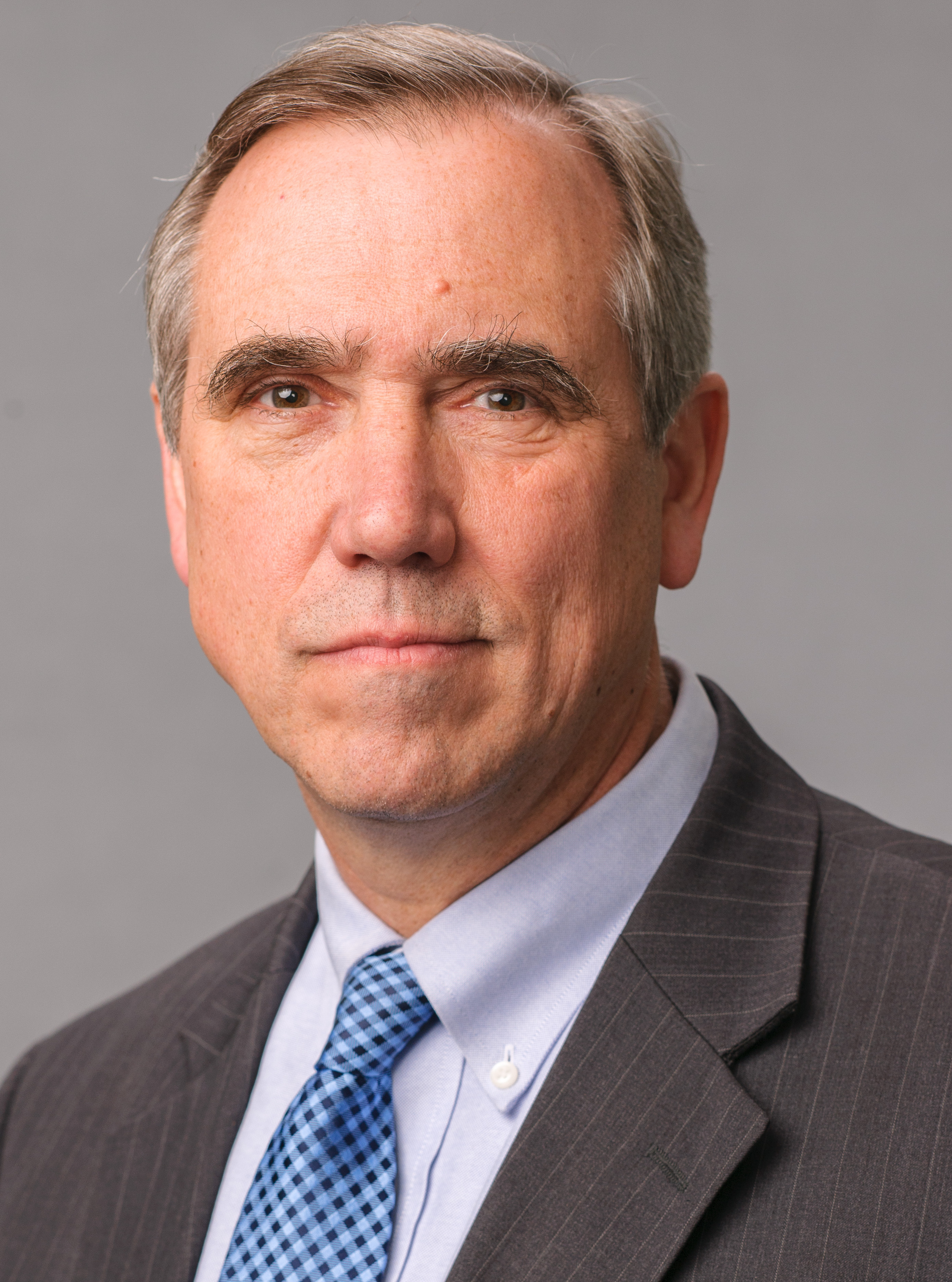

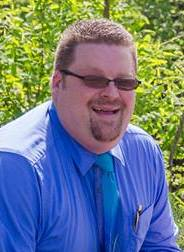
Nominee	Jeff Merkley	David Brock Smith
Party	Democratic	Republican
Popular vote	1,143,907	759,135
Percentage	58.1%	38.6%
- Merkley: 40–50% 50–60% 60–70% 80–90% Smith: 40–50% 50–60% 60–70% 70–80%
U.S. senator before election
Jeff Merkley
Democratic
Elected U.S. senator
Jeff Merkley
Democratic

The 2026 United States Senate election in Oregon was held on November 3, 2026, to elect a member of the United States Senate to represent the state of Oregon. Democratic incumbent Jeff Merkley was re-elected to a fourth term, defeating Republican state senator David Brock Smith.

In the Democratic primary, Merkley was nominated with 93.2% of the vote against minimal opposition. Smith won the Republican nomination with 29.5% of the vote over former Linn County party chair Jo Rae Perkins and real estate broker Brent Barker.

Merkley was reelected to a fourth term by just under 20 points. Based on unofficial results, the results by county were nearly identical to the 2020 election except for Jackson County, which narrowly flipped to Merkley. This election marked Merkley's strongest margin of victory in any of his four campaigns for U.S. Senate.

== Democratic primary ==
=== Candidates ===
==== Nominee ====
- Jeff Merkley, incumbent U.S. senator (2009–present)

==== Eliminated in primary ====
- Paul D. Wells, retired electrical engineer

==== Declined ====
- Suzanne Bonamici, U.S. representative from Oregon's 1st congressional district (2012–present) (running for re-election)

=== Endorsements ===
Jeff Merkley

Labor unions

- Oregon AFL-CIO

Organizations

- End Citizens United
- J Street
- Joint Action Committee for Political Affairs
- League of Conservation Voters
- Our Revolution
- Peace Action
- Planned Parenthood Action Fund
- Population Connection
- Track AIPAC

Newspapers

- Willamette Week

=== Fundraising ===
Campaign finance reports as of March 31, 2026
Candidate	Raised	Spent	Cash on hand
Jeff Merkley (D)	$7,150,950	$4,376,333	$6,580,178
Source: Federal Election Commission

=== Results ===
Results by county Merkley: 70–80%; 80–90%; 90–100%

Democratic primary results
Party	Candidate	Votes	%
Democratic	Jeff Merkley (incumbent)	457,006	93.2
Democratic	Paul D. Wells	30,544	6.2
Write-in		2,907	0.6
Total votes		490,457	100.0

== Republican primary ==
=== Candidates ===
==== Nominee ====
- David Brock Smith, state senator from the 1st district (2023–present)

==== Eliminated in primary ====
- Brent Barker, commercial real estate broker
- Deborah C. Brown, retired civil engineer
- David Burch, perennial candidate
- Russ McAlmond, businessman
- Jo Rae Perkins, former chair of the Linn County Republican Party and nominee for the U.S. Senate in 2020 and 2022
- Tim Skelton, Scoutmaster and security worker

Did Not File

- Joe Johnson, former candidate for Baker County Commission and Baker City Council
- Douglas T. Muck Jr., rancher

=== Fundraising ===
Campaign finance reports as of March 31, 2026
Candidate	Raised	Spent	Cash on hand
David Smith (R)	$24,083	$288	$23,795
Jo Rae Perkins (R)	$5,185	$7,328	$1,056
Source: Federal Election Commission

=== Results ===
Results by county Smith: 20–30%; 30–40%; 40–50%; 60–70%; Perkins: 20–30%; 30–40%; Barker: 20–30%

Republican primary results
Party	Candidate	Votes	%
Republican	David Brock Smith	107,953	29.5
Republican	Jo Rae Perkins	99,278	27.1
Republican	Brent Barker	85,229	23.3
Republican	Russ McAlmond	42,136	11.5
Republican	Deborah C. Brown	14,021	3.8
Republican	David Burch	8,704	2.4
Republican	Tim Skelton	5,626	1.5
Write-in		3,254	0.9
Total votes		366,201	100.0

== Third-party and independent candidates ==
=== Declared ===
- Gary Lyndon Dye, engineer (Libertarian)
- Chris Henry, truck driver (Progressive (Note: Cross-nominated by the Pacific Green Party.))

== General election ==
=== Predictions ===
Source	Ranking	As of
The Cook Political Report	Solid D	November 2, 2026
Decision Desk HQ	Safe D	November 3, 2026
The Economist (Note: The Economist's prediction model uses unconventional terminology. For the purpose of equivalency, their "Very Likely" ratings are formatted as a "Likely" rating while "Likely" ratings are formatted as a "Lean" rating.)	Safe D	November 3, 2026
FiftyPlusOne	Safe D	November 3, 2026
Fox News	Solid D	November 1, 2026
Inside Elections	Solid D	October 29, 2026
MS NOW	Safe D	October 29, 2026
NBC News	Solid D	November 3, 2026
RealClearPolitics	Solid D	November 2, 2026
Sabato's Crystal Ball	Safe D	November 2, 2026
Silver Bulletin	Solid D	November 3, 2026
Split Ticket	Safe D	November 2, 2026

=== Post-primary endorsements ===
Jeff Merkley (D)

Labor unions

- National Education Association

=== Fundraising ===
Campaign finance reports as of October 14, 2026
Candidate	Raised	Spent	Cash on hand
Jeff Merkley (D)	$8,729,810	$5,914,121	$6,621,250
David Brock Smith (R)	$311,174	$266,976	$44,198
Gary Lyndon Dye (L)	$10,577	$14,144	$179
Source: Federal Election Commission

=== Results ===
2026 United States Senate election in Oregon
Party	Candidate	Votes	%	±%
Democratic	Jeff Merkley (incumbent)			
Republican	David Brock Smith			
Libertarian	Gary Dye			
Progressive	Chris Henry			
Write-in				
Total votes			100.0	N/A

County that flipped from Republican to Democratic

- Jackson (largest city: Medford)
