= 2016 United States House of Representatives elections in Oregon =

Election in Oregon for the House

- November 8, 2016

All 5 Oregon seats to the United States House of Representatives
	Majority party	Minority party
Party	Democratic	Republican
Last election	4	1
Seats won	4	1
Seat change	Steady	Steady
Popular vote	1,026,851	730,894
Percentage	53.71%	38.23%
Swing	▲0.07%	▼1.95%

Democratic
40–50%
50–60%
60–70%
70–80%
Republican
40–50%
50–60%
60–70%
70–80%
80–90%

The 2016 United States House of Representatives elections in Oregon were held on November 8, 2016, to elect the five U.S. representatives from the State of Oregon, one from each of the state's 5 congressional districts. The elections coincided with the 2016 U.S. presidential election, as well a senatorial election and the special gubernatorial election, and elections to local offices. The primaries were held on May 17. All five incumbents were re-elected.

== Overview ==
=== Statewide ===
United States House of Representatives elections in Oregon, 2016
Party	Votes	Percentage	Seats	+/−
Democratic	1,026,851	53.71%	4	-
Republican	730,894	38.23%	1	-
Independents	78,154	4.09%	0	-
Progressive	27,978	1.46%	0	-
Pacific Green	24,736	1.29%	0	-
Libertarian	18,784	0.98%	0	-
write-ins	4,468	0.23%	0	-
Totals	1,911,865	100%	5	-

=== By District ===
Results of the 2016 United States House of Representatives elections in Oregon by district:

District	Democratic		Republican		Others		Total		Result
District	Votes	%	Votes	%	Votes	%	Votes	%	Result
District 1	225,391	59.61%	139,756	36.96%	12,948	3.42%	378,095	100.0%	Democratic hold
District 2	106,640	28.01%	272,952	71.69%	1,147	0.30%	380,739	100.0%	Republican hold
District 3	274,687	71.84%	0	0.00%	107,668	28.16%	382,355	100.0%	Democratic hold
District 4	220,628	55.49%	157,743	39.68%	19,197	4.83%	397,568	100.0%	Democratic hold
District 5	199,505	53.47%	160,443	43.00%	13,160	3.53%	373,108	100.0%	Democratic hold
Total	1,026,851	53.71%	730,894	38.23%	154,120	8.06%	1,911,865	100.0%	

== District 1 ==
2016 Oregon's 1st congressional district election
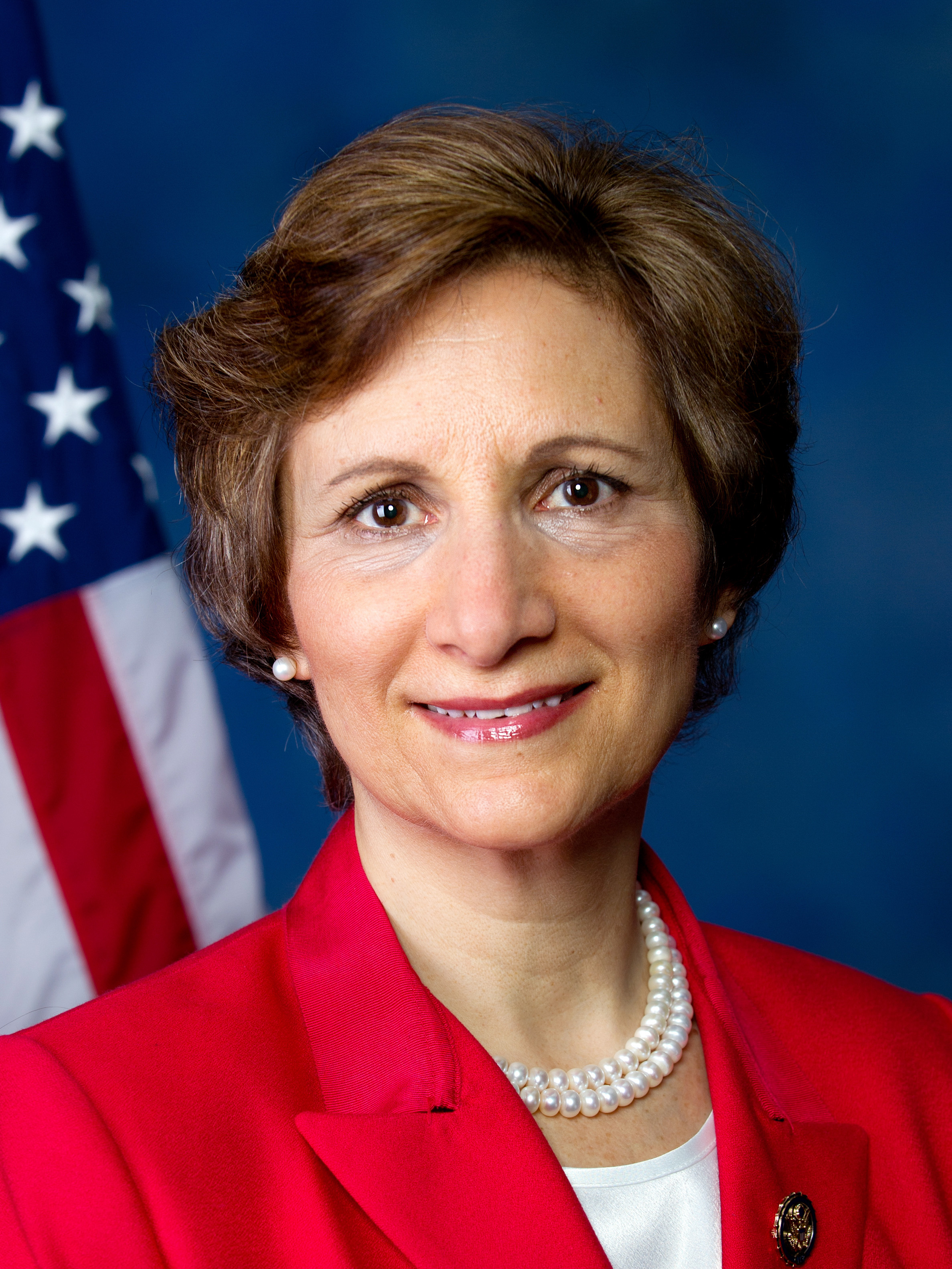

Nominee	Suzanne Bonamici	Brian Heinrich
Party	Democratic	Republican
Alliance	Independent Party
Popular vote	225,391	139,756
Percentage	59.6%	37.0%
- Precinct results Bonamici: 40–50% 50–60% 60–70% 70–80% 80–90% >90% Heinrich: 40–50% 50–60% 60–70% 70–80% 80–90% No votes
U.S. Representative before election
Suzanne Bonamici
Democratic
Elected U.S. Representative
Suzanne Bonamici
Democratic

The 1st district is located in the northwest corner of Oregon. Incumbent Democrat Suzanne Bonamici, who had represented the district since 2012, ran for re-election. She was re-elected with 57% of the vote in 2014. The district had a PVI of D+7.

=== Democratic primary ===
==== Candidates ====
- Suzanne Bonamici, incumbent U.S. Representative (D–Beaverton)

===== Eliminated in primary =====
- Shabba Woodley, videographer and poet

==== Results ====
Democratic primary results
Party	Candidate	Votes	%
Democratic	Suzanne Bonamici (incumbent)	99,153	89.8
Democratic	Shabba Woodley	10,961	9.9
Democratic	Write-ins	375	0.3
Total votes		110,489	100.0

=== Republican primary ===
==== Candidates ====
===== Nominee =====
- Brian J. Heinrich, sales representative

===== Eliminated in primary =====
- Jonathan E. Burgess
- Delinda Morgan, businesswoman, nominee for this seat in 2012, candidate in the 2012 (special) and in 2014

==== Results ====
Republican primary results
Party	Candidate	Votes	%
Republican	Brian J. Heinrich	19,290	48.5
Republican	Delinda Morgan	10,640	26.7
Republican	Jonathan E. Burgess	9,127	22.9
Republican	Write-ins	768	1.9
Total votes		39,825	100.0

=== Independent Party primary ===
==== Results ====
Independent primary results
Party	Candidate	Votes	%
Independent Party	Suzanne Bonamici (incumbent) (write-in)	855	58.2
Independent Party	write-ins	613	41.8
Total votes		1,468	100.0

=== Libertarian primary ===
==== Candidates ====
===== Nominee =====
- Kyle Sheahan

=== General election ===
==== Predictions ====
Source	Ranking	As of
The Cook Political Report	Safe D	November 7, 2016
Daily Kos Elections	Safe D	November 7, 2016
Rothenberg	Safe D	November 3, 2016
Sabato's Crystal Ball	Safe D	November 7, 2016
RCP	Safe D	October 31, 2016

==== Results ====
Oregon's 1st congressional district, 2016
Party	Candidate	Votes	%
Democratic	Suzanne Bonamici (incumbent)	225,391	59.6
Republican	Brian Heinrich	139,756	37.0
Libertarian	Kyle Sheahan	12,257	3.2
Write-in		691	0.2
Total votes		378,095	100.0
Democratic hold			

== District 2 ==
2016 Oregon's 2nd congressional district election
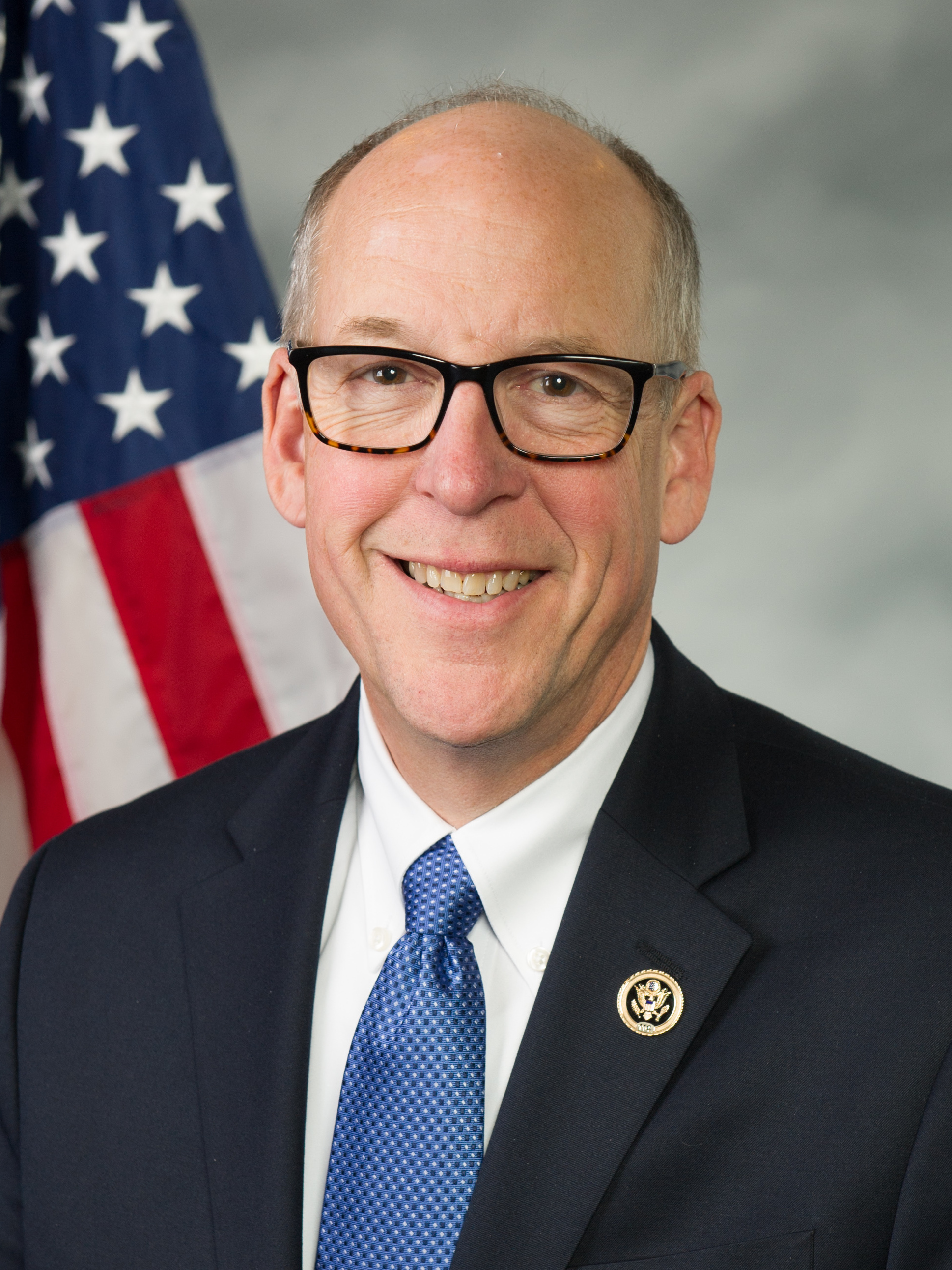

Nominee	Greg Walden	Jim Crary
Party	Republican	Democratic
Alliance	Independent Party
Popular vote	272,952	106,640
Percentage	71.7%	28.0%
- Precinct results Walden: 50–60% 60–70% 70–80% 80–90% >90% Crary: 50–60% 60–70% 70–80% Tie: 50% No votes
U.S. Representative before election
Greg Walden
Republican
Elected U.S. Representative
Greg Walden
Republican

The 2nd district is located east of the Willamette Valley and covers roughly two-thirds of the state. It is the largest of Oregon's five districts and is the seventh-largest district in the nation. Incumbent Republican Greg Walden, who had represented the district since 1999, ran for re-election. He was re-elected with 70% of the vote in 2014. The district had a PVI of R+10.

=== Republican primary ===
==== Candidates ====
===== Nominee =====
- Greg Walden, incumbent U.S. Representative (R–Hood River)

===== Eliminated in primary =====
- Paul J. Romero, refrigeration repair technician and U.S. Navy veteran

==== Results ====
Republican primary results
Party	Candidate	Votes	%
Republican	Greg Walden (incumbent)	85,039	80.0
Republican	Paul J. Romero Jr.	21,099	19.8
Republican	Write-ins	238	0.2
Total votes		106,376	100.0

=== Democratic primary ===
==== Candidates ====
===== Nominee =====
- Jim Crary, retired lawyer

==== Results ====
Democratic primary results
Party	Candidate	Votes	%
Democratic	James "Jim" Crary	53,484	97.6
Democratic	Write-ins	1,295	2.4
Total votes		54,779	100.0

=== Independent Party primary ===
==== Results ====
Independent primary results
Party	Candidate	Votes	%
Independent Party	Greg Walden (incumbent) (write-in)	1,725	61.3
Independent Party	Write-ins	1,090	38.7
Total votes		2,815	100.0

=== General election ===
==== Predictions ====
Source	Ranking	As of
The Cook Political Report	Safe R	November 7, 2016
Daily Kos Elections	Safe R	November 7, 2016
Rothenberg	Safe R	November 3, 2016
Sabato's Crystal Ball	Safe R	November 7, 2016
RCP	Safe R	October 31, 2016

==== Results ====
Oregon's 2nd congressional district, 2016
Party	Candidate	Votes	%
Republican	Greg Walden (incumbent)	272,952	71.7
Democratic	James "Jim" Crary	106,640	28.0
Write-in		1,147	0.3
Total votes		380,739	100.0
Republican hold			

== District 3 ==
2016 Oregon's 3rd congressional district election
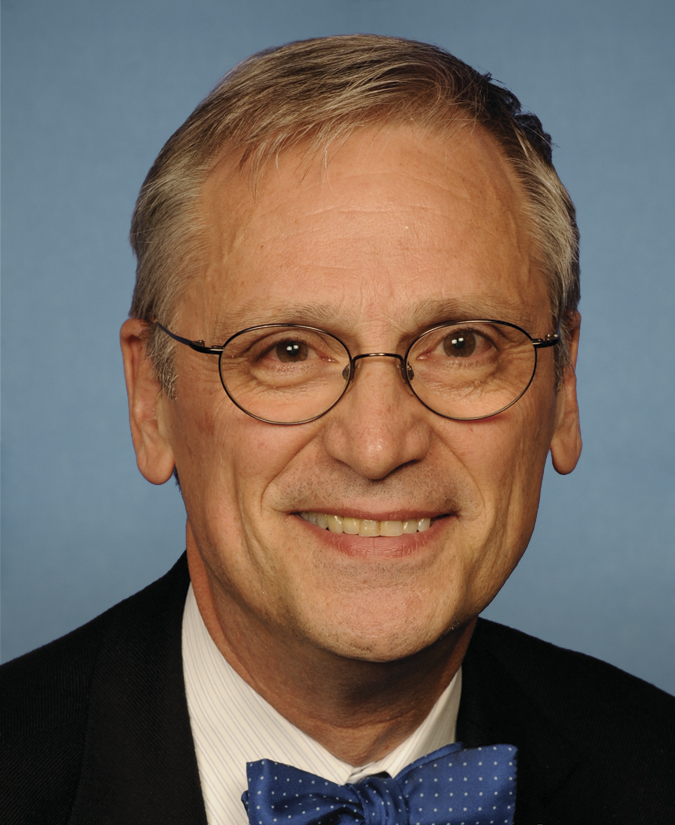

Nominee	Earl Blumenauer	David Walker	David Delk
Party	Democratic	Independent Party	Progressive
Alliance		Republican
Popular vote	274,687	78,154	27,978
Percentage	71.8%	20.5%	7.3%
- Precinct results Blumenauer: 40–50% 50–60% 60–70% 70–80% 80–90% >90% Walker: 40–50% 50–60% 70–80% No votes
U.S. Representative before election
Earl Blumenauer
Democratic
Elected U.S. Representative
Earl Blumenauer
Democratic

The 3rd district most of Multnomah County, including Portland east of the Willamette River, Gresham and Troutdale. Incumbent Democrat Earl Blumenauer, who had represented the district since 1996, ran for re-election. He was re-elected with 72% of the vote in 2014 and the district had a PVI of D+22.

=== Democratic primary ===
==== Candidates ====
===== Nominee =====
- Earl Blumenauer, incumbent U.S. Representative (D–Portland)

==== Results ====
Democratic primary results
Party	Candidate	Votes	%
Democratic	Earl Blumenauer (incumbent)	144,706	98.3
Democratic	Write-ins	2,511	1.7
Total votes		147,217	100.0

=== Republican primary ===
==== Candidates ====
- No declared candidates

==== Results ====
Republican primary results
Party	Candidate	Votes	%
Republican	David W. Walker (write-in)	217	9.1
Republican	Write-ins	2,160	90.9
Total votes		2,377	100.0

=== Candidates ===
- David W. Walker, nurse practitioner

==== Results ====
Independent primary results
Party	Candidate	Votes	%
Independent Party	David W. Walker	2,529	74.7
Independent Party	Write-ins	856	25.3
Total votes		3,385	100.0

=== Progressive primary ===
==== Candidates ====
===== Nominee =====
- David Delk

=== General election ===
==== Predictions ====
Source	Ranking	As of
The Cook Political Report	Safe D	November 7, 2016
Daily Kos Elections	Safe D	November 7, 2016
Rothenberg	Safe D	November 3, 2016
Sabato's Crystal Ball	Safe D	November 7, 2016
RCP	Safe D	October 31, 2016

==== Results ====
Oregon's 3rd congressional district, 2016
Party	Candidate	Votes	%
Democratic	Earl Blumenauer (incumbent)	274,687	71.8
Independent Party	David W. Walker	78,154	20.5
Progressive	David Delk	27,978	7.3
Write-in		1,536	0.4
Total votes		382,355	100.0
Democratic hold			

== District 4 ==
2016 Oregon's 4th congressional district election
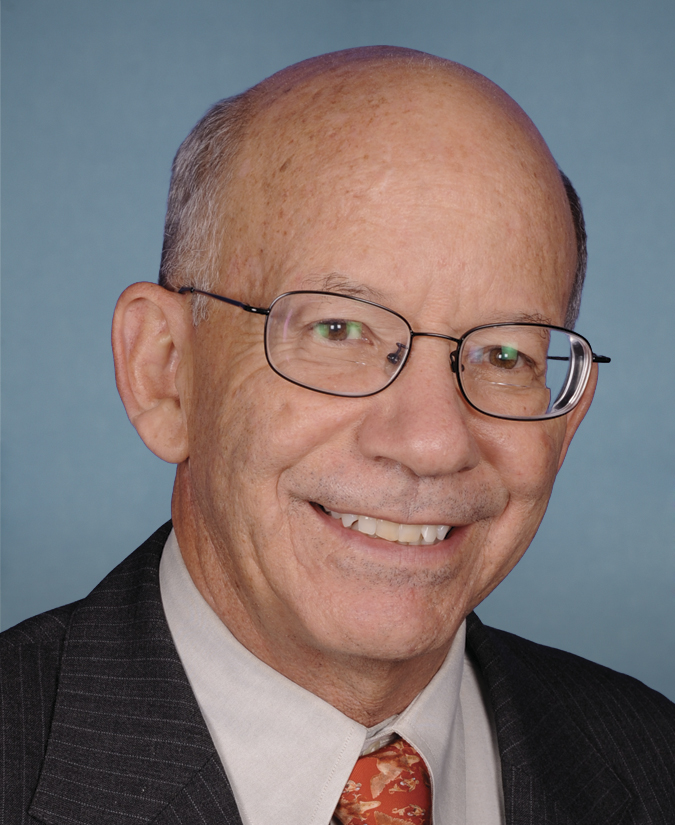

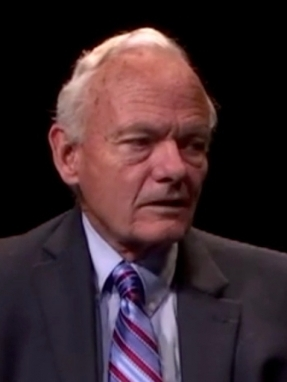
Nominee	Peter DeFazio	Art Robinson
Party	Democratic	Republican
Alliance	Independent Party
Popular vote	220,628	157,743
Percentage	55.5%	39.7%
- Precinct results DeFazio: 40–50% 50–60% 60–70% 70–80% 80–90% Robinson: 40–50% 50–60% 60–70% 70–80% Tie: 40–50% No votes
U.S. Representative before election
Peter DeFazio
Democratic
Elected U.S. Representative
Peter DeFazio
Democratic

The 4th district the southern half of Oregon's coastal counties, including Coos, Curry, Douglas, Lane and Linn counties and most of Benton and Josephine counties. Incumbent Democrat Peter DeFazio, who had represented the district since 1987, ran for re-election. He was re-elected with 59% of the vote in 2014 and the district had a PVI of D+2.

=== Democratic primary ===
==== Candidates ====
===== Nominee =====
- Peter DeFazio, incumbent U.S. Representative (D–Springfield)

===== Eliminated in primary =====
- Joseph McKinney, businessman

==== Results ====
Democratic primary results
Party	Candidate	Votes	%
Democratic	Peter DeFazio (incumbent)	113,816	91.6
Democratic	Joseph McKinney	9,894	8.0
Democratic	Write-ins	601	0.4
Total votes		124,311	100.0

=== Republican primary ===
==== Candidates ====
===== Nominee =====
- Art Robinson, chemist, former chair of the Oregon Republican Party and nominee for this seat in 2010, 2012 & 2014

===== Eliminated in primary =====
- Jo Rae Perkins, former chair of the Linn County Republican Party, candidate for Mayor of Albany in 2010 and candidate for the U.S. Senate in 2014

==== Results ====
Republican primary results
Party	Candidate	Votes	%
Republican	Art Robinson	55,557	67.3
Republican	Jo Rae Perkins	26,375	31.9
Republican	Write-ins	620	0.8
Total votes		82,552	100.0

=== Independent Party primary ===
==== Results ====
Independent primary results
Party	Candidate	Votes	%
Independent Party	Peter DeFazio (incumbent) (write-in)	1,223	42.5
Independent Party	Write-ins	1,654	57.5
Total votes		2,877	100.0

=== Green primary ===
==== Candidates ====
===== Nominee =====
- Mike Beilstein, nominee for this seat in 2008, 2010, and 2014

=== Libertarian primary ===
==== Candidates ====
===== Nominee =====
- Gil Guthrie

=== General election ===
==== Predictions ====
Source	Ranking	As of
The Cook Political Report	Safe D	November 7, 2016
Daily Kos Elections	Safe D	November 7, 2016
Rothenberg	Safe D	November 3, 2016
Sabato's Crystal Ball	Safe D	November 7, 2016
RCP	Safe D	October 31, 2016

==== Results ====
Oregon's 4th congressional district, 2016
Party	Candidate	Votes	%
Democratic	Peter DeFazio (incumbent)	220,628	55.5
Republican	Art Robinson	157,743	39.7
Pacific Green	Mike Beilstein	12,194	3.1
Libertarian	Gil Guthrie	6,527	1.6
Write-in		476	0.1
Total votes		397,568	100.0
Democratic hold			

== District 5 ==
2016 Oregon's 5th congressional district election
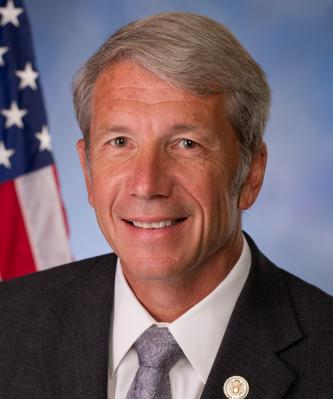

Nominee	Kurt Schrader	Colm Willis
Party	Democratic	Republican
Alliance	Independent Party
Popular vote	199,505	160,443
Percentage	53.5%	43.0%
- Precinct results Schrader: 40–50% 50–60% 60–70% 70–80% 80–90% Willis: 40–50% 50–60% 60–70% 70–80% >90% Tie: 40–50% 50% No votes
U.S. Representative before election
Kurt Schrader
Democratic
Elected U.S. Representative
Kurt Schrader
Democratic

The 5th district includes Oregon's central coast through Salem, north to the southern Portland suburbs and east to the summit of Mount Hood. Incumbent Democrat Kurt Schrader, who had represented the district since 2009, ran for re-election. He was re-elected with 54% of the vote in 2014 and the district had an even PVI.

=== Democratic primary ===
==== Candidates ====
===== Nominee =====
- Kurt Schrader, incumbent U.S. Representative (D–Canby)

===== Eliminated in primary =====
- Dave McTeague, former state representative (1985–95)

==== Results ====
Democratic primary results
Party	Candidate	Votes	%
Democratic	Kurt Schrader (incumbent)	72,634	71.7
Democratic	Dave McTeague	28,184	27.8
Democratic	Write-ins	549	0.5
Total votes		101,367	100.0

=== Republican primary ===
==== Candidates ====
===== Nominee =====
- Colm Willis, lawyer and former political director of Oregon Right to Life

===== Eliminated in primary =====
- Seth Allan, mental health associate
- Earl D. Rainey, truck driver
- Ben West, activist

==== Results ====
Republican primary results
Party	Candidate	Votes	%
Republican	Colm Willis	40,568	57.6
Republican	Ben West	14,696	20.8
Republican	Seth Allan	10,779	15.3
Republican	Earl D. Rainey	3,783	5.4
Republican	Write-ins	665	0.9
Total votes		70,492	100.0

=== Independent Party primary ===
==== Results ====
Independent primary results
Party	Candidate	Votes	%
Independent Party	Kurt Schrader (incumbent) (write-in)	792	33.1
Independent Party	Write-ins	1,601	66.9
Total votes		2,393	100.0

=== Green primary ===
==== Candidates ====
===== Nominee =====
- Marvin Sandnes, Independent Party candidate for the U.S. Senate in 2016

=== General election ===
==== Predictions ====
Source	Ranking	As of
The Cook Political Report	Safe D	November 7, 2016
Daily Kos Elections	Safe D	November 7, 2016
Rothenberg	Safe D	November 3, 2016
Sabato's Crystal Ball	Safe D	November 7, 2016
RCP	Safe D	October 31, 2016

==== Results ====
Oregon's 5th congressional district, 2016
Party	Candidate	Votes	%
Democratic	Kurt Schrader (incumbent)	199,505	53.5
Republican	Colm Willis	160,443	43.0
Pacific Green	Marvin Sandnes	12,542	3.3
Write-in		618	0.2
Total votes		373,108	100.0
Democratic hold			
