= Jeff Merkley =

American politician (born 1956)

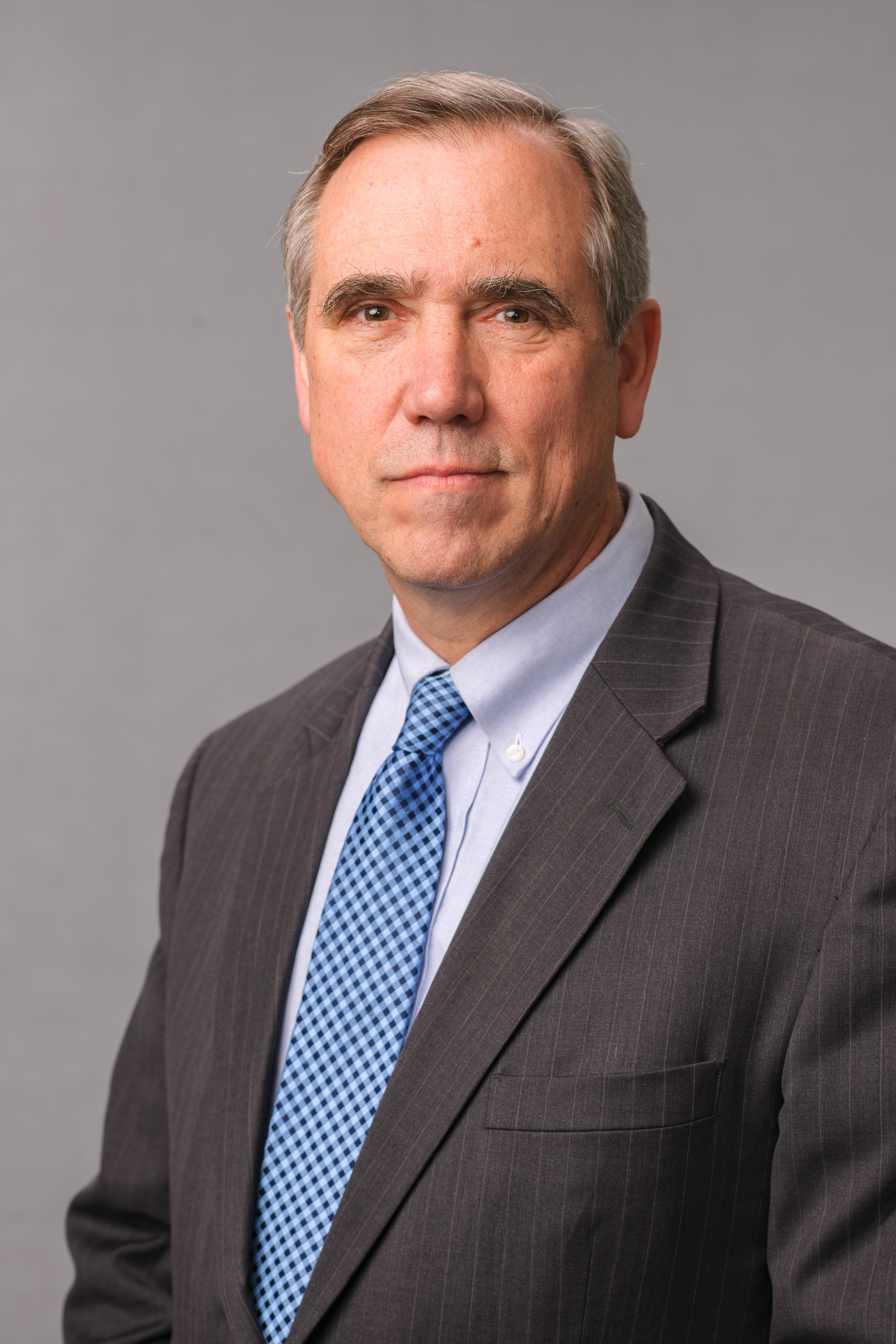
- Official portrait, 2017

Ranking Member of the Senate Budget Committee
- Incumbent
- Assumed office January 3, 2025
- Preceded by: Chuck Grassley

United States Senator from Oregon
- Incumbent
- Assumed office January 3, 2009 Serving with Ron Wyden
- Preceded by: Gordon H. Smith

64th Speaker of the Oregon House of Representatives
- In office January 3, 2007 – January 2, 2009
- Preceded by: Karen Minnis
- Succeeded by: Dave Hunt

Member of the Oregon House of Representatives from the 47th district
- In office January 3, 1999 – January 2, 2009
- Preceded by: Frank Shields
- Succeeded by: Jefferson Smith

Personal details
- Born: Jeffrey Alan Merkley; October 24, 1956 (age 70) Myrtle Creek, Oregon, U.S.
- Party: Democratic
- Spouse: Mary Sorteberg (m. 1992)
- Children: 2
- Education: Stanford University (BA); Princeton University (MPA)
- Website: Senate website Campaign website
- Merkley's voice Merkley on the Good Samaritan Remediation of Abandoned Hardrock Mines Act of 2022; Recorded September 29, 2022

Jeffrey Alan Merkley (born October 24, 1956) is an American politician who is the junior United States senator from Oregon. He was first elected to the Senate in 2008. A member of the Democratic Party, he served from 1999 to 2009 as the representative for the 47th district in the Oregon House of Representatives, which covers central Multnomah County, including portions of eastern Portland; he was the speaker of the Oregon House of Representatives during the last two years of his tenure.

Merkley defeated two-term Republican incumbent U.S. senator Gordon Smith in 2008 and was reelected in 2014, 2020, and 2026, defeating Republican nominees Monica Wehby, Jo Rae Perkins, and David Brock Smith, respectively. During his tenure, Merkley has been an advocate of progressivism and was the only U.S. senator to endorse Bernie Sanders in the 2016 Democratic presidential primaries. Considered a potential candidate for president in 2020, he chose instead to run for reelection to the Senate.

== Early life, education, and early career ==
Jeffrey Alan Merkley was born on October 24, 1956, the son of Darrell Philip Merkley and his wife Betty Lou (Collins). He attended first grade in Roseburg, Oregon, before moving to Portland with his family.

He graduated from David Douglas High School, received a Bachelor of Arts degree in international relations from Stanford University in 1979, and earned a Master of Public Affairs degree from the Woodrow Wilson School at Princeton University in 1982.

After completing his master's degree, Merkley was selected as a Presidential Management Fellow, working at the Office of the Secretary of Defense on the security of American military technology. After his fellowship, he worked in the Congressional Budget Office, where he analyzed nuclear weapons policies and programs.

In 1991 Merkley returned to Portland, where he served as executive director of Portland Habitat for Humanity until 1994.

Merkley started the Walk for Humanity, initiated the Journey for Mankind, launched development of the Habitat Home Building Center, and initiated a pilot project for "YouthBuild" in which gang-affected youth built homes in their own neighborhoods. He also served as Director of Housing Development at Human Solutions, where he worked to make available affordable housing complexes and launched Oregon's first Individual Development Account (IDA) program, which helps low-income families save money to buy homes, attend college, or start businesses.

Merkley was president of the World Affairs Council of Oregon for seven years and continued to serve on the board of trustees.

== Oregon legislature ==
In 1998 Merkley was elected as a Democrat to the Oregon House of Representatives from the 16th district in east Portland (renumbered as the 47th district after the 2002 redistricting). He succeeded Frank Shields, who moved from the House to the Oregon State Senate due to term limits. In its endorsement, The Oregonian predicted that Merkley was the most likely of several Democrats to "accomplish something positive in the Legislature." Following the 2003 session, he was elected Democratic leader, and after the House Democrats gained a majority in the 2006 Oregon statewide elections, they unanimously elected him Speaker of the House in the 74th Oregon Legislative Assembly.

During Merkley's tenure as Speaker, the Oregon House passed numerous major pieces of legislation: It created a state "rainy day fund" (a savings account to protect public schools against the effects of any future fluctuating economy); increased Oregon public school funding by 14 percent ($1 billion) and state university funding by 18 percent ($1.4 billion); banned junk food in schools; expanded the Oregon commercial indoor smoking ban; revised the Oregon Bottle Bill; outlawed discrimination by sexual orientation and gender identity in housing and in the workplace; and gave same-sex couples rights, immunities, and benefits.

== U.S. Senate ==
=== 2008 election ===
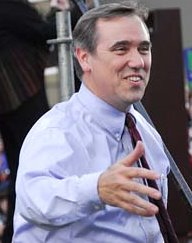
Merkley campaigning for the Senate

On August 1, 2007, Merkley announced he would run for the U.S. Senate in the 2008 election. On August 13, he was endorsed by Governor Ted Kulongoski and former governor Barbara Roberts. In December 2007 he was endorsed by the Oregon AFL–CIO, the state's largest labor federation. The union federation's leaders cited Merkley's 97% record of voting in the interests of working families and his electability in a general election against the incumbent, Gordon Smith. Merkley was the first federal candidate to be cross-nominated by the Independent Party of Oregon.

Merkley won the Democratic nomination to challenge Smith in 2008, narrowly defeating activist Steve Novick and four others in the Democratic primary. He was initially thought to have only a moderate chance of unseating Smith, but a July 2008 Rasmussen poll showed him in the lead, albeit within the margin of error. By August, after strongly negative campaigning on both sides, Rasmussen reported that Merkley's support had deteriorated, with Smith taking a strong lead in the polls. Merkley's favorable rating was at 42%, while his unfavorable rating had risen to 45%.

Polls taken shortly before the election indicated that Merkley's standing had once again improved, with Merkley's 12-point deficit turning into a slight lead.

On election night the race was too close to call, but media outlets including The Oregonian called it for Merkley on the morning of November 6, and Smith conceded later that morning. Ultimately, Merkley defeated Smith by three percentage points, 49% to 46%. While he carried only eight counties, one of them was his home county of Multnomah County, which he won by 142,000 votes—a deficit that proved too much for Smith to overcome. Merkley thus became the first person to unseat an incumbent Oregon senator since Bob Packwood defeated Wayne Morse in 1968.

Merkley formally resigned his seat in the Oregon House in a letter to Secretary of State Bill Bradbury on January 2, 2009. He was sworn in as a senator on January 3, 2009. Upon his swearing in, Oregon was represented in the Senate by two Democrats (Merkley and Ron Wyden) for the first time since Maurine Brown Neuberger served alongside Morse from 1960 to 1967.

=== Tenure ===
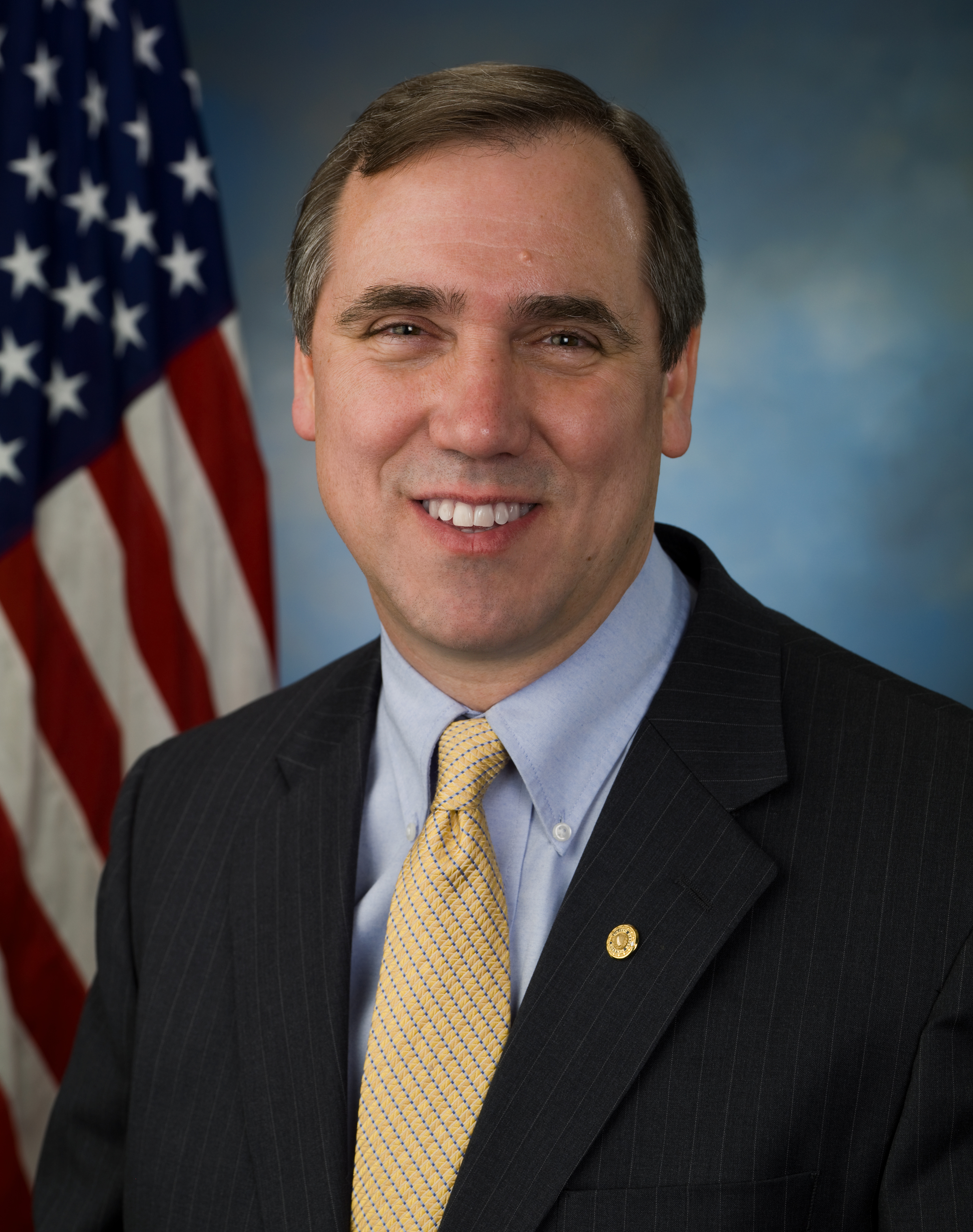
Merkley's first official Congressional photo (111th Congress)

Merkley has a progressive record as a senator. He became the first Democratic member of the Senate to announce that he would vote against the confirmation of Federal Reserve Chairman Ben Bernanke, citing Bernanke's failure to "recognize or remedy the factors that paved the road to this dark and difficult recession". As a member of the Senate Banking Committee, Merkley became a leading force in the effort to pass the Wall Street reform bill. Along with Michigan Senator Carl Levin, he successfully added an amendment, usually called the Volcker Rule, to the Dodd–Frank Wall Street reform bill, which banned high-risk trading inside commercial banking and lending institutions. Merkley also championed an amendment that banned liar loans, a predatory mortgage practice that played a role in the housing bubble and subsequent financial collapse. Merkley is a member of the Fight Club in the U.S. Senate.

He was a founding signatory of a mid-February 2010 petition to use reconciliation to pass legislation providing for a government-run health insurance program. Merkley also championed legislation to give new mothers private space and flexible break times to pump breast milk once they return to work. His breastfeeding amendment was included in the health care reform law and signed into law by President Obama in 2010.

In late February 2010, Merkley again made headlines when he unsuccessfully tried to persuade Republican colleague Jim Bunning of Kentucky to drop his objection to passing a 30-day extension of unemployment benefits for jobless Americans. Bunning replied, "Tough shit." A spokesman for Merkley said that Merkley did not hear Bunning's remark at the time.

In late 2010, Merkley began circulating a proposal about the need to filibuster in order to block legislation. In 2011, he introduced a bill to reform the filibuster. He was joined by Senators Tom Udall of New Mexico and Tom Harkin of Iowa.

Merkley was the only member of the Senate to endorse Bernie Sanders in his 2016 bid for the Democratic nomination for president.

On April 4, 2017, Merkley held the Senate floor for 15 hours and 28 minutes in protest of the confirmation of Neil Gorsuch to the Supreme Court.

In June 2018, Merkley received national attention when he attempted to visit a facility holding the children of jailed adults who had attempted to cross the border to seek asylum. Children were separated from their parents and placed in the custody of the Office of Refugee Resettlement. Merkley filmed his attempt to visit a facility in a former Walmart in Brownsville, Texas. He was denied entrance and the police were called and arrived as he continued to try to speak with the facility administrator. He commented in the film: "I think it's unacceptable that a member of Congress is not being admitted to see what is happening to children whose families are applying for asylum. I decided to come out here, go up to the door and ask to be let in." By midday the video had garnered more than one million viewers.

Merkley again held the Senate floor for an extended period (22 hours and 36 minutes) on October 21–22, 2025, as he spoke against what he called Donald Trump's "authoritarianism" and "tyranny". The speech surpassed fellow Oregon Senator Wayne Morse's record from 1953 and was the fourth-longest in Senate history.

In November 2026, Jeff Merkley stated that he would like senator Chris Van Hollen to be the Senate Majority Leader.

=== Committee assignments ===
- Committee on Appropriations
  - Subcommittee on Agriculture, Rural Development, Food and Drug Administration, and Related Agencies
  - Subcommittee on Commerce, Justice, Science, and Related Agencies
  - Subcommittee on Energy and Water Development
  - Subcommittee on Interior, Environment, and Related Agencies (Ranking Member)
  - Subcommittee on Labor, Health and Human Services, Education, and Related Agencies
  - Subcommittee on State, Foreign Operations, and Related Programs
- Committee on the Budget
- Committee on Environment and Public Works
  - Subcommittee on Clean Air, Climate, and Nuclear Innovation and Safety
  - Subcommittee on Chemical Safety, Waste Management, Environmental Justice and Regulatory Oversight (Ranking Member)
  - Subcommittee on Transportation and Infrastructure
- Committee on Foreign Relations
  - Subcommittee on Africa and Global Health Policy
  - Subcommittee on East Asia, The Pacific, and International Cybersecurity Policy
  - Subcommittee on Western Hemisphere, Transnational Crime, Civilian Security, Democracy, Human Rights, and Global Women's Issues
- Committee on Rules and Administration

=== Caucus memberships ===
- Senate Taiwan Caucus
- Rare Disease Caucus

== Political positions ==
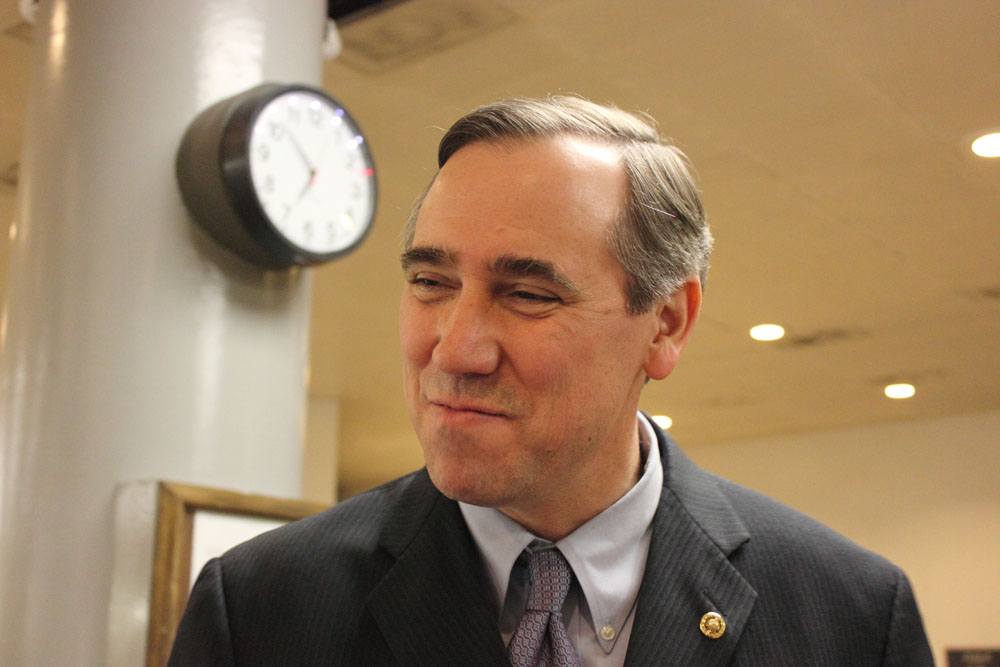
Senator Merkley in 2011

=== Asylum and immigration ===
Merkley has been noted for his opposition to the Trump administration's immigration policies. In June 2018, he attempted to enter the Casa Padre processing facility in Brownsville, Texas, where children separated from their parents were being detained as a result of the Trump administration's "zero tolerance" policy. Merkley was not permitted to enter, and eventually the police were called and he was asked to leave the premises. Video of the event went viral on social media, drawing greater attention to the policy in traditional media and among the public. Speaking about the policy in an interview with Time, Merkley said, "Part of this is the dehumanization of people seeking asylum in the U.S." By the end of June, Trump signed an executive order modifying the policy to replace family separation with family detention. Merkley continued to oppose the administration's policy, dubbing it "handcuffs for all". As of July 2018, many children who were separated under the policy still had not been reunited with their parents.

In August 2018, Merkley was one of 17 senators to sign a letter spearheaded by Kamala Harris to Secretary of Homeland Security Kirstjen Nielsen demanding that the Trump administration take immediate action to reunite 539 migrant children with their families, citing each passing day of inaction as intensifying "trauma that this administration has needlessly caused for children and their families seeking humanitarian protection".

In November 2018, Merkley was one of 11 senators to sign a letter to Secretary of Defense James Mattis about "the overt politicization of the military" with the Trump administration's deployment of 5,800 troops to the U.S.-Mexico border and requesting a briefing and written justification from the U.S. Northern Command for troop deployment, urging Mattis to "curb the unprecedented escalation of DOD involvement in immigration enforcement".

In January 2019, Merkley was one of 20 senators to sponsor the Dreamer Confidentiality Act, a bill imposing a ban on the Department of Homeland Security (DHS) from passing information collected on DACA recipients to Immigration and Customs Enforcement (ICE), Customs and Border Protection (CBP), the Department of Justice, or any other law enforcement agency except in cases of fraudulent claims, national security issues, or non-immigration-related felonies.

=== Electronic cigarettes ===
In April 2019, Merkley was one of 11 senators to sign a letter to Juul CEO Kevin Burns asserting that the company had "lost what little remaining credibility the company had when it claimed to care about the public health" and that they would not rest until Juul's "dangerous products are out of the hands of our nation's children". The senators requested Juul list each of its advertising buys and detail the steps it has taken to ensure its advertisements are not seen by people under 21 and asked whether Juul had purchased any social media influencers for product promotion.

=== Defense and foreign policy ===
In August 2013, Merkley was one of 23 Democratic senators to sign a letter to the Department of Defense warning that some payday lenders were "offering predatory loan products to service members at exorbitant triple digit effective interest rates and loan products that do not include the additional protections envisioned by the law" and asserting that service members, along with their families, "deserve the strongest possible protections and swift action to ensure that all forms of credit offered to members of our armed forces are safe and sound".

On June 28, 2018, Merkley was the only member of the Senate Appropriations Committee to vote against the $675 billion Pentagon spending bill for fiscal 2019 providing $607.1 billion for its base budget and $67.9 billion for the Overseas Contingency Operation (OCO) war fund. The bill was a $20.4 billion increase over the fiscal 2018 level.

==== Afghanistan ====
In November 2011, Merkley led an effort to urge President Obama to expedite transition of responsibility for military and security operations to the government of Afghanistan. The Senate passed an amendment to the defense authorization bill by voice vote that required Obama to deliver to Congress a timeline for an accelerated transition of all military and security operations to the Afghan government within 90 days of the law's enactment. Co-sponsors included Republicans Mike Lee of Utah and Rand Paul of Kentucky.

==== Central America ====
In April 2019, Merkley was one of 34 senators to sign a letter to President Trump encouraging him "to listen to members of your own Administration and reverse a decision that will damage our national security and aggravate conditions inside Central America", asserting that Trump had "consistently expressed a flawed understanding of U.S. foreign assistance" since becoming president and that he was "personally undermining efforts to promote U.S. national security and economic prosperity" by preventing the use of Fiscal Year 2018 national security funding. The senators argued that foreign assistance to Central American countries created less migration to the U.S. by helping to improve conditions there.

==== Iraq war ====
Merkley supports the Reid-Feingold Amendment, a plan for removing troops from Iraq, and has his own five-point plan for stability in Iraq:

- Removing all combat troops starting right away and completing the redeployment in six to 12 months
- Eliminating permanent U.S. military bases in Iraq
- Engaging Iraq's neighbors in a diplomatic effort to secure the peace, particularly Turkey, Iran, and Syria
- Removing all American contractors from the country and replacing them with Iraqi contractors
- Directing our attention toward stronger engagement with the Iraqi Parliament and Courts

In March 2008, Merkley endorsed the Responsible Plan to End the War In Iraq.

==== Russia ====
In December 2010, Merkley voted for the ratification of New Start, a nuclear arms reduction treaty between the U.S. and the Russian Federation obliging both countries to have no more than 1,550 strategic warheads and 700 launchers deployed during the next seven years and to continue on-site inspections that halted when START I expired the previous year. It was the first arms treaty with Russia in eight years.

In February 2017, Merkley was one of 11 senators to sign a letter to U.S. Attorney General Jeff Sessions expressing their concern "about credible allegations that the Trump campaign, transition team, and Administration has colluded with the Russian government, including most recently the events leading to the resignation of Lieutenant General Michael Flynn as National Security Adviser". The senators requested the creation of "an independent Special Counsel to investigate collusion with the Russian government by General Flynn and other Trump campaign, transition and Administrative officials" in order to maintain "the confidence, credibility and impartiality of the Department of Justice".

In December 2018, after U.S. Secretary of State Mike Pompeo announced the Trump administration was suspending its obligations in the Intermediate-Range Nuclear Forces Treaty in 60 days in the event that Russia continued to violate the treaty, Merkley was one of 26 senators to sign a letter expressing concern that the administration was "now abandoning generations of bipartisan U.S. leadership around the paired goals of reducing the global role and number of nuclear weapons and ensuring strategic stability with America's nuclear-armed adversaries" and calling on Trump to continue arms negotiations.

==== Israel–Palestine ====
In April 2019, after the Trump administration refused to distribute money to West Bank and Gaza "because of perceived intransigence on peace talks by the Palestinians and payments to the families of those who have attacked Israelis", Merkley was one of six Democratic senators to introduce a resolution restoring U.S. humanitarian aid to Palestinians in the West Bank and Gaza.

In 2023, during the Gaza war, Merkley was one of three U.S. senators who called for a ceasefire, along with Dick Durbin and Peter Welch. In January 2024, Merkley voted for a resolution proposed by Bernie Sanders to apply the human rights provisions of the Foreign Assistance Act to U.S. aid to Israel's military. The proposal was defeated, 72 to 11. In November 2024, Merkley was one of 19 senators to vote to block the U.S.'s arms sales to Israel. In April 2025, Merkley voted for a pair of resolutions Sanders proposed to cancel the Trump administration's sales of $8.8 billion in bombs and other munitions to Israel. The proposals were defeated, 82 to 15.

==== Saudi Arabia ====
In June 2017, Merkley voted for a resolution by Rand Paul and Chris Murphy that would block Trump's $510 million sale of precision-guided munitions to Saudi Arabia that made up a portion of the $110 billion arms sale Trump announced during his visit to Saudi Arabia the previous year.

In March 2018, Merkley voted against tabling a resolution spearheaded by Bernie Sanders, Chris Murphy, and Mike Lee that would have required Trump to withdraw American troops either in or influencing Yemen within the next 30 days unless they were combating Al-Qaeda.

In October 2018, Merkley was one of seven senators to sign a letter to Secretary of State Mike Pompeo saying that they found it "difficult to reconcile known facts with at least two" of the Trump administration's certifications that Saudi Arabia and the United Arab Emirates were attempting to protect Yemeni civilians and were in compliance with US laws on arms sales, citing their lack of understanding of "a certification that the Saudi and Emirati governments are complying with applicable agreements and laws regulating defense articles when the [memo] explicitly states that, in certain instances, they have not done so".

==== Venezuela ====
On February 28, 2019, Merkley introduced a resolution prohibiting American military intervention in Venezuela without Congress's approval, adding that it was "critical that the Venezuelan people are the ones to determine their own future, and that the U.S. does not repeat a failed strategy of military intervention in Latin America". He called Venezuelan President Nicolás Maduro "a brutal dictator and incompetent leader" and called for him to resign while new elections are held under an interim government.

==== Hong Kong ====
On October 27, 2022, Merkley and Representative Jim McGovern urged U.S. financial executives to cancel their attendance at the Global Financial Leaders' Investment Summit, saying, "Their presence only serves to legitimize the swift dismantling of Hong Kong's autonomy, free press, and the rule of law by Hong Kong authorities acting along with the Chinese Communist Party."

=== Banking regulation ===
Merkley has focused on Wall Street reform in his position on the Senate Banking Committee. He and Carl Levin led an effort to crack down on proprietary trading at depository banks and other critical financial firms. The Dodd–Frank Wall Street Reform and Consumer Protection Act included the Merkley–Levin amendment to implement the Volcker Rule. The rule is premised on the notion that banks should not make risky, speculative bets while enjoying government deposit insurance. It is intended to prevent high-risk trading that jeopardizes the banking system. A $2 billion trading loss at JPMorgan Chase & Co. in May 2012 prompted Merkley and Levin to push regulators to stiffen their draft language on the Volcker Rule provisions.

=== Infrastructure ===
In January 2018, Merkley was one of 10 senators to sign a letter to Trump encouraging him "to not only protect existing 'Buy America' laws, but to work with Congress to expand these protections and address coverage gaps" while the administration's infrastructure proposal was being drafted, and asserting that "no infrastructure proposal should allow circumvention of current requirements in federal law that ensure our public infrastructure is built with American-made iron, steel, and manufactured materials by workers who are paid a fair wage."

In June 2019, Merkley was one of eight senators to sponsor the Made in America Act, legislation that would designate federal programs that had funded infrastructure projects not currently subject to Buy America standards and mandate that materials used in these programs be domestically produced. Bill cosponsor Tammy Baldwin said the bill would strengthen Buy America requirements and that she was hopeful both Democrats and Republicans would support "this effort to make sure our government is buying American products and supporting American workers".

=== Health care ===
Merkley voted for the Patient Protection and Affordable Care Act (also known as Obamacare). He was a founding signatory of a mid-February 2010 petition to use reconciliation to pass legislation providing for a government-run health insurance program. Merkley also championed legislation that gives nursing mothers flexible break times and private space to pump breast milk at work. His breastfeeding amendment was included in the health care reform law and signed into law by Obama in 2010.

In December 2016, Merkley was one of five senators to vote against the Obama administration-supported 21st Century Cures Act, legislation increasing funding for disease research while addressing flaws in the American mental health systems and altering drugs and medical devices' regulatory system."

In December 2018, Merkley was one of 42 senators to sign a letter to Trump administration officials Alex Azar, Seema Verma, and Steve Mnuchin arguing that the administration was improperly using Section 1332 of the Affordable Care Act to authorize states to "increase health care costs for millions of consumers while weakening protections for individuals with preexisting conditions." The senators requested the administration withdraw the policy and "re-engage with stakeholders, states, and Congress."

In February 2019, Merkley was one of 23 Democratic senators to introduce the State Public Option Act, a bill that would authorize states to form a Medicaid buy-in program for all residents and thereby let all residents of the state buy into a state-driven Medicaid health insurance plan if they wished. Brian Schatz, a bill cosponsor, said the legislation would "unlock each state's Medicaid program to anyone who wants it, giving people a high-quality, low-cost public health insurance option" and that its goal was "to make sure that every single American has comprehensive health care coverage."

In June 2019, Merkley was one of 15 senators to introduce the Affordable Medications Act, legislation intended to promote transparency by mandating that pharmaceutical companies disclose the amount of money going toward research and development in addition to both marketing and executives' salaries. The bill also abolished the restriction preventing the federal Medicare program from using its buying power to negotiate lower drug prices for beneficiaries and hinder drug company monopoly practices used to keep prices high and disable less expensive generics entering the market.

In August 2019, Merkley was one of 19 senators to sign a letter to Treasury Secretary Steve Mnuchin and Health and Human Services Secretary Alex Azar requesting data from the Trump administration in order to help states and Congress understand the potential consequences of the Texas v. United States Affordable Care Act lawsuit, writing that an overhaul of the present health care system would form "an enormous hole in the pocketbooks of the people we serve as well as wreck state budgets".

=== Housing ===
As a member of the Senate Banking, Housing, and Urban Affairs Committee, Merkley has contributed legislation toward fixing the subprime mortgage crisis. The Dodd–Frank Wall Street Reform and Consumer Protection Act contained an amendment by Merkley and Senator Amy Klobuchar protecting consumers from deceptive mortgage lending practices. The amendment prohibits mortgage lenders from receiving hidden payments when they sell high-cost loans and prohibits brokers from receiving higher pay for selling riskier or higher-fee loans. It also bolsters underwriting standards.

To speed the recovery of the housing market, Merkley supports aggressive efforts to create refinancing alternatives to costly and time-consuming foreclosures, including allowing federal bankruptcy judges to modify existing mortgages so they can keep their home under new terms. In July 2012, Merkley proposed a broad new refinancing plan for homeowners who owe more than their houses are worth and therefore cannot refinance. Under his plan, any homeowner who is current on their mortgage could refinance into a 4% mortgage for 15 years or a 5% mortgage for 30 years.

In April 2019, Merkley was one of 41 senators to sign a bipartisan letter to the housing subcommittee praising the Housing and Urban Development Department's Section 4 Capacity Building program as authorizing "HUD to partner with national nonprofit community development organizations to provide education, training, and financial support to local community development corporations (CDCs) across the country" and expressing disappointment that Trump's budget "has slated this program for elimination after decades of successful economic and community development." The senators wrote that they hoped the subcommittee would support continued funding for Section 4 in Fiscal Year 2020.

In December 2023, Merkley introduced the End Hedge Fund Control of American Homes Act of 2023 to the Senate. This legislation would require hedge funds to sell at least 10% of the single-family homes they own each year over a 10-year period. After this period, hedge funds will be banned from owning any single-family homes.

=== Environment ===
==== Climate change ====
In October 2017, Merkley was one of 19 senators to sign a letter to EPA Administrator Scott Pruitt questioning Pruitt's decision to repeal the Clean Power Plan, asserting that the repeal's proposal used "mathematical sleights of hand to over-state the costs of industry compliance with the 2015 Rule and understate the benefits that will be lost if the 2017 repeal is finalized" and would fail to "satisfy the requirements of the law, nor will it slow the increase in frequency and intensity of extreme weather events, the inexorable rise in sea levels, or the other dire effects of global warming that our planet is already experiencing."

In September 2018, Merkley was one of eight senators to sponsor the Climate Risk Disclosure Act, a bill cosponsor Elizabeth Warren said used "market forces to speed up the transition from fossil fuels to cleaner energy—reducing the odds of an environmental and financial disaster without spending a dime of taxpayer money."

In November 2018, Merkley was one of 25 Democratic senators to cosponsor a resolution specifying key findings of the Intergovernmental Panel On Climate Change report and National Climate Assessment. The resolution affirmed the senators' acceptance of the findings and support for bold action to address climate change.

In March 2019, Merkley was one of 11 senators to sponsor the Climate Security Act of 2019, legislation forming a new group within the State Department that would develop strategies to integrate climate science and data into national security operations and restore the post of special envoy for the Arctic, which Trump eliminated in 2017. The envoy would advise the president and the administration on the potential effects of climate on national security and be responsible for facilitating all interagency communication between federal science and security agencies.

Merkley was a member of the Senate Democrats' Special Committee on the Climate Crisis, which published a report of its findings in August 2020.

==== Energy ====
Merkley has consistently supported policies that promote American energy independence and investment in alternative energy sources. In 2010, he and Senators Tom Carper, Tom Udall, and Michael Bennet introduced the Oil Independence for a Stronger America Act, which set a goal to achieve complete independence from overseas oil by 2030. The same senators put forward a similar piece of legislation again in 2011. Merkley supports increasing national fuel economy standards, and advocates for a 6 to 7 percent annual improvement for vehicles over current mileage standards. He has also been a strong supporter of electric vehicles. In 2011, Merkley and Senator Lamar Alexander introduced the Promoting Electric Vehicles Act, a bill designed to provide short-term incentives for the rapid development and production of electric vehicles.

In March 2019, Merkley was an original cosponsor of a bipartisan bill intended to mandate that the Environmental Protection Agency declare per- and polyfluoroalkyl substances hazardous substances that can be addressed with cleanup funds via the EPA Superfund law and require that polluters undertake or pay for remediation within a year of the bill's enaction.

=== Campaign finance ===
Merkley supports increased transparency in campaign financing and limits on independent political spending by corporations. He has been critical of both the 2010 Supreme Court case Citizens United v. Federal Election Commission and of the court's decision in 2012 not to revisit this case. Merkley called the 2012 decision "disturbing and damaging." In response to the decision, in July 2012 Merkley and six other senators sponsored the Disclose Act. Among other provisions, the legislation would require public disclosure of political donors that give $10,000 or more.

=== Senate reform ===
Merkley has been a leader in trying to reform the rules of the Senate, including those about the filibuster. On January 5, 2011, he and Senators Tom Udall and Tom Harkin introduced a resolution intended to increase debate and accountability in the Senate. The resolution proposed to eliminate the filibuster on motions to proceed, eliminate secret holds, guarantee consideration of amendments for both majority and minority, require a "talking filibuster" in which senators opposed to holding a straight up-or-down vote must continuously debate on the Senate floor, and expedite the nominations process. Upon introducing the resolution, Merkley said: "The Senate is broken. We are failing to fulfill our legislative responsibilities." On January 27, his "talking filibuster" proposal received 46 Senate votes.

=== Supreme Court ===
Merkley voted to confirm Justices Sonia Sotomayor and Elena Kagan.

In April 2017, Merkley filibustered in protest of Neil Gorsuch's nomination for 15 hours. "This is a stolen seat", he said, referring to Senate Republicans' blocking President Obama's nomination of Merrick Garland. "This is the first time in American history that one party has blockaded a nominee for almost a year in order to deliver a seat to a president of their own party."

Merkley voted not to confirm Justice Brett Kavanaugh or Amy Coney Barrett. He voted to confirm Justice Ketanji Brown Jackson.

=== Postal reform ===
During the Postal Reform Act debate in the Senate in April 2012, Merkley led the effort to pass an amendment that would impose a one-year moratorium on the closure of most rural post offices. After that, the bill would prohibit the closure of post offices more than 10 miles from another post office and impose conditions limiting the closure of others. Twenty rural post offices in Oregon face closure because of the postal service's financial problems.

=== Social issues ===
Senator Merkley's video contribution to the It Gets Better Project

Merkley supports same-sex marriage and introduced the Employment Non-Discrimination Act (ENDA) in the Senate during the 111th Congress as S. 1584. BlueOregon, a progressive Oregon blog, commented on Merkley's suitability to be lead sponsor of ENDA, noting that as Speaker of the Oregon House of Representatives he had successfully guided Oregon's state version of ENDA, the Oregon Equality Act, to become law.

In 2010, Merkley cosponsored legislation to repeal Don't Ask Don't Tell (DADT) and allow gay Americans to serve openly in the military. In March 2011, he cosponsored the Respect for Marriage Act (RFMA) to repeal the Defense of Marriage Act (DOMA), legislation that would bar the federal government from recognizing same-sex marriages. With 11 other RFMA cosponsors, including fellow Oregon Senator Ron Wyden, Merkley released a video as part of the It Gets Better Project, the anti-bullying initiative aimed at inspiring at-risk LGBTQIA+ youth.

In May 2014, days before the FCC was scheduled to rewrite its net neutrality rules, Merkley was one of 11 senators to sign a letter to FCC Chairman Tom Wheeler charging that Wheeler's proposal would destroy net neutrality and urging the FCC to "consider reclassifying Internet providers to make them more like traditional phone companies, over which the agency has clear authority to regulate more broadly."

In October 2018, Merkley was one of 20 senators to sign a letter to Secretary of State Mike Pompeo urging him to reverse the rolling back of a policy that granted visas to same-sex partners of LGBTQIA+ diplomats who had unions that were not recognized by their home countries, writing that too many places around the world have seen LGBTQIA+ people "subjected to discrimination and unspeakable violence, and receive little or no protection from the law or local authorities" and that refusing to let LGBTQIA+ diplomats bring their partners to the U.S. would be equivalent to upholding "the discriminatory policies of many countries around the world."

In December 2018, Merkley voted for the First Step Act, legislation aimed at reducing recidivism rates among federal prisoners by expanding job training and other programs in addition to forming an expansion of early-release programs and modifications on sentencing laws such as mandatory minimum sentences for nonviolent drug offenders, "to more equitably punish drug offenders."

In June 2019, Merkley was one of 18 senators to sign a letter to Pompeo requesting an explanation of a State Department decision not to issue a statement that year commemorating Pride Month or issue the annual cable outlining activities for embassies commemorating Pride Month. They also asked why the LGBTQIA+ special envoy position had remained vacant and asserted that "preventing the official flying of rainbow flags and limiting public messages celebrating Pride Month signals to the international community that the United States is abandoning the advancement of LGBTQIA+ rights as a foreign policy priority."

==== Agriculture ====
In March 2019, Merkley was one of 38 senators to sign a letter to Secretary of Agriculture Sonny Perdue warning that dairy farmers "have continued to face market instability and are struggling to survive the fourth year of sustained low prices" and urging his department to "strongly encourage these farmers to consider the Dairy Margin Coverage program."

In June 2019, Merkley was one of 19 Democratic senators to send a letter to USDA Inspector General (IG) Phyllis K. Fong requesting that she investigate USDA instances of retaliation and political decision-making and asserting that not to conduct an investigation would mean these "actions could be perceived as a part of this administration's broader pattern of not only discounting the value of federal employees, but suppressing, undermining, discounting, and wholesale ignoring scientific data produced by their own qualified scientists."

In July 2019, Merkley was one of eight senators to introduce the Agricultural Trucking Relief Act, a bill that would alter the definition of an agricultural commodity to include both horticultural and aquacultural products and promote a larger consistency in regulation in both federal and state agencies as part of an attempt to ease regulatory burdens on trucking and the agri-community. He said the bill "is a necessary step forward in clarifying trucking rules, to make sure businesses in every sector of Oregon's agriculture industry have the same ability to deliver their products while they're still fresh."

==== Child care ====
In 2019, Merkley was one of 35 senators who introduced the Child Care for Working Families Act, a bill that would create 770,000 new child care jobs and ensured that families making less than 75% of the state median income did not pay for child care, with higher-earning families having to pay "their fair share for care on a sliding scale, regardless of the number of children they have." The legislation also supported universal access to high-quality preschool programs for all 3- and 4-year-olds and changed child care workforce compensation and training to aid both teachers and caregivers.

==== Drug policy ====
In July 2015, Merkley was one of eight senators to sign a letter to U.S. Chamber of Commerce President Thomas J. Donohue requesting the chamber stop lobbying against anti-smoking regulations on the grounds that "its international clout to fight so ardently against regulations of dangerous tobacco products is contrary to United States foreign policy and global health goals."

In December 2016, Merkley was one of 17 senators to sign a letter to Trump asking him to fulfill a campaign pledge to bring down the cost of prescription drugs, stating their willingness "to advance measures to achieve this goal", and calling on Trump "to partner with Republicans and Democrats alike to take meaningful steps to address the high cost of prescription drugs through bold administrative and legislative actions."

In December 2018, Merkley was one of 21 senators to sign a letter to Food and Drugs Commissioner Scott Gottlieb stating their approval of the actions of the Food and Drugs Administration to hinder youth access to e-cigarettes and urging the FDA "to take additional, stronger steps to prevent and reduce e-cigarette use among youth."

==== Gun control ====
In January 2019, Merkley was one of 40 senators who introduced the Background Check Expansion Act, a bill that would require background checks for the sale or transfer of all firearms including all unlicensed sellers. Exceptions to the bill's background check requirement included transfers between members of law enforcement, loaning firearms for either hunting or sporting events on a temporary basis, giving firearms to members of one's immediate family, transferring them as part of an inheritance, or giving a firearm to another person temporarily for immediate self-defense.

In February 2019, Merkley was one of 38 senators to sign a letter to Senate Judiciary Committee Chairman Lindsey Graham calling on him to hold a hearing on universal background checks and noting Graham's statement to the press that he "intended to have the Committee work on 'red flag' legislation and potentially also background checks, both actions" the senators supported.

==== Lifeline ====
In March 2018, Merkley spearheaded a letter signed by nine other senators lambasting a proposal from FCC Chairman Ajit Pai that would curb the scope of benefits from the Lifeline program during a period when roughly 6.5 million people in poor communities relied on Lifeline for access to high-speed internet, arguing that it was Pai's "obligation to the American public, as the Chairman of the Federal Communications Commission, to improve the Lifeline program and ensure that more Americans can afford access, and have means of access, to broadband and phone service." The senators also advocated insuring "Lifeline reaches more Americans in need of access to communication services."

== Personal life ==
Merkley has competed in and finished Ironman Triathlons. He has said his workouts help him manage the stress of his job.

Merkley drives a Chevy Bolt and is one of seven U.S. senators known to drive an electric vehicle.

== Electoral history ==
Oregon House of Representatives 47th district election, 2004
Party	Candidate	Votes	%
Democratic	Jeff Merkley (incumbent)	14,670	64.11%
Republican	Frank Cleys	8,023	35.06%
	Write-ins	188	0.82%

Oregon House of Representatives 47th district election, 2006
Party	Candidate	Votes	%	±%
Democratic	Jeff Merkley (incumbent)	11,106	63.96%	−0.15%
Republican	Bruce McCain	6,192	35.66%	+0.60%
	Write-ins	65	0.37%	−0.45%

U.S. Senate Democratic primary election in Oregon, 2008
Party	Candidate	Votes	%
Democratic	Jeff Merkley	246,482	45.10%
Democratic	Steve Novick	230,889	42.24%
Democratic	Candy Neville	38,367	7.02%
Democratic	Roger Obrist	12,647	2.31%
Democratic	Pavel Goberman	12,056	2.21%
Democratic	David Loera	6,127	1.12%

U.S. Senate election in Oregon, 2008
Party	Candidate	Votes	%	±%
Democratic	Jeff Merkley	864,392	48.90%	+9.29%
Republican	Gordon H. Smith (incumbent)	805,159	45.55%	−10.66%
Constitution	Dave Brownlow	92,565	5.24%	+3.53%
	Write-ins	5,388	0.30%	+0.19%
Democratic gain from Republican		Swing		

2014 U.S. Senate Democratic primary election in Oregon
Party	Candidate	Votes	%	±%
Democratic	Jeff Merkley (incumbent)	277,120	93.34%	+48.24%
Democratic	William Bryk	11,330	3.82%	
Democratic	Pavel Goberman	8,436	2.84%	

2014 U.S. Senate election in Oregon
Party	Candidate	Votes	%	±%
Democratic	Jeff Merkley (incumbent)	814,537	57.50%	+8.60%
Republican	Monica Wehby	538,847	36.87%	−8.68%
Libertarian	Mike Montchalin	44,916	3.07%	N/A
Pacific Green	Christina Jean Lugo	32,434	2.22%	N/A
Constitution	James Leuenberger	24,212	1.66%	−3.58%
	Write-ins	6,672	0.46%	+0.16%
Total votes		1,461,618	100.0%	
Democratic hold				

2020 U.S. Senate election in Oregon
Party	Candidate	Votes	%	±%
Democratic	Jeff Merkley (incumbent)	1,321,047	56.91%	+1.18%
Republican	Jo Rae Perkins	912,814	39.32%	+2.45%
Libertarian	Gary Dye	42,747	1.84%	−1.23%
Pacific Green	Ibrahim Taher	42,239	1.82%	−0.40%
Write-in		2,402	0.11%	−0.34%
Total votes		2,321,249	100.0%	
Democratic hold				

Oregon House of Representatives
Preceded by Deborah Kafoury	Minority Leader of the Oregon House of Representatives; 2003–2007	Succeeded by Wayne Scott
Political offices
Preceded by Karen Minnis	Speaker of the Oregon House of Representatives; 2007–2009	Succeeded by Dave Hunt
Party political offices
Preceded by Bill Bradbury	Democratic nominee for U.S. Senator from Oregon (Class 2); 2008, 2014, 2020, 2026	Most recent
Preceded by Barbara Boxer	Senate Democratic Chief Deputy Whip; 2017–2025; Served alongside: Cory Booker (2017–2021), Brian Schatz (2017–2023)	Succeeded by Brian Schatz
U.S. Senate
Preceded by Gordon Smith	U.S. Senator (Class 2) from Oregon; 2009–present Served alongside: Ron Wyden	Incumbent
Preceded by Jim McGovern	Chair of the Joint China Commission; 2021–2023	Succeeded by Chris Smith
Preceded by Chuck Grassley	Ranking Member of the Senate Budget Committee; 2025–present	Incumbent
U.S. order of precedence (ceremonial)
Preceded by Mark Warner	Order of precedence of the United States as United States Senator	Succeeded by Jim Risch
Preceded by Jim Risch	United States senators by seniority 22nd	Succeeded by Michael Bennet
