= Monica Wehby =

American physician and politician

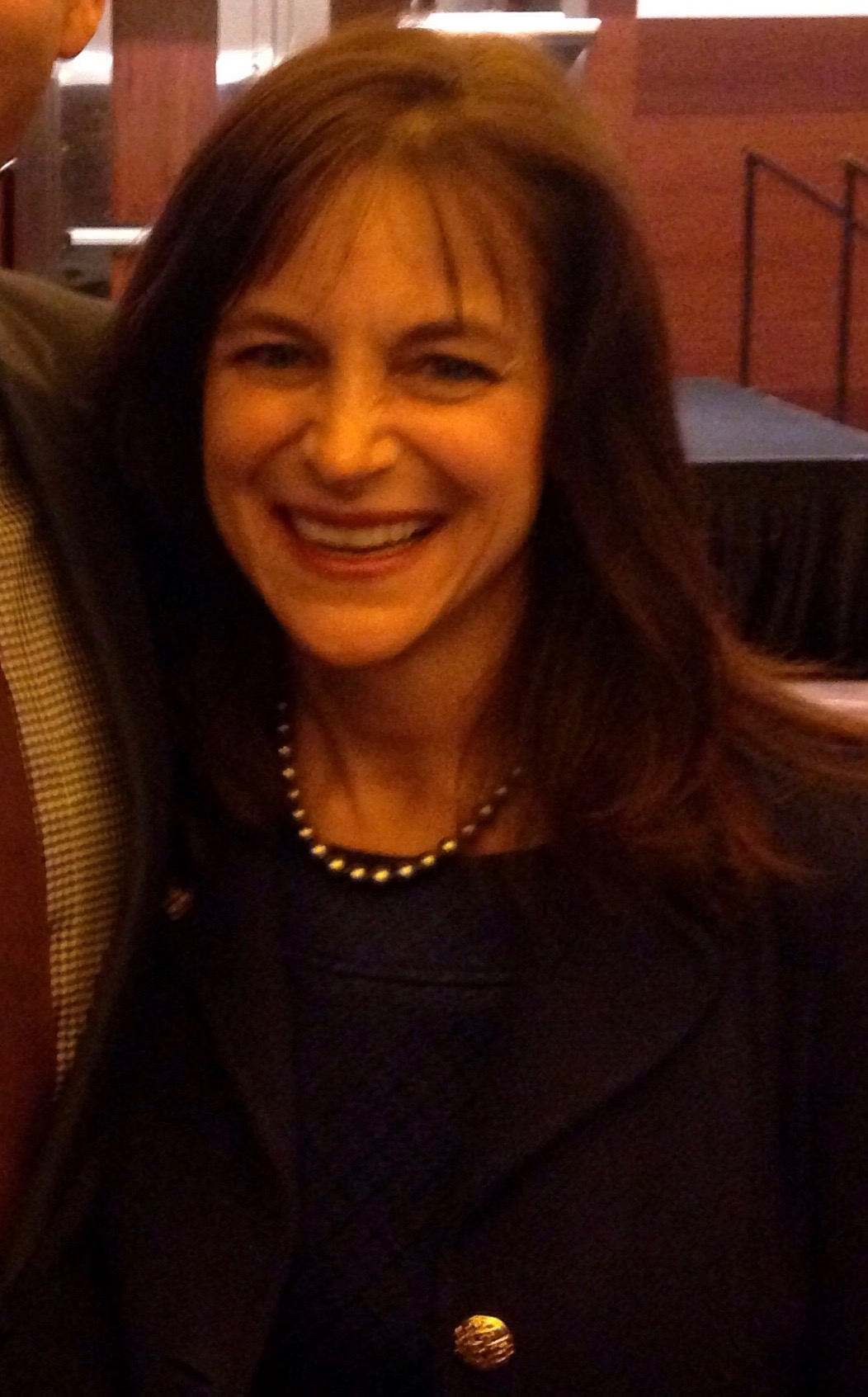

Personal details
- Born: May 7, 1962 (age 64) Nashville, Tennessee, U.S.
- Party: Republican
- Spouse: Jim Grant (d. 2007)
- Children: 4
- Education: University of Notre Dame (BS); Baylor College of Medicine (MD)
- Website: Campaign website

Monica Wehby (/ˈwɛbiː/ WEB-ee; born May 7, 1962) is an American physician and politician from the state of Oregon. She was the Republican nominee for the United States Senate from Oregon in the 2014 election against Democratic incumbent Jeff Merkley.

== Early life and education ==
Wehby was born in Nashville, Tennessee. Her father was a Certified Public Accountant, and her mother was a registered nurse. Her grandfather immigrated from Lebanon.

Raised a Catholic, she graduated from Father Ryan High School in 1979 and went on to earn a BS in Microbiology and a BA in Psychology from the University of Notre Dame.

Wehby graduated from Baylor College of Medicine in Houston, Texas, where she served as student body president, senior class president, and chair of the medical student section of the Texas Medical Association. She completed a neurosurgery residency at UCLA Medical School in 1995 and a fellowship in pediatric neurosurgery at the University of Utah School of Medicine in 1997. In 1998, she moved to Portland, Oregon, where she became director of pediatric neurosurgery at Randall Children's Hospital at Legacy Emanuel.

== Early political career ==
In 2004, Wehby led an unsuccessful statewide campaign for Ballot Measure 35, which would have tightened Oregon's medical malpractice regulations, limiting damages recovered for patient injuries caused by a healthcare provider's negligence or recklessness. The measure failed by 896,857 votes (50.02%) to 896,054 (49.98%).

In 2007, she was elected president of the Oregon Medical Association and in 2009, she appeared in nationwide television advertisements warning about possible problems with the Patient Protection and Affordable Care Act (also known as Obamacare). In 2011, she was elected to the board of trustees of the American Medical Association.

== 2014 U.S. Senate election ==
=== Declaration and early developments ===
In October 2013, Wehby announced that she would seek the Republican nomination for the United States Senate seat held by first-term Democratic incumbent Jeff Merkley. She said that "I want our kids to have the same opportunities that we had. I'm really concerned when I look at the way things are going we may be the first generation that can't say that their kids are going to be better off." In the primary election, she faced information technology consultant Mark Callahan, State Representative Jason Conger, attorney Tim Crawley and former chairwoman of the Linn County Republican Party and nominee for Mayor of Albany in 2010 Jo Rae Perkins.

Much of her campaign focused on criticism of the Affordable Care Act and Merkley's support for it, with her slogan of "Keep Your Doctor, Change Your Senator". She also criticized primary opponent Jason Conger for voting to set up a state-run insurance exchange. Instead, she proposed allowing people to "purchase an insurance plan with pretax dollars" and "buy insurance across state lines" as well as expanding health savings accounts and letting people have catastrophic coverage.

=== "Trust" advertisement and national attention ===
In late April, Wehby released an advertisement that received significant attention. Called "Trust", the minute-long ad was narrated by a former patient of Wehby's, who was advised to terminate her pregnancy after an ultrasound discovered a congenital disorder with her unborn daughter's spinal cord. However, Wehby successfully performed surgery after the patient's daughter was born and she survived. The ad was widely praised and drew national attention to her campaign and to the Oregon Republican primary. As Republicans were hoping to retake control of the Senate in the 2014 elections, it was hoped that Wehby's profile as a successful surgeon and moderate Republican, combined with Merkley's middling popularity and the disastrous rollout of Cover Oregon, the state's Affordable Care Act insurance exchange website, would result in Oregon coming into play as a competitive race.

While Wehby drew the support of the Republican establishment and the National Republican Senatorial Committee and endorsements from national politicians such as Newt Gingrich, Mitch McConnell and Mitt Romney, she received criticism from conservatives for her moderate political positions on issues such as immigration, abortion and same-sex marriage. She was also criticised by primary opponent Jason Conger for her support of the Healthy Americans Act, co-sponsored by Oregon's other U.S. Senator, Democrat Ron Wyden, and Utah Republican Bob Bennett, which Conger said was "90 percent there with Obamacare" because it contained provisions that people purchase government-approved insurance plans. Wehby responded that it was "a good plan; it was a market-based approach" and said that she never supported the entire bill and did not think uninsured people should be mandated or enticed into buying health insurance. The battle between the more centrist, establishment-supported Wehby and the more conservative, grass-roots-supported Conger was seen as symptomatic of a Republican Party that had failed to win a statewide election in Oregon since then-U.S. Senator Gordon H. Smith was re-elected in 2002.

=== Increasing scrutiny ===
In early May, a poll released by the conservative polling organization Vox Populi Polling showed Wehby leading Merkley by 45% to 41%. However, her candidacy also began to receive greater scrutiny. After an interview with the Willamette Week editorial board, the newspaper endorsed Jason Conger for the Republican primary, saying that although they "probably agree on more issues with Wehby than we do with Conger", there was "no contest" when it came to "preparation, knowledge of the issues and an ability to express the results of clear thinking." Wehby was also questioned about her links to businessman Andrew Miller, a major Republican donor, who had contributed heavily to efforts to support her and oppose Jason Conger. When asked if there was any collaboration between her campaign and the PAC financed by Miller, Wehby said that "there is absolutely no coordination between our campaign and the group." The Democratic Party of Oregon filed a complaint to the Federal Election Commission, saying that it was "implausible" to think that Miller would not be privy to private information about her campaign plans and projects.

Later that year, a television ad was released in which the narrator stated that Merkley "voted six times to raise the debt limit." The ad was produced and financed by a group called Freedom Partners Chamber of Commerce; a nonprofit 501(c)(6) organization headquartered in Arlington, Virginia. The organization, which was founded in 2011 under the name Association for American Innovation, was purposed to promote "the benefits of free markets and a free society." It was partially funded by the Koch brothers, and sponsored various Republican politicians and conservative groups. The group was dissolved in 2019 amidst a restructuring of the Koch family's giving. While Wehby welcomed the ad campaign, she also made it clear she didn’t work with the group as doing so would violate federal election law.

=== Primary results ===
The Oregon state primary was set to take place Tuesday May 21 as Wehby faced Representative Jason Conger. Conger had criticized Wehby for being insufficiently conservative and for her lack of political experience. Wehby ran on a platform that focused on introducing legislation that would help Oregonians get back to work and foster small business growth.

Wehby received an endorsement by Ben Carson, retired surgeon, conservative activist and the 17th United States Secretary of Housing and Urban Development. Additionally, Wehby received an endorsement from Newt Gingrich, and former presidential candidate Mitt Romney.

In Oregon, all elections are conducted by postal voting. Ballots for the primary election were mailed to registered Republicans on April 30, with the deadline for returning them May 20. Wehby won the election by 134,627 votes (49.96%) to Conger's 101,401 (37.63%). Information technology consultant and perennial candidate Mark Callahan received 18,220 votes (6.76% of the total). Former chairwoman of the Linn County Republican Party and candidate for Mayor of Albany in 2010 Jo Rae Perkins received 7,602 votes (2.82% of the total) and Tim Crawley received 6,566 votes (2.44%), with 1,027 write-in votes (0.38%).

Conger declined to endorse Wehby immediately after the election results were published, expressing frustration with what he perceived as the NRSC’s preference for her.

In her victory speech, Wehby thanked Republican voters and claimed that "people were tired of the democrat's dirty tricks". She ended the speech by reciting her campaign slogan: "Keep your doctor, change your senator."

=== Post-primary ===
After winning the primary, Wehby largely went to ground for three weeks. On June 10, in her first post-primary appearance, she attended a meet-and-greet with supporters in Oregon City, where she answered questions from reporters. Asked about the allegations of stalking and harassment, Wehby replied: "I think that the thing to learn from that is that I am a person who will stand up for what I believe in. I'm a person who doesn't easily back down. I will fight for Oregonians with very strong conviction. I'm a very committed, determined person."

In July, Wehby's campaign revealed that she had raised over $955,000 in the second fundraising quarter. By contrast, Merkley had raised $1.8 million.

On 6 September, a super PAC affiliated with the Koch brothers announced that it was cancelling all the television ad time that it had reserved in October, totalling almost $1 million, having previously spent heavily on Wehby's behalf. At the same time, a new Rasmussen Reports poll found Wehby trailing Merkley by 48% to 35%, compared to her trailing 47% to 37% in the firm's last poll of the race in May.

In early September, Wehby's campaign aired a campaign ad featuring Ben West, who was one of the plaintiffs in the lawsuit that overturned Oregon's ban on same-sex marriage.

=== Debates ===
In late September, Wehby refused an invitation to participate with Merkley in a televised debate on October 23, which was to be hosted by KGW and The Oregonian. KGW executive news director Rick Jacobs said "I can't recall a major candidate ever refusing our offer to debate" and political scientist Jim Moore said that her refusal to debate "goes against everything we know challengers ought to do -- have as many debates as possible."

Wehby met with Merkley in the only debate of the campaign, hosted by KOBI, on October 14. Both candidates painted the other as extreme and they clashed on issues including the minimum wage, which Merkley supported increasing and Wehby opposed increasing.

=== Positions ===
Wehby describes herself as "personally pro-life," and has taken moderate positions on abortion and same-sex marriage, stating that the federal government should not be involved in those issues.

She is politically pro-choice on the issue of abortion and reproductive issues. She announced her support for same-sex marriage in a campaign ad.

=== Results and analysis ===
Wehby was defeated by Merkley in the general election by a wide margin, receiving 498,191 votes (37.1%) to his 744,516 (55.8%). Political scientist Jim Moore summarised her campaign as "one disaster after another", blaming "very poor campaign management". By contrast, Jeff Mapes of The Oregonian noted that Merkley ran a vigorous and professional campaign.

2014 US Senate election in Oregon
Party	Candidate	Votes	%
Democratic	Jeff Merkley	814,537	55.7
Republican	Monica Wehby	538,847	36.9
Libertarian	Mike Montchalin	44,916	3.1
Pacific Green	Christina Jean Lugo	32,434	2.2
Constitution	James E Leuenberger	24,212	1.7
Write-in		6,672	0.5
Total votes		1,461,618	100%

=== Post-Senate race ===
After losing to Sen. Jeff Merkley in 2014, Wehby stated her desire to remain in politics to "help people feel better represented by their government." In 2015, reports started coming out claiming that she was being courted by both Republican and Democratic leaders to run for governor.

On February 18, 2015, Oregon Governor John Kitzhaber resigned amid a public corruption scandal; Kate Brown succeeded him since the Constitution of Oregon identifies the secretary of state as the successor when the governor leaves office prematurely. Oregon law required a special election in November 2016 for the two years remaining in Kitzhaber's unfinished term as governor. By April 2016 Brown had raised over $800,000 for her campaign in 2016 alone.

By early 2015 Wehby had raised $58,500 for Monica PAC, and she launched a now-defunct website promoting the committee and gauging the general interest of the population.

By late 2015, her PAC had raised more than $300,000 hired an Arizona-based consulting group to help her run her potential campaign. However, as support dwindled towards the end of 2015, The PAC shut down and following weeks of speculation, she put out a statement pulling out of the race and stating that she wanted to focus on her practice as a pediatric neurosurgeon at the Randall Children's Hospital at Legacy Emanuel.

In 2015, Wehby was invited as a panelist to the State of Reform Health Policy Conference at the Hilton Portland. At the conference, she shared her thoughts on health reform, liability, the financial burden on patients and being a politician and a physician.

== Indiana State Medical Association - District 7 Presidential Election ==
In 2024, the Indiana State Medical Association (ISMA) District 7 faced a controversy regarding its leadership elections. Monica Wehby, elected as District 7 President on April 30, was found ineligible due to a bylaw adopted in 2023, requiring candidates to have been regular members for the preceding two years. Upon discovery, District 7 leadership invalidated both the President and Trustee elections, citing concerns about the interconnected nature of the contests. The district leadership announced plans for a special electronic election to fill both positions, with nominations to be open for two weeks, but the final date to be determined. The incident prompted an apology from ISMA staff and a commitment to greater transparency and adherence to bylaws in future electoral processes.

Party political offices
Preceded by Gordon Smith	Republican nominee for U.S. Senator from Oregon (Class 2); 2014	Succeeded by Jo Rae Perkins
