= 2014 United States Senate election in Oregon =

- November 4, 2014
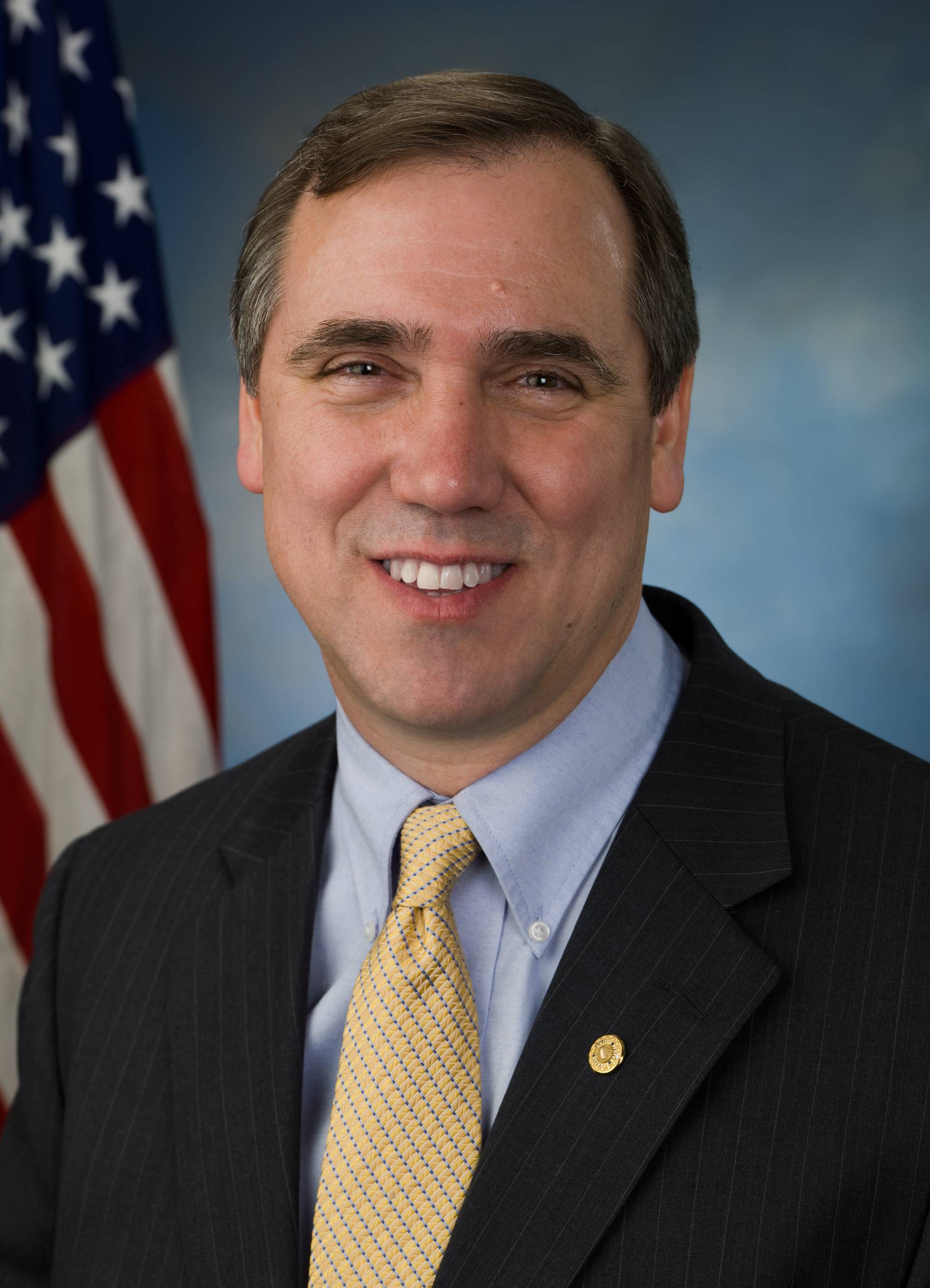

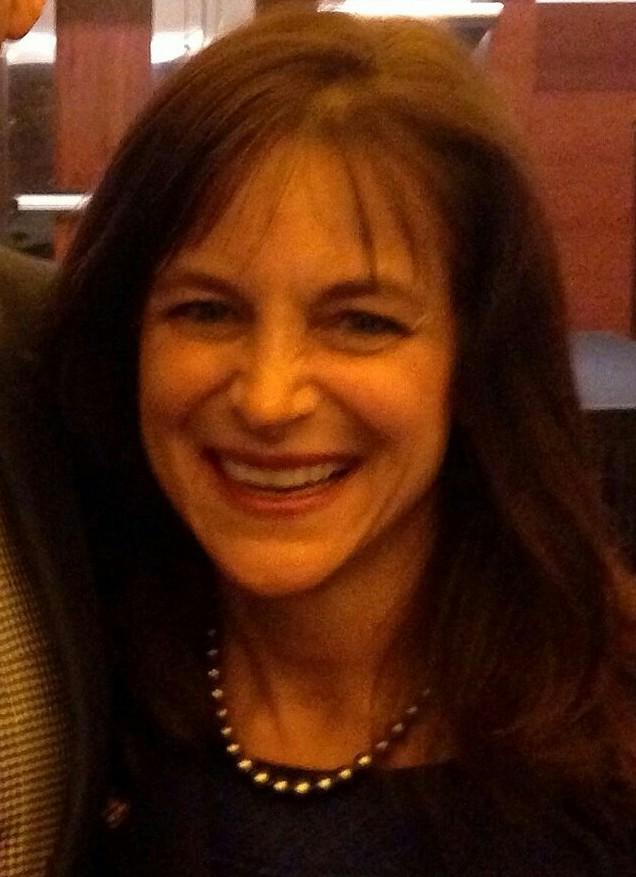
Nominee	Jeff Merkley	Monica Wehby
Party	Democratic	Republican
Popular vote	814,537	538,847
Percentage	55.73%	36.87%
- County results Merkley: 40–50% 50–60% 60–70% 70–80% Wehby: 40–50% 50–60% 60–70%
U.S. senator before election
Jeff Merkley
Democratic
Elected U.S. Senator
Jeff Merkley
Democratic

The 2014 United States Senate election in Oregon took place on November 4, 2014, to elect a member of the United States Senate to represent the State of Oregon, concurrently with the election of the Governor of Oregon, as well as other elections to the United States Senate in other states and elections to the United States House of Representatives and various state and local elections.

Incumbent Democratic Senator Jeff Merkley successfully ran for reelection to a second term. Despite the national midterm climate being a strong one for Republicans, this was actually a stronger Senate election for him in terms of margin of victory, winning by almost 20% and carrying nine additional counties he had lost in 2008. Primary elections were held on May 20, 2014. Merkley easily won the Democratic nomination, while the Republicans nominated pediatric neurosurgeon Monica Wehby. Initially, the race was considered potentially competitive, but Wehby's campaign began to collapse after she faced multiple allegations of stalking and harassment from former partners, and was found to have plagiarized portions of her campaign website.

== Background ==
Democrat Jeff Merkley, the Speaker of the Oregon House of Representatives, had narrowly defeated two-term Republican incumbent Gordon H. Smith with 49% of the vote in 2008.

== Democratic primary ==
=== Candidates ===
==== Declared ====
- William Bryk, attorney from New York and perennial candidate
- Pavel Goberman, fitness instructor and perennial candidate
- Jeff Merkley, incumbent senator

=== Results ===
Democratic primary results
Party	Candidate	Votes	%
Democratic	Jeff Merkley (incumbent)	277,120	92.04%
Democratic	William Bryk	11,330	3.76%
Democratic	Pavel Goberman	8,436	2.81%
	write-ins	4,194	1.39%
Total votes		301,080	100.00%

== Republican primary ==
=== Candidates ===
==== Declared ====
- Mark Callahan, information technology consultant and perennial candidate
- Jason Conger, state representative
- Tim Crawley, attorney
- Jo Rae Perkins, former Chairwoman of the Linn County Republican Party and candidate for Mayor of Albany in 2010
- Monica Wehby, pediatric neurosurgeon

==== Withdrew ====
- Sam Carpenter, businessman

==== Declined ====
- Bruce Hanna, state representative
- Rick Miller, owner and founder of Avamere
- Gordon H. Smith, former U.S. Senator
- Greg Walden, U.S. Representative and Chairman of the National Republican Congressional Committee

=== Endorsements ===
Jason Conger

Individuals

- Rick Santorum, former U.S. Representative and former U.S. Senator (R-PA) and candidate for president in 2012

Organizations

- Oregon Right to Life

Newspapers

- Statesman Journal
- Willamette Week
Monica Wehby

Individuals

- Ben Carson, retired surgeon and conservative activist
- Newt Gingrich, former Speaker of the United States House of Representatives
- Mitt Romney, former governor of Massachusetts and nominee for President in 2012

Newspapers

- The Oregonian

=== Polling ===
Poll source	Date(s) administered	Sample size	Margin of error	Mark Callahan	Jason Conger	Tim Crawley	Jo Rae Perkins	Monica Wehby	Undecided
Benenson Strategy Group	April 14–17, 2014	410	± ?	—	24%	—	—	22%	55%
Wenzel Strategies	May 1–4, 2014	607	± ?	4%	22%	3%	3%	43%	26%
Public Opinion Strategies	May 12–13, 2014	500	± 4.38%	2%	24%	2%	2%	41%	26%

=== Results ===
Results by county: Wehby: 40–50%; 50–60%; 60–70%; Conger: 40–50%; 50–60%; 60–70%

Republican primary results
Party	Candidate	Votes	%
Republican	Monica Wehby	134,627	49.96%
Republican	Jason Conger	101,401	37.63%
Republican	Mark Callahan	18,220	6.76%
Republican	Jo Rae Perkins	7,602	2.82%
Republican	Tim Crawley	6,566	2.44%
Write-in		1,027	0.39%
Total votes		266,438	100.00%

== Independents ==
The filing deadline for independent candidates is August 26, 2014. In order to qualify, a candidate must submit 17,893 signatures of registered voters or obtain signatures from at least 1,000 electors at a valid assembly of electors.

=== Candidates ===
==== Declared ====
- Karl King, massage therapist

== General election ==
=== Debates ===
- Complete video of debate, October 14, 2014

=== Predictions ===
Source	Ranking	As of
The Cook Political Report	Likely D	November 3, 2014
Sabato's Crystal Ball	Likely D	November 3, 2014
Rothenberg Political Report	Likely D	November 3, 2014
Real Clear Politics	Likely D	November 3, 2014

=== Polling ===
Poll source	Date(s) administered	Sample size	Margin of error	Jeff Merkley (D)	Monica Wehby (R)	Other	Undecided
Harper Polling	April 1–2, 2014	670	± 3.91%	46%	34%	—	20%
Benenson Strategy Group	April 14–17, 2014	600	± 4%	52%	32%	—	16%
Rasmussen Reports	May 21–22, 2014	750	± 4%	47%	37%	5%	11%
Public Policy Polling	May 22–27, 2014	956	± 3.2%	50%	36%	—	15%
The Tarrance Group*	June 1–3, 2014	615	± 4.1%	41%	39%	9%	11%
SurveyUSA	June 5–9, 2014	560	± 4.2%	50%	32%	9%	9%
CBS News/NYT/YouGov	July 5–24, 2014	2,088	± 2.6%	53%	39%	1%	7%
SurveyUSA	August 1–5, 2014	564	± 4.2%	52%	33%	7%	9%
Moore Information^	August 5–9, 2014	500	± 4%	47%	38%	—	16%
CBS News/NYT/YouGov	August 18 – September 2, 2014	1,541	± 4%	51%	39%	1%	9%
Rasmussen Reports	September 2–3, 2014	750	± 4%	48%	35%	5%	12%
Polling Company/WomanTrend	September 9–11, 2014	600	± 4%	42%	34%	7%	14%
SurveyUSA	September 22–24, 2014	568	± 4.2%	52%	32%	8%	8%
CBS News/NYT/YouGov	September 20 – October 1, 2014	1,508	± 3%	52%	39%	1%	8%
DHM Research	October 2014	?	± 4.3%	47%	26%	6%	19%
SurveyUSA	October 16–19, 2014	561	± 4.2%	53%	32%	7%	8%
CBS News/NYT/YouGov	October 16–23, 2014	1,421	± 4%	51%	39%	1%	9%
SurveyUSA	October 23–27, 2014	552	± 4.3%	53%	32%	8%	6%
Elway Research	October 26–27, 2014	403	± 5%	49%	30%	3%	18%

- ^ Internal poll for Dennis Richardson campaign
- * Internal poll for Monica Wehby campaign
Hypothetical polling

Poll source	Date(s) administered	Sample size	Margin of error	Jeff Merkley (D)	Allen Alley (R)	Other	Undecided
Public Policy Polling	June 21–24, 2012	686	± 3.7%	43%	37%	—	20%
Public Policy Polling	December 3–5, 2012	614	± 4%	53%	36%	—	12%

Poll source	Date(s) administered	Sample size	Margin of error	Jeff Merkley (D)	Jason Atkinson (R)	Other	Undecided
Public Policy Polling	June 21–24, 2012	686	± 3.7%	43%	34%	—	23%

Poll source	Date(s) administered	Sample size	Margin of error	Jeff Merkley (D)	Jason Conger (R)	Other	Undecided
Harper Polling	April 1–2, 2014	670	± 3.91%	47%	40%	—	12%
Benenson Strategy Group	April 14–17, 2014	600	± 4%	50%	34%	—	16%

Poll source	Date(s) administered	Sample size	Margin of error	Jeff Merkley (D)	Bruce Hanna (R)	Other	Undecided
Public Policy Polling	June 21–24, 2012	686	± 3.7%	43%	35%	—	23%
Public Policy Polling	December 3–5, 2012	614	± 4%	52%	34%	—	14%

Poll source	Date(s) administered	Sample size	Margin of error	Jeff Merkley (D)	Gordon Smith (R)	Other	Undecided
Public Policy Polling	December 3–5, 2012	614	± 4%	47%	43%	—	10%

Poll source	Date(s) administered	Sample size	Margin of error	Jeff Merkley (D)	Bruce Starr (R)	Other	Undecided
Public Policy Polling	December 3–5, 2012	614	± 4%	52%	32%	—	16%

Poll source	Date(s) administered	Sample size	Margin of error	Jeff Merkley (D)	Greg Walden (R)	Other	Undecided
Public Policy Polling	June 21–24, 2012	686	± 3.7%	40%	42%	—	18%
Public Policy Polling	December 3–5, 2012	614	± 4%	47%	42%	—	11%

=== Results ===
United States Senate election in Oregon, 2014
Party	Candidate	Votes	%	±%
Democratic	Jeff Merkley (incumbent)	814,537	55.73%	+6.83%
Republican	Monica Wehby	538,847	36.87%	−8.68%
Libertarian	Mike Monchalin	44,916	3.07%	N/A
Pacific Green	Christina Jean Lugo	32,434	2.22%	N/A
Constitution	James E. Leuenberger	24,212	1.66%	−3.58%
Write-in		6,672	0.45%	N/A
Total votes		1,461,618	100.00%	N/A
Democratic hold				

==== By county ====
County	Jeff Merkley Democratic		Monica Wehby Republican		All others		Margin		Total votes cast
County	#	%	#	%	#	%	#	%	Total votes cast
Baker	2,334	33.0%	4,238	60.0%	491	6.9%	-1,904	-27.0%	7,063
Benton	23,073	62.4%	11,452	31.0%	2,468	6.7%	11,621	31.4%	36,993
Clackamas	79,219	51.4%	64,447	41.8%	7,267	9.8%	14,772	9.6%	154,205
Clatsop	8,148	56.8%	5,143	35.9%	1,047	7.3%	3,005	20.9%	14,338
Columbia	9,957	50.3%	7,879	39.8%	1,953	9.9%	2,078	10.5%	19,789
Coos	11,521	48.5%	10,294	43.4%	1,920	8.1%	1,227	5.1%	23,735
Crook	3,233	36.6%	4,874	55.2%	716	8.1%	-1,641	-18.6%	8,823
Curry	4,371	45.6%	4,470	46.6%	742	7.7%	-99	-1.0%	9,583
Deschutes	34,680	50.6%	29,114	42.5%	4,779	6.9%	5,566	8.1%	68,573
Douglas	16,401	40.1%	21,112	51.7%	3,343	8.2%	-4,711	-11.6%	40,856
Gilliam	366	42.0%	440	50.5%	66	7.6%	-74	-8.5%	872
Grant	1,051	32.8%	1,943	60.6%	213	6.7%	-892	-27.8%	3,207
Harney	911	31.1%	1,784	61.0%	230	7.9%	-873	-29.9%	2,925
Hood River	5,139	62.8%	2,540	31.0%	510	6.3%	2,599	31.8%	8,189
Jackson	40,740	50.0%	34,619	42.5%	6,040	7.5%	6,121	7.5%	81,399
Jefferson	2,809	41.5%	3,440	50.8%	518	7.7%	-631	-9.3%	6,767
Josephine	14,218	42.6%	15,722	47.1%	3,452	10.3%	-1,504	-4.5%	33,392
Klamath	8,150	36.1%	12,522	55.5%	1,898	8.4%	-4,372	-19.4%	22,570
Lake	966	30.7%	1,930	61.4%	246	9.8%	-964	-30.7%	3,142
Lane	89,269	62.2%	44,815	31.2%	9,511	6.6%	44,454	31.0%	143,595
Lincoln	11,484	59.3%	6,360	32.8%	1,523	7.9%	5,124	26.5%	19,367
Linn	18,050	42.3%	20,664	48.5%	3,923	9.2%	-2,614	-6.2%	42,637
Malheur	2,051	27.6%	4,755	64.1%	614	8.3%	-2,704	-36.5%	7,420
Marion	48,581	48.6%	43,917	43.9%	7,543	7.6%	4,664	4.7%	100,041
Morrow	1,119	35.9%	1,722	55.3%	273	8.7%	-603	-19.4%	3,114
Multnomah	216,613	74.6%	53,035	18.3%	20,696	7.2%	162,578	56.3%	290,344
Polk	14,356	48.5%	13,118	44.4%	2,102	7.1%	1,238	4.1%	29,576
Sherman	283	33.1%	523	61.2%	49	5.8%	-240	-28.1%	855
Tillamook	5,463	52.1%	4,187	39.9%	831	7.9%	1,276	12.2%	10,481
Umatilla	6,655	35.6%	10,676	57.1%	1,367	7.3%	-4,021	-21.5%	18,698
Union	3,816	38.0%	5,498	54.7%	732	7.3%	-1,682	-16.7%	10,046
Wallowa	1,215	34.2%	2,140	60.3%	193	5.4%	-925	-26.1%	3,548
Wasco	4,563	50.2%	3,787	41.7%	741	8.1%	776	8.5%	9,091
Washington	106,769	56.2%	69,406	36.5%	13,796	7.3%	37,363	19.7%	189,971
Wheeler	275	40.5%	344	50.7%	60	8.8%	-69	-10.2%	679
Yamhill	16,688	46.7%	15,937	44.6%	3,109	8.7%	751	2.1%	35,734
Totals	814,537	55.7%	538,847	36.9%	108,234	7.4%	275,690	18.8%	1,461,618

Counties that flipped from Republican to Democratic

- Clackamas (largest city: Lake Oswego)
- Coos (largest city: Coos Bay)
- Deschutes (largest city: Bend)
- Jackson (largest city: Medford)
- Marion (largest city: Salem)
- Tillamook (largest city: Tillamook)
- Polk (largest city: Salem)
- Wasco (largest municipality: The Dalles)
- Yamhill (largest city: McMinnville)

== See also ==
- 2014 United States Senate elections
- 2014 United States elections
- 2014 Oregon gubernatorial election
