= 2020 United States Senate election in Oregon =

- November 3, 2020
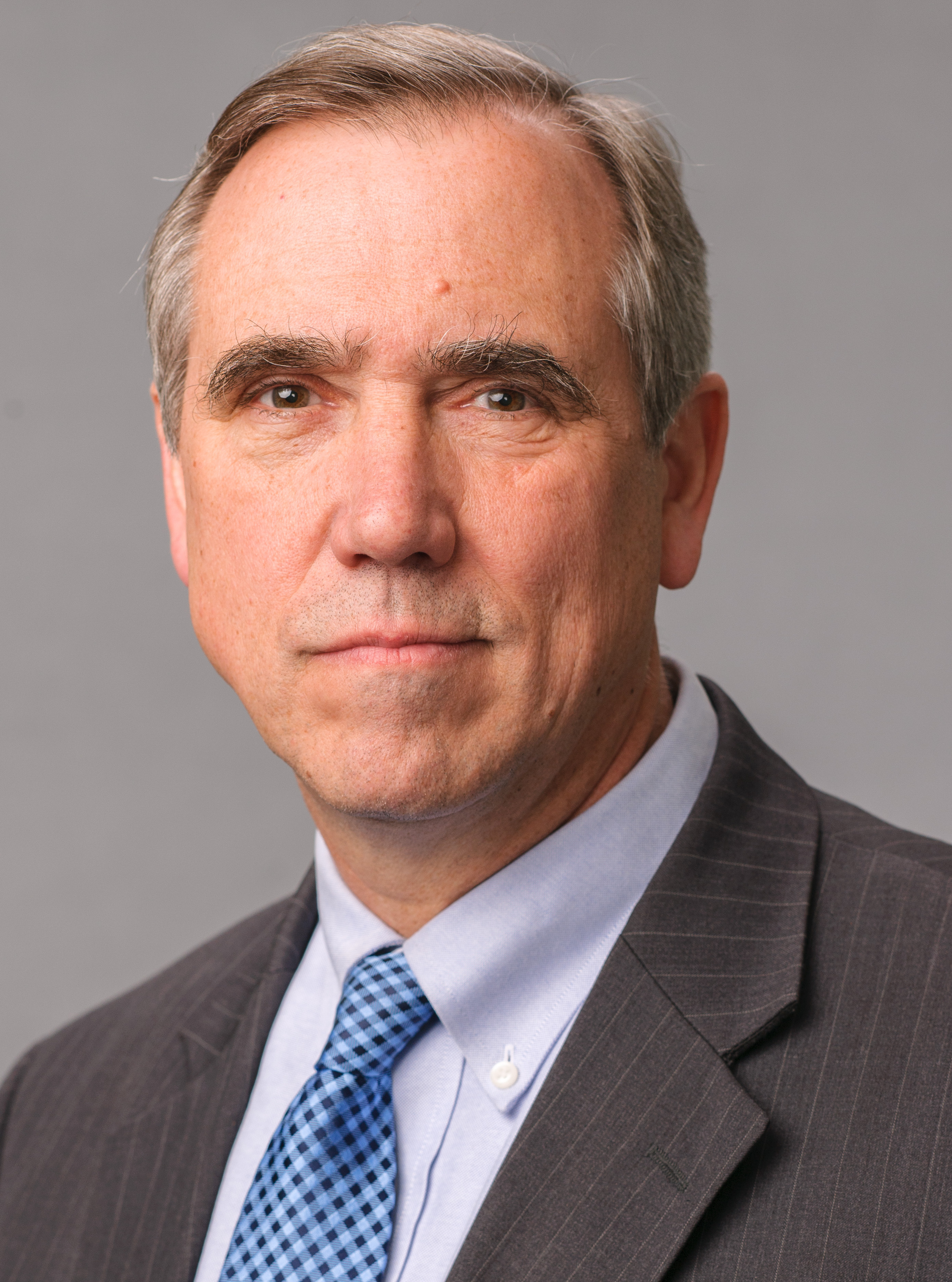

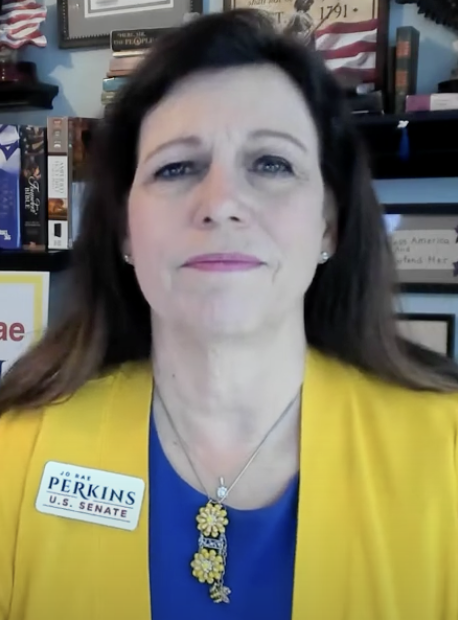
Nominee	Jeff Merkley	Jo Rae Perkins
Party	Democratic	Republican
Popular vote	1,321,047	912,814
Percentage	56.91%	39.32%
- Merkley: 40–50% 50–60% 60–70% 70–80% 80–90% >90% Perkins: 40–50% 50–60% 60–70% 70–80% 80–90% >90% Tie: 40–50% 50% No data
U.S. senator before election
Jeff Merkley
Democratic
Elected U.S. Senator
Jeff Merkley
Democratic

The 2020 United States Senate election in Oregon was held on November 3, 2020, to elect a member of the United States Senate to represent the State of Oregon, concurrently with the 2020 U.S. presidential election, as well as other elections to the United States Senate, elections to the United States House of Representatives, and various state and local elections.

Incumbent Democratic senator Jeff Merkley won reelection to a third term in office. Although this Senate seat was largely expected to be one of the safest for the Democrats, the race received national attention due to the Republican nominee Jo Rae Perkins's promotion of the unfounded QAnon conspiracy theory. Furthermore, Perkins flipped five counties that Merkley had won in 2014 (though only by pluralities in the cases of Jackson, Polk and Yamhill). That said, Merkley overperformed Democrat Joe Biden in the concurrent presidential election by about a point and a half.

== Democratic primary ==
=== Candidates ===
==== Nominee ====
- Jeff Merkley, incumbent U.S. senator (also nominated by the Oregon Independent Party and the Working Families Party)

==== Withdrawn ====
- Michael David, activist and ethnographer

=== Endorsements ===
Jeff Merkley

Organizations

- American Federation of Teachers - Oregon
- Council for a Livable World
- Democracy for America
- Human Rights Campaign
- Humane Society of the United States Legislative Fund
- League of Conservation Voters
- NARAL Pro-Choice America
- Oregon Education Association
- Oregon League of Conservation Voters
- SEIU Oregon State Council
- Sierra Club

=== Results ===
Democratic primary results
Party	Candidate	Votes	%
Democratic	Jeff Merkley (incumbent)	564,878	98.71%
Democratic	Write-in	7,386	1.29%
Total votes		572,264	100.0%

== Republican primary ==
=== Candidates ===
==== Nominee ====
- Jo Rae Perkins, former chairwoman of the Linn County Republican Party

==== Eliminated in primary ====
- Paul Romero, refrigeration repair technician and candidate for Oregon's 2nd congressional district in 2016 and 2018
- Robert Schwartz, dance teacher
- John Verbeek, financial executive and nominee for Oregon's 1st congressional district in 2018

==== Withdrawn ====
- Matthew Kulow

==== Declined ====
- Knute Buehler, former state representative for District 54, nominee for Oregon secretary of state in 2012 and governor of Oregon in 2018 (running for Oregon's 2nd congressional district)

=== Endorsements ===
Jo Rae Perkins

State representatives

- Mike Nearman, District 23

Individuals

- Jack Esp, 2020 candidate for Oregon's 21st House district
- Alek Skarlatos, Oregon Army National Guard veteran and 2020 candidate for Oregon's 4th congressional district

Organizations

- Oregon Right to Life PAC

=== Results ===
Results by county: Rae Perkins—50–60% Rae Perkins—40–50%

Republican primary results
Party	Candidate	Votes	%
Republican	Jo Rae Perkins	178,004	49.23%
Republican	Paul J. Romero, Jr.	109,783	30.36%
Republican	Robert Schwartz	40,196	11.12%
Republican	John Verbeek	29,382	8.13%
Republican	Write-in	4,250	1.17%
Total votes		361,615	100.0%

== Other candidates ==
=== Pacific Green Party ===
==== Nominee ====
- Ibrahim Taher, philosopher, anti-war activist, current member state coordinating committee in the Pacific Green Party (also nominated by the Oregon Progressive Party)

==== Endorsements ====
Ibra Taher

Individuals

- Dario Hunter, lawyer and 2020 candidate for president of the United States
- Cynthia McKinney, former United States Congress member and 2008 Green candidate for president of the United States
- David Rolde, 2020 Green candidate for president of the United States
- Cindy Sheehan, prominent anti-war activist

Organizations

- Oregon Progressive Party

=== Libertarian Party ===
==== Nominee ====
- Gary Dye, former refinery operator and engineer

== General election ==
=== Predictions ===
Source	Ranking	As of
The Cook Political Report	Solid D	October 29, 2020
Inside Elections	Safe D	October 28, 2020
Sabato's Crystal Ball	Safe D	November 2, 2020
Daily Kos	Safe D	October 30, 2020
Politico	Safe D	November 2, 2020
RCP	Safe D	October 23, 2020
DDHQ	Safe D	November 3, 2020
538	Safe D	November 2, 2020
Economist	Safe D	November 2, 2020

=== Additional general election endorsements ===
Jeff Merkley (D)

Organizations

- 350.org
- Blue America
- Center for Biological Diversity
- Demand Universal Healthcare
- End Citizens United
- Everytown for Gun Safety
- J Street PAC
- Joint Action Committee for Political Affairs
- MoveOn
- National Committee to Preserve Social Security and Medicare
- National Organization for Women
- Natural Resources Defense Council Action Fund
- Peace Action
- Planned Parenthood
- Planned Parenthood Advocates of Oregon
- Population Connection

Unions

- National Education Association
- Oregon AFL-CIO
- United Auto Workers

=== Polling ===
Poll source	Date(s) administered	Sample size (Note: Key: A – all adults RV – registered voters LV – likely voters V – unclear)	Margin of error	Jeff Merkley (D)	Jo Rae Perkins (R)	Other	Undecided
Civiqs/Daily Kos	September 26–29, 2020	944 (LV)	± 3.5%	55%	35%	5% (Note: Dye (L) and Taher (G) with 2%; "Someone else" with 1%)	5%

=== Results ===
2020 United States Senate election in Oregon
Party	Candidate	Votes	%	±%
Democratic	Jeff Merkley (incumbent)	1,321,047	56.91%	+1.18%
Republican	Jo Rae Perkins	912,814	39.32%	+2.45%
Libertarian	Gary Dye	42,747	1.84%	−1.23%
Pacific Green	Ibrahim Taher	42,239	1.82%	−0.40%
Write-in		2,402	0.10%	–0.35%
Total votes		2,321,249	100.00%	N/A
Democratic hold				

==== By county ====
By county

County	Jeff Merkley Democratic		Jo Rae Perkins Republican		Various candidates Other parties		Margin		Total votes
County	#	%	#	%	#	%	#	%	Total votes
Baker	2,633	27.01	6,863	70.39	254	2.61	-4,230	-43.38	9,750
Benton	35,021	67.29	14,811	28.46	2,211	4.25	20,210	38.83	52,043
Clackamas	134,813	53.79	106,838	42.63	8,989	3.59	27,975	11.16	250,640
Clatsop	13,052	55.48	9,623	40.91	849	3.61	3,429	14.58	23,524
Columbia	14,375	45.44	15,948	50.41	1,314	4.15	-1,573	-4.97	31,637
Coos	14,885	41.23	20,051	55.53	1,170	3.24	-5,166	-14.31	36,106
Crook	4,133	27.29	10,628	70.17	385	2.54	-6,495	-42.88	15,146
Curry	6,170	42.24	7,993	54.72	445	3.05	-1,823	-12.48	14,608
Deschutes	65,264	53.19	53,285	43.43	4,141	3.38	11,979	9.76	122,690
Douglas	20,707	33.03	40,036	63.87	1,942	3.10	-19,329	-30.84	62,685
Gilliam	373	31.96	765	65.55	29	2.49	-392	-33.59	1,167
Grant	1,119	24.80	3,273	72.52	121	2.68	-2,154	-47.73	4,513
Harney	1,055	24.10	3,213	73.41	109	2.49	-2,158	-49.30	4,377
Hood River	8,619	66.89	3,821	29.65	445	3.45	4,798	37.24	12,885
Jackson	59,093	47.54	61,010	49.08	4,200	3.38	-1,917	-1.54	124,303
Jefferson	4,591	39.07	6,810	57.95	351	2.99	-2,219	-18.88	11,752
Josephine	18,697	37.23	29,685	59.10	1,843	3.67	-10,988	-21.88	50,225
Klamath	11,237	31.23	23,579	65.53	1,166	3.24	-12,342	-34.30	35,982
Lake	908	21.29	3,261	76.46	96	2.25	-2,353	-55.17	4,265
Lane	133,033	61.26	75,550	34.79	8,575	3.95	57,483	26.47	217,158
Lincoln	17,485	57.88	11,628	38.49	1,095	3.62	5,857	19.39	30,208
Linn	27,048	38.29	40,801	57.76	2,795	3.96	-13,753	-19.47	70,644
Malheur	3,353	28.92	7,882	67.97	361	3.11	-4,529	-39.06	11,596
Marion	79,990	49.37	75,908	46.85	6,116	3.77	4,082	2.52	162,014
Morrow	1,558	30.94	3,324	66.02	153	3.04	-1,766	-35.07	5,035
Multnomah	356,870	78.53	78,673	17.31	18,875	4.15	278,197	61.22	454,418
Polk	22,893	48.16	22,931	48.24	1,707	3.59	-38	-0.08	47,531
Sherman	302	25.61	845	71.67	32	2.71	-543	-46.06	1,179
Tillamook	8,326	50.19	7,768	46.83	495	2.98	558	3.36	16,589
Umatilla	11,253	34.95	19,876	61.74	1,065	3.31	-8,623	-26.78	32,194
Union	4,545	31.12	9,674	66.24	386	2.64	-5,129	-35.12	14,605
Wallowa	1,702	33.56	3,267	64.43	102	2.01	-1,565	-30.86	5,071
Wasco	6,716	48.67	6,572	47.63	511	3.70	144	1.04	13,799
Washington	202,073	64.64	97,799	31.28	12,746	4.08	104,274	33.36	312,618
Wheeler	262	28.11	646	69.31	24	2.58	-384	-41.20	932
Yamhill	26,893	46.88	28,177	49.12	2,290	3.99	-1,284	-2.24	57,360
Totals	1,321,047	56.91	912,814	39.32	87,388	3.76	408,233	17.59	2,321,249

Counties that flipped from Democratic to Republican

- Columbia (largest municipality: St. Helens)
- Coos (largest municipality: Coos Bay)
- Jackson (largest municipality: Medford)
- Polk (largest municipality: West Salem)
- Yamhill (largest municipality: McMinnville)

==== By congressional district ====
Merkley won four of five congressional districts.

District	Merkley	Perkins	Representative
1st	62%	34%	Suzanne Bonamici
2nd	43%	53%	Cliff Bentz
3rd	73%	22%	Earl Blumenauer
4th	52%	44%	Peter DeFazio
5th	53%	43%	Kurt Schrader

== Notes ==
General
