= William Bryk =

American lawyer (born 1955)

William Bryk (born March 12, 1955) is an American lawyer.

== Biography ==
Bryk was born and raised near Albany, New York. He is an elected public official in the Town of Antrim, New Hampshire, a journalist, a horseman, a lawyer admitted to practice in New Hampshire and New York, and perennial candidate. He was a career civil servant for the City of New York from 1977 through 2010.

Before Bryk left his former residence in Brooklyn, New York, he took advantage of the Constitutional requirement that candidates for U.S. Senator or U.S. Representative live in the state in which they are campaigning by the day of the general election. This allowed Bryk to run in the primaries without ever visiting the state. Bryk generally ran in races that lacked a credible Democratic candidate.

Antrim's voters elected him Library Trustee, 2017; Cemetery Trustee, 2018, Planning Board Member, 2018, re-elected 2020; Cemetery Trustee, 2021; Supervisor of the Checklist, 2021, re-elected 2022; and Trustee of Trust Funds, 2021. In 2023, he was elected one of Antrim's two members of the Contoocook Valley School Board.

He was the Democratic nominee for Hillsborough County Register of Probate in 2016 and 2022, the Democratic nominee for Hillsborough County Treasurer in 2018 and 2020, and a Democratic nominee for State Representative from the Hillsborough County 30th District at the 2024 general election.

He is a former secretary and vice chairman of the Antrim Town Democratic Committee, a former delegate to the New Hampshire State Democratic Convention, and a Justice of the Peace.

== Education ==
Bachelor of Science in economics, Manhattan College, 1977; Juris Doctor, Fordham University School of Law, 1989.

== Elections ==
- In 2026, Bryk entered the Democratic primary for State Representative.
- In 2025, Bryk was defeated for Antrim Town Selectman.
- In 2024, Bryk was defeated for Antrim Town Selectman in March and nominated for the New Hampshire State House of Representatives in September.
- In 2023, Bryk was defeated for Antrim Town Selectman but elected one of Antrim's two representatives to the Contoocook Valley School Board.
- In 2022, Bryk lost the election for Hillsborough County Register of Probate.
- In 2020, Bryk lost the election for Hillsborough County Treasurer.
- In 2018, Bryk lost the election for Hillsborough County Treasurer.
- In 2016, Bryk lost the election for Hillsborough County Register of Probate.
- In 2014, Bryk ran for the US Senate simultaneously in Alaska, Oregon, Wyoming and Idaho, where he received 30.4 percent of the vote, losing in all four races. He also ran for Congress in Indiana but was removed from the ballot.
- In 2012, Bryk ran for the Senate in Wyoming and for Congress in Indiana, losing both races.
- In 2010, Bryk ran for the Senate in Idaho and lost.
- In 2004, Bryk sought the Federalist Party nomination for President of the United States.
- In 2000, Bryk won the Republican Vice-Presidential Primary in New Hampshire.
- In 1999, Bryk ran for District Attorney of Richmond County (Staten Island) and lost.
- In 1998, Bryk ran for the New York State Assembly and lost.
- In 1997, Bryk ran for New York City Council and lost.
- In 1996, Bryk ran for New York City Council and lost.
- In 1983, Bryk ran for Manhattan Community School District Board #6 and lost.
- In 1980, Bryk ran for Congress in New York in the 18th District and lost.
