= Jo Rae Perkins =

American perennial candidate (born 1956)

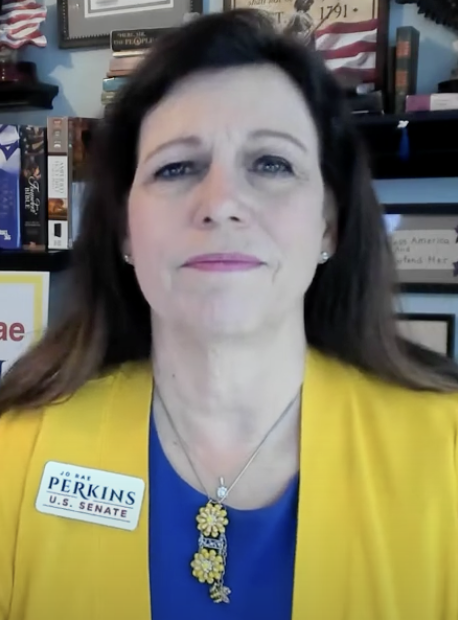
- Perkins in 2022

Personal details
- Born: May 9, 1956 (age 70) Portsmouth, Virginia, U.S.
- Party: Republican
- Spouse: George Perkins (m. 1978)
- Children: 2
- Education: Linn-Benton Community College (AS); Oregon State University (BA)

Jo Rae Perkins (born May 9, 1956) is an American perennial candidate who was the unsuccessful Republican nominee for both the 2020 U.S. Senate election and 2022 U.S. Senate election in Oregon. Perkins lives in Albany, Oregon, and has received national attention for her belief in QAnon.

== Personal life ==
Perkins was born in Portsmouth, Virginia. She graduated with an Associate of Science in business management from Linn–Benton Community College in 1998 and a Bachelor of Arts in political science from Oregon State University in 2013. Perkins attended accounting and financial planning classes at Golden West College and the University of Portland. She has resided in Albany, Oregon since 1975.

Perkins and her husband, George, a carpet installation contractor, have been married since 1978, and they have two children.

Perkins attended the protest at which the January 6 United States Capitol attack occurred, saying she attended because she did not believe the election vote tally was accurate. Perkins says she did not enter the Capitol building. Perkins also made unsubstantiated claims that Antifa stormed the Capitol. She posted videos of herself at the event on her Facebook page.

== Career ==
Perkins previously worked as a financial advisor. She also volunteered at the Northwest Art and Air Festival for many years, where she helped run air ballooning, relying on a class she took at Linn–Benton Community College.

Perkins served as chairwoman of the Linn County Republican Party from 2009 until 2012. She also served in a variety of roles with the Linn County Republican Women, and as an elected precinct committeeperson in Albany.

=== Legal issues ===
Perkins has experienced financial and legal issues. Perkins filed for personal bankruptcy twice and was fired in 2008 from her sales position at an investment company for violating its policy, according to a 2010 Albany Democrat-Herald article. She first filed for chapter 7 bankruptcy along with her husband in 1997, although the records about that filing were destroyed in a fire. Perkins again filed for bankruptcy in 2009 to settle $335,000 in debt, for which she was stripped of her Certified Financial Planner title in 2010 by that organization's board.

Perkins was arrested in December 2005 on charges of harassment and hindering prosecution, according to a 2013 article in The Oregonian. She was allegedly covering up for her son, who had evaded law enforcement after being stopped for speeding. Perkins later pleaded no contest to the charges.

== Political campaigns ==
Perkins was described as the "definition of a perennial candidate" by KOIN.

Perkins ran unsuccessful campaigns for Albany city council in 1994 and Albany mayor in 2010.

=== 2014 ===
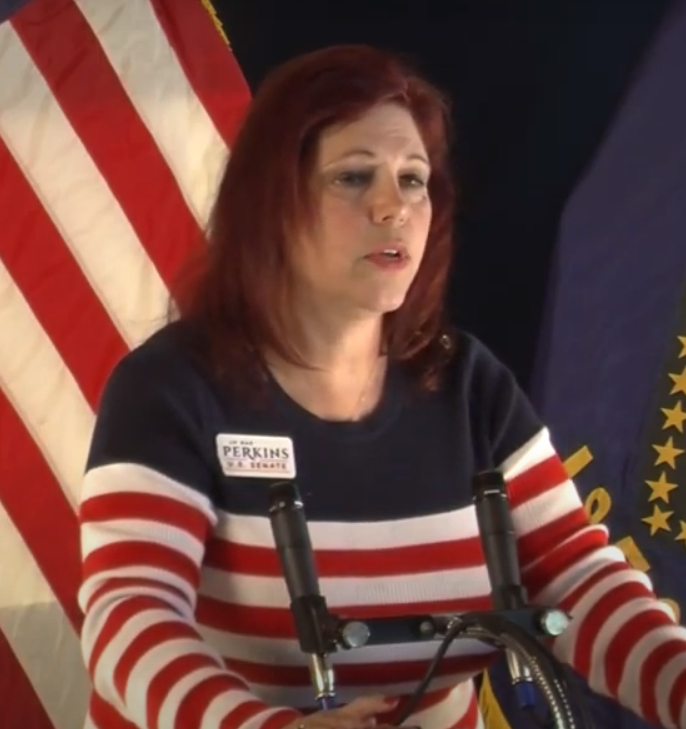
Perkins at a 2014 senate candidate forum

Perkins was the first Republican challenger to enter the 2014 Oregon Republican U.S. Senate primary, entering the race on August 16 in her first federal election attempt. Perkins said she decided to run in large part out of concern regarding erosion of states' rights. Her campaign expressed dissatisfaction after she was not invited to a January debate between the two front-runners at the Dorchester Conference. As of February 2014, she had raised just under $4,600 (~$6,256 in 2025) in campaign funding for the year, the least out of the four eventual Republican candidates. Perkins lost the Republican primary, coming in fourth place with 3% of the vote.

=== 2016 ===
In 2016, Perkins ran for Oregon's 4th congressional district and finished in second place with 32% of the vote in the Republican primary behind Art Robinson.

=== 2018 ===
Perkins was again a candidate in 2018 in Oregon's 4th congressional district, placing third behind Robinson and Court Boice in the Republican primary.

=== 2020 ===
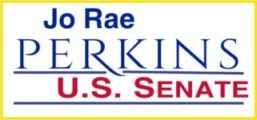
Senate campaign logo

In 2019, Perkins filed again to run for the Republican nomination in Oregon Congressional District 4. However, she dropped out of the 4th District race when she filed instead to run for the U.S. Republican Senate primary, saying she was inspired by what she described as incumbent Democratic Senator Jeff Merkley's focus on "sham impeachment trials." Between entering the race and March 2020, Perkins raised over $25,000 (~$29,768 in 2024) in publicly declared campaign funds, with many donations on WinRed, the official Republican National Convention fundraising platform. Perkins later received an endorsement and $5000 in donations from former Arkansas governor Mike Huckabee's political action committee. Perkins won the primary on May 19, 2020, and opposed the Democratic incumbent Senator Jeff Merkley in November for the general election. She finished with nearly fifty percent of the vote in the primary, well ahead of her three challengers.

Perkins spoke at the "Cruise for Trump Campaign Kickoff Rally" alongside Kim Thatcher, a Republican challenger for Secretary of State. Perkins denounced the use of masks, garnering applause. Perkins ran an underdog campaign to unseat Merkley, and her efforts were supported by party leaders. In late 2020, Perkins sued to remove the Libertarian candidate Gary Dye from the ballot. Her legal argument asserted that a 2011 ruling by the secretary of state allowed improper voting behaviors supporting one libertarian faction, and that she would be the main candidate who would otherwise have received the votes that would go to Dye. A judge dismissed the lawsuit in mid-September.

Perkins lost against Merkley, garnering 39% of the vote to Merkley's 57%. She won 24 less populous counties out of the 36 in the state, her wins largely in the rural Southern and Eastern parts of the state. Though Perkins received less institutional support from the GOP and donors, she received votes comparable to other Republican candidates in the election.

=== 2022 ===
Having been secretary of the Oregon Republican Party, Perkins again ran for U.S. Senate in 2022, vying to unseat longtime Democratic incumbent Ron Wyden. She announced her campaign at a November 8, 2020 Stop the Steal rally in Salem, Oregon, five days after her loss to Merkley. She won the Republican primary, held on May 17 2022, with 33.3% of the vote. Perkins had raised $38,800 by June, and $92,000 by the conclusion of the campaign. She lost the general election to Wyden, garnering 41% of the vote.

=== 2026 ===
Perkins once again ran for the U.S. Senate in 2026, attempting to challenge Jeff Merkley for a second time and become the Republican nominee for U.S. Senator in a third consecutive election. However, she lost the Republican primary to State Senator David Brock Smith, placing second and losing by approximately two percentage points.

== Political positions ==
Perkins identifies as pro-life. She supports accepting permanent residency for undocumented immigrants as long as further measures are taken to secure the Mexico–United States border. Perkins advocates for the DREAM Act. Perkins supports repealing the Affordable Care Act and abolishing the Federal Reserve. She supports replacing federal income taxes with federal consumption taxes. She supports privatizing Medicare and Social Security. Perkins advocates for zero-based budgeting in federal executive departments. She supports federal term limits at 12 years each in the House and Senate.

In August 2020, Perkins declared her opposition to the use of masks against COVID-19, saying she had done much research on the issue and distrusted experts and official death statistics. She also opposed the George Floyd protests in Portland, Oregon.

In 2014, Perkins signed the Tea Party movement-affiliated Contract from America.

=== Relationship with QAnon ===
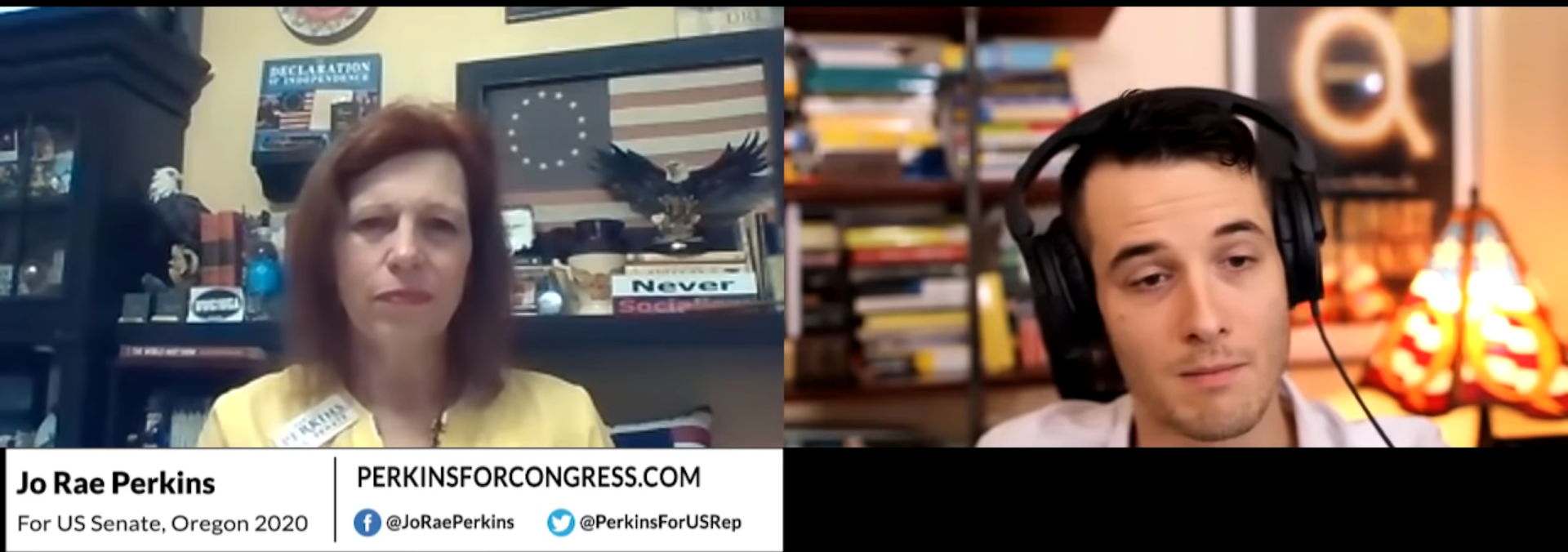
Perkins interviewed on the QAnon YouTube channel of Dustin Nemos in January 2020

Perkins supports the QAnon conspiracy theory and has participated in it since at least 2018. During Perkins's victory speech for the Oregon Republican Senate primary, she repeatedly invoked a catchphrase associated with the QAnon conspiracy theory and expressed appreciation for the QAnon supporters whom she met during her campaign. In this victory video, which was subsequently deleted, Perkins said, "I stand with President Trump. I stand with Q and the team. Thank you Anons, and thank you patriots. And together, we can save our republic." Perkins said she had removed the video under advice from a campaign consultant, that she regretted the removal, and that she continued to view the QAnon forums as one source of information among many that she valued during an interview with Oregon Public Broadcasting a few days after the video was taken down. Larry McDonald, Perkins's campaign manager, stated in May 2020 that Perkins only believed in certain facets of QAnon. In June 2020, she took a 'digital soldier oath' inspired by QAnon promoter Michael Flynn.

Party political offices
Preceded by Monica Wehby	Republican nominee for U.S. Senator from Oregon (Class 2); 2020	Succeeded by David Brock Smith
Preceded by Mark Callahan	Republican nominee for U.S. Senator from Oregon (Class 3); 2022	Most recent
