= 2014 United States House of Representatives elections in Oregon =

- November 4, 2014

All 5 Oregon seats to the United States House of Representatives
	Majority party	Minority party
Party	Democratic	Republican
Last election	4	1
Seats won	4	1
Seat change	Steady	Steady
Popular vote	778,139	582,909
Percentage	53.64%	40.18%
Swing	▼1.96%	▼0.09%

Democratic
40–50%
50–60%
60–70%
70–80%
Republican
40–50%
50–60%
60–70%
70–80%
80–90%

The 2014 United States House of Representatives elections in Oregon were held on Tuesday, November 4, 2014, to elect the five U.S. representatives from the state of Oregon, one from each of the state's five congressional districts. The elections coincided with the elections of other federal and state offices, including the governor of Oregon and a United States senator. Primary elections were held on May 20, 2014.

== Overview ==
United States House of Representatives elections in Oregon, 2014
Party	Votes	Percentage	Seats	+/–
Democratic	778,139	53.64%	4	-
Republican	582,909	40.18%	1	-
Libertarian	37,959	2.62%		-
Pacific Green	30,132	2.08%		-
Constitution	6,208	0.43%		-
write-ins	15,355	1.06%		-
Totals	1,450,702	100.00%	5	-

=== By district ===
Results of the 2014 United States House of Representatives elections in Oregon by district:

District	Democratic		Republican		Others		Total		Result
District	Votes	%	Votes	%	Votes	%	Votes	%	Result
District 1	160,038	57.31%	96,245	34.47%	15,605	5.59%	279,253	100.0%	Democratic hold
District 2	73,785	25.67%	202,374	70.41%	11,266	3.92%	287,425	100.0%	Republican hold
District 3	211,748	72.33%	57,424	19.61%	23,585	8.06%	292,757	100.0%	Democratic hold
District 4	181,624	58.55%	116,534	37.57%	12,021	3.88%	310,179	100.0%	Democratic hold
District 5	150,944	53.70%	110,332	39.25%	19,812	7.05%	281,088	100.0%	Democratic hold
Total	778,139	53.64%	582,909	40.18%	89,654	6.18%	1,450,702	100.0%	

== District 1 ==
2014 Oregon's 1st congressional district election
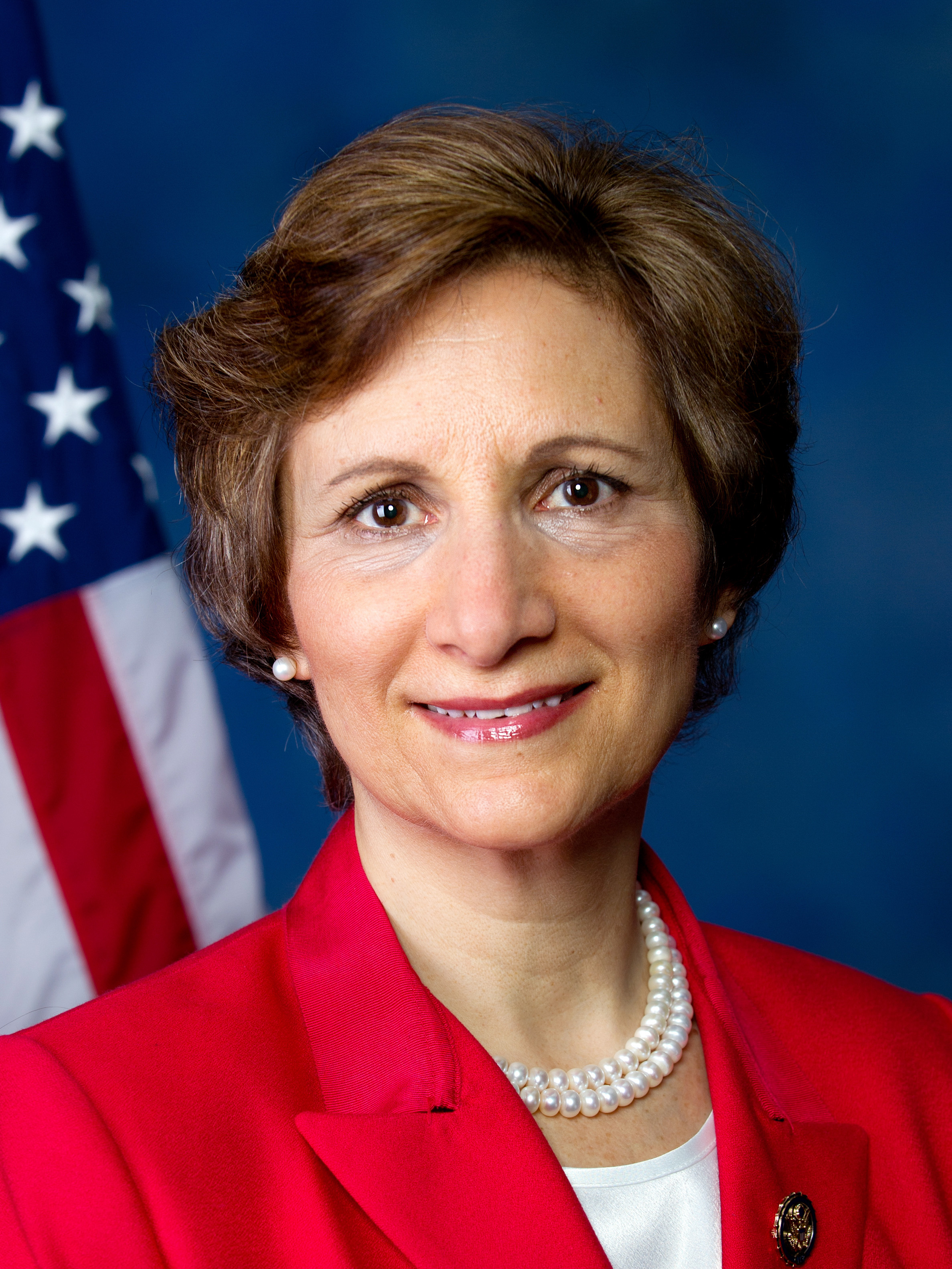

Nominee	Suzanne Bonamici	Jason Yates
Party	Democratic	Republican
Popular vote	160,038	96,245
Percentage	57.3%	34.5%
- County results Bonamici: 50–60% 70–80% Yates: 40–50%
U.S. Representative before election
Suzanne Bonamici
Democratic
Elected U.S. Representative
Suzanne Bonamici
Democratic

The 1st district is located in the northwest corner of Oregon. Incumbent Democrat Suzanne Bonamici, who had represented the district since winning a special election in 2012, ran for re-election. She was re-elected with 60% of the vote in 2012 and the district had a PVI of D+7.

=== Democratic primary ===
==== Candidates ====
===== Nominee =====
- Suzanne Bonamici, incumbent U.S. Representative

==== Results ====
Democratic primary results
Party	Candidate	Votes	%
Democratic	Suzanne Bonamici (incumbent)	50,903	98.8
Democratic	Write-ins	601	1.2
Total votes		51,504	100.0

=== Republican primary ===
==== Candidates ====
===== Nominee =====
- Jason Yates, pest control service manager

===== Eliminated in primary =====
- Delinda Delgado Morgan, heavy-equipment operator, winemaker and martial arts instructor
- Bob Niemeyer, mechanical engineer

==== Results ====
Republican primary results
Party	Candidate	Votes	%
Republican	Jason Yates	16,466	42.3
Republican	Delinda Delgado Morgan	15,521	39.9
Republican	Bob Niemeyer	6,637	17.0
Republican	Write-ins	312	0.8
Total votes		38,936	100.0

=== General election ===
==== Predictions ====
Source	Ranking	As of
The Cook Political Report	Safe D	November 3, 2014
Rothenberg	Safe D	October 24, 2014
Sabato's Crystal Ball	Safe D	October 30, 2014
RCP	Safe D	November 2, 2014
Daily Kos Elections	Safe D	November 4, 2014

==== Results ====
Oregon's 1st congressional district, 2014
Party	Candidate	Votes	%
Democratic	Suzanne Bonamici (incumbent)	160,038	57.3
Republican	Jason Yates	96,245	34.5
Libertarian	James Foster	11,213	4.0
Pacific Green	Steven C. Reynolds	11,163	4.0
n/a	Write-ins	594	0.2
Total votes		279,253	100.0
Democratic hold			

== District 2 ==
2014 Oregon's 2nd congressional district election
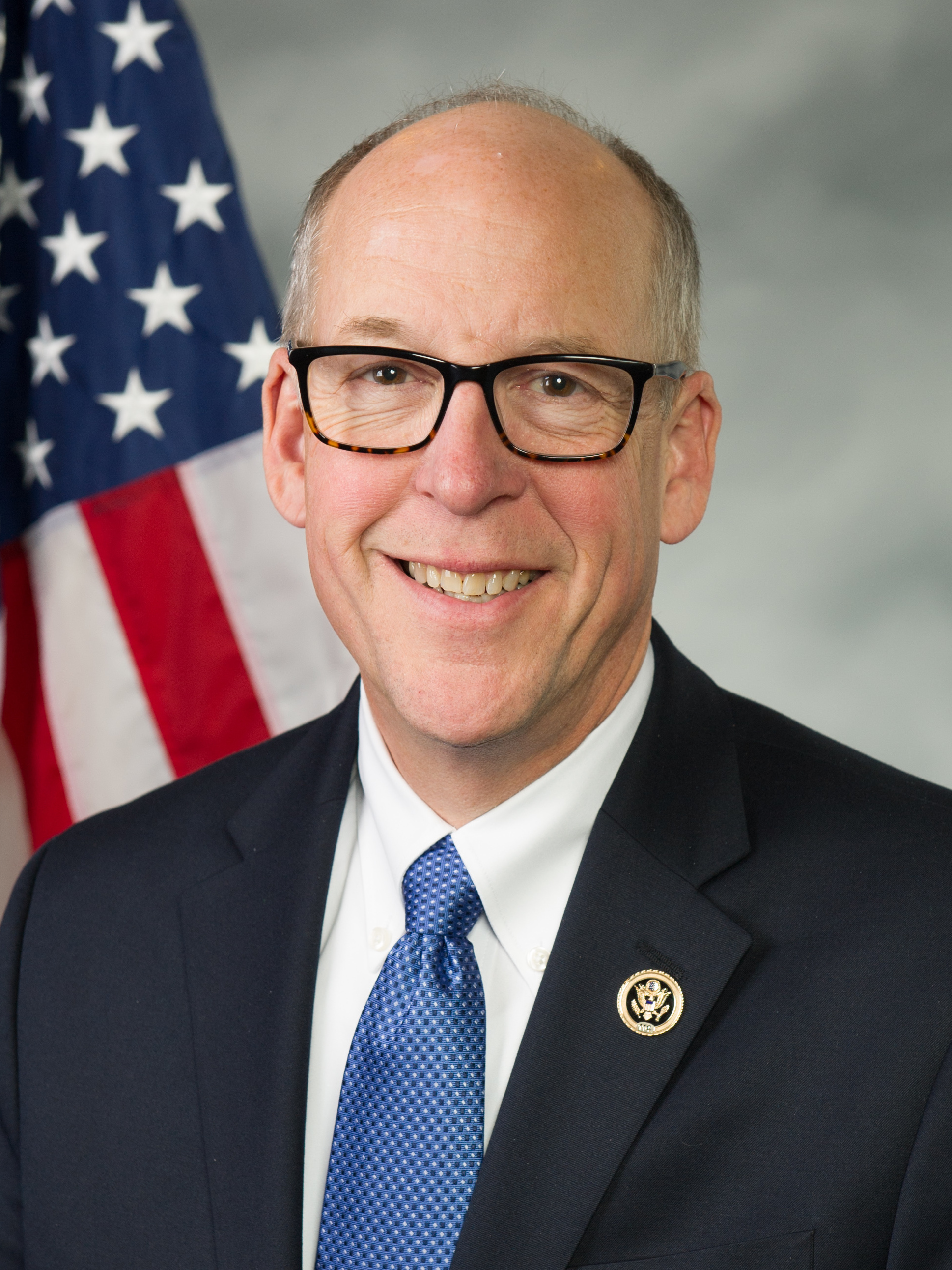

Nominee	Greg Walden	Aelea Christofferson
Party	Republican	Democratic
Popular vote	202,374	73,785
Percentage	70.4%	25.7%
- County results Walden: 50–60% 60–70% 70–80% 80–90%
U.S. Representative before election
Greg Walden
Republican
Elected U.S. Representative
Greg Walden
Republican

The 2nd district is located east of the Willamette Valley and covers roughly two-thirds of the state. It is the largest of Oregon's five districts and is the seventh-largest district in the nation. Incumbent Republican Greg Walden, the Chairman of the National Republican Congressional Committee, who had represented the district since 1999, ran for re-election. He was re-elected with 69% of the vote in 2012 and the district had a PVI of R+10.

=== Republican primary ===
The Club for Growth targeted Walden for a primary challenge.

==== Candidates ====
===== Nominee =====
- Greg Walden, incumbent U.S. Representative

===== Eliminated in primary =====
- Dennis Linthicum, Klamath County Commissioner

==== Results ====
Republican primary results
Party	Candidate	Votes	%
Republican	Greg Walden (incumbent)	64,603	75.5
Republican	Dennis Linthicum	20,745	24.3
Republican	Write-ins	185	0.2
Total votes		85,533	100.0

=== Democratic primary ===
==== Candidates ====
===== Nominee =====
- Aelea Christofferson, business owner

===== Eliminated in primary =====
- Barney Spera, retired United States Marine and union president
- C. F. Vulliet, attorney and writer

==== Results ====
Democratic primary results
Party	Candidate	Votes	%
Democratic	Aelea Christofferson	24,407	61.8
Democratic	Barney Spera	7,996	20.2
Democratic	C. F. Vulliet	6,103	15.5
Democratic	Write-ins	1,007	2.5
Total votes		39,513	100.0

=== General election ===
==== Predictions ====
Source	Ranking	As of
The Cook Political Report	Safe R	November 3, 2014
Rothenberg	Safe R	October 24, 2014
Sabato's Crystal Ball	Safe R	October 30, 2014
RCP	Safe R	November 2, 2014
Daily Kos Elections	Safe R	November 4, 2014

==== Results ====
Oregon's 2nd congressional district, 2014
Party	Candidate	Votes	%
Republican	Greg Walden (incumbent)	202,374	70.4
Democratic	Aelea Christofferson	73,785	25.7
Libertarian	Sharon L. Durbin	10,491	3.6
n/a	Write-ins	775	0.3
Total votes		287,425	100.0
Republican hold			

== District 3 ==
2014 Oregon's 3rd congressional district election
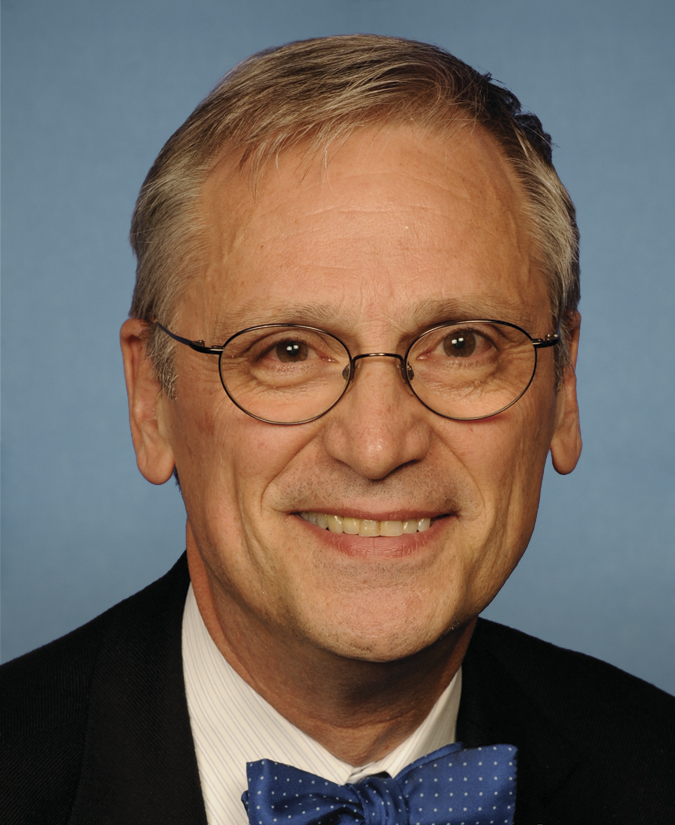

Nominee	Earl Blumenauer	James Buchal
Party	Democratic	Republican
Popular vote	211,748	57,424
Percentage	72.3%	19.6%
- County results Blumenauer: 40–50% 70–80%
U.S. Representative before election
Earl Blumenauer
Democratic
Elected U.S. Representative
Earl Blumenauer
Democratic

The 3rd district contains most of Multnomah County, including Portland east of the Willamette River, Gresham and Troutdale. Incumbent Democrat Earl Blumenauer, who had represented the district since 1996, ran for re-election.

The Republican nominee was James Buchal, the chair of the Multnomah County Republican Party and the party's nominee for Oregon Attorney General in 2012.

Blumenauer was re-elected with 75% of the vote in 2012 and the district had a PVI of D+22.

=== Democratic primary ===
==== Candidates ====
===== Nominee =====
- Earl Blumenauer, incumbent U.S. Representative

==== Results ====
Democratic primary results
Party	Candidate	Votes	%
Democratic	Earl Blumenauer (incumbent)	69,753	98.6
Democratic	Write-ins	969	1.4
Total votes		70,722	100.0

=== Republican primary ===
==== Candidates ====
===== Nominee =====
- James Buchal, attorney

==== Results ====
Republican primary results
Party	Candidate	Votes	%
Republican	James Buchal	15,083	97.8
Republican	Write-ins	338	2.2
Total votes		15,421	100.0

=== General election ===
==== Predictions ====
Source	Ranking	As of
The Cook Political Report	Safe D	November 3, 2014
Rothenberg	Safe D	October 24, 2014
Sabato's Crystal Ball	Safe D	October 30, 2014
RCP	Safe D	November 2, 2014
Daily Kos Elections	Safe D	November 4, 2014

==== Results ====
Oregon's 3rd congressional district, 2014
Party	Candidate	Votes	%
Democratic	Earl Blumenauer (incumbent)	211,748	72.3
Republican	James Buchal	57,424	19.6
Pacific Green	Michael Meo	12,106	4.1
Libertarian	Jeffrey J. Langan	6,381	2.2
Independent	David Walker	4,009	1.4
n/a	Write-ins	1,089	0.4
Total votes		292,757	100.0
Democratic hold			

== District 4 ==
2014 Oregon's 4th congressional district election
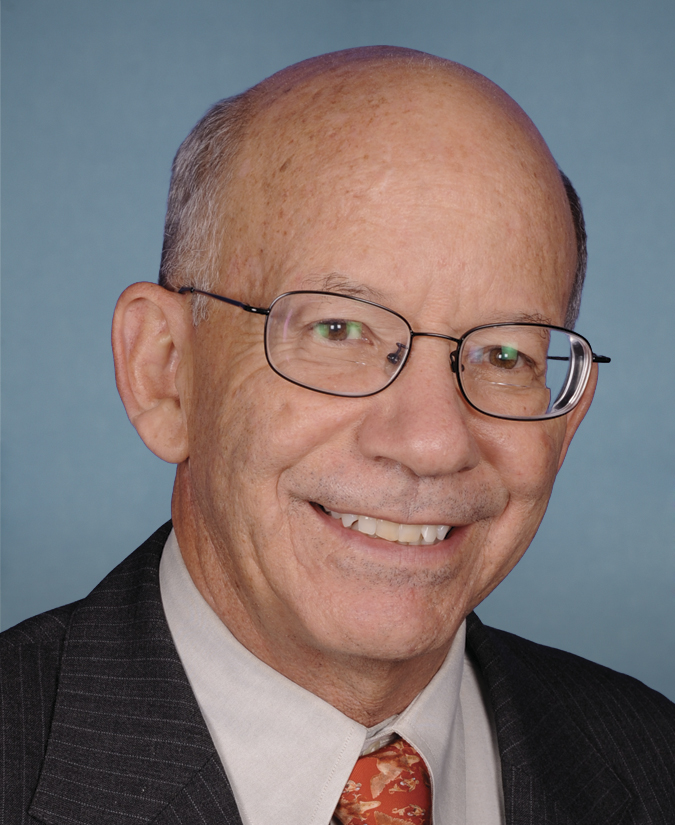

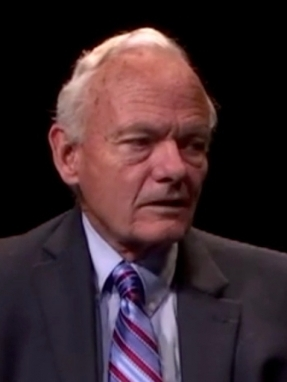
Nominee	Peter DeFazio	Art Robinson
Party	Democratic	Republican
Popular vote	181,624	116,534
Percentage	58.6%	37.6%
- County results Defazio: 50–60% 60–70% Robinson: 40–50% 50–60%
U.S. Representative before election
Peter DeFazio
Democratic
Elected U.S. Representative
Peter DeFazio
Democratic

The 4th district the southern half of Oregon's coastal counties, including Coos, Curry, Douglas, Lane and Linn counties and most of Benton and Josephine counties. Incumbent Democrat Peter DeFazio, who had represented the district since 1987, ran for re-election. He was re-elected with 59% of the vote in 2012 and the district had a PVI of D+2.

=== Democratic primary ===
==== Candidates ====
===== Nominee =====
- Peter DeFazio, incumbent U.S. Representative

==== Results ====
Democratic primary results
Party	Candidate	Votes	%
Democratic	Peter DeFazio (incumbent)	57,970	98.3
Democratic	Write-ins	1,016	1.7
Total votes		58,986	100.0

=== Republican primary ===
==== Candidates ====
===== Nominee =====
- Arthur B. Robinson, chemist, Chairman of the Oregon Republican Party and nominee for this seat in 2010 and 2012

==== Results ====
Republican primary, 2014
Party	Candidate	Votes	%
Republican	Arthur B. Robinson	45,391	97.3
Republican	write-ins	1,255	2.7
Total votes		46,646	100.0

=== General election ===
==== Predictions ====
Source	Ranking	As of
The Cook Political Report	Safe D	November 3, 2014
Rothenberg	Safe D	October 24, 2014
Sabato's Crystal Ball	Safe D	October 30, 2014
RCP	Safe D	November 2, 2014
Daily Kos Elections	Safe D	November 4, 2014

==== Results ====
Oregon's 4th congressional district, 2014
Party	Candidate	Votes	%
Democratic	Peter DeFazio (incumbent)	181,624	58.6
Republican	Art Robinson	116,534	37.6
Pacific Green	Mike Beilstein	6,863	2.2
Libertarian	David L. Chester	4,676	1.5
n/a	Write-ins	482	0.1
Total votes		310,152	100.0
Democratic hold			

== District 5 ==
2014 Oregon's 5th congressional district election
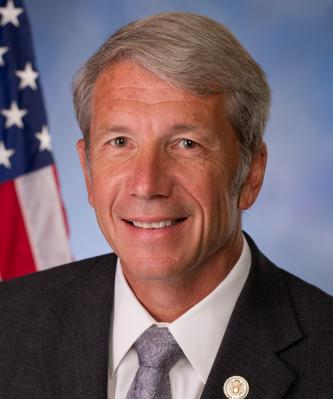

Nominee	Kurt Schrader	Tootie Smith
Party	Democratic	Republican
Popular vote	150,944	110,332
Percentage	53.7%	39.3%
- County results Schrader: 40–50% 50–60% 60–70%
U.S. Representative before election
Kurt Schrader
Democratic
Elected U.S. Representative
Kurt Schrader
Democratic

The 5th district includes Oregon's central coast through Salem, north to the southern Portland suburbs and east to the summit of Mount Hood. Incumbent Democrat Kurt Schrader, who had represented the district since 2009, ran for re-election. He was re-elected with 54% of the vote in 2012 and the district had an even PVI.

=== Democratic primary ===
==== Candidates ====
===== Nominee =====
- Kurt Schrader, incumbent U.S. Representative

===== Eliminated in primary =====
- Anita Brown, former U.S. Army medical specialist and retired union worker

==== Results ====
Democratic primary results
Party	Candidate	Votes	%
Democratic	Kurt Schrader (incumbent)	42,041	83.1
Democratic	Anita Brown	8,106	16.0
Democratic	Write-ins	445	0.9
Total votes		50,592	100.0

=== Republican primary ===
==== Candidates ====
===== Nominee =====
- Tootie Smith, Clackamas County Commissioner

===== Eliminated in primary =====
- Ben Pollock, former Congressional aide and businessman

==== Results ====
Oregon's 5th congressional district Republican primary, 2014
Party	Candidate	Votes	%
Republican	Tootie Smith	31,883	62.9
Republican	Ben Pollock	18,595	36.6
Republican	Write-ins	268	0.5
Total votes		50,746	100.0

=== General election ===
==== Predictions ====
Source	Ranking	As of
The Cook Political Report	Safe D	November 3, 2014
Rothenberg	Safe D	October 24, 2014
Sabato's Crystal Ball	Safe D	October 30, 2014
RCP	Safe D	November 2, 2014
Daily Kos Elections	Safe D	November 4, 2014

==== Results ====
Oregon's 5th congressional district, 2014
Party	Candidate	Votes	%
Democratic	Kurt Schrader (incumbent)	150,944	53.7
Republican	Tootie Smith	110,332	39.3
Independent	Marvin Sannes	7,674	2.7
Constitution	Raymond Baldwin	6,208	2.2
Libertarian	Daniel K. Souza	5,198	1.8
n/a	Write-ins	732	0.3
Total votes		281,088	100.0
Democratic hold			

== See also ==
- 2014 United States House of Representatives elections
- 2014 Oregon elections
- 2014 United States Senate election in Oregon
- 2014 Oregon gubernatorial election
