= 2012 United States House of Representatives elections in Oregon =

- November 6, 2012

All 5 Oregon seats to the United States House of Representatives
	Majority party	Minority party
Party	Democratic	Republican
Last election	4	1
Seats won	4	1
Seat change	Steady	Steady
Popular vote	949,660	687,839
Percentage	55.60%	40.27%
Swing	▲4.29%	▼5.70%

Democratic
40–50%
50–60%
60–70%
70–80%
Republican
50–60%
60–70%
70–80%
80–90%

The 2012 United States House of Representatives elections in Oregon were held on Tuesday, November 6, 2012, to elect the five U.S. representatives from the state of Oregon, apportioned according to the 2010 United States census. The elections coincided with the elections of other federal and state offices, including a quadrennial presidential election. All five incumbents, four Democrats and one Republican, were re-elected to another term.

Primary elections for Democrats and Republicans were held on May 15, 2012; other parties had other nominating procedures. Several candidates received nominations for multiple parties, as permitted by Oregon law.

== Overview ==
United States House of Representatives elections in Oregon, 2012
Party	Votes	Percentage	Seats	+/–
Democratic	949,660	55.60%	4	-
Republican	687,839	40.27%	1	-
Libertarian	34,879	2.04%		-
Pacific Green	20,675	1.21%		-
Constitution	12,518	0.73%		-
write-ins	2,597	0.15%		-
Totals	1,708,168	100.00%	5	-

== Redistricting ==
On June 29, 2011, members of the Oregon Legislative Assembly reached an agreement on redistricting all five of Oregon's congressional districts, as required by population changes from the 2010 census. Among other changes, Downtown Portland was moved from District 1 to District 3; District 2 ceded more of the Grants Pass area to District 4; and District 5 was changed to include more of Clackamas County and only small parts of Multnomah County.

== District 1 ==
2012 Oregon's 1st congressional district election
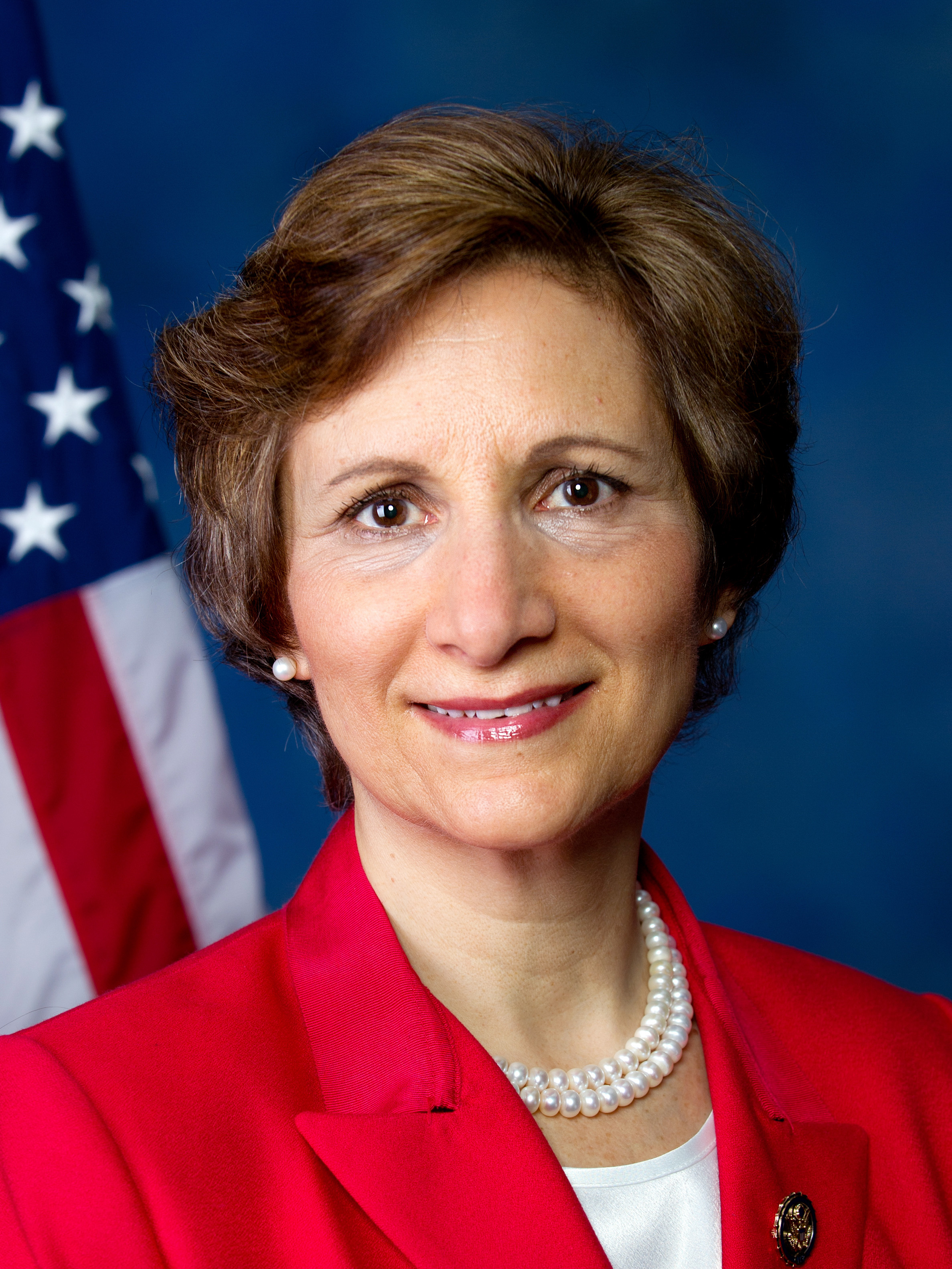

Nominee	Suzanne Bonamici	Delinda Morgan
Party	Democratic	Republican
Popular vote	197,845	109,699
Percentage	59.6%	33.0%
U.S. Representative before election
Suzanne Bonamici
Democratic
Elected U.S. Representative
Suzanne Bonamici
Democratic

Oregon's 1st congressional district is represented by Democrat Suzanne Bonamici, the winner of a January 2012 special election held after Representative David Wu resigned following allegations of an unwanted sexual encounter following the resolution of the 2011 U.S. debt ceiling crisis. The district has a PVI of D+6.

=== Democratic primary ===
==== Candidates ====
===== Nominee =====
- Suzanne Bonamici, incumbent U.S. Representative

===== Declined =====
- Brad Avakian, state Commissioner of Labor and Industries and candidate for this seat in 2012 (special)
- Ryan Deckert, former state senator
- Elizabeth Furse, former U.S. Representative
- Greg Macpherson, former state representative
- Dan Saltzman, Portland city commissioner
- Brad Witt, state representative and candidate for this seat in 2012 (special)

==== Primary results ====
Democratic primary results
Party	Candidate	Votes	%
Democratic	Suzanne Bonamici (incumbent)	57,146	98.9
Democratic	Write-ins	608	1.1
Total votes		57,754	100.0

=== Republican primary ===
==== Candidates ====
===== Nominee =====
- Delinda Morgan, vineyard owner

===== Eliminated in primary =====
- Lisa Michaels, activist, cable host and candidate for this seat in 2012 (special)

===== Declined =====
- Rob Cornilles, sports marketing consultant and nominee for this seat in 2010 & 2012 (special)
- Rob Miller, businessman
- Bruce Starr state senator

==== Results ====
Republican primary results
Party	Candidate	Votes	%
Republican	Delinda Morgan	18,996	56.4
Republican	Lisa Michaels	14,274	42.3
Republican	Write-ins	447	1.3
Total votes		33,717	100.0

=== General election ===
==== Predictions ====
Source	Ranking	As of
The Cook Political Report	Safe D	November 5, 2012
Rothenberg	Safe D	November 2, 2012
Roll Call	Safe D	November 4, 2012
Sabato's Crystal Ball	Safe D	November 5, 2012
NY Times	Safe D	November 4, 2012
RCP	Safe D	November 4, 2012
The Hill	Safe D	November 4, 2012

==== Results ====
Oregon's 1st congressional district, 2012
Party	Candidate	Votes	%
Democratic	Suzanne Bonamici (incumbent)	197,845	59.6
Republican	Delinda Morgan	109,699	33.0
Progressive	Steven Reynolds	15,009	4.5
Constitution	Bob Ekstrom	8,918	2.7
n/a	Write-ins	509	0.2
Total votes		331,980	100.0
Democratic hold			

== District 2 ==
2012 Oregon's 2nd congressional district election
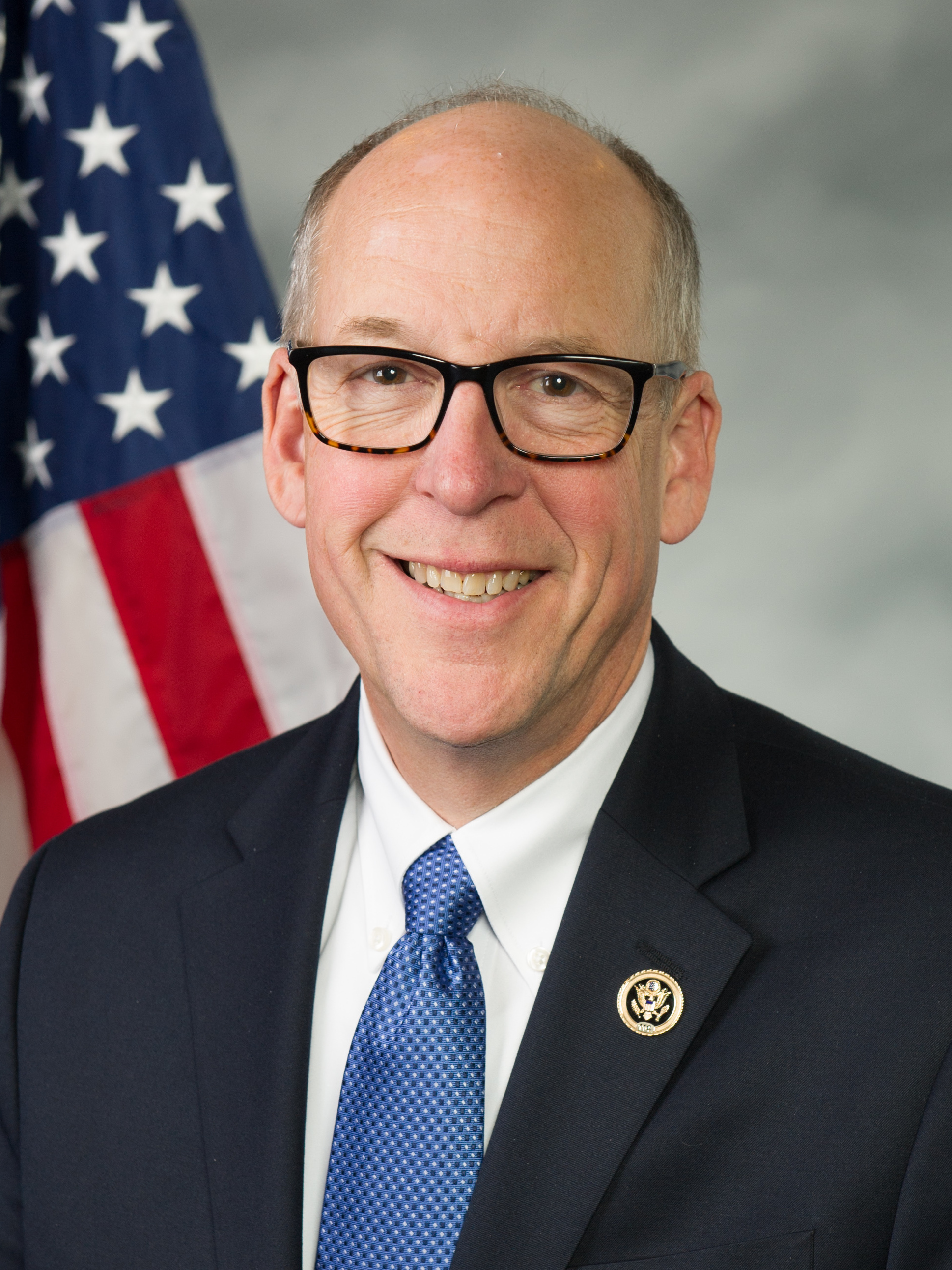

Nominee	Greg Walden	Joyce B. Segers
Party	Republican	Democratic
Popular vote	228,043	96,741
Percentage	68.7%	29.1%
U.S. Representative before election
Greg Walden
Republican
Elected U.S. Representative
Greg Walden
Republican

Republican Greg Walden has represented Oregon's 2nd congressional district since 1998 and is seeking re-election. The district has a PVI of R+10.

=== Republican primary ===
==== Candidates ====
===== Nominee =====
- Greg Walden, incumbent U.S. Representative

==== Primary results ====
Republican primary results
Party	Candidate	Votes	%
Republican	Greg Walden (incumbent)	77,498	99.3
Republican	Write-ins	581	0.7
Total votes		78,079	100.0

=== Democratic primary ===
==== Candidates ====
===== Nominee =====
- Joyce Segers, businesswoman, writer and nominee for this seat in 2010

===== Eliminated in primary =====
- John Sweeney, activist

==== Results ====
Democratic primary results
Party	Candidate	Votes	%
Democratic	Joyce Segers	31,157	76.5
Democratic	John Sweeney	8,825	21.7
Democratic	Write-ins	751	1.8
Total votes		40,733	100.0

=== General election ===
==== Predictions ====
Source	Ranking	As of
The Cook Political Report	Safe R	November 5, 2012
Rothenberg	Safe R	November 2, 2012
Roll Call	Safe R	November 4, 2012
Sabato's Crystal Ball	Safe R	November 5, 2012
NY Times	Safe R	November 4, 2012
RCP	Safe R	November 4, 2012
The Hill	Safe R	November 4, 2012

==== Results ====
Oregon's 2nd congressional district, 2012
Party	Candidate	Votes	%
Republican	Greg Walden (incumbent)	228,043	68.7
Democratic	Joyce B. Segers	96,741	29.1
Libertarian	Joe Tabor	7,025	2.1
n/a	Write-ins	446	0.1
Total votes		332,255	100.0
Republican hold			

== District 3 ==
2012 Oregon's 3rd congressional district election
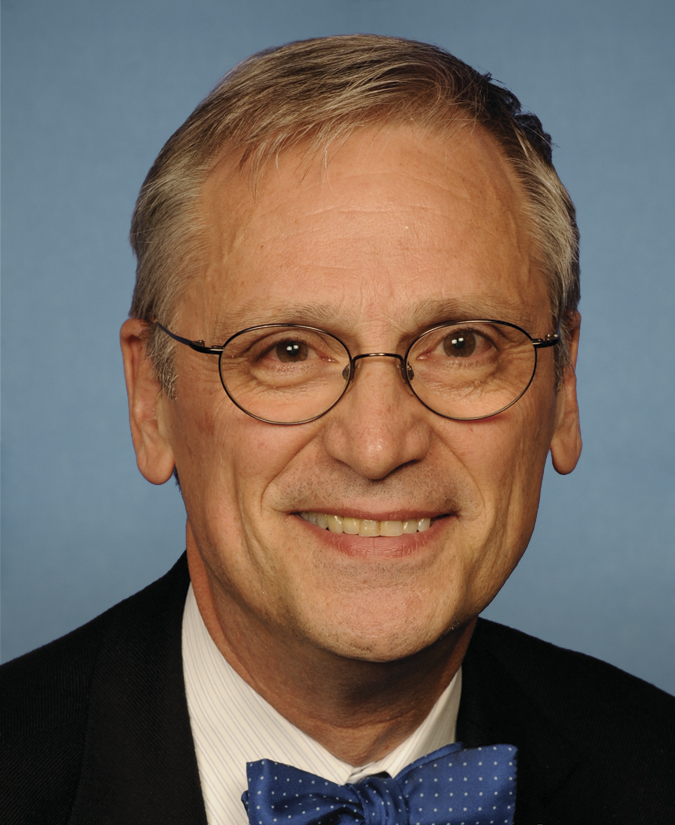

Nominee	Earl Blumenauer	Ronald Green
Party	Democratic	Republican
Popular vote	264,979	70,325
Percentage	74.4%	19.8%
- County results Blumenauer: 50–60% 70–80%
U.S. Representative before election
Earl Blumenauer
Democratic
Elected U.S. Representative
Earl Blumenauer
Democratic

Democrat Earl Blumenauer has represented Oregon's 3rd congressional district since 1996 and is seeking re-election. The district is the most Democratic-leaning district in the state, with a PVI of D+21.

=== Democratic primary ===
==== Candidates ====
===== Nominee =====
- Earl Blumenauer, incumbent U.S. Representative

==== Primary results ====
Democratic primary results
Party	Candidate	Votes	%
Democratic	Earl Blumenauer (incumbent)	84,628	98.9
Democratic	Write-ins	969	1.1
Total votes		85,597	100.0

=== Republican primary ===
==== Candidates ====
===== Nominee =====
- Ronald Green, bus operator

===== Eliminated in primary =====
- Delia Lopez, real estate investor

==== Results ====
Republican primary results
Party	Candidate	Votes	%
Republican	Ronald Green	14,844	63.2
Republican	Delia Lopez	8,237	35.0
Republican	Write-ins	424	1.8
Total votes		23,505	100

=== General election ===
==== Predictions ====
Source	Ranking	As of
The Cook Political Report	Safe D	November 5, 2012
Rothenberg	Safe D	November 2, 2012
Roll Call	Safe D	November 4, 2012
Sabato's Crystal Ball	Safe D	November 5, 2012
NY Times	Safe D	November 4, 2012
RCP	Safe D	November 4, 2012
The Hill	Safe D	November 4, 2012

==== Results ====
Oregon's 3rd congressional district, 2012
Party	Candidate	Votes	%
Democratic	Earl Blumenauer (incumbent)	264,979	74.4
Republican	Ronald Green	70,325	19.8
Pacific Green	Woodrow Broadnax	13,159	3.7
Libertarian	Michael Cline	6,640	1.9
n/a	Write-ins	772	0.2
Total votes		355,875	100.0
Democratic hold			

== District 4 ==
2012 Oregon's 4th congressional district election
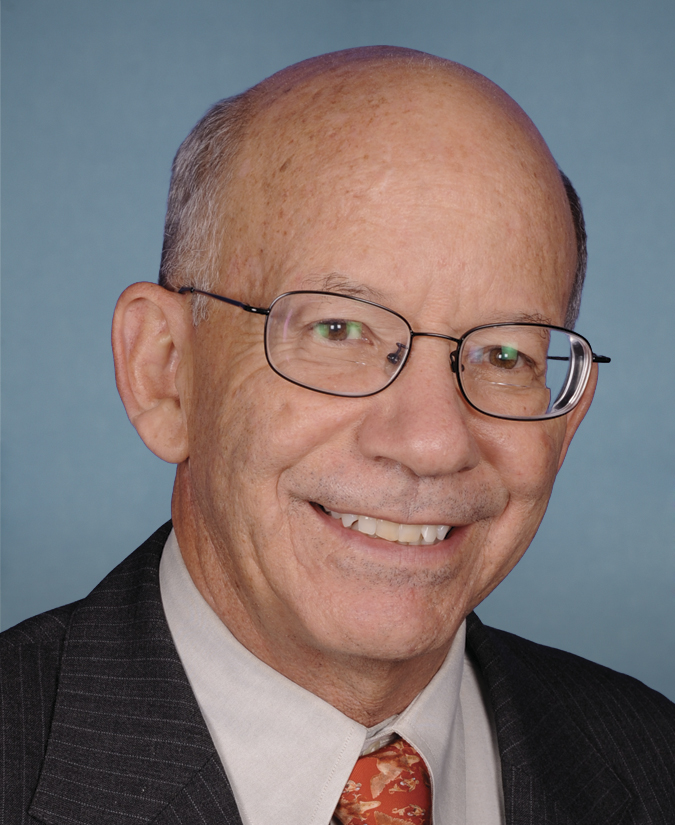

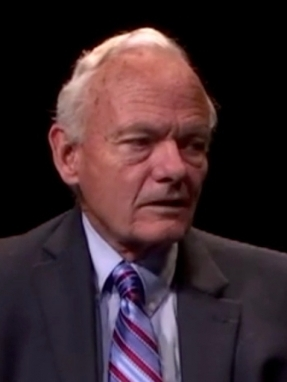
Nominee	Peter A. DeFazio	Arthur B. Robinson
Party	Democratic	Republican
Popular vote	212,866	140,549
Percentage	59.2%	39.0%
- County results Defazio: 50–60% 60–70% 70–80% Robinson: 50–60%
U.S. Representative before election
Peter A. DeFazio
Democratic
Elected U.S. Representative
Peter A. DeFazio
Democratic

Oregon's 4th congressional district has been represented by Democrat Peter DeFazio since 1987 and he is seeking re-election. The district has a PVI of D+2.

=== Democratic primary ===
==== Candidates ====
===== Nominee =====
- Peter DeFazio, incumbent U.S. Representative

===== Eliminated in primary =====
- Matthew Robinson, nuclear engineering graduate student and son of Arthur B. Robinson

==== Results ====
Democratic primary results
Party	Candidate	Votes	%
Democratic	Peter DeFazio (incumbent)	69,864	89.9
Democratic	Matthew Robinson	7,665	9.8
Democratic	Write-ins	212	0.3
Total votes		77,741	100.0

=== Republican primary ===
==== Candidates ====
===== Nominee =====
- Arthur B. Robinson, chemist and nominee for this seat in 2010

==== Results ====
Republican primary results
Party	Candidate	Votes	%
Republican	Art Robinson	50,090	97.3
Republican	Write-ins	1,414	2.7
Total votes		51,504	100.0

=== General election ===
==== Endorsements ====
Arthur Robinson (R)

Organizations

- National Republican Congressional Committee "On the Radar" Program

==== Predictions ====
Source	Ranking	As of
The Cook Political Report	Safe D	November 5, 2012
Rothenberg	Safe D	November 2, 2012
Roll Call	Safe D	November 4, 2012
Sabato's Crystal Ball	Safe D	November 5, 2012
NY Times	Safe D	November 4, 2012
RCP	Safe D	November 4, 2012
The Hill	Safe D	November 4, 2012

==== Results ====
Oregon's 4th congressional district, 2012
Party	Candidate	Votes	%
Democratic	Peter A. DeFazio (incumbent)	212,866	59.2
Republican	Arthur B. Robinson	140,549	39.0
Libertarian	Chuck Huntting	6,205	1.7
n/a	Write-ins	468	0.1
Total votes		360,088	100.0
Democratic hold			

== District 5 ==
2012 Oregon's 5th congressional district election
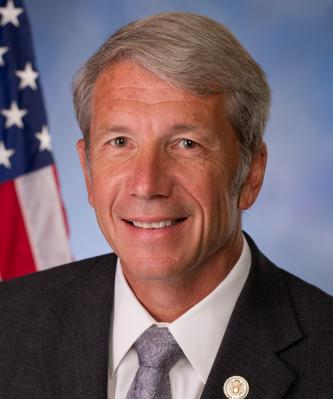

Nominee	Kurt Schrader	Fred Thompson
Party	Democratic	Republican
Popular vote	177,229	139,223
Percentage	54.0%	42.5%
- County results Schrader: 40–50% 50–60% 60–70% Thompson: 50–60%
U.S. Representative before election
Kurt Schrader
Democratic
Elected U.S. Representative
Kurt Schrader
Democratic

Democratic incumbent Kurt Schrader has represented Oregon's 5th congressional district since 2008 and is running for re-election in what is often considered to be the most competitive district in the state. In fact, the district has an even PVI.

=== Democratic primary ===
==== Candidates ====
===== Nominee =====
- Kurt Schrader, incumbent U.S. Representative

==== Primary results ====
Democratic primary results
Party	Candidate	Votes	%
Democratic	Kurt Schrader (incumbent)	51,652	98.5
Democratic	Write-ins	805	1.5
Total votes		52,457	100.0

=== Republican primary ===
==== Candidates ====
===== Nominee =====
- Fred Thompson, retired timber executive and candidate for this seat in 2010

===== Eliminated in primary =====
- Karen Bowerman, business consultant and retired college administrator

===== Declined =====
- Scott Bruun, former state representative and nominee for this seat in 2010
- Chris Dudley, former professional basketball player and nominee for governor in 2010

==== Results ====
Republican primary results
Party	Candidate	Votes	%
Republican	Fred Thompson	33,448	67.0
Republican	Karen Bowerman	16,174	32.4
Republican	Write-ins	320	0.6
Total votes		49,942	100.0

=== General election ===
==== Endorsements ====
Kurt Schrader (D)

Organizations

- Blue Dog Coalition

==== Predictions ====
Source	Ranking	As of
The Cook Political Report	Safe D	November 5, 2012
Rothenberg	Safe D	November 2, 2012
Roll Call	Safe D	November 4, 2012
Sabato's Crystal Ball	Safe D	November 5, 2012
NY Times	Lean D	November 4, 2012
RCP	Safe D	November 4, 2012
The Hill	Likely D	November 4, 2012

==== Results ====
Oregon's 5th congressional district, 2012
Party	Candidate	Votes	%
Democratic	Kurt Schrader (incumbent)	177,229	54.0
Republican	Fred Thompson	139,223	42.5
Pacific Green	Christina Jean Lugo	7,516	2.3
Constitution	Raymond Baldwin	3,600	1.1
n/a	Write-ins	402	0.1
Total votes		327,970	100.0
Democratic hold			

== See also ==
- Oregon's 1st congressional district special election, 2012
- United States House of Representatives elections, 2012
- United States presidential election in Oregon, 2012
- Oregon state elections, 2012
