= Veterinary Medicine Caucus =

- Co-chair: Kurt Schrader DVM (OR-5)
- Co-chair: Dusty Johnson (SD)
- Political position: Bipartisan
- Colors: None Official (Gray Unofficial)
- Field of Focus: Health and Human Services
- Seats in the House: 36 / 435

The Veterinary Medicine Caucus is a congressional caucus within the United States Congress and is officially recognized by the Committee on House Administration.

== Information and purpose ==
According to the caucus's official website and co-chair Kurt Schrader, the purpose of the caucus is to:

"...keep members informed about the opportunities and challenges facing veterinary medicine and help us to increase awareness of the importance of veterinary medicine on research, public health, animal health and welfare, food safety, and our overall economy."

The Caucus was co-chaired by Rep. Kurt Schrader, DVM (OR-5) and Rep. Ted Yoho, DVM (FL-03). Rep. Dusty Johnson from South Dakota co-chaired the caucus with Schrader for the 117th Congress.

The caucus has existed in the United States House of Representatives for five congressional cycles.

== Members ==
Members of the Veterinary Medicine Caucus are ranked based upon their level of seniority in the caucus.

- Co-chair - Kurt Schrader, DVM (D‑OR‑5) Lost renomination in 2022.
- Co-chair - Dusty Johnson (R‑SD‑AL)
- Ann McLane Kuster (D‑NH‑3)
- Rodney Davis (R‑IL‑13) Lost renomination in 2022 due to redistricting.
- Peter DeFazio (D‑OR‑4) Retiring at end of 117th Congress.
- Jim McGovern (D‑MA‑2)
- Mike Rogers (R‑AL‑3)
- Glenn Thompson (R‑PA‑15)
- Suzan DelBene (D‑WA‑1)
- David Joyce (R‑OH‑14)
- Sheila Jackson Lee (D‑TX‑18)
- Vicky Hartzler (R‑MO‑4) Retiring at end of 117th Congress.
- Joe Courtney (D‑CT‑2)
- Mark Pocan (D‑WI‑2)
- Betty McCollum (D‑MN‑4)
- Morgan Griffith (R‑VA‑9)
- David Price (D‑NC‑4) Retiring at end of 117th Congress.
- Jody Hice (R‑GA‑10) Retiring at end of 117th Congress.
- John Garamendi (D‑CA‑3)
- Donald Norcross (D‑NJ‑1)
- Jim Costa (D‑CA‑16)
- Trent Kelly (R‑MS‑1)
- Matt Cartwright (D‑PA‑17)
- Ted Lieu (D‑CA‑33)
- Mike Quigley (D‑IL‑5)
- Bryan Steil (R‑WI‑1)
- Sanford Bishop (D‑GA‑2)
- Susan Wild (D‑PA‑7)
- Ami Bera (D‑CA‑7)
- Jim Baird (R‑IN‑4)
- Troy Balderson (R‑OH‑12)

=== Former members ===
- Fmr. Rep. Lois Capps (D‑CA‑24) - Retired in 2016.
- Fmr. Rep. John Duncan (R‑TN‑2) - Retired in 2018
- Fmr. Rep. Gregg Harper (R‑MS‑3) - Retired in 2018.
- Fmr. Rep. David Jolly (R‑FL‑13)- Lost reelection in 2016.
- Fmr. Rep. Walter Jones (R‑NC‑3) - Died of amyotrophic lateral sclerosis in 2019.
- Fmr. Rep. Cynthia Lummis (R‑WY‑AL) - Retired in 2016.
- Fmr. Rep. Jared Polis (D‑CO‑2) - Elected Governor of Colorado in 2018.
- Fmr. Rep. Peter Roskam (R‑IL‑6) - Lost reelection in 2018.
- Fmr. Rep. Kyrsten Sinema (D‑AZ‑9) - Elected US Senator from Arizona in 2018.
- Fmr. Rep. Kevin Yoder (R‑KS‑3) - Lost reelection in 2018.
- Fmr. Rep. David Young (R‑IA‑3) - Lost reelection in 2018.
- Fmr. Rep. Ralph Abraham, DVM (R‑LA‑5) - Did not run for reelection in 2020.
- Fmr. Rep. Susan Davis (D‑CA‑53) - Did not run for reelection in 2020.
- Fmr. Rep. Bill Flores (R‑TX‑17) - Did not run for reelection in 2020.
- Frm. Rep. Dan Lipinski (D‑IL‑3) - Defeated in 2020 Democratic Primary.
- Fmr Rep. Ted Yoho, DVM (R‑FL‑3) - Did not run for reelection in 2020.
- Frm. Rep. Alcee Hastings (D‑FL‑20) - Died of cancer in January 2021.
- Fmr. Rep. Filemon Vela Jr. (D‑TX‑34) - Resigned in March 2022 to work at Akin Gump.
- Frm. Rep. Jackie Walorski (R‑IN‑2) - Killed in car crash along with two staffers in 2022.
