= Kurt Schrader =

American politician and veterinarian (born 1951)

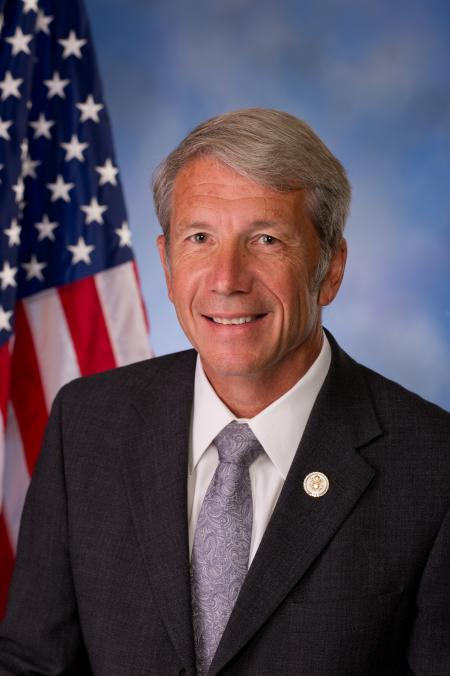
- Official portrait, 2012

Member of the U.S. House of Representatives from Oregon's 5th district
- In office January 3, 2009 – January 3, 2023
- Preceded by: Darlene Hooley
- Succeeded by: Lori Chavez-DeRemer

Member of the Oregon Senate from the 20th district
- In office January 13, 2003 – December 18, 2008
- Preceded by: Verne Duncan
- Succeeded by: Martha Schrader

Member of the Oregon House of Representatives from the 23rd district
- In office January 13, 1997 – January 13, 2003
- Preceded by: Jerry Grisham
- Succeeded by: Wayne Scott

Personal details
- Born: Walter Kurt Schrader; October 19, 1951 (age 74) Bridgeport, Connecticut, U.S.
- Party: Democratic
- Spouses: Martha Northam (m. 1975; div. 2011); Susan Mora (m. 2016)
- Children: 5
- Education: Cornell University (BA); University of Illinois, Urbana-Champaign (BS, DVM)
- Website: House website

Walter Kurt Schrader (born October 19, 1951) is an American politician and veterinarian who served as the U.S. representative for Oregon's 5th congressional district from 2009 to 2023. His district covered most of Oregon's central coast, plus Salem, and many of Portland's southern suburbs, and a sliver of Portland itself. A member of the Democratic Party, Schrader served in both houses of the Oregon Legislative Assembly from 1997 to 2008.

Schrader ran for reelection in 2022. His district had undergone a major change after Oregon gained a seat, moving away from the coast and east of Salem, and taking in a chunk of Deschutes County. Despite his campaign's stronger funding and endorsement from President Joe Biden, Schrader lost renomination to more progressive challenger Jamie McLeod-Skinner, who subsequently lost in the general election to Republican Lori Chavez-DeRemer. Schrader was known as "Manchin of the House" due to him being a conservative Democrat who often broke the party line.

== Early life, education, and early career ==
Schrader was born in Connecticut and received a Bachelor of Arts degree from Cornell University in 1973. At Cornell, Schrader met Martha Northam and the two married in 1975. Schrader earned his Doctor of Veterinary Medicine degree from the University of Illinois in 1977. A year later, the Schraders moved to Oregon, and Kurt opened the Clackamas County Veterinary Clinic in Oregon City.

Schrader served for 16 years on the Canby Planning Commission.

== Oregon legislature ==
=== Elections ===
Schrader served three terms in the Oregon House of Representatives. He first ran for the office in 1994, losing by 38 votes to Republican Jerry Grisham. In 1996, Schrader ran again, defeating Paul Kraxburger. He was reelected in 1998 and 2000.

In 2002, Schrader ran for the Oregon State Senate seat vacated by the retiring Verne Duncan, representing the 20th district in southwestern Clackamas County, including the cities of Barlow, Canby, Gladstone, Johnson City, Oregon City and parts of Milwaukie. He defeated Oregon House member Kathy Lowe in a contentious Democratic primary, then faced no Republican opposition in the general election. His wife, Martha Schrader, was the Democratic nominee to succeed Schrader for his vacant House seat; she lost the general election to Wayne Scott. She then served as a Clackamas County commissioner until 2009, when she was appointed by the same commission (recusing herself from voting) to replace her husband in the State Senate.

=== Committee assignments ===
In the Oregon Senate, Schrader co-chaired the Joint Ways and Means Committee in the 2003 and 2005 sessions and chaired the Interim Joint Legislative Audit Committee in the 2005 session. To prepare for his U.S. House seat, Schrader resigned effective December 17, 2008.

== U.S. House of Representatives ==
=== Elections ===
==== 2008 ====
In May 2008, Schrader won the Democratic nomination for Oregon's 5th congressional district for the seat being vacated by Darlene Hooley. In the general election, he defeated Republican nominee Mike Erickson with 54% of the vote to Erickson's 38%. Schrader won all seven counties in the district.

==== 2010 ====
Schrader was challenged by Republican nominee and Oregon State Representative Scott Bruun and Pacific Green nominee Chris Lugo. Despite several polls showing Bruun ahead and Nate Silver of FiveThirtyEight predicting Schrader would likely lose, Schrader won with 51% of the vote to Bruun's 46%. It was the closest House race in Oregon in 2010, a year in which Republicans picked up at least 63 House seats, but only one on the West Coast.

==== 2012 ====
Schrader was reelected, 54.0% to 42.4%.

==== 2014 ====
Schrader was reelected, 53.7% to 39.3%

==== 2016 ====
Schrader was reelected, 53.5% to 43.0%. He was absent from the Congressional swearing-in on January 3, 2017, because he was on his honeymoon. He was the only member of Congress not to be sworn in that day.

==== 2020 ====
Schrader was reelected, 51.9% to 45.2%. His Republican opponent was Amy Ryan Courser. The Libertarian candidate, Matthew Rix, received 2.8%.

==== 2022 ====
On May 17, 2022, Schrader lost the Democratic primary to Jamie McLeod-Skinner, 56.9% to 42.7%. McLeod-Skinner's victory was largely due to her support in Deschutes County, an area that Schrader had not previously represented. Schrader was the first sitting member of Oregon's Congressional delegation to lose a primary challenge since 1980. Politico characterized Schrader's loss as resulting from progressive backlash against aspects of his voting record. They noted that Schrader was endorsed by Joe Biden and received support from two outside groups associated with moderates. Commentary from The Wall Street Journal's editorial page, which called Schrader "Oregon's Joe Manchin", said that his loss was an example of how endangered conservative Democrats had become.

=== Tenure ===
During his tenure in the House, Schrader was considered a moderate to conservative Democrat.

Schrader was ranked the 50th-most bipartisan House member during the 114th United States Congress (and the most bipartisan House member from Oregon) by The Lugar Center and McCourt School of Public Policy's Bipartisan Index, which ranks members of Congress by measuring how often their bills attract co-sponsors from the opposite party and how often they co-sponsor bills by members of the opposite party. As of March 2022, Schrader had voted in line with Joe Biden's stated position 96.4% of the time.

In December 2016, Schrader criticized Nancy Pelosi's election as Minority Leader, saying, "I'm very worried we just signed the Democratic Party's death certificate for the next decade and a half". The Democratic Party won control of the House of Representatives in 2018, and Pelosi served as Speaker from 2019 until 2023, when the Republican Party won control of the House of Representatives in 2022.

After the 2021 United States Capitol attack, Schrader called possible impeachment proceedings against Donald Trump a "lynching." One of Oregon's top political consultants announced he would no longer work with Schrader due to the comment. Schrader later apologized for his comments and supported the second impeachment of Donald Trump.

==== Abortion ====
In May 2012, Schrader voted against the Prenatal Nondiscrimination Act of 2012, introduced by Representative Trent Franks. The bill proposed criminal penalties for giving abortions in special cases, notably when based on gender, race or color of the child or parent.

==== Health care ====
Schrader supports the Affordable Care Act. He and former Representative Allyson Schwartz co-chaired the New Dem Health Care Task Force, which set forth an agenda of "more effectively implementing health care policy in this country that improves payment and delivery systems."

In July 2017, Schrader led a group of ten House Democrats who proposed to augment Obamacare with a $15 billion "annual reinsurance fund to pay health insurers that enroll higher-cost, sicker individuals."

In September 2021, Schrader, Scott Peters, and Kathleen Rice opposed allowing Medicare to negotiate drug prices except in a small subset of cases. Schrader's opposition was characterized as a threat to the passing of President Biden’s social and environmental infrastructure package. Advocacy groups have criticized Schrader for "doing the backroom bidding of Big Pharma" because he has received $614,830 from the pharmaceutical industry since he became a Congressman, $144,252 of it during the 2020 election cycle. He has denied that these donations influenced his vote, saying he opposed the bill because he thinks it could not pass the Senate and that he is working on a different bill that he thinks will get more support.

==== Agriculture and veterinary medicine ====
In March 2017, Schrader told a district audience that the Trump administration seemed determined to deregulate agriculture. He said that agriculture regulations "were a bit of an overreach", causing problems for both dairy and dirt farmers.

Schrader coauthored the Veterinary Medicine Mobility Act of 2014 (H.R. 1528; 113th Congress), a bill that would amend the Controlled Substances Act to clarify that veterinarians are not required to have separate registrations to dispense controlled substances outside of their principal place of business, such as when treating animals on a farm.

==== Gun control ====
In December 2017, Schrader was one of only six House Democrats to support legislation allowing concealed handgun licensees to carry their weapons in all 50 states.

On June 8, 2022, Schrader voted against the Protecting Our Kids Act, gun safety legislation the House passed in the wake of the May 2022, Robb Elementary School shooting. He was one of only two Democrats to vote against the bill, which would raise the age for purchasing semi-automatic weapons from 18 to 21, limit ammunition magazine size, and require safe storage of guns and ammunition with penalties and/or liability for non-compliance.

On July 29, 2022, Schrader and four other Democrats joined the Republicans in voting against a bill banning assault weapons.

==== COVID relief ====
In February 2021, Schrader was one of two House Democrats to vote against the American Rescue Plan Act of 2021. He said he voted against it because he felt there had been "no legislative process." He previously voted against increasing stimulus check payments to $2,000.

==== Minimum wage ====
In July 2019, Schrader was one of six House Democrats to oppose a bill that would incrementally increase the federal minimum wage from $7.25 to $15 an hour by 2025.

==== Infrastructure ====
In August 2021, Schrader joined a group of conservative Democrats, dubbed "The Unbreakable Nine", who threatened to derail the Biden administration's $3.5 trillion budget reconciliation package meant to tackle the nation's infrastructure.

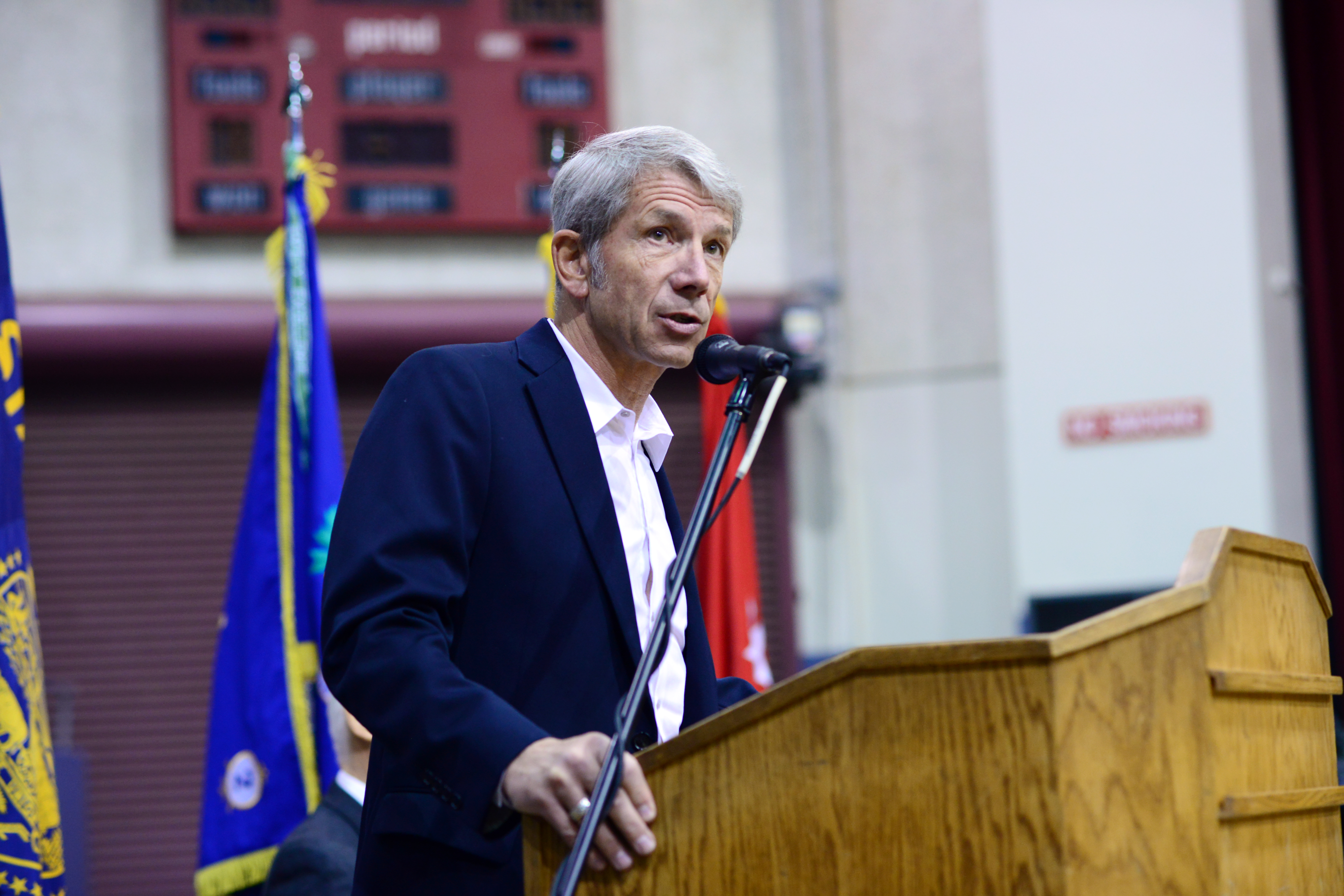
Schrader speaking to members of the Oregon Army National Guard, 2017

=== Committee assignments ===
- United States House Committee on Energy and Commerce
  - House Subcommittee on Health
  - House Subcommittee on Energy

=== Caucus memberships ===
- Veterinary Medicine Caucus (co-chair)
- Problem Solvers Caucus
- Congressional Task Force on Down Syndrome
- Congressional Diabetes Caucus
- Democratic Caucus Seniors Task Force
- Public Education Caucus
- Career & Technical Education Caucus
- Congressional Arts Caucus
- Congressional Ports Caucus
- Congressional Native American Caucus
- House Paper and Packaging Caucus (co-chair)
- General Aviation Caucus
- Congressional Beef Caucus
- Congressional Franchise Caucus
- Congressional Taiwan Caucus
- Singapore Caucus
- Blue Dog Coalition
- New Democrat Coalition
- Congressional Western Caucus

== Later career ==
After leaving Congress, Schrader joined Washington, D.C. lobbying firm Williams and Jensen.

== Electoral history ==
Oregon's 5th congressional district: Results 2008–2020
Year	Democratic	Votes	Pct		Republican	Votes	Pct		3rd Party	Party	Votes	Pct		3rd Party	Party	Votes	Pct	3rd Party	Party	Votes	Pct	3rd Party	Party	Votes	Pct	3rd Party	Party	Votes	Pct
2008	Kurt Schrader	181,577	54.3%		Mike Erickson	128,297	38.3%		Sean Bates	Independent	6,830	2.0%		Douglas Patterson	Constitution	6,558	2.0%	Alex Polikoff	Pacific Green	5,272	1.6%	Steve Milligan	Libertarian	4,814	1.4%	Write-ins		1,326	<1.0%
2010	Kurt Schrader	145,319	51.2%		Scott Bruun	130,313	46.0%	*	Chris Lugo	Pacific Green	7,557	2.7%	*	Write-ins		367	<1.0%												
2012	Kurt Schrader	177,229	54.0%		Fred Thompson	139,223	42.4%		Christina Jean Lugo	Pacific Green	7,516	2.3%		Raymond Baldwin	Constitution	3,600	1.1%	Write-ins		402	<1.0%								
2014	Kurt Schrader	150,944	53.7%		Tootie Smith	110,332	39.3%		Marvin Sandnes	Independent	7,674	2.7%		Raymond Baldwin	Constitution	6,208	2.2%	Daniel K. Souza	Libertarian	5,198	1.8%	Write-ins		732	<1.0%				
2016	Kurt Schrader	199,505	53.5%	**	Colm Willis	160,443	43.0%		Marvin Sandnes	Pacific Green	12,542	3.4%		Write-ins		618	<1.0%												
2018	Kurt Schrader	197,187	55.0%	**	Mark Callahan	149,887	41.8%		Daniel K. Souza	Libertarian	6,054	1.7%		Marvin Sandnes	Pacific Green	4,802	1.3%	Write-ins		539	<1.0%								
2020	Kurt Schrader	234,863	51.9%		Amy Ryan Courser	204,372	45.1%		Matthew Rix	Libertarian	12,640	2.8%		Write-ins		771	<1.0%												

* In the 2010 election, Scott Bruun was co-nominated by the Oregon Independent Party and Chris Lugo was co-nominated by the Oregon Progressive Party.
** In the 2016 and 2018 elections, Kurt Schrader was co-nominated by the Oregon Independent Party.

== Personal life ==
Schrader and former Oregon state senator Martha Schrader divorced in 2011. He has five children. On December 31, 2016, Schrader married former Pepco lobbyist Susan Mora. He is an Episcopalian.

Schrader's residence is the Kraft-Brandes-Culberston Farmstead in Canby, also known as Three Rivers Farm, which is listed on the National Register of Historic Places.

U.S. House of Representatives
Preceded by Darlene Hooley	Member of the U.S. House of Representatives from Oregon's 5th congressional district 2009–2023	Succeeded by Lori Chavez-DeRemer
Party political offices
New office	Democratic Co-Chair of the Problem Solvers Caucus; 2013–2017; Served alongside: Reid Ribble, Tom Reed	Succeeded by Josh Gottheimer
Preceded by Mike Ross	Chair of the Blue Dog Coalition for Communications; 2013–2015; Served alongside: John Barrow (Administration), Jim Cooper (Policy)	Succeeded by Jim Costa
Preceded by John Barrow	Chair of the Blue Dog Coalition for Administration; 2015–2017; Served alongside: Jim Costa (Communications), Jim Cooper (Policy)	Succeeded by Jim Costa
U.S. order of precedence (ceremonial)
Preceded by John Kline as Former U.S. Representative	Order of precedence of the United States as Former U.S. Representative	Succeeded by Shelley Berkley as Former U.S. Representative
