= Art Robinson =

American politician

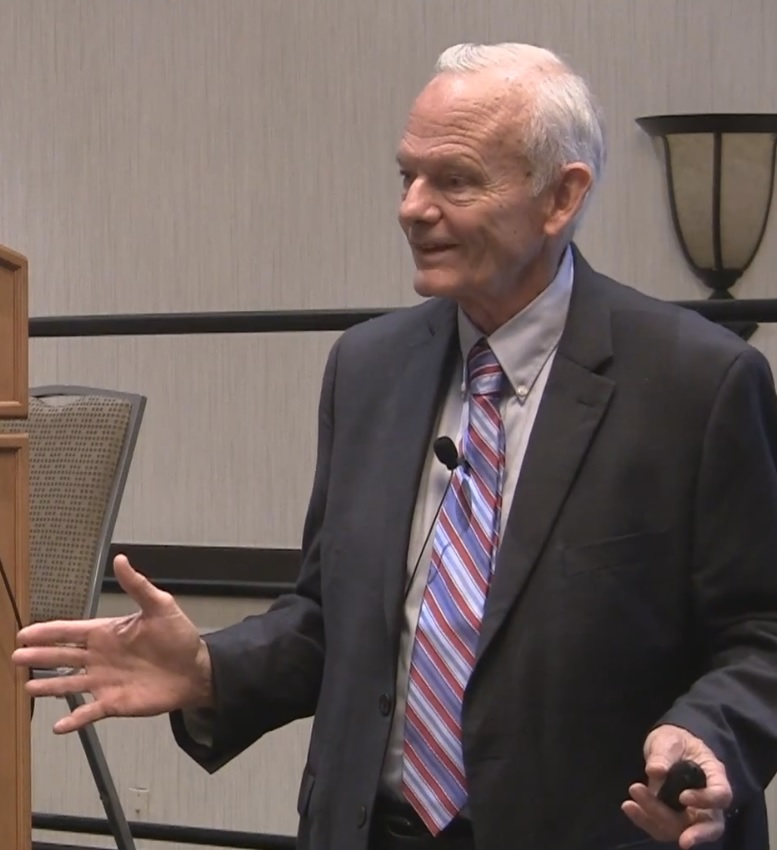

Member of the Oregon State Senate from the 2nd district
- In office January 11, 2021 – January 13, 2025
- Preceded by: Herman Baertschiger
- Succeeded by: Noah Robinson

Chair of the Oregon Republican Party
- In office August 10, 2013 – February 28, 2015
- Preceded by: Suzanne Gallagher
- Succeeded by: Bill Currier

Personal details
- Born: March 24, 1942 (age 84) Chicago, Illinois, US
- Party: Republican
- Other political affiliations: Ind. Republican (Since 2021)
- Spouse: Laurelee Robinson (d. 1988)
- Education: California Institute of Technology (BS); University of California, San Diego (PhD)
- Website: Campaign website
- Scientific career
- Fields: Biochemistry
- Workplaces: University of California, San Diego
- Thesis: Experiments on the synthesis and spectral characterization of cytochrome-related molecules (1967)
- Doctoral advisor: Martin Kamen

Arthur Brouhard Robinson (born March 24, 1942) is an American biochemist, conservative activist, prominent climate change denier, and politician who served as the Oregon State Senator from the 2nd District from 2021 to 2025. He was the five-time Republican nominee for the United States House of Representatives for Oregon's 4th congressional district.

A former faculty member of the University of California, San Diego, Robinson now runs a privately funded laboratory known as the Oregon Institute of Science and Medicine in Cave Junction, Oregon, a newsletter called Access to Energy, and publishes the Robinson Self-Teaching Home School Curriculum.

As the Republican nominee for the Fourth District in Oregon, Robinson ran and lost to Democratic incumbent Peter DeFazio in five consecutive elections: 2010, 2012, 2014, 2016, and 2018. He served as chairman of the Oregon Republican Party from August 2013 to February 2015.

== Early life and education ==
Robinson was born in Chicago. He received a BS in chemistry from the California Institute of Technology (Caltech) in 1963, and a PhD in biochemistry from the University of California, San Diego in 1968. His doctoral thesis was titled, Experiments on the synthesis and spectral characterization of cytochrome-related molecules.

== Scientific career ==
=== Early career ===
Robinson was one of the few students ever to be appointed to the faculty of the University of California, San Diego immediately after getting his Ph.D., but resigned four years later.

He was a co-founder, along with Linus Pauling and Keene Dimick, of the Institute of Orthomolecular Medicine, later renamed the Linus Pauling Institute in 1973.

=== Linus Pauling Institute ===
Robinson was the president, director, and a research professor with tenure at the institute.

In June 1978, Robinson was asked to consult with the Executive Committee of the Linus Pauling Institute regarding important decisions involving the Institute. The members of the Executive Committee included Robinson, Pauling, and Executive Vice President Richard Hicks. The same day Robinson was asked to consult, he (Robinson) dismissed Hicks by terminating the fund raising services agreement employing Hicks, claiming that Hicks had failed to generate the substantial donations expected of him.

Disturbed by Robinson's swift actions against Hicks, Pauling declared that he no longer had "trust and confidence in Robinson", and asked him to resign immediately. Robinson requested thirty days to consider the resignation and ultimately refused. Pauling called a meeting of the board of trustees regarding Robinson's refusal to resign. The board granted Robinson a leave of absence, and passed all executive authority to Pauling, later electing him president and director of the institute.

==== Lawsuit ====
Robinson responded to the dismissal by charging that he, not Pauling, had done the experimental work at the institute, and that "Linus has not personally contributed significant research work on vitamin C and human health". Robinson filed a lawsuit against the Institute for $25.5 million, finally settling for $575,000.

=== Oregon Institute of Science and Medicine ===
Robinson later moved to Oregon and founded the Oregon Institute of Science and Medicine (OISM) there in 1980.

Robinson is the president of the OISM, which is a 501(c)(3) non-profit organization located in Cave Junction, Oregon. The OISM's mission statement and purpose is, "research, development, and public education on the biochemistry of molecular clocks and the degenerative diseases of aging, elementary science education, the effects of environment on health and welfare, and disaster preparedness". The institute faculty has included Salk Institute biochemist Fred Westall, the late Nobel Prize-winning biochemist Robert Bruce Merrifield, and the late Manhattan Project physicist Martin Kamen.

The OISM website states that "several members of the Institute's staff are also well known for their work on the Petition Project" (the Oregon Petition), and that the petition has "more than 31,000" signatures by scientists. Robinson asserted in 2008 that the petition has over 31,000 signatories, with 9,000 of these holding a PhD degree. Most signatories with a PhD hold their degree in engineering. The 2009 report of the Nongovernmental International Panel on Climate Change (NIPCC)—a group that "disputes the reality of man-made climate change"—lists 31,478 degreed signatories, including 9,029 with PhDs. The list has been criticized for its lack of verification, with pranksters successfully submitting the names of Charles Darwin, a member of the Spice Girls and characters from Star Wars, and getting them briefly included on the list. A recent revisiting of his report found his chart analysis to be inaccurate when updated with recent years' data.

According to Bloomberg.com, starting in about 2013 Robinson began collecting "thousands of vials of human urine" which he claims hold "the key to extending the human life span and wresting control of medicine from what he calls the 'medical-industrial-government complex'." As of early 2016, there were 14,000 urine samples stored in freezers at the OISM lab. According to Zachary Mider of Bloomberg, it is "hard to judge the credibility" of Robinson's claims. Although Robinson earned a Ph.D. from the University of California, San Diego in the 1960s, "he hasn't published peer-reviewed research on diagnostic medicine in decades." In reply Robinson stated, "we've completed experiments here, which we could easily publish, but we want to wait until they are perfect."

In his monthly newsletter "Access to Energy", Robinson has reported on experiments showing that ionizing radiation can be good for you, advocates for a revival of cheap nuclear power, attacks climate science as a "false religion" that will enslave mankind, and condemns public education, instead favoring home schooling. "Access to Energy" was originated by Petr Beckmann; Robinson began writing it with the September 1993 issue.

OISM also publishes material relating to civil defense and disaster preparedness.

== Political career ==
=== 2010 congressional election ===
In May 2010, Robinson won the Republican primary for Oregon's 4th congressional district, taking 79% of the vote to businesswoman Jaynee Germond's 20%. He faced Democratic incumbent Peter DeFazio in the November 2010 general election. Six weeks before the election, $600,000 worth of TV advertisements started to appear in the district, portraying his opponent as "a puppet of the Democratic leadership". It was later revealed that the advertisements, reportedly a surprise to Robinson, were paid for by conservative billionaire hedge fund manager Robert Mercer. (Mercer provided "six-figure financial support" to Robinson again in 2012 and 2014.) Robinson was defeated by 145,091 votes (53.6%) to 120,307 (44.5%) but it was the "best performance" by a Republican in the district "in decades". Robinson vowed to try again in 2012.

=== 2012 congressional election ===
Robinson, running unopposed, became the Republican nominee for Oregon's 4th congressional district, to again face incumbent DeFazio, who had defeated Robinson's son Matthew in a landslide in the Democratic primary. In the general election, DeFazio defeated Robinson by 212,866 votes (59.1%) to 140,549 (39%).

=== 2014 congressional election ===
Robinson ran for a third time for Oregon's 4th congressional district in 2014. He was unopposed in the Republican primary and faced another rematch in the general election with DeFazio, who was unopposed in the Democratic primary. Robinson lost the election with 116,534 votes to DeFazio's 181,624.

=== 2016 congressional election ===
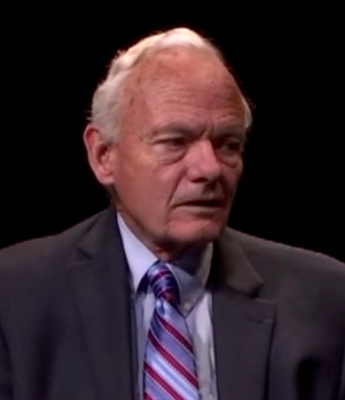
Robinson in 2016

Robinson ran for a fourth time for Oregon's 4th congressional district in 2016. He ran against Jo Rae Perkins, a former Linn County Republican party chairwoman, in the primary election and won with 67 percent of the vote. In the general election on November 8. Robinson once again faced DeFazio, who won his primary election with 93 percent of the vote. DeFazio prevailed once more, 55%-40%.

=== 2018 congressional election ===
Robinson challenged DeFazio for a fifth time in Oregon's 4th congressional district. He faced four primary challengers this time, Perkins, again, plus former Eugene mayoral candidate Stefan Strek, Curry County Commissioner Court Boice, and Michael Polen. Robinson won the nomination with 45.7% of the vote. DeFazio defeated Robinson 56%-41%.

=== 2020 State senate election ===
Robinson filed to run once again against DeFazio but dropped out on the final day of the registration period to run for Oregon State Senate District 2, instead, to replace retiring Republican incumbent Herman Baertschiger Jr. Robinson defeated his Democratic challenger, Jerry Allen, with 64.01% to 33.52%.

=== Political positions ===
In addition to asserting that global warming is a hoax, Robinson opposes abortion and supports gun rights, cutting taxes, increasing border security and building new power plants. He argues for balancing the federal budget, defunding earmarks and ending special-interest influence in Washington. He also supports ending the Federal Reserve System. Robinson is against bailouts to Wall Street banks. He also supports a strong national defense, but with a more restrained foreign policy. Robinson is a signatory to A Scientific Dissent from Darwinism, a petition circulated by the Discovery Institute to promote the pseudoscientific intelligent design theory.

=== Oregon State University controversy ===
In 2011, Robinson alleged that Oregon State University (OSU) was part of a conspiracy to retaliate against him for his political activism by expelling his three children, all of whom were graduate students there. When asked what proof he has of the university discriminating against his children, Robinson stated, "I don't have definitive proof, [...] That is what I believe. Basically, I know what happened. I cannot tell you the motives of the people doing it." In a statement, OSU would not comment on matters concerning the students without their consent, but declared all the other claims, including those about the faculty, to be unfounded.

=== 2023 unexcused absences ===
While participating in a Republican-led walkout in May 2023 Robinson reached the 10 unexcused absence threshold set by measure 113, disqualifying him from running for reelection after his current term ends. In October the Oregon Supreme Court agreed to hear a challenge to the measure. On February 1, 2024, the Court unanimously ruled against the Republican Senators, confirming Robinson's disqualification after the end of his term in January 2025. Robinson was succeeded in the Senate by his son, Noah Robinson.

== Personal life ==
Robinson is a non-denominational Christian and lives in Cave Junction, Oregon. He was married to Laurelee Robinson until her death in 1988. His six children were all home schooled. As a hobby, Robinson buys unwanted pipe organs from churches and reassembles them on his property. Among the instruments in his collection is the organ formerly owned by famed Christian Gospel singer George Beverly Shea.

== Electoral history ==
2010 US House of Representatives, Oregon's 4th congressional district
Party	Candidate	Votes	%
Democratic	Peter DeFazio	162,416	54.5
Republican	Art Robinson	129,877	43.6
Pacific Green	Mike Beilstein	5,215	1.7
Write-in		544	0.2
Total votes		298,052	100%

2012 US House of Representatives, Oregon's 4th congressional district
Party	Candidate	Votes	%
Democratic	Peter DeFazio	212,866	59.1
Republican	Art Robinson	140,549	39.0
Libertarian	Chuck Huntting	6,205	1.7
Write-in		468	0.1
Total votes		360,088	100%

2014 US House of Representatives, Oregon's 4th congressional district
Party	Candidate	Votes	%
Democratic	Peter DeFazio	181,624	58.6
Republican	Art Robinson	116,534	37.6
Pacific Green	Mike Beilstein	6,863	2.2
Libertarian	David L Chester	4,676	1.5
Write-in		482	0.2
Total votes		310,179	100%

2016 US House of Representatives, Oregon's 4th congressional district
Party	Candidate	Votes	%
Democratic	Peter DeFazio	220,628	55.5
Republican	Art Robinson	157,743	39.7
Pacific Green	Mike Beilstein	12,194	3.1
Libertarian	Gil Guthrie	6,527	1.6
Write-in		476	0.1
Total votes		397,568	100%

2018 US House of Representatives, Oregon's 4th congressional district
Party	Candidate	Votes	%
Democratic	Peter DeFazio	208,710	56.0
Republican	Art Robinson	152,414	40.9
Pacific Green	Mike Beilstein	5,956	1.6
Libertarian	Richard R Jacobson	5,370	1.4
Write-in		443	0.1
Total votes		372,893	100%

2020 Oregon State Senator, 2nd district
Party	Candidate	Votes	%
Republican	Art Robinson	48,627	63.9
Democratic	Jerry Allen	25,559	33.6
Libertarian	Thomas Griffin	1,792	2.4
Write-in		124	0.2
Total votes		76,102	100%

== Selected publications ==
- Robinson, Arthur B.; McKerrow, James H.; Cary, Paul (1970). "Controlled Deamidation of Peptides and Proteins: An Experimental Hazard and a Possible Biological Timer". PNAS. 66 (3): 753–757. Bibcode:1970PNAS...66..753R. doi:10.1073/pnas.66.3.753. PMC 283114. PMID 5269237.
- Pauling, Linus; Robinson, Arthur B.; Teranishi, Roy; Cary, Paul (1971). "Quantitative Analysis of Urine Vapor and Breath by Gas-Liquid Partition Chromatography". PNAS. 68 (10): 2374–2376. Bibcode:1971PNAS...68.2374P. doi:10.1073/pnas.68.10.2374. PMC 426616. PMID 5289873.
- Robinson, Arthur B.; Robinson, Laurelee R. (1991). "Distribution of glutamine and asparagine residues and their near neighbors in peptides and proteins". PNAS. 88 (20): 8880–8884. Bibcode:1991PNAS...88.8880R. doi:10.1073/pnas.88.20.8880. PMC 52614. PMID 1924347.
- Soon, Willie H.; Baliunas, Sallie L.; Robinson, Arthur B.; Robinson, Zachary W. (1999). "Environmental effects of increased atmospheric carbon dioxide". Climate Research. 13 (2): 149–164. Bibcode:1999ClRes..13..149S. doi:10.3354/cr013149.
- Robinson, Noah E.; Robinson, Arthur B. (2001). "Molecular clocks". PNAS. 98 (3): 944–949. Bibcode:2001PNAS...98..944R. doi:10.1073/pnas.98.3.944. PMC 14689. PMID 11158575.
- Robinson, Arthur B.; Robinson, Noah E. (2008). "Use of Merrifield solid phase peptide synthesis in investigations of biological deamidation of peptides and proteins". Peptide Science. 90 (3): 297–306. doi:10.1002/bip.20852. PMID 17896348. S2CID 35618789.

Party political offices
Preceded by Suzanne Gallagher	Chair of the Oregon Republican Party; 2013–2015	Succeeded by Bill Currier
