= Jerry Grisham =

American politician

Member of the Oregon House of Representatives from the 23rd district
- In office ???–1997
- Succeeded by: Kurt Schrader

Personal details
- Born: December 1, 1941 Oregon City, Oregon, U.S.
- Died: April 21, 2015 (aged 73)
- Party: Republican
- Spouse: Susan Grisham
- Children: 2

Jerry Grisham (December 1, 1941 – April 21, 2015) was an American politician. He served as a Republican member for the 23rd district of the Oregon House of Representatives.

== Life and career ==
Grisham was born in Oregon City, Oregon, the son of Laura and Clifford Grisham. After high school, he joined the United States Air Force and served as an honor guard stationed at Bolling Air Force Base.

Grisham was a member of the Oregon House of Representatives, representing the 23rd district until 1997, when he was succeeded by Kurt Schrader. The next year, he was a candidate for the 14th district of the Oregon State Senate, losing against Rick Metsger.

Grisham died in April 2015 of cancer, at the age of 73.
