= Scott Bruun =

American politician

Member of the Oregon House of Representatives from the 37th district
- In office 2005–2011
- Preceded by: Randy Miller
- Succeeded by: Julie Parrish

Personal details
- Born: Lorentz Scott Bruun; May 3, 1966 (age 60) Portland, Oregon
- Party: Republican
- Spouse: Alison
- Profession: Business executive

Lorentz Scott Bruun (/ˈbruːɪn/ BROO-in; born May 3, 1966) is an American Republican politician from the US state of Oregon. He served in the Oregon House of Representatives representing District 37, which encompasses some of the southern suburbs of Portland, Oregon, including part or all of the cities of Durham, Lake Oswego, Rivergrove, Tualatin and West Linn, as well as the hamlet of Stafford and parts of unincorporated Clackamas County. Bruun did not seek re-election in 2010 and was the Republican nominee for Oregon's 5th congressional district in 2010, losing to incumbent Democrat Kurt Schrader.

== Early life and career ==
Bruun grew up in Portland, Oregon and graduated from Lincoln High School. He earned a bachelor's degree in political science from the University of Oregon in 1988 and an MBA from Portland State University in 1992. He worked as a commercial and corporate banker for more than ten years before joining his family's general contracting company Lorentz Bruun as vice president and chief financial officer.

== Political campaigns ==
=== 1996 ===
In April 1996, Bruun sought the Republican nomination for a special election to complete the term for the United States House of Representatives seat in Oregon's 3rd congressional district, vacated when Ron Wyden won election to the United States Senate. Bruun lost the Republican primary to Mark Brunelle, who then lost the special election to Earl Blumenauer. However, Bruun was unopposed for the Republican nomination for the November election for the full term because Brunelle failed to register for the May primary. Blumenauer went on to defeat Bruun to win re-election to the seat.

=== 2004, 2006, 2008 ===
In 2004, Bruun won a close election for a vacant seat in the Oregon House of Representatives over Jim Morton. He was re-elected in 2006, and again in 2008, facing Democratic West Linn city councilor Michele Eberle.

=== 2010 ===
Bruun unsuccessfully challenged Democratic incumbent Kurt Schrader for a seat in the House of Representatives in Oregon's 5th congressional district. In May 2010, Bruun won the Republican nomination against Fred Thompson.

== After politics ==
Since 2024, Bruun has served as president and CEO of the Oregon Bankers Association.

== Electoral history ==
2004 Oregon State Representative, 37th district
Party	Candidate	Votes	%
Republican	Scott Bruun	15,652	52.1
Democratic	Jim Morton	13,289	44.2
Libertarian	Marc L. Delphine	563	1.9
Progressive	Curtis Sommer	509	1.7
Write-in		35	0.1
Total votes		30,048	100%

2006 Oregon State Representative, 37th district
Party	Candidate	Votes	%
Republican	Scott Bruun	12,531	53.3
Democratic	Bev Backa	10,461	44.5
Libertarian	David M. Akin	507	2.2
Write-in		20	0.1
Total votes		23,519	100%

2008 Oregon State Representative, 37th district
Party	Candidate	Votes	%
Republican	Scott Bruun	16,097	53.5
Democratic	Michele Eberle	13,935	46.3
Write-in		68	0.2
Total votes		30,100	100%

2010 US House of Representatives, Oregon's 5th congressional district
Party	Candidate	Votes	%
Democratic	Kurt Schrader	145,319	51.2
Republican	Scott Bruun	130,313	46.0
Pacific Green	Chris Lugo	7,557	2.7
Write-in		367	0.1
Total votes		283,556	100%
