= Oregon's 4th congressional district =

U.S. House district for Oregon

Coordinates: 43°30′N 123°30′W

- Interactive map of district boundaries since January 3, 2023
- Representative: Val Hoyle; D–Springfield
- Area: 17,181 mi^{2} (44,500 km^{2})
- Distribution: 69.17% urban; 30.83% rural
- Population (2025): 705,908
- Median household income: $70,842
- Ethnicity: 79.0% White; 8.9% Hispanic; 6.6% Two or more races; 2.6% Asian; 1.2% Native American; 0.9% Black; 0.8% other
- Occupation: 55.2% White-collar; 28.2% Blue-collar; 16.5% Gray-collar
- Cook PVI: D+6

Oregon's 4th congressional district represents the southern half of Oregon's coastal counties, including Coos, Curry, Lincoln, Lane, and Benton counties, alongside the northwestern half of Douglas County and a sliver of Linn County. It is centered around the state's two college towns, Eugene and Corvallis, homes to the University of Oregon and Oregon State University, respectively. Politically, the district leans slightly Democratic, due to the presence of Lane and Benton counties, home to over half the district's population. Lincoln County also tilts Democratic. Contrariwise, Douglas County is heavily Republican, as are to a lesser extent Coos and Curry. The district has been represented by Democrat Val Hoyle since 2023.

== Composition ==
For the 118th and successive Congresses (based on redistricting following the 2020 census), the district contains all or portions of the following counties and communities:

Benton County (11)

All 11 communities

Coos County (11)

All 11 communities

Curry County (8)

All 8 communities

Douglas County (17)

Dillard, Drain, Elkton, Fair Oaks, Gardiner, Glide, Green, Lookingglass, Melrose, Oakland, Reedsport, Roseburg, Roseburg North, Sutherlin, Winchester Bay, Winston, Yoncalla

Lane County (22)

All 22 communities

Lincoln County (12)

All 12 communities

Linn County (0)

No incorporated or census-recognized communities

== List of members representing the district ==
Member (District home)	Party	Term	Cong ress	Electoral history
District established January 3, 1943
Harris Ellsworth (Roseburg)	Republican	January 3, 1943 – January 3, 1957	78th 79th 80th 81st 82nd 83rd 84th	Elected in 1942. Re-elected in 1944. Re-elected in 1946. Re-elected in 1948. Re-elected in 1950. Re-elected in 1952. Re-elected in 1954. Lost re-election.
Charles O. Porter (Eugene)	Democratic	January 3, 1957 – January 3, 1961	85th 86th	Elected in 1956. Re-elected in 1958. Lost re-election.
Edwin R. Durno (Medford)	Republican	January 3, 1961 – January 3, 1963	87th	Elected in 1960. Retired to run for U.S. senator.
Robert B. Duncan (Medford)	Democratic	January 3, 1963 – January 3, 1967	88th 89th	Elected in 1962. Re-elected in 1964. Retired to run for U.S. senator.
John R. Dellenback (Medford)	Republican	January 3, 1967 – January 3, 1975	90th 91st 92nd 93rd	Elected in 1966. Re-elected in 1968. Re-elected in 1970. Re-elected in 1972. Lost re-election.
James H. Weaver (Eugene)	Democratic	January 3, 1975 – January 3, 1987	94th 95th 96th 97th 98th 99th	Elected in 1974. Re-elected in 1976. Re-elected in 1978. Re-elected in 1980. Re-elected in 1982. Re-elected in 1984. Retired to run for U.S. senator.
Peter DeFazio (Springfield)	Democratic	January 3, 1987 – January 3, 2023	100th 101st 102nd 103rd 104th 105th 106th 107th 108th 109th 110th 111th 112th 113th 114th 115th 116th 117th	Elected in 1986. Re-elected in 1988. Re-elected in 1990. Re-elected in 1992. Re-elected in 1994. Re-elected in 1996. Re-elected in 1998. Re-elected in 2000. Re-elected in 2002. Re-elected in 2004. Re-elected in 2006. Re-elected in 2008. Re-elected in 2010. Re-elected in 2012. Re-elected in 2014. Re-elected in 2016. Re-elected in 2018. Re-elected in 2020. Retired.
Val Hoyle (Springfield)	Democratic	January 3, 2023 – present	118th 119th	Elected in 2022. Re-elected in 2024. Re-elected in 2026.

== Recent election results from statewide races ==
Year	Office	Results
2008	President	Obama 58% - 40%
2012	President	Obama 57% - 43%
2016	President	Clinton 48% - 40%
2016	Senate	Wyden 55% - 35%
2016	Governor (Spec.)	Brown 51% - 43%
2016	Attorney General	Rosenblum 54% - 42%
2018	Governor	Brown 49% - 43%
2020	President	Biden 55% - 42%
2020	Senate	Merkley 56% - 40%
2020	Secretary of State	Fagan 49% - 45%
2020	Treasurer	Read 51% - 42%
2020	Attorney General	Rosenblum 55% - 43%
2022	Senate	Wyden 55% - 41%
2022	Governor	Kotek 46% - 44%
2024	President	Harris 54% - 42%
2024	Secretary of State	Read 54% - 43%
2024	Treasurer	Steiner 49% - 44%
2024	Attorney General	Rayfield 54% - 46%

== Election results ==
Sources (official results only):

- Elections History from the Oregon Secretary of State website
- Election Statistics from the website of the Clerk of the United States House of Representatives

=== 1994 ===
United States House election, 1994: Oregon District 4
Party	Candidate	Votes	%
Democratic	Peter DeFazio (incumbent)	158,981	66.76%
Republican	John D. Newkirk	78,947	33.15%
Misc.	Misc.	221	0.09%
Total votes		238,149	100
Democratic hold			

=== 1996 ===
United States House election, 1996: Oregon District 4
Party	Candidate	Votes	%
Democratic	Peter DeFazio (incumbent)	177,270	65.69%
Republican	John D. Newkirk	76,649	28.40%
Libertarian	Tonie Nathan	4,919	1.82%
Reform	Bill Bonville	3,960	1.47%
Socialist	David Duemler	1,373	0.51%
Peace and Freedom	Alan Opus	1,311	0.49%
Misc.	Misc.	4,374	1.62%
Total votes		269,856	100
Democratic hold			

=== 1998 ===
United States House election, 1998: Oregon District 4
Party	Candidate	Votes	%
Democratic	Peter DeFazio (incumbent)	157,524	70.12%
Republican	Steve J. Webb	64,143	28.55%
Socialist	Karl G. Sorg	2,694	1.20%
Misc.	Misc.	276	0.12%
Total votes		224,637	100
Democratic hold			

=== 2000 ===
United States House election, 2000: Oregon District 4
Party	Candidate	Votes	%
Democratic	Peter DeFazio (incumbent)	197,998	68.03%
Republican	John Lindsey	88,950	30.56%
Socialist	David Duemler	3,696	1.27%
Misc.	Misc.	421	0.14%
Total votes		291,065	100
Democratic hold			

=== 2002 ===
United States House election, 2002: Oregon District 4
Party	Candidate	Votes	%
Democratic	Peter DeFazio (incumbent)	168,150	63.82%
Republican	Liz VanLeeuwen	90,523	34.36%
Libertarian	Chris Bigelow	4,602	1.75%
Misc.	Misc.	206	0.07%
Total votes		263,481	100
Democratic hold			

=== 2004 ===
United States House election, 2004: Oregon District 4
Party	Candidate	Votes	%
Democratic	Peter DeFazio (incumbent)	228,611	60.98%
Republican	Jim Feldkamp	140,882	37.58%
Libertarian	Jacob Boone	3,190	0.85%
Constitution	Michael Paul Marsh	1,799	0.48%
Misc.	Misc.	427	0.11%
Total votes		374,909	100
Democratic hold			

=== 2006 ===
United States House election, 2006: Oregon District 4
Party	Candidate	Votes	%
Democratic	Peter DeFazio (incumbent)	180,607	62.23%
Republican	Jim Feldkamp	109,105	37.59%
Misc.	Misc.	532	0.18%
Total votes		290,244	100
Democratic hold			

=== 2008 ===
United States House election, 2008: Oregon District 4
Party	Candidate	Votes	%
Democratic	Peter DeFazio (incumbent)	275,143	82.34%
Constitution	Jaynee Germond	43,133	12.91%
Pacific Green	Mike Beilstein	13,162	3.94%
Misc.	Misc.	2,708	0.81%
Total votes		334,146	100
Democratic hold			

=== 2010 ===
United States House election, 2010: Oregon District 4
Party	Candidate	Votes	%
Democratic	Peter DeFazio (incumbent)	162,416	54.49%
Republican	Art Robinson	129,877	43.58%
Pacific Green	Mike Beilstein	5,215	1.75%
Misc.	Misc.	544	0.18%
Total votes		298,052	100
Democratic hold			

=== 2012 ===
United States House election, 2012: Oregon District 4
Party	Candidate	Votes	%
Democratic	Peter DeFazio (incumbent)	208,196	58.94%
Republican	Art Robinson	138,351	39.17%
Libertarian	Chuck Huntting	6,205	1.76%
Misc.	Misc.	468	0.13%
Total votes		353,220	100
Democratic hold			

=== 2014 ===
United States House election, 2014: Oregon District 4
Party	Candidate	Votes	%
Democratic	Peter DeFazio (incumbent)	181,624	58.55%
Republican	Art Robinson	116,534	37.57%
Pacific Green	Mike Beilstein	6,863	2.21%
Libertarian	David L. Chester	4,676	1.51%
Misc.	Misc.	482	0.16%
Total votes		310,179	100
Democratic hold			

=== 2016 ===
United States House election, 2016: Oregon District 4
Party	Candidate	Votes	%
Democratic	Peter DeFazio (incumbent)	220,628	55.49%
Republican	Art Robinson	157,743	39.68%
Pacific Green	Mike Beilstein	12,194	3.07%
Libertarian	Gil Guthrie	6,527	1.64%
Misc.	Misc.	476	0.12%
Total votes		397,568	100
Democratic hold			

=== 2018 ===
United States House election, 2018: Oregon District 4
Party	Candidate	Votes	%
Democratic	Peter DeFazio (incumbent)	208,710	55.97%
Republican	Art Robinson	152,414	40.87%
Pacific Green	Mike Beilstein	5,956	1.60%
Libertarian	Richard Jacobson	5,370	1.44%
Misc.	Misc.	443	0.12%
Total votes		372,893	100
Democratic hold			

=== 2020 ===
United States House election, 2020: Oregon District 4
Party	Candidate	Votes	%
Democratic	Peter DeFazio (incumbent)	240,950	51.52%
Republican	Alek Skarlatos	216,081	46.20%
Pacific Green	Daniel Hoffay	10,118	2.16%
Misc.	Misc.	556	0.12%
Total votes		467,705	100
Democratic hold			

=== 2022 ===
United States House election, 2022: Oregon District 4
Party	Candidate	Votes	%
Democratic	Val Hoyle	171,372	50.5%
Republican	Alek Skarlatos	146,055	43.1%
Independent Party	Levi Leatherberry	9,052	2.7%
Constitution	Jim Howard	6,075	1.8%
Pacific Green	Michael Beilstein	6,033	1.8%
Write-in		490	0.1%
Total votes		339,077	100
Democratic hold			

=== 2024 ===
2024 United States House election: Oregon District 4
Party	Candidate	Votes	%
Democratic	Val Hoyle (incumbent)	195,862	51.7
Republican	Monique DeSpain	166,430	43.9
Pacific Green	Justin Filip	10,315	2.7
Libertarian	Dan Bahlen	5,704	1.5
Write-in		454	0.1
Total votes		378,765	100%

== Historical district boundaries ==
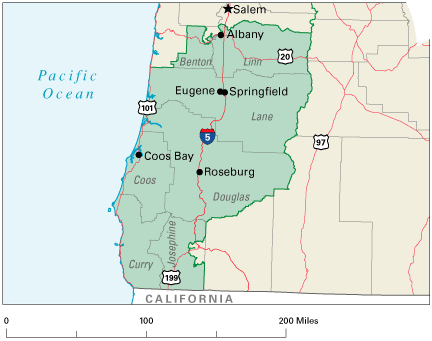
2003 - 2013

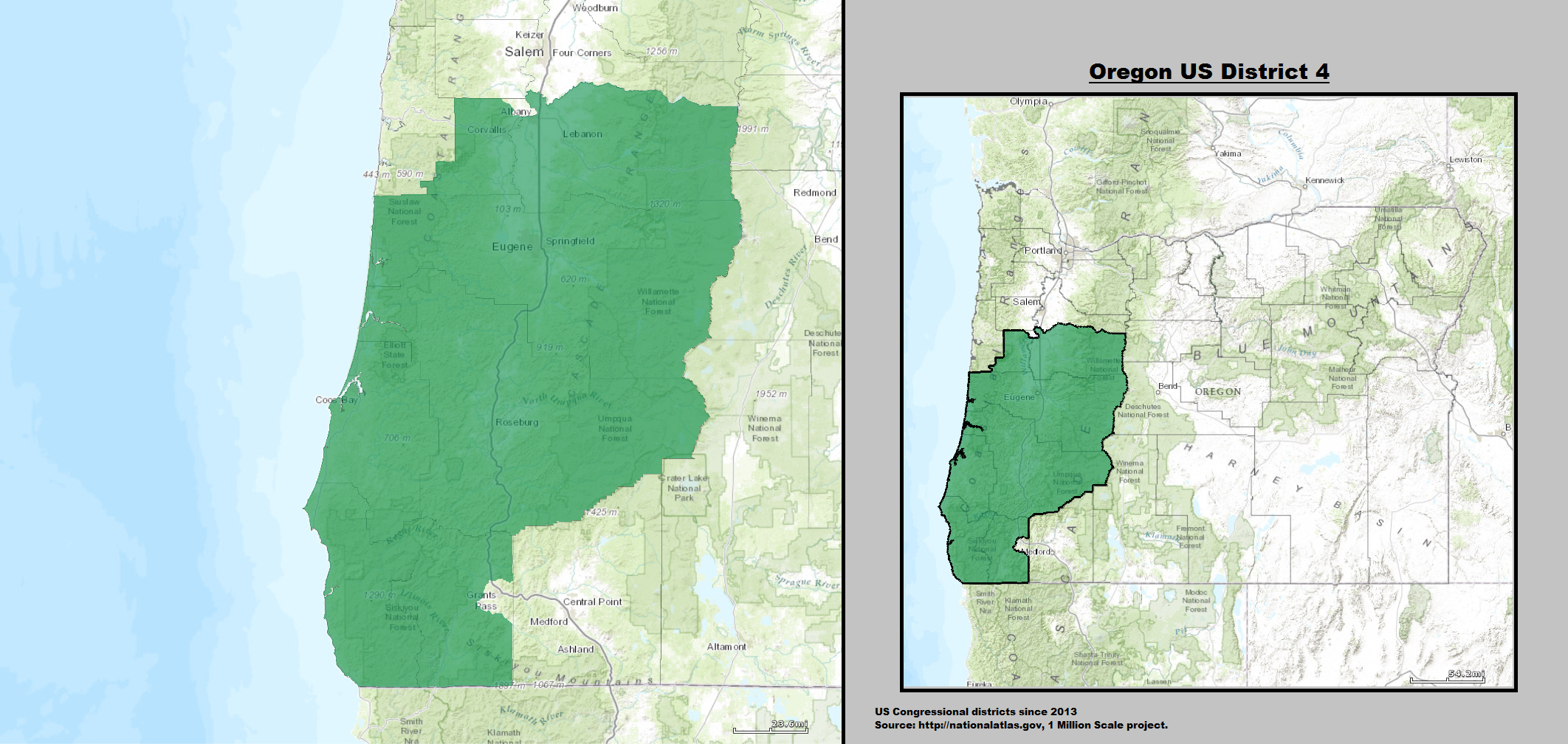
2013 - 2023

The district gained most of Josephine County from the 2nd district in the 2002 redistricting, but also lost most of the Grants Pass area to the second district.

== See also ==
- Oregon's congressional districts
- List of United States congressional districts
