= 2010 United States House of Representatives elections in Oregon =

- November 2, 2010

All 5 Oregon seats to the United States House of Representatives
	Majority party	Minority party
Party	Democratic	Republican
Last election	4	1
Seats won	4	1
Seat change	Steady	Steady
Popular vote	733,639	657,007
Percentage	50.86%	45.54%
Swing	▼10.72%	▲19.63%

Democratic
40–50%
50–60%
60–70%
70–80%
Republican
40–50%
50–60%
60–70%
70–80%
80–90%

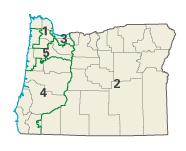
Oregon's United States congressional districts

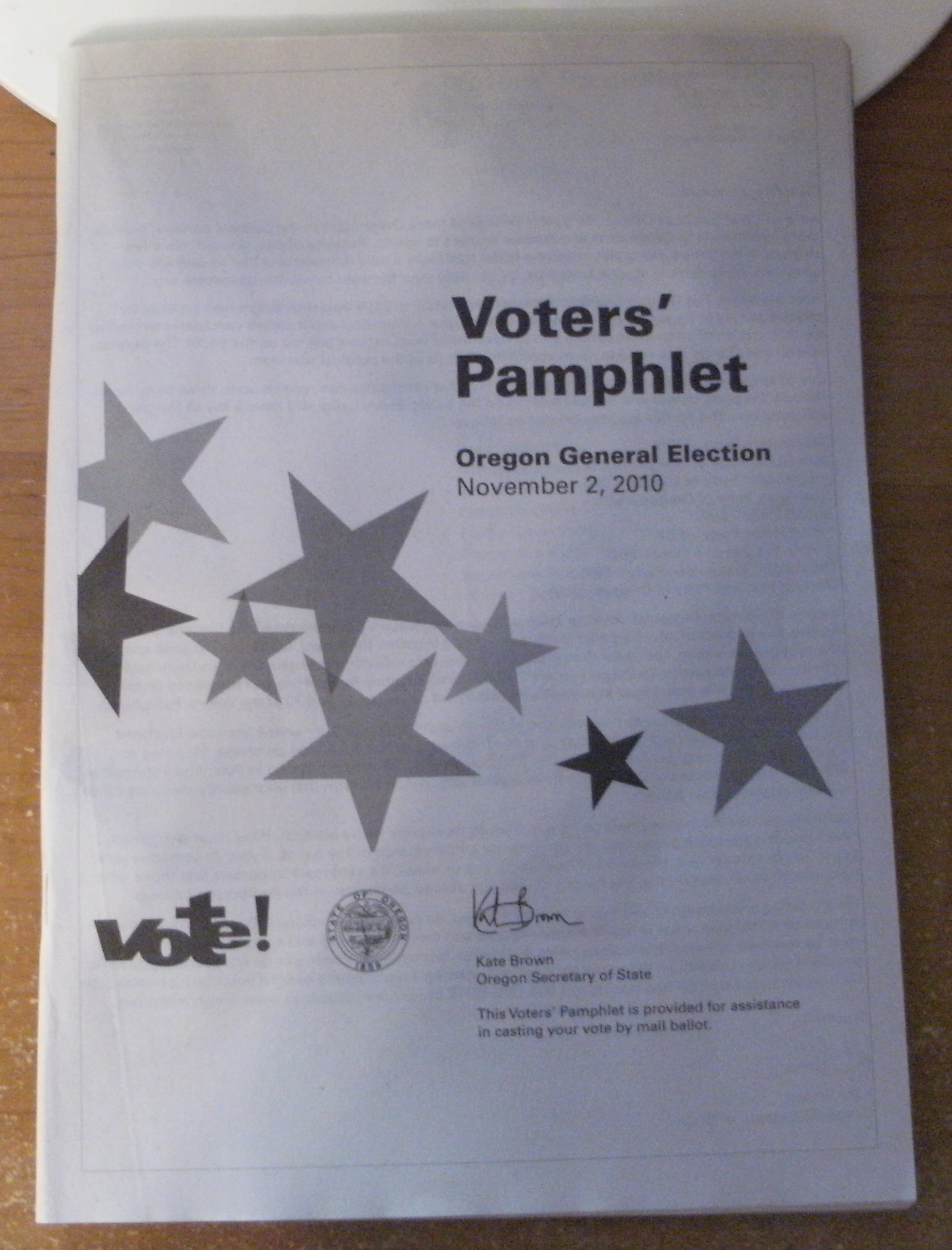
Voters' pamphlet for the 2010 general election

The 2010 United States House of Representatives elections in Oregon were held on November 2, 2010, to determine who would represent the state of Oregon in the United States House of Representatives. Oregon has five seats in the House, apportioned according to the 2000 United States census. All five incumbents, four Democrats and one Republican, were re-elected to another term. Representatives were elected for two-year terms to serve in the 112th Congress from January 3, 2011, until January 3, 2013; however, re-elected Congressman David Wu resigned partway through his term on August 3, 2011, and a special election was held to fill the rest of his unexpired term.

A primary election for Democrats and Republicans was held on May 18. Other parties have other procedures for nominating candidates.

== Overview ==
United States House of Representatives elections in Oregon, 2010
Party	Votes	Percentage	Seats	+/–
Democratic	733,639	50.86%	4	—
Republican	657,007	45.54%	1	—
Pacific Green	21,924	1.52%		—
Libertarian	10,872	0.75%		—
Constitution	3,855	0.27%		—
write-ins	1,448	0.10%		—
Totals	1,442,588	100.00%	5	—

=== By district ===
Results of the 2010 United States House of Representatives elections in Oregon by district:

District	Democratic		Republican		Others		Total		Result
District	Votes	%	Votes	%	Votes	%	Votes	%	Result
District 1	160,357	54.75%	122,858	41.94%	9,694	3.31%	292,909	100.0%	Democratic hold
District 2	72,173	25.87%	206,245	73.91%	619	0.22%	279,037	100.0%	Republican hold
District 3	193,104	70.02%	67,714	24.55%	14,984	5.43%	275,802	100.0%	Democratic hold
District 4	162,416	54.49%	129,877	43.58%	5,759	1.93%	298,052	100.0%	Democratic hold
District 5	145,319	51.25%	130,313	45.96%	7,924	2.79%	283,556	100.0%	Democratic hold
Total	733,369	51.31%	657,007	45.96%	38,980	2.73%	1,429,356	100.0%	

== District 1 ==
2010 Oregon's 1st congressional district election
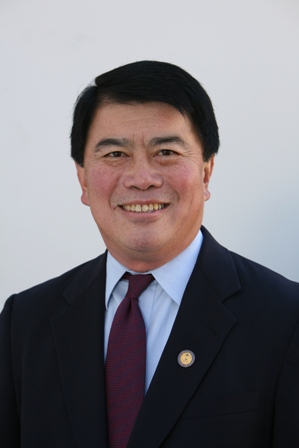

Nominee	David Wu	Rob Cornilles
Party	Democratic	Republican
Popular vote	160,357	122,858
Percentage	54.8%	41.9%
- County results Wu: 50–60% 70–80% Cornilles: 50–60%
U.S. Representative before election
David Wu
Democratic
Elected U.S. Representative
David Wu
Democratic

Incumbent Democrat David Wu has represented Oregon's 1st congressional district since 1998 and was re-elected to a seventh term in 2010, defeating sports marketing consultant Rob Cornilles, who won the Republican primary.

In 2008, Wu won with 71% of the vote. He faced no Republican opponent because the winner of the Republican primary, Joel Haugen, changed his affiliation to the Independent Party of Oregon after his endorsement of Democrat Barack Obama for president drew objections from Republican party leaders.

=== Democratic primary ===
==== Candidates ====
- David Robinson, businessman and U.S. Naval Academy teacher
- David Wu, incumbent U.S. Representative

==== Results ====
Democratic Primary results
Party	Candidate	Votes	%
Democratic	David Wu	61,439	80.92
Democratic	David Robinson	14,102	18.57
	write-ins	383	0.50
Total votes		75,924	100

=== Republican primary ===
==== Candidates ====
- Stephan Andrew Brodhead, real estate portfolio manager
- Rob Cornilles, sports marketing consultant
- Douglas Fitzgerald Keller, retired Naval aviator
- John Kuzmanich, businessman

==== Results ====
Republican Primary results
Party	Candidate	Votes	%
Republican	Rob Cornilles	21,441	41.07
Republican	Douglas Fitzgerald Keller	14,785	28.32
Republican	John Kuzmanich	14,464	27.71
Republican	Stephan Andrew Brodhead	1,213	2.32
	write-ins	299	0.57
Total votes		52,202	100

=== General election ===
==== Candidates ====
- Rob Cornilles (Republican), sports marketing consultant
- Chris Henry ( Pacific Green, Progressive), truck driver
- Don LaMunyon (Constitution), research chemist
- H. Joe Tabor (Libertarian), self-employed consultant
- David Wu (Democrat), incumbent U.S. Representative

==== Polling ====
Poll Source	Date Administered	Rob Cornilles (R)	Don LaMunyon (C)	David Wu (D)	Other/Undecided
Elway Research	October 18–21, 2010	38%	-	51%	11%
Survey USA	October 16–18, 2010	42%	2%	51%	5%
Moore Research	May 26–27, 2010	40%	-	46%	-

==== Predictions ====
Source	Ranking	As of
The Cook Political Report	Likely D	November 1, 2010
Rothenberg	Safe D	November 1, 2010
Sabato's Crystal Ball	Safe D	November 1, 2010
RCP	Likely D	November 1, 2010
CQ Politics	Likely D	October 28, 2010
New York Times	Safe D	November 1, 2010
FiveThirtyEight	Safe D	November 1, 2010

==== Results ====
Oregon's 1st congressional district election, 2010
Party	Candidate	Votes	%
Democratic	David Wu	160,357	54.75
Republican	Rob Cornilles	122,858	41.94
Constitution	Don LaMunyon	3,855	1.32
Pacific Green	Chris Henry	2,955	1.01
Libertarian	H. Joe Tabor	2,492	0.85
	write-ins	392	0.13
Total votes		292,517	100
Democratic hold			

== District 2 ==
2010 Oregon's 2nd congressional district election
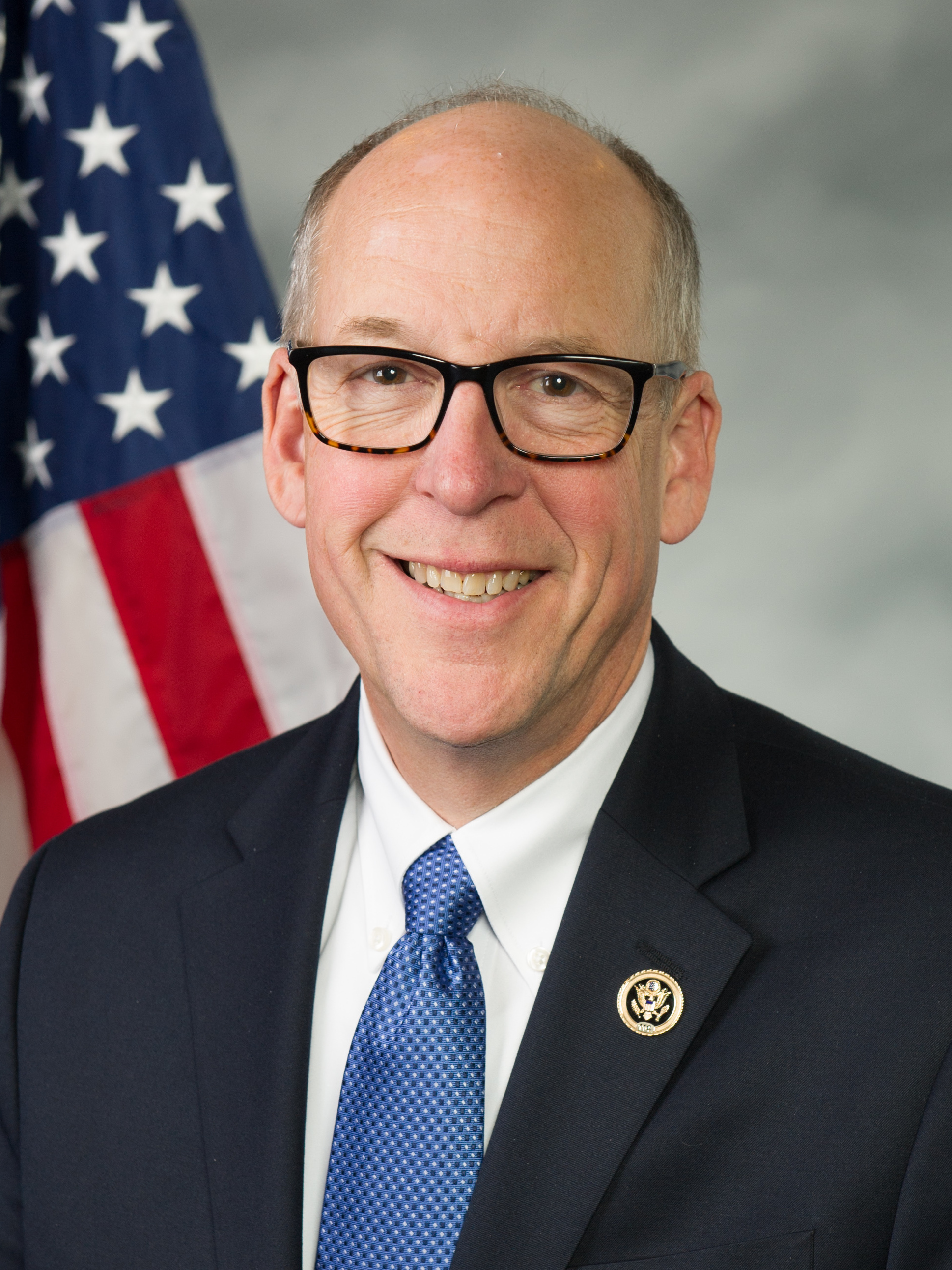

Nominee	Greg Walden	Joyce B. Segers
Party	Republican	Democratic
Popular vote	206,245	72,173
Percentage	73.9%	25.9%
- County results Walden: 60–70% 70–80% 80–90%
U.S. Representative before election
Greg Walden
Republican
Elected U.S. Representative
Greg Walden
Republican

Incumbent Republican Greg Walden has represented Oregon's 2nd congressional district since 1998, and was re-elected to a seventh term in 2010, defeating Democrat Joyce Segers, a writer from Ashland. Both candidates were unopposed in their respective primaries.

=== Democratic primary ===
==== Candidates ====
- Joyce B. Segers, writer (unopposed)

=== Republican primary ===
==== Candidates ====
- Greg Walden, incumbent U.S. Representative (unopposed)

=== General election ===
==== Candidates ====
- Joyce B. Segers (Democrat), writer
- Greg Walden (Republican), incumbent U.S. Representative

==== Predictions ====
Source	Ranking	As of
The Cook Political Report	Safe R	November 1, 2010
Rothenberg	Safe R	November 1, 2010
Sabato's Crystal Ball	Safe R	November 1, 2010
RCP	Safe R	November 1, 2010
CQ Politics	Safe R	October 28, 2010
New York Times	Safe R	November 1, 2010
FiveThirtyEight	Safe R	November 1, 2010

==== Results ====
Oregon's 2nd congressional district election, 2010
Party	Candidate	Votes	%
Republican	Greg Walden	206,245	73.91
Democratic	Joyce B. Segers	72,173	25.87
	write-ins	619	0.22
Total votes		279,037	100
Republican hold			

== District 3 ==
2010 Oregon's 3rd congressional district election
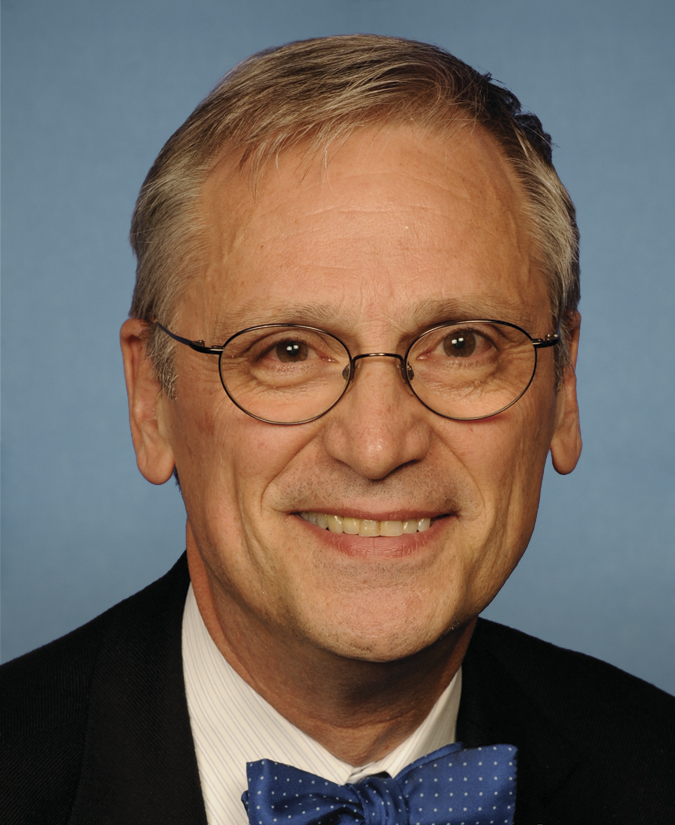

Nominee	Earl Blumenauer	Delia Lopez
Party	Democratic	Republican
Popular vote	193,104	67,714
Percentage	70.0%	24.6%
- County results Blumenauer: 50–60% 70–80%
U.S. Representative before election
Earl Blumenauer
Democratic
Elected U.S. Representative
Earl Blumenauer
Democratic

Incumbent Democrat Earl Blumenauer has represented Oregon's 3rd congressional district since 1996 and was re-elected to an eighth term in 2010. In 2008, he took 75% of the vote. He faced a rematch with his 2008 Republican opponent, Delia Lopez, a real estate investor from Oakland, Oregon.

=== Democratic primary ===
==== Candidates ====
- Earl Blumenauer, incumbent
- John Sweeney, land management consultant

==== Results ====
Democratic Primary results
Party	Candidate	Votes	%
Democratic	Earl Blumenauer	73,962	91.23
Democratic	John Sweeney	6,774	8.36
	write-ins	337	0.42
Total votes		81,073	100

=== Republican primary ===
==== Candidates ====
- Delia Lopez, homemaker and real estate investor (unopposed)

=== General election ===
==== Candidates ====
- Earl Blumenauer (Democrat), incumbent U.S. Representative
- Jeff Lawrence (Independent, Libertarian), attorney and policy director
- Delia Lopez (Republican), homemaker and real estate investor
- Michael Meo (Pacific Green, Progressive), high school and college mathematics teacher

==== Predictions ====
Source	Ranking	As of
The Cook Political Report	Safe D	November 1, 2010
Rothenberg	Safe D	November 1, 2010
Sabato's Crystal Ball	Safe D	November 1, 2010
RCP	Safe D	November 1, 2010
CQ Politics	Safe D	October 28, 2010
New York Times	Safe D	November 1, 2010
FiveThirtyEight	Safe D	November 1, 2010

==== Results ====
Oregon's 3rd congressional district election, 2010
Party	Candidate	Votes	%
Democratic	Earl Blumenauer	193,104	70.02
Republican	Delia Lopez	67,714	24.55
Libertarian	Jeff Lawrence	8,380	3.04
Pacific Green	Michael Meo	6,197	2.25
	write-ins	407	0.15
Total votes		275,802	100
Democratic hold			

=== Campaign Finance ===
As of September 30, 2010. Source: Federal Election Commission

Candidate (party)	Receipts	Disbursements	Cash on hand	Debt
Earl Blumenauer (D)	$920,464	$899,220	$394,775	$0
Delia Lopez (R)	$84,231	$8,310	$75,920	$56,031
Jeffrey Lawrence (L)	$24,834	$9,576	$15,258	$10,000
Michael Meo (G)	Unreported			

== District 4 ==
2010 Oregon's 4th congressional district election
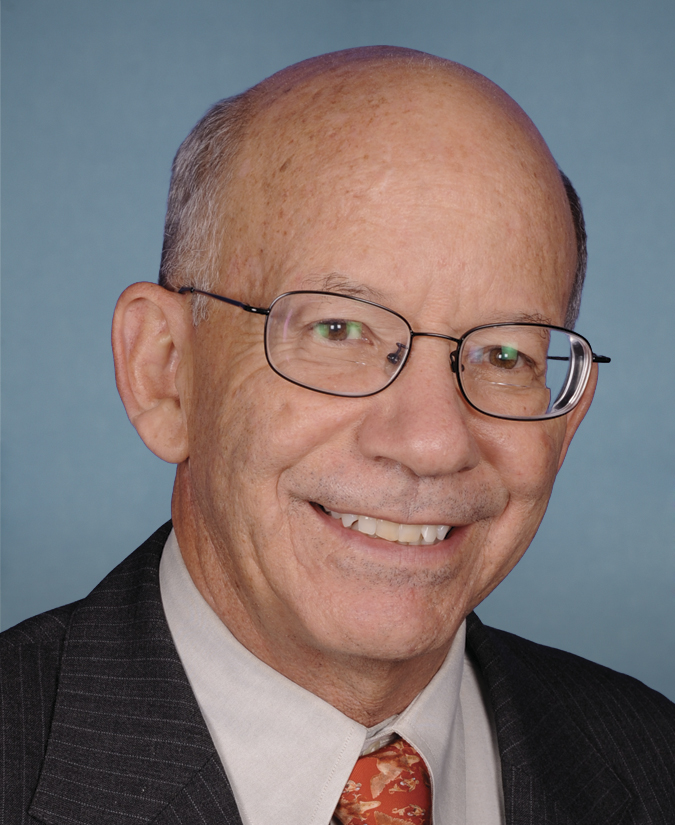

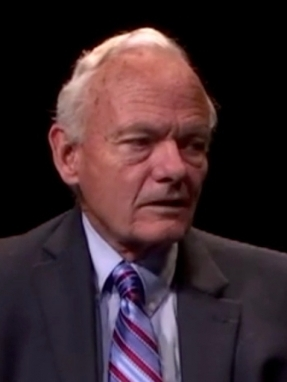
Nominee	Peter DeFazio	Arthur B. Robinson
Party	Democratic	Republican
Popular vote	162,416	129,877
Percentage	54.5%	43.6%
- County results Defazio: 40–50% 60–70% Robinson: 50–60%
U.S. Representative before election
Peter DeFazio
Democratic
Elected U.S. Representative
Peter DeFazio
Democratic

Incumbent Democrat Peter DeFazio, the senior member of Oregon's House delegation, was re-elected to a 13th term in 2010, defeating chemist Arthur B. Robinson, winner of the Republican primary. DeFazio had briefly considered a run for Governor of Oregon. He has represented Oregon's 4th congressional district since 1986. In 2008, with no Republican opposition, he won 82% of the vote.

=== Democratic primary ===
==== Candidates ====
- Peter DeFazio, incumbent U.S. Representative (unopposed)

=== Republican primary ===
Springfield mayor Sid Leiken announced his candidacy as a Republican, but dropped it in March 2010 to run for a seat on the Lane County Board of Commissioners. Leiken had faced controversy over money paid to his campaign that he said was reimbursement for a poll conducted by his mother's company. No documentation existed for the payment, which is a possible violation of Oregon election laws.

==== Candidates ====
- Jaynee Germond, small business owner
- Arthur B. Robinson, chemist

==== Results ====
Republican Primary results
Party	Candidate	Votes	%
Republican	Arthur B. Robinson	49,401	79.16
Republican	Jaynee Germond	12,495	20.02
	write-ins	512	0.82
Total votes		62,408	100

=== General election ===
==== Candidates ====
- Michael Beilstein (Pacific Green), chemist
- Peter DeFazio (Democrat, Progressive, Working Families), incumbent U.S. Representative
- Arthur B. Robinson (Constitution, Independent, Republican), chemist

==== Polling ====
Poll Source	Date Administered	Art Robinson (R)	Peter DeFazio (D)	Other/Undecided
Grove Insights (D)	October 11–12, 2010	39%	53%	8%
Global Perspective Innovative Research (R)	October 4–5, 2010	42%	48%	10%

Hypothetical polling

Generic Democrat vs. generic Republican

Poll source	Date(s) administered	Generic Democrat	Generic Republican	Undecided
Global Perspective Innovative Research (R)	October 4–5, 2010	44%	45%	11%

==== Predictions ====
Source	Ranking	As of
The Cook Political Report	Likely D	November 1, 2010
Rothenberg	Safe D	November 1, 2010
Sabato's Crystal Ball	Safe D	November 1, 2010
RCP	Lean D	November 1, 2010
CQ Politics	Safe D	October 28, 2010
New York Times	Safe D	November 1, 2010
FiveThirtyEight	Safe D	November 1, 2010

==== Results ====
Oregon's 4th congressional district election, 2010
Party	Candidate	Votes	%
Democratic	Peter DeFazio	162,416	54.49
Republican	Arthur B. Robinson	129,877	43.58
Pacific Green	Michael Beilstein	5,215	1.75
	write-ins	544	0.18
Total votes		298,052	100
Democratic hold			

== District 5 ==
2010 Oregon's 5th congressional district election
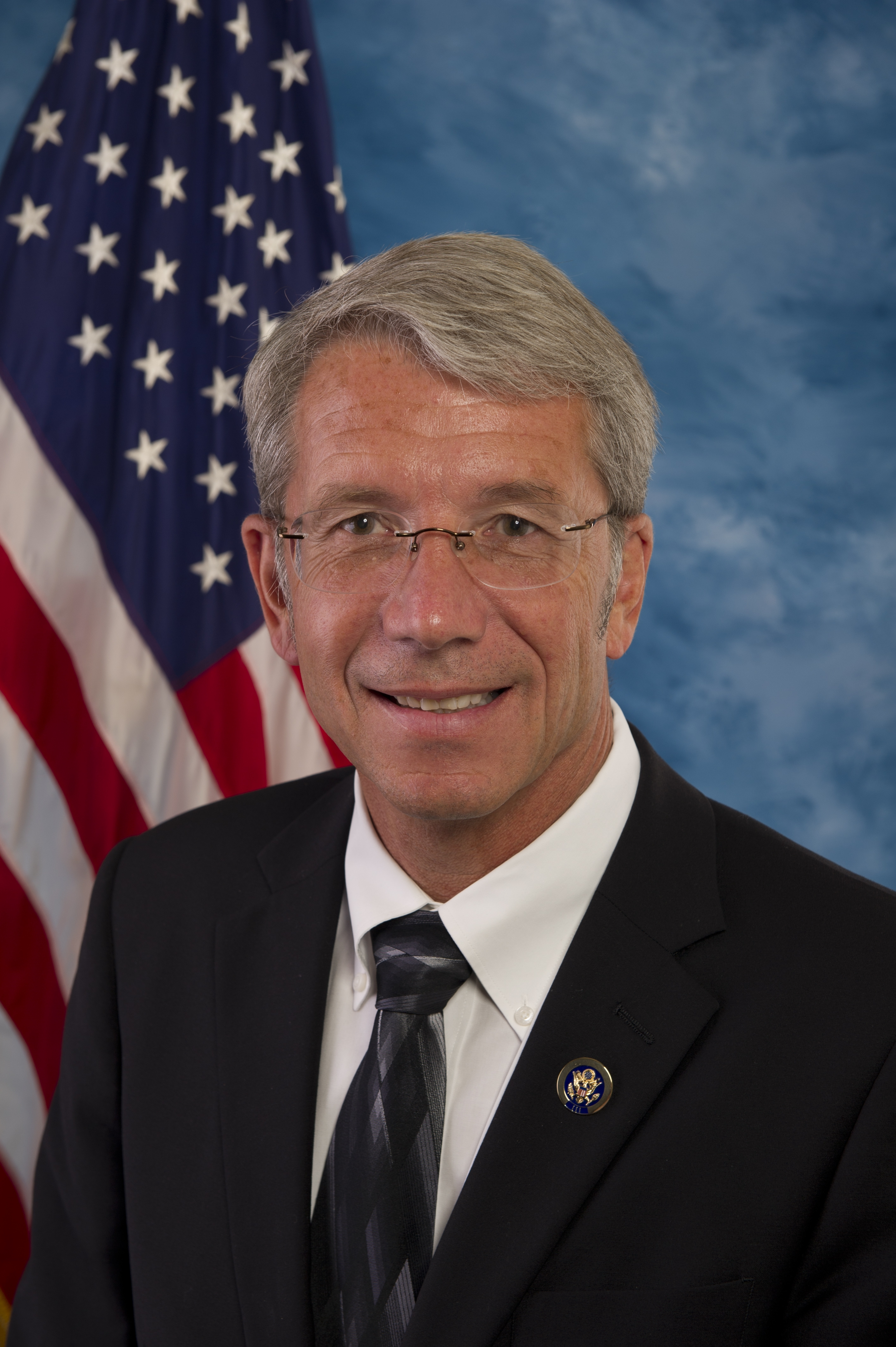

Nominee	Kurt Schrader	Scott Bruun
Party	Democratic	Republican
Popular vote	145,319	130,313
Percentage	51.3%	46.0%
- County results Schrader: 40–50% 50–60% 70–80% Bruun: 40–50%
U.S. Representative before election
Kurt Schrader
Democratic
Elected U.S. Representative
Kurt Schrader
Democratic

Democratic incumbent Kurt Schrader defeated Republican nominee Oregon State Representative Scott Bruun and Pacific Green and Progressive candidate Chris Lugo to win a second term in Oregon's 5th congressional district. Schrader was first elected in 2008, winning against Republican nominee Mike Erickson after six-term Democratic incumbent Darlene Hooley announced her retirement. The district is usually the most competitive in Oregon, though it has become more Democratic in recent years.

=== Democratic primary ===
==== Candidates ====
- Kurt Schrader, incumbent U.S. Representative (unopposed)

=== Republican primary ===
==== Candidates ====
- Scott Bruun, Oregon State Representative from West Linn
- Fred Thompson, former Georgia-Pacific executive

==== Results ====
Republican Primary results
Party	Candidate	Votes	%
Republican	Scott Bruun	37,778	62.28
Republican	Fred Thompson	22,616	37.28
	write-ins	235	0.39
Total votes		60,659	100

=== General election ===
==== Candidates ====
- Scott Bruun (Independent, Republican), Oregon State Representative
- Chris Lugo (Pacific Green, Progressive), journalist
- Kurt Schrader (Democrat), incumbent U.S. Representative

==== Polling ====
Poll Source	Date Administered	Scott Bruun (R)	Chris Lugo (PG)	Kurt Schrader (D)	Other/Undecided
Elway Research	October 18–21, 2010	38%	2%	50%	11%
Survey USA	October 17–19, 2010	51%	2%	41%	6%
American Action Forum	August 23–29, 2010	36%	-	44%	21%
Moore Research	August 18–19, 2010	41%	-	38%	22%
Lake Research Partners	July 21–25, 2010	35%	-	46%	-

==== Predictions ====
Source	Ranking	As of
The Cook Political Report	Tossup	November 1, 2010
Rothenberg	Tossup	November 1, 2010
Sabato's Crystal Ball	Lean D	November 1, 2010
RCP	Tossup	November 1, 2010
CQ Politics	Tossup	October 28, 2010
New York Times	Tossup	November 1, 2010
FiveThirtyEight	Lean R (flip)	November 1, 2010

==== Results ====
Oregon's 5th congressional district election, 2010
Party	Candidate	Votes	%
Democratic	Kurt Schrader	145,319	51.25
Republican	Scott Bruun	130,313	45.96
Pacific Green	Chris Lugo	7,557	2.67
	write-ins	367	0.13
Total votes		283,556	100
Democratic hold			

== See also ==
- United States House of Representatives elections, 2010
- Oregon state elections, 2010
- United States Senate election in Oregon, 2010
- Oregon gubernatorial election, 2010
