= Pacific Green Party =

Political party in Oregon

Pacific Green Party of Oregon
- Governing Body: Coordinating Committee; 7 Co-Chairs
- State Senate Leader: None
- State House Leader: None
- Founded: 1992 (as Pacific Party); 1999 (as Pacific Green Party)
- Headquarters: 1695 Chemeketa Street NE; Salem, Oregon; 97301
- Membership (2026): ▼7,713
- Ideology: Green politics Social democracy Progressivism
- Political position: Left-wing
- National affiliation: Green Party of the United States
- International affiliation: Global Greens
- Colors: Green
- Oregon State Senate: 0 / 30
- Oregon House of Representatives: 0 / 60
- Local Offices: 10 (September 2024)

Website
- pacificgreens.org

The Pacific Green Party of Oregon (PGP) is a left-wing political party in the U.S. state of Oregon, recognized by the Oregon Secretary of State. It is affiliated with the Green Party of the United States. The party has occasionally elected candidates to public office at the local level.

The party gained public attention during Ralph Nader's presidential campaign in 2000, which saw Nader garner over 5% of the vote statewide.

== History ==
The party was initially founded as the Pacific Party in 1992, largely in response of the perceived failure of the Democratic Party to provide meaningful opposition to the 1991 Gulf War.

Many of the party's early candidates were also highly involved in the forest protection movement. These included candidate for United States Senate Lou Gold in 1994; Joe Keating for Congress and Andy Davis for state representative in 1996; and Blair Bobier for governor and Karen Moskowitz for U.S. Senate in 1998. Davis and Keating were arrested for civil disobedience at the United States Forest Service office building in downtown Portland during the campaign, chaining themselves to a desk along with local activist attorney Stu Sugarman.

Ralph Nader was the party's nominee for President of the United States in 1996, and his vice-presidential candidate, Winona LaDuke, came to Portland and walked a local picket line in support of raising the minimum wage. In addition to running candidates for office that year, the Pacific Party helped pass initiatives to raise the state minimum wage and expand the Portland area light rail system.

In 2004, Teresa Keane, the Green Party's candidate for the United States Senate, won 2.4% of the vote – more than any other Green candidate for the U.S. Senate in that year. In 2006 Keane was elected Chair of the newly formed Green Senatorial Campaign Committee (GSCC), a seven-member committee elected by the National Committee of the Green Party of the United States to raise funds for senate candidates.

== Platform ==
The party's platform emphasizes environmentalism, economic and social justice, peace and nonviolence, and respect for diversity. The party's platform expresses the following positions:

- Public campaign financing for all campaigns for public office and strict limits on political campaign contributions.
- Support for net neutrality.
- Support for instant run-off voting, proportional representation in the Oregon State Legislature, and proportional allocation of Oregon's Electoral College votes by Congressional district with the end goal of electing the President solely by the popular vote with the abolishment of the Electoral College.
- Voting rights for convicted felons and ex-felons.
- Passage of a single-payer health care system.
- Protection of a women's right to abortion and supportive of legal physician-assisted suicide.
- Establishment of carbon taxes to promote use of renewable energy.
- Opposed to nuclear weapons and to using nuclear power to generate electricity.
- Support for legalization and cultivation of hemp and marijuana.
- Support for a ban on patent claims on naturally originating organisms and plants.
- Support for the establishment of a federal Department of Peace.
- Support for the release of nonviolent drug offenders from prison.
- Opposed to private prisons.
- Abolishment of the death penalty.
- Abolishment of the state's lottery.

== Current elected officials ==
The following are currently elected Green officeholders in the state of Oregon:

- David Shannon, Corbett Fire District Board of Directors – term through May 2027
- Jonathan Bean, Tillamook County Transportation District – term through May 2027
- Richard Seeberger, Lincoln County Water District Board of Supervisors – term through May 2027
- Abe Currin, Umatilla County Community College Board of Education – term through May 2025
- Brian Powers, Hubbard Fire Protection District – term through May 2025
- Alex Polikoff, Corvallis Fire Protection District – term through May 2025
- Chloe Flora, Baker County Health District – term through May 2025
- Josiah Dean, Durfur City Council – term through November 2024
- Michael Clary, Coos County Soil and Water Conservation District – term through November 2024
- Matt Donohue, Oregon Circuit Court Judge – term through May 2026

== Election results ==
=== Presidential elections ===
Year	Nominee	Votes	%
1996	Ralph Nader	49,415	3.59%
2000	Ralph Nader	77,357	5.04%
2004	David Cobb	5,315	0.29%
2008	Cynthia McKinney	4,543	0.25%
2012	Jill Stein	19,427	1.09%
2016	Jill Stein	50,002	2.50%
2020	Howie Hawkins	11,831	0.50%
2024	Jill Stein	19,099	0.85%

=== Senate elections ===
Year	Nominee	Votes	%
1996	Gary Kutcher	14,193	1.04%
1996*	Lou Gold	7,225	0.60%
1998	Karyn Moskowitz	22,024	1.97%
2004	Teresa Keane	45,053	2.41%
2014	Christina Jean Lugo	32,434	2.22%
2016	Eric Navickas	48,823	2.50%
2020	Ibrahim Taher	42,239	1.82%
2022	Dan Pulju	23,454	1.22%

=== Gubernatorial elections ===
Year	Nominee	Votes	%
1998	Blair Bobier	15,843	1.42%
2006	Joe Keating	20,030	1.45%
2014	Jason Levin	29,561	2.01%

== See also ==
- List of state Green Parties
- Political party strength in Oregon
- Politics of Oregon
- Elections in Oregon
