= An act to affirm the policy of the United States regarding Internet governance =

Internet governance

- Long title: To affirm the policy of the United States regarding Internet governance.
- Announced in: the 113th United States Congress
- Sponsored by: Rep. Greg Walden (R, OR-2)
- Number of co-sponsors: 32

Codification
- Agencies affected: United States Congress, Executive Office of the President

Legislative history
- Introduced in the House as H.R. 1580 by Rep. Greg Walden (R-OR) on April 16, 2013; Committee consideration by United States House Committee on Energy and Commerce, United States House Energy Subcommittee on Communications and Technology

The bill H.R. 1580 (H.R. 1580)(long title: "To affirm the policy of the United States regarding Internet governance") was a bill introduced into the United States House of Representatives in the 113th United States Congress. The bill primarily listed a series of Congressional "findings" regarding the internet, its use, and the way it has been governed. Finally, the bill affirms that "it is the policy of the United States to preserve and advance the successful multistakeholder model that governs the Internet."

== Provisions/Elements of the bill ==
The text of H.R. 1580 as it was first introduced includes:

SECTION 1. FINDINGS. The 113th United States Congress finds the following:

(1) Given the importance of the Internet to the global economy, it is essential that the Internet remain stable, secure, and free from government control.
(2) The world deserves the access to knowledge, services, commerce, and communication, the accompanying benefits to economic development, education, and health care, and the informed discussion that is the bedrock of democratic self-government that the Internet provides.
(3) The structure of Internet governance has profound implications for competition and trade, democratization, free expression, and access to information.
(4) Countries have obligations to protect human rights, whether exercised online or offline.
(5) The ability to innovate, develop technical capacity, grasp economic opportunities, and promote freedom of expression online is best realized in cooperation with all stakeholders.
(6) Proposals have been, and will likely continue to be, put forward at international regulatory bodies that would fundamentally alter the governance and operation of the Internet.
(7) The proposals would attempt to justify increased government control over the Internet and could undermine the current multistakeholder model that has enabled the Internet to flourish and under which the private sector, civil society, academia, and individual users play an important role in charting its direction.
(8) The proposals would diminish the freedom of expression on the Internet in favor of government control over content.
(9) The position of the United States Government has been and is to advocate for the flow of information free from government control.
(10) This Administration and past Administrations have made a strong commitment to the multistakeholder model of Internet governance and the promotion of the global benefits of the Internet.

SEC. 2. POLICY REGARDING INTERNET GOVERNANCE. It is the policy of the United States to preserve and advance the successful multistakeholder model that governs the Internet.

== Procedural history ==
=== House ===
H.R. 1580 was introduced into the House of Representatives by Rep. Greg Walden (R-OR) on April 16, 2013. The bill was referred to the United States House Committee on Energy and Commerce and then the United States House Energy Subcommittee on Communications and Technology.

As of May 13, 2013, the bill had 32 co-sponsors, all of them original co-sponsors that had signed up as co-sponsors on April 16, 2013. Of these co-sponsors, 26 were Republicans and 6 were Democrats.

A Congressional Budget Office report from May 2, 2013, indicated that "based on information from the Federal Communications Commission and the National Telecommunications and Information Administration, CBO estimates that implementing the bill would not have an effect on spending subject to appropriation because the workloads of those agencies would not be affected."

The bill was reported out of committee on May 3, 2013, alongside House Report 113-50. The House Majority Leader Eric Cantor announced on Friday May 10, 2013, that H.R. 1580 would be considered the following week.

== Debate and discussion ==
The Internet Association, a lobbying organization, released a statement on April 18, 2013, expressing its support for the legislation. In their statement, they argued that "the unique nature of the Internet – free from government control and governed by multiple stakeholders – has unleashed unprecedented entrepreneurialism, creativity, innovation, and freedom far beyond imagination. Preserving a free Internet for all people is essential to the preservation of political and economic liberty."

Section 2 of the legislation text was altered during the committee process in order to gain support from Congressional Democrats. The original concluding statement of the bill included the phrase "free from government control" seen in the Discussion Draft. Rep. Henry Waxman (D-CA) stated that Democrats objected to the language because they fears it would restrict the Federal Communications Commission and its ability to enforce its own rules of network neutrality.

== See also ==
- Internet governance
- History of the Internet
- Internet organizations
- Net neutrality in the United States
- List of bills in the 113th United States Congress
