= Central Oregon Jobs and Water Security Act =

- Long title: To amend the Wild and Scenic Rivers Act to adjust the Crooked River boundary, to provide water certainty for the City of Prineville, Oregon, and for other purposes.
- Announced in: the 113th United States Congress
- Sponsored by: Rep. Greg Walden (R, OR-2)
- Number of co-sponsors: 0

Codification
- Acts affected: Act of August 6, 1956, Reclamation Reform Act of 1982, Wild and Scenic Rivers Act, Acts of September 14, 1959, and others.
- U.S.C. sections affected: 43 U.S.C. § 390mm, 43 U.S.C. § 390aa et seq., 16 U.S.C. § 1274, 43 U.S.C. § 371 et seq.
- Agencies affected: United States Department of the Interior, Bureau of Land Management, United States Bureau of Reclamation, Federal Energy Regulatory Commission

Legislative history
- Introduced in the House as H.R. 2640 by Rep. Greg Walden (R, OR-2) on July 10, 2013; Committee consideration by United States House Committee on Natural Resources, United States House Natural Resources Subcommittee on Public Lands and Environmental Regulation, United States House Natural Resources Subcommittee on Water and Power; Passed the House on October 29, 2013

The Central Oregon Jobs and Water Security Act, also known as the Crooked River Collaborative Water Security and Jobs Act of 2014, (H.R. 2640) is a land-use and water bill related to the Crooked River in Oregon and the Bowman Dam. H.R. 2640 would modify features of the Crooked River Project located in central Oregon, north of the city of Prineville, and prioritize how water from the project would be allocated for different uses. It was introduced into the United States House of Representatives during the 113th United States Congress.

== Background ==
Identical legislation (H.R. 2060) passed the House during the 112th United States Congress, but died in the Senate.

== Provisions of the bill ==
This summary is based largely on the summary provided by the Congressional Research Service, a public domain source.

The Central Oregon Jobs and Water Security Act would amend the Wild and Scenic Rivers Act to modify the boundary of the Crooked River, Oregon. It would require the developer for any hydropower development at Bowman Dam to analyze any impacts to the Outstanding Remarkable Values of the Wild and Scenic River that may be caused by such development and propose mitigation for such impacts as part of any license application submitted to the Federal Energy Regulatory Commission (FERC).

The bill would increase (from 10 to 17 cubic feet per second) the minimum release that shall be maintained from the Prineville Reservoir for the benefit of downstream fish life. It would also require 7 of the 17 cubic feet per second release to serve as mitigation for the city of Prineville groundwater pumping, as determined necessary for any given year by the city, including any shaping of the release of the up to 7 cubic feet per second to coincide with the city's groundwater pumping as may be required by the state of Oregon. The bill would authorize the Secretary of the Army to make applications to that state in conjunction with that city to protect these supplies instream. The bill would direct the city to make payment to the Secretary for that portion of the minimum release that actually serves as mitigation under Oregon law. The bill would authorize the Secretary to contract exclusively with the city for additional amounts in the future at the city's request.

The Central Oregon Jobs and Water Security Act would direct the Secretary, on a "first fill" priority basis, to store in and release from the Reservoir: (1) 68,273 acre feet of water annually to fulfill all 16 Bureau of Reclamation contracts existing as of January 1, 2011; (2) up to 2,740 acre feet of water annually to supply the McKay Creek lands; and (3) up to 10,000 acre feet of water annually to the North Unit Irrigation District, upon request, pursuant to a Temporary Water Service Contract.

The bill would authorize any landowner within Ochoco Irrigation District, Oregon, to repay construction costs of project facilities allocated to that landowner's lands within that District. It would require the United States Secretary of the Interior, upon the request of a landowner who has repaid project construction costs, to provide certification of freedom from ownership and pricing limitations.

The bill would modify the District's reclamation contracts, on approval of the District directors, to: (1) authorize the use of water for instream purposes in order for the District to engage in, or take advantage of, conserved water projects and temporary instream leasing as authorized by Oregon law; (2) include within the district boundary approximately 2,742 acres in the vicinity of McKay Creek; (3) classify approximately 685 of such acres as irrigable; and (4) provide the District with stored water from Prineville Reservoir for supplying such 685 acres, contingent on the transfer of existing appurtenant McKay Creek water rights to instream use and the state's issuance of water rights for the use of stored water.

== Congressional Budget Office report ==
This summary is based largely on the summary provided by the Congressional Budget Office, as ordered reported by the House Committee on Natural Resources on July 24, 2013. This is a public domain source.

H.R. 2640 would modify features of the Crooked River Project located in central Oregon, north of the city of Prineville, and prioritize how water from the project would be allocated for different uses. Based on information from the Bureau of Reclamation, the Congressional Budget Office (CBO) estimated that enacting H.R. 2640 would have an insignificant impact on direct spending; therefore, pay-as-you-go procedures apply. The legislation would not affect revenues or spending that is subject to appropriation.

The main features of the Crooked River Project include the Bowman Dam, the Prineville Reservoir, and the Ochoco Dam and Reservoir located in the Ochoco Irrigation District. Enacting two provisions of H.R. 2640 would have an insignificant impact on net direct spending over the next 10 years. Those provisions would:

- Require the city of Prineville to pay the Bureau of Reclamation for additional water to be released from the Prineville Reservoir. Based on information from the bureau, the CBO estimated that those payments would average less than $35,000 annually.
- Authorize landowners in the Ochoco Irrigation District to prepay certain construction costs of the Crooked River Project allocated to their land. Those landowners currently owe the bureau $315,000, and the CBO estimated that exercising the prepayment option would increase net receipts by less than $20,000 over the 2014-2023 period.

The CBO estimated that implementing other provisions of the bill would have no significant impact on the federal budget. H.R. 2640 contains no intergovernmental or private-sector mandates as defined in the Unfunded Mandates Reform Act and would impose no costs on state, local, or tribal governments.

== Procedural history ==
=== House ===
The Central Oregon Jobs and Water Security Act was introduced into the House on July 10, 2013 by Rep. Greg Walden (R, OR-2). It was referred to the United States House Committee on Natural Resources, the United States House Natural Resources Subcommittee on Public Lands and Environmental Regulation, and the United States House Natural Resources Subcommittee on Water and Power. The Committee agreed by voice vote on July 24, 2013 to report the bill. It was reported alongside House Report 113-224 on September 20, 2013. On October 25, 2013, House Majority Leader Eric Cantor announced that H.R. 2640 would be on the House schedule for the week of October 28, 2013. The House voted in favor of the bill on October 29, 2013.

=== Senate and President ===
The Crooked River Collaborative Water Security and Jobs Act of 2014 was passed by the United States Senate, with changes, and passed a second time as amended by the House, both on December 11, 2014, and finally signed by President Barack Obama on December 18, 2014.

== Debate and discussion ==
Arguing in favor of the bill, Rep. Walden said, "this is a no-cost, job-creating, clean energy plan, and passing it is just common-sense. The bill will create jobs in Central Oregon, cut through government red tape, provide for clean energy generation, and improve water quality and flows for fish and wildlife, all without costing the taxpayer a dime."

== See also ==
- List of bills in the 113th United States Congress
