= William Smith (Oregon politician) =

American politician

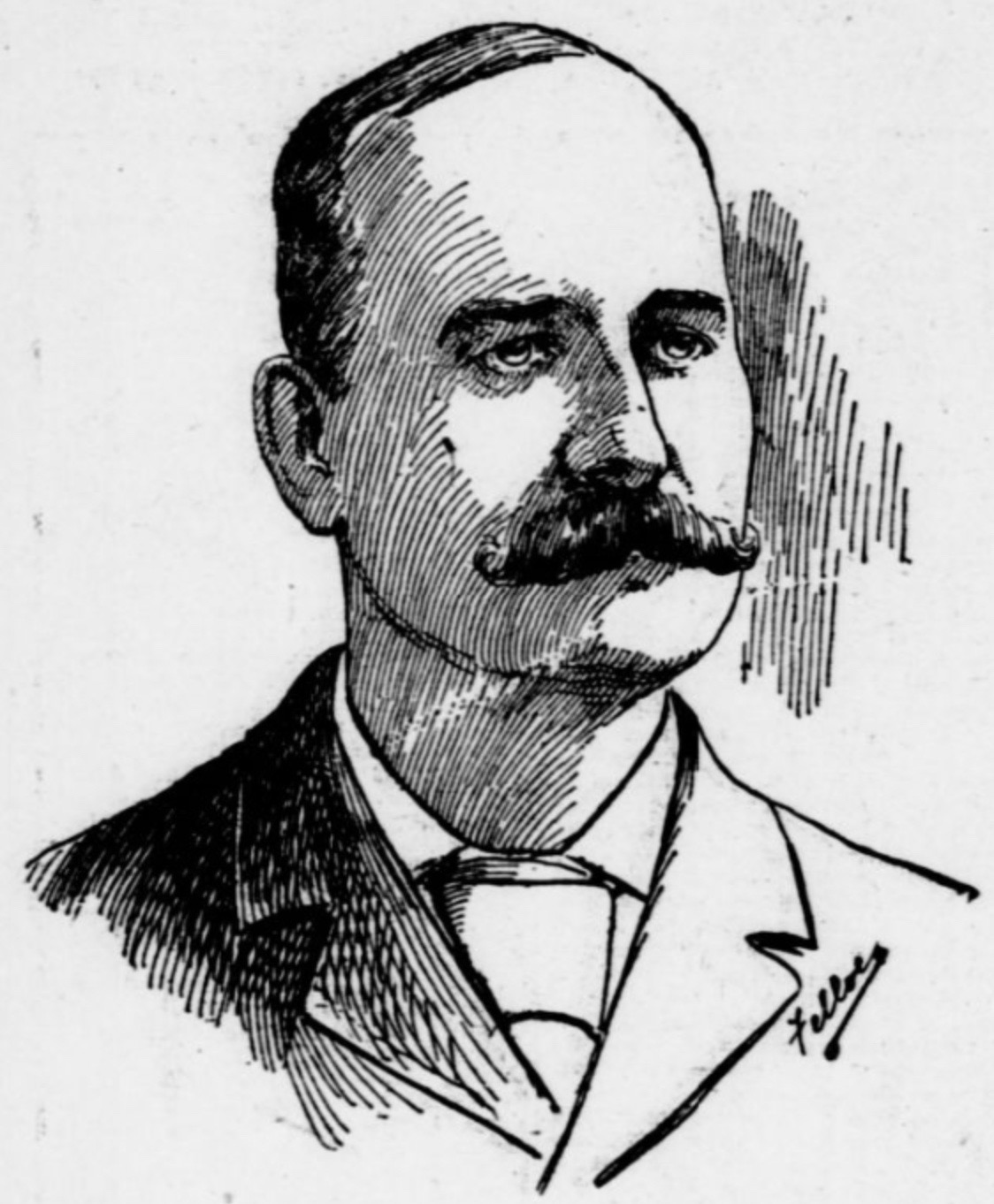

Member of the Oregon State Senate
- In office January 9, 1899 – January 12, 1903
- Constituency: Baker and Malheur counties

Personal details
- Died: unknown, after 1915
- Party: Populist

William Smith was an American lawyer and politician who served as a Populist member of the Oregon Senate from 1899 until 1903. He was also the Fusion (Democratic and Populist) nominee for Oregon's 2nd congressional district in 1900. Smith lost to incumbent Republican Malcolm A. Moody in a four-way race, receiving 32% of the vote. He practiced law with the firm Hart & Smith from 1904 until 1906.

In April 1903, Smith was appointed to the Board of Regents of the University of Oregon by Governor George E. Chamberlain, and was still serving as late as 1915.

== Early life ==
William Smith was born on April 22, 1854, in Brooklyn, New York. He was one of five children of William and Susan Davies (Thomas) Smith. When Smith was in his early childhood, his family moved to Minnesota.
