= Federal Communications Commission Process Reform Act of 2013 =

Proposed United States legislation

- Long title: To amend the Communications Act of 1934 to provide for greater transparency and efficiency in the procedures followed by the Federal Communications Commission.
- Announced in: the 113th United States Congress
- Sponsored by: Rep. Greg Walden (R, OR-2)
- Number of co-sponsors: 1

Codification
- Acts affected: Communications Act of 1934, Freedom of Information Act
- U.S.C. sections affected: 5 U.S.C. § 552b, 31 U.S.C. § 1115, 5 U.S.C. § 553, 47 U.S.C. § 227, 47 U.S.C. § 151 et seq., and others.
- Agencies affected: Federal Communications Commission

Legislative history
- Introduced in the House as H.R. 3675 by Rep. Greg Walden (R, OR-2) on December 9, 2013; Committee consideration by United States House Committee on Energy and Commerce; Passed the House on March 11, 2014 (voice vote)

The Federal Communications Commission Process Reform Act of 2013 (H.R. 3675) is a bill that would make a number of changes to procedures that the Federal Communications Commission (FCC) follows in its rulemaking processes. The FCC would have to act in a more transparent way as a result of this bill, forced to accept public input about regulations. Although the FCC would be allowed to decide on its own transparency guidelines, it would have to report annually on how well it was meeting those guidelines. The FCC would also have to provide notice about rules it was writing and allow for comment.

The bill passed in the United States House of Representatives with a voice vote during the 113th United States Congress.

== Background ==
A similar bill was considered and passed by the House during the 112th United States Congress, but failed in the Senate and had little support from the Democrats. At the time, Democrats feared the bill would hurt the FCC's power to help consumers. In order to get Democratic support for this newer version, Rep. Walden, chairman of the United States House Energy Subcommittee on Communications and Technology, removed the controversial provisions that the Democrats had opposed. Changes included the removal of provisions that limited the FCC's ability to place conditions on mergers and the lack of a requirement for newly proposed FCC rules to receive a cost-benefit analysis before imposition.

== Provisions of the bill ==
This summary is based largely on the summary provided by the Congressional Research Service, a public domain source.

The Federal Communications Commission Process Reform Act of 2013 would amend the Communications Act of 1934 to require the Federal Communications Commission (FCC) to complete a rulemaking proceeding to adopt rules establishing:

- minimum comment and reply periods for rulemakings;
- policies to ensure that the public has notice and an opportunity to respond to comments, ex parte communications, or materials submitted toward the end of, or after, the comment period;
- procedures for publishing the status of open rulemakings and items circulated for Commissioners' review;
- deadlines for public notice, and guidelines for disposition, of certain petitions; and
- procedures to include the specific language of proposed rules or amendments in proposed rulemaking notices.

The bill would require performance measures to be included in notices of proposed rulemakings or orders that would create or substantially change a program activity. Defines "program activity" as a specific activity or project as listed in the program and financing schedules of the U.S. annual budget, including any annual collection or distribution or related series of collections or distributions by the FCC of $100 million or more.

The bill would direct the FCC to seek public comment regarding whether the FCC should: (1) establish procedures for allowing a bipartisan majority of Commissioners to place items on an open meeting agenda and for publishing in advance of such meetings the text of agenda items on which the FCC will vote; (2) establish deadlines for the disposition of certain license applications; and (3) publish orders, decisions, reports, and actions within 30 days after adoption.

The bill would require the FCC to initiate a new rulemaking proceeding every five years to continue its consideration of procedural rule changes.

The bill would allow a bipartisan majority of Commissioners to hold a nonpublic meeting, including a meeting to collaborate with joint boards or conferences, if: (1) no votes or actions are taken, and (2) an attorney from the FCC's Office of General Counsel is present. Requires such a closed meeting to be disclosed within two business days after the meeting, along with a list of persons in attendance and a summary of discussed matters, provided that such matters are not classified or otherwise exempt from disclosure.

The bill would direct the FCC to provide on its website: (1) information regarding the FCC's budget, appropriations, and total number of full-time equivalent employees; (2) the FCC's annual performance plan; and (3) information about consumer complaints in a publicly available, searchable database.

The bill would direct the FCC to complete actions necessary for the required publication of documents in the Federal Register within specified time frames.

The bill would require the FCC to inform the public about its performance and efficiency in meeting disclosure and other requirements under the Freedom of Information Act (FOIA), including by: (1) publishing on the FCC website its logs for managing FOIA requests and associated fees, (2) releasing decisions to grant or deny requests, and (3) presenting information about the number of FOIA requests received and granted or denied by the FCC in its annual budget estimates and annual performance and financial reports.

The bill would direct the FCC, by January 15 of each year, to publish on its website and in other required formats an anticipated release schedule for all statistical reports and reports to Congress.

The bill would require annual reports to Congress on the FCC's performance in conducting its proceedings and meeting the deadlines and guidelines established by this Act.

The bill would prohibit the FCC, in compiling its quarterly report with respect to informal consumer inquiries and complaints, from categorizing an inquiry or complaint under the Telephone Consumer Protection Act of 1991 (places restrictions on telephone solicitations and automatic dialing systems) as a wireline or wireless inquiry or complaint unless a wireline or wireless carrier was the subject of the inquiry or complaint.

The bill would exempt permanently from the Antideficiency Act (prohibits expenditures or obligations of federal funds exceeding an amount available in an appropriation or fund) the collection of Universal Service Fund contributions and the use of such contributions for universal service support programs. (Currently, universal service funds are collected and distributed under a temporary waiver provided in the Universal Service Antideficiency Temporary Suspension Act.)

== Congressional Budget Office report ==
This summary is based largely on the summary provided by the Congressional Budget Office, as ordered reported by the House Committee on Energy and Commerce on December 10, 2013. THis is a public domain source.

H.R. 3675 would make a number of changes to procedures that the Federal Communications Commission (FCC) follows in its rulemaking processes. The bill also would require the FCC to create a public database of information about complaints made by consumers of telecommunications services. Finally, the bill would permanently exempt the Universal Service Fund (USF) from provisions of the Antideficiency Act.

The Congressional Budget Office (CBO) estimates that enacting H.R. 3675 would increase direct spending by $197 million over the 2014-2023 period; therefore, pay-as-you-go procedures apply. Enacting H.R. 3675 would not affect revenues.

Further, CBO estimates that implementing H.R. 3675 to amend the FCC's operating procedures would cost $15 million over the next five years, assuming appropriation of the necessary amounts; however, the FCC is authorized to collect fees sufficient to offset the cost of its regulatory activities each year. Therefore, CBO estimates that the net cost to implement those provisions of H.R. 3675 would not be significant, assuming annual appropriation actions consistent with the agency's authorities.

H.R. 3675 contains no intergovernmental mandates as defined in the Unfunded Mandates Reform Act and would not affect the budgets of state, local, or tribal governments.

To the extent that the FCC would increase annual fee collections to offset the costs of implementing its additional regulatory activities, the bill would impose a private-sector mandate on some commercial entities regulated by the FCC. Based on information from the FCC, CBO estimates that the cost of the mandate would be small, and fall well below the annual threshold established in UMRA for private-sector mandates ($152 million in 2014, adjusted annually for inflation).

== Procedural history ==
The Federal Communications Commission Process Reform Act of 2013 was introduced into the United States House of Representatives on December 9, 2013 by Rep. Greg Walden (R, OR-2). It was referred to the United States House Committee on Energy and Commerce. On January 31, 2014, it was reported (amended) by the committee alongside House Report 113-338. On March 7, 2014, House Majority Leader Eric Cantor announced that H.R. 311 would be considered under a suspension of the rules on March 11, 2014.

== Debate and discussion ==
The bill's sponsor, Rep. Greg Walden, indicated that the bill was written in response, among other things, to a proposed FCC study on the decisions made by newspaper editorial boards. Walden argued that "Americans deserve greater... transparency and accountability from their government," particularly because "an item as controversial as this study made it all the way through the FCC without so much as a commission vote." The study was deemed "dangerous" because it the free speech and freedom of the press rights of the newspapers.

Rep. Mike Doyle (D-PA) also argued in favor of the bill because "the FCC is charged with overseeing industries that make up one-sixth of our national economy."

Rep. Anna Eshoo (D-CA) expected Senate support for the bill, saying that they "shouldn't find it menacing" and arguing that the bill "is about the functioning of the FCC in the 21st century."

AT&T supported the bill with Executive Vice President - Federal Relations Tim McKone saying that its "much needed institutional reforms will help arm the agency with the tools to keep pace with the Internet speed of today's marketplace. It will also ensure that outmoded regulatory practices for today's competitive marketplace are properly placed in the dustbin of history."

== See also ==
- List of bills in the 113th United States Congress
