= Greg Walden =

American politician (born 1957)

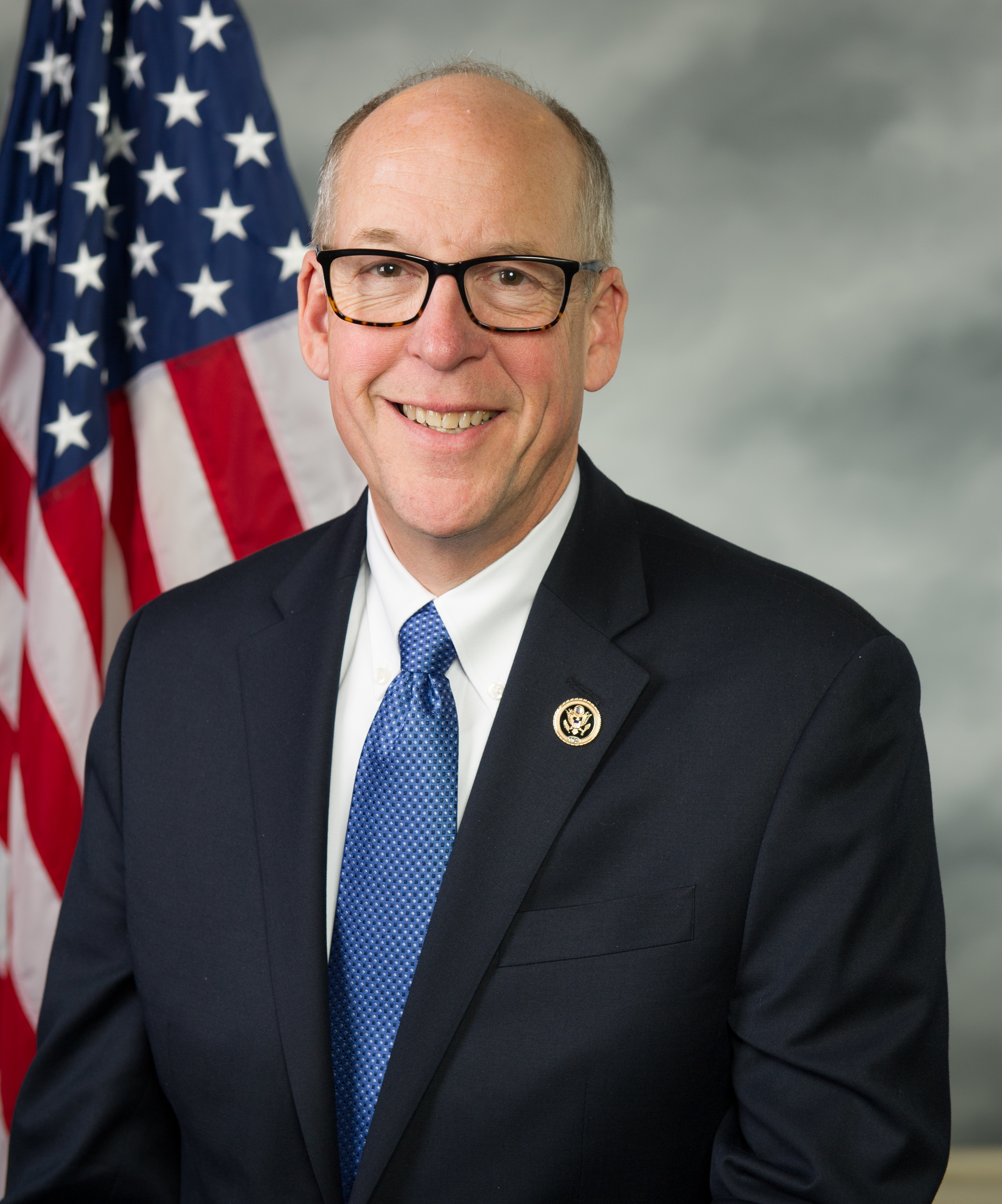

Ranking Member of the House Energy and Commerce Committee
- In office January 3, 2019 – January 3, 2021
- Preceded by: Frank Pallone
- Succeeded by: Cathy McMorris Rodgers

Chair of the House Energy and Commerce Committee
- In office January 3, 2017 – January 3, 2019
- Preceded by: Fred Upton
- Succeeded by: Frank Pallone

Chair of the National Republican Congressional Committee
- In office January 3, 2013 – January 3, 2017
- Leader: John Boehner; Paul Ryan
- Preceded by: Pete Sessions
- Succeeded by: Steve Stivers

Member of the U.S. House of Representatives from Oregon's 2nd district
- In office January 3, 1999 – January 3, 2021
- Preceded by: Bob Smith
- Succeeded by: Cliff Bentz

Member of the Oregon Senate from the 28th district
- In office January 1995 – January 1997
- Preceded by: Wes Cooley
- Succeeded by: Ted Ferrioli

Member of the Oregon House of Representatives from the 56th district
- In office January 1989 – January 1995
- Preceded by: Wayne Fawbush
- Succeeded by: Bob Montgomery

Personal details
- Born: Gregory Paul Walden; January 10, 1957 (age 69) The Dalles, Oregon, U.S.
- Party: Republican
- Spouse: Mylene Walden (m. 1982)
- Children: 1
- Education: University of Oregon (BS)
- Walden's voice Walden opening a House Energy and Commerce Committee hearing on Facebook. Recorded April 11, 2018

Gregory Paul Walden (born January 10, 1957) is an American politician who served as the U.S. representative for Oregon's 2nd congressional district from 1999 to 2021. He is a Republican. Walden is the son of three-term Oregon State Representative Paul E. Walden. In October 2019, Walden announced that he would not run for reelection in 2020.

== Early life, education, and career ==
Walden was born in The Dalles, Oregon, the son of Elizabeth (née McEwen) and Paul Walden. He earned a Bachelor of Science degree at the University of Oregon in 1981. Before being elected to Congress, Walden owned and ran radio stations.

== Political career ==
Walden served as press secretary and chief of staff to Congressman Denny Smith from 1981 to 1987. He was elected to the Oregon House of Representatives in 1988 and served in the House until 1995, when he was appointed to the Oregon State Senate to fill a vacancy that opened up when Wes Cooley was elected to the U. S. House. Walden rose to the position of assistant majority leader in the Senate and was considering a bid for Oregon Governor in 1994. But upon discovering that the son he and his wife were expecting had a heart defect, Walden decided to not run for governor or seek reelection to the state senate. Their son died soon after birth.

Walden was tapped as campaign manager for Cooley's reelection bid, but after Cooley was caught in several lies about his military service, Walden was one of many Republicans who called on Cooley to drop out of the race. Walden went as far as to announce he was running for the 2nd District seat as an independent. But he served as the Oregon chairman of Bob Dole's presidential campaign, and touted his "strong Republican credentials", implying that he would serve as a Republican if elected. Walden's candidacy led to fears that the Democrats could take advantage of a split in the Republican vote and take a seat they hadn't held since 1981. This ended when Cooley's predecessor, Bob Smith, was called out of retirement.

Smith did not run for reelection in 1998. Walden easily won the Republican primary and the November general election. His district contains some liberal-leaning communities such as Ashland and his hometown, Hood River, but most of it leans heavily Republican, and Walden was reelected ten times without serious difficulty. He only received less than 60% of the vote once, in 2018 when he received 56%. In 2002, he defeated Democrat Peter Buckley, who later became a member of the Oregon House of Representatives. In 2006, Walden defeated Democratic nominee Carol Voisin, and in 2008 he won a sixth term with 70% of the vote over Democrat Noah Lemas and Pacific Green Tristin Mock. After Senator Gordon Smith's defeat in the 2008 elections, Walden became the only Republican representing Oregon in Congress.

On October 28, 2019, Walden announced that he would not run for reelection. He disagreed with President Donald Trump over Trump's attempts to finance his border wall project and backed sanctioning Russia despite Trump's resistance. He voted to end the 35-day government shutdown and spoke up about the global warming crisis, but supported Trump in the Ukraine quid pro quo scandal.

== U.S. House of Representatives ==
=== Party leadership ===
House Speaker John Boehner chose Walden to be chairman of the House Majority Transition Committee. He served as chairman of the House Republican leadership through most of 2010.

After the 2012 elections, Walden became chair of the National Republican Congressional Committee. In July 2014, he announced he would seek a second term as chair, arguing he would help provide continuity in a changing leadership team after the defeat of House Majority Leader Eric Cantor. He served a second term, the traditional limit for holders of the office, ending in 2016.

=== Committee assignments ===
- Committee on Energy and Commerce
  - Subcommittee on Communications and Technology (Chairman)
  - Subcommittee on Energy and Power

From 2010 to 2011, Walden gave up his seat on the Committee on Energy and Commerce at Republican leadership's request so that Parker Griffith, who had recently switched parties, could take his spot.

Walden founded the Small Brewers Caucus and the Digital Television Caucus; as of 2007, he was a member of 39 congressional caucuses.

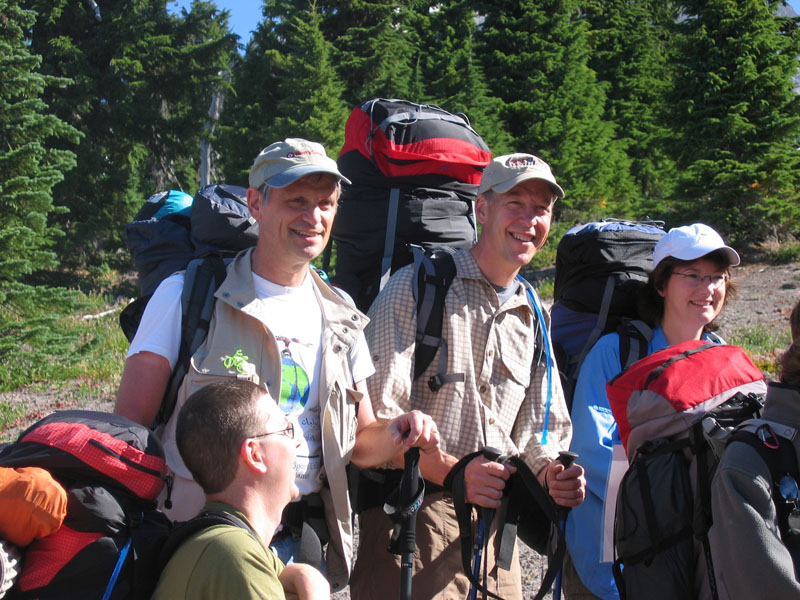
Oregon Congressmen Earl Blumenauer (left) and Walden, hiking on Mount Hood during a 2005 fact-finding trip

Walden was also a member of the centrist Republican Main Street Partnership, the Congressional Cement Caucus and the Congressional Western Caucus.

=== Sponsored legislation ===
The following is an incomplete list of legislation Walden has introduced into the House of Representatives.

- Central Oregon Jobs and Water Security Act (H.R. 2640; 113th Congress), a land-use and water bill related to the Crooked River in Oregon and the Bowman Dam. H.R. 2640 would modify features of the Crooked River Project in central Oregon, near Prineville, and prioritize how water from the project is allocated. President Barack Obama signed the bill into law in December 2014.
- Federal Communications Commission Process Reform Act of 2013 (H.R. 3675; 113th Congress), a bill that would make a number of changes to procedures that the Federal Communications Commission (FCC) follows in its rule-making processes. The FCC would have to act in more transparently and accept public input on regulations. Walden said the bill was written in response, among other things, to a proposed FCC study on the newspaper editorial boards' decisions. Walden argued that "Americans deserve greater... transparency and accountability from their government," particularly because "an item as controversial as this study made it all the way through the FCC without so much as a commission vote." He called the study dangerous because it threatened the papers' free speech and freedom of the press rights.
- Hermiston Reversionary Interest Release Act (H.R. 3366; 113th Congress), a bill that would release the interest of the United States in some land being used for Oregon State University's Agricultural Research and Extension Center in Hermiston, Oregon. This would enable the center to relocate without its land being returned to the federal government. The Bureau of Land Management opposed the bill and it died in the Senate Committee on Energy and Natural Resources.
- STELA Reauthorization Act of 2014 (H.R. 4572; 113th Congress), a bill related to the regulation of satellite broadcasting.

=== Malheur Wildlife Refuge ===
Walden, whose district office includes the Malheur National Wildlife Refuge, said that although one militant was killed and another wounded in the armed occupation of the refuge, "We can all be grateful that today has ended peacefully, and that this situation is finally over. Now, life in Harney County can begin to return to normal and the community can begin the long process of healing." He complained about allegedly poor federal forest and land management policies during the occupation, and said he would like to see changes to those policies: "We need to foster a more cooperative spirit between the federal agencies and the people who call areas like Harney County home." On June 27, 2018, Walden pleaded for a pardon for Dwight and Steven Hammond, who repeatedly committed arson and threatened federal refuge workers over an 18-year period, saying that the original trial's federal judge, Michael Robert Hogan, said that the mandatory sentence would "shock the conscious [sic]". On July 10, Trump pardoned both men, commuting their sentences to time served. Steven had been scheduled to be released on June 29, 2019, and Dwight on February 13, 2020.

== Personal life ==
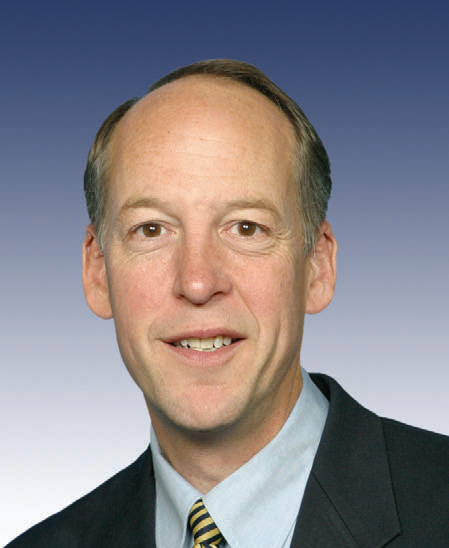
Walden during the 109th Congress

Walden and his wife, Mylene, live in Hood River with their son Anthony. They participate in local civic groups such as the Rotary Club and the Chamber of Commerce.

Walden was a licensed amateur (ham) radio operator, W7EQI.

On January 31, 2007, Walden sold Columbia Gorge Broadcasting, which runs five stations in the eastern Columbia River Gorge, to Bicoastal Columbia River LLC in order to avoid any conflict of interest that might arise with his congressional duties.

Walden is an Episcopalian. He is a board member for American Edge, a lobbying organization for the technology industry. In 2022, it was reported in The Wall Street Journal that Walden was hired by Mindbloom, a telemedicine-based ketamine-assisted therapy company, for the purpose of lobbying on telehealth policies.

== Electoral history ==
Greg Walden General Electoral Results 1998–2018
Year	Democrat	Votes	Pct	Republican	Votes	Pct	Other party	Other votes	Other pct
2018	Jamie McLeod-Skinner	145,298	39.41%	√ Greg Walden	207,597	56.30%	Mark R. Roberts (Independent)	15,536	4.21%
2016	Jim Crary	106,640	27.29%	√ Greg Walden	272,952	69.87%	No candidate		
2014	Aelea Christofferson	73,785	25.67%	√ Greg Walden	202,374	70.41%	Sharon Durbin (Libertarian)	10,491	3.65%
2012	Joyce B. Segers	96,741	29.16%	√ Greg Walden	228,043	68.73%	Joe Tabor (Libertarian)	7,025	2.12%
2010	Joyce B. Segers	72,173	25.86%	√ Greg Walden	206,245	73.91%	No candidate		
2008	Noah Lemas	87,649	25.75%	√ Greg Walden	236,560	69.49%	Richard D. Hake (Constitution)	5,817	1.70%
2008	Noah Lemas	87,649	25.75%	√ Greg Walden	236,560	69.49%	Tristin Mock (Green)	9,668	2.84%
2006	Carol Voisin	82,484	30.35%	√ Greg Walden	181,529	66.80%	Jack Allen Brown Jr. (Constitution)	7,193	2.64%
2004	John C. McColgan	88,914	25.63%	√ Greg Walden	248,461	71.64%	Jim Lindsay (Libertarian)	4,792	1.38%
2004	John C. McColgan	88,914	25.63%	√ Greg Walden	248,461	71.64%	Jack Allen Brown Jr. (Constitution)	4,060	1.17%
2002	Peter Buckley	64,991	25.76%	√ Greg Walden	181,295	71.86%	Mike Wood (Libertarian)	5,681	2.25%
2000	Walter Ponsford	78,101	26.12%	√ Greg Walden	220,086	73.63%	No candidate		
1998	Kevin M. Campbell	74,924	34.81%	√ Greg Walden	132,316	61.48%	Lindsey Bradshaw (Libertarian)	4,729	2.19%
1998	Kevin M. Campbell	74,924	34.81%	√ Greg Walden	132,316	61.48%	Rohn Webb (Socialist)	2,773	1.28%

U.S. House of Representatives
Preceded by Bob Smith	Member of the U.S. House of Representatives from Oregon's 2nd congressional district 1999–2021	Succeeded by Cliff Bentz
Preceded by Fred Upton	Chair of the House Energy Committee; 2017–2019	Succeeded by Frank Pallone
Preceded by Frank Pallone	Ranking Member of the House Energy Committee; 2019–2021	Succeeded by Cathy McMorris Rodgers
Party political offices
Vacant Title last held by Rob Portman; 2005	Chair of House Republican Leadership; 2010–2013	Vacant Title next held by Garret Graves; 2023 as Chair of the House Republican Elected Leadership Committee
Preceded by Pete Sessions	Chair of the National Republican Congressional Committee; 2013–2017	Succeeded by Steve Stivers
U.S. order of precedence (ceremonial)
Preceded by Buck McKeon as Former U.S. Representative	Order of precedence of the United States as Former U.S. Representative	Succeeded by Bob Walker as Former U.S. Representative
