= Walter Lafferty =

American politician (1875–1964)

A. W. Lafferty
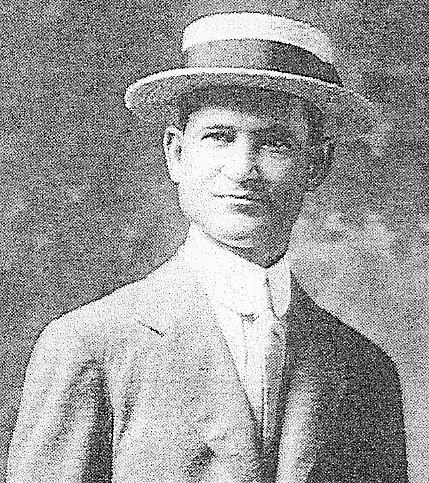
- A. W. Lafferty in 1913

Member of the U.S. House of Representatives from Oregon
- In office March 4, 1911 – March 3, 1915
- Preceded by: William R. Ellis (2nd); District established (3rd)
- Succeeded by: Nicholas J. Sinnott (2nd); Clifton N. McArthur (3rd)
- Constituency: 2nd district (1911-13); 3rd district (1913-15)

Personal details
- Born: June 10, 1875 Farber, Missouri, U.S.
- Died: January 15, 1964 (aged 88) Portland, Oregon, U.S.
- Party: Republican
- Occupation: attorney

Abraham Walter Lafferty (June 10, 1875 – January 15, 1964) was a U.S. representative from the state of Oregon. Lafferty spent the majority of his career both as a legislator and as an attorney attempting to have millions of acres of land previously owned by the Oregon and California Railroad come under Oregon state control, rather than the control of the U.S. federal government.

== Early life ==
Lafferty grew up in Missouri. He was born near Farber to Abraham M. and Helen Kinney Lafferty. He attended public schools in Pike County and went on to study law at the University of Missouri, graduating in 1896. He was admitted to the bar that year and commenced practice in Montgomery City. He served as prosecuting attorney of Montgomery County from 1902 to 1904. He also served three years as a captain in the Missouri National Guard.

== Move to Oregon ==
In 1905, he was appointed special agent for the United States Department of the Interior's United States General Land Office in Portland, Oregon. He served in that position for a year before resigning to open a law practice in Portland.

In 1907, Lafferty took a case that would define the rest of his career: representing 18 western Oregon counties against the Oregon and California Railroad to claim timber revenue from, and possession of, the O&C lands formerly granted to the railroad by the U.S. government. In 1870, the United States government had granted the railroad three million acres (12,000 km^{2}) of land to build a line from Portland south to California. The railroad was to sell land to settlers at $2.50 an acre, but widespread abuse resulted in developers, aided by politicians, acquiring large parcels through fraudulent means in what became known as the Oregon land fraud scandal. Then in 1903, the Southern Pacific Railroad, which had acquired the O&C, had stopped selling the parcels altogether. Lafferty fought the case for years and in 1915, it ended when the U.S. government took back control of the land, paying the railroad $2.50 per acre for the land. Lafferty did not consider this a victory since the railroad was compensated and the state of Oregon did not get possession of the land.

== Congressional career ==
With his fame earned from this case, in 1910, Lafferty was elected as a Republican to the United States House of Representatives, representing Oregon's 2nd congressional district. In 1912, after Oregon was granted another congressional district based on the 1910 census, he was elected to represent Oregon's 3rd congressional district, running as both a Republican and a Progressive, allying himself with Progressive Presidential candidate Theodore Roosevelt. Lafferty identified himself as a Progressive Republican for the 63rd United States Congress. While in Congress, Lafferty continued his fight on behalf of his constituents affected by the railroad land issue. He also supported equal suffrage for men and women.

When a "vice scandal" broke out in Portland in November 1912 surrounding the city's gay male subculture, Lafferty vowed to bring the scandal to Washington's attention, though his efforts were short-lived.

In 1914, Lafferty again ran for the Republican nomination for his seat, but was defeated in the primary by Clifton N. McArthur. Despite the loss, Lafferty ran in the general election as an Independent Progressive, but McArthur prevailed by a slim plurality over Lafferty, Democrat Austin F. Flegel, and Progressive Arthur Moulton. In 1916, the situation repeated itself: Lafferty sought the Republican nomination and lost to McArthur, and then ran as an Independent in the general election. As before, McArthur again defeated him, along with Democrat John J. Jeffery.

== After Congress ==
Rep. A.W. Lafferty decked out for a game of Congressional baseball.

Following his defeat in 1916, he resumed his Portland law practice until World War I, when he served as a major at a San Francisco training camp.

Lafferty, who never married, was dogged by several scandals during his political career. During his first term in Congress, he solicited the acquaintance of two young women to whom he had not been formerly introduced, including the daughter of a federal official, in violation of social norms of the times. He was forced to apologize for his actions. Several years later, in 1919, Lafferty was indicted by a Multnomah County grand jury for contributing to the delinquency of a 14-year-old girl. Lafferty, who was in New York City at the time of the indictment, did not return to Oregon to face the misdemeanor charge. He opened a law practice in New York, where he lived for the next 14 years.

In 1933, he purchased the historic Riversdale Mansion in Riverdale, Maryland, living there until he sold it to the Maryland-National Capital Park and Planning Commission in 1949.

== Return to Oregon ==
Lafferty returned to Portland in 1946 and resumed his court fight on behalf of the O&C land grant counties. After the federal government had assumed control of the land following Lafferty's original case, the U.S. Congress had passed legislation in 1916 and 1937 that directed the federal government to pay half of their timber revenues to the O&C counties, a number that was reduced over the years. On April 30, 1954, Lafferty won a successful appeal to return $6 million in timber revenue to the O&C counties. However, Congress passed a further act that gave control of those lands to the U.S. Forest Service and the U.S. Supreme Court refused to hear Lafferty's appeal that his case had precedence. Lafferty would continue to fight the case, and for payment for his services, for the rest of his life.

When not fighting in court, Lafferty continued to try to reclaim his old seat in Congress. To reintroduce himself to constituents after his lengthy absence from Oregon, Lafferty launched a series of advertisements that featured an unusual assortment of information, such as excerpts from letters, snippets of poetry, pictures of notables such as Abraham Lincoln, and references to his fight for the O&C counties. All of his attempts, as an Independent in 1950 and as a Republican in 1952, 1954, and 1956, were unsuccessful.

== Death ==
Lafferty died in Portland on January 15, 1964, after several weeks of failing health. At the time of his death, he was still seeking full payment for his fees from his court cases on behalf of the O&C counties and owed several hundred thousand dollars in back taxes. He was interred in Fairmount Cemetery in Middletown, Missouri.

U.S. House of Representatives
Preceded by William R. Ellis	Member of the U.S. House of Representatives from Oregon's 2nd congressional district March 4, 1911 – March 3, 1915	Succeeded by Nicholas J. Sinnott
Preceded by District created	Member of the U.S. House of Representatives from Oregon's 3rd congressional district March 4, 1913 – March 3, 1915	Succeeded by Clifton N. McArthur
