= Oregon's 2nd congressional district =

U.S. House district for Oregon

Coordinates: 44°N 120°W

- Interactive map of district boundaries since January 3, 2023
- Representative: Cliff Bentz; R–Ontario
- Area: 69,491 mi^{2} (179,980 km^{2})
- Population (2025): 718,046
- Median household income: $73,586
- Ethnicity: 75.4% White; 14.5% Hispanic; 5.6% Two or more races; 2.0% Native American; 1.0% Asian; 0.8% other; 0.6% Black
- Occupation: 54% White-collar; 29.1% Blue-collar; 17% Gray-collar
- Cook PVI: R+14

Oregon's 2nd congressional district is the largest of Oregon's six districts, and is the fifth largest district in the nation. It is the second-largest congressional district in the nation that does not cover an entire state, and has been represented by Republican Cliff Bentz of Ontario since 2021.

The district covers roughly two-thirds of the state, east of the Willamette Valley. It includes all of Baker, Crook, Gilliam, Grant, Harney, Hood River, Jackson, Josephine, Klamath, Lake, Malheur, Morrow, Sherman, Umatilla, Union, Wallowa, Wasco, Wheeler counties, all but a small sliver of Jefferson County, the southeastern portions of Deschutes and Douglas counties, and small, unincorporated portions of Clackamas and Marion counties.

With a Cook Partisan Voting Index rating of R+14, it is the sole reliably Republican district in Oregon. It has been in Republican hands since 1981.

== Recent election results from statewide races ==
Year	Office	Results
2008	President	McCain 56–41%
2012	President	Romney 61–39%
2016	President	Trump 59–31%
2016	Senate	Wyden 48–43%
2016	Governor (spec.)	Pierce 58–35%
2016	Attorney General	Crowe 59–38%
2018	Governor	Buehler 60–31%
2020	President	Trump 61–36%
2020	Senate	Rae Perkins 58–38%
2020	Secretary of State	Thatcher 62–33%
2020	Treasurer	Gudman 59–34%
2020	Attorney General	Cross 61–37%
2022	Senate	Rae Perkins 60–37%
2022	Governor	Drazan 64–27%
2024	President	Trump 62–35%
2024	Secretary of State	Linthicum 63–35%
2024	Treasurer	Boquist 63–31%
2024	Attorney General	Lathrop 66–34%

== Composition ==
For the 118th and successive Congresses (based on redistricting following the 2020 census), the district contains all or portions of the following counties and communities:

Baker County (8)

All 8 communities

Clackamas County (0)

No incorporated or census-recognized communities

Crook County (4)

All 4 communities

Deschutes County (9)

Bend (part; also 5th), La Pine, Three Rivers (part; also 5th)

Douglas County (6)

Canyonville, Days Creek, Glendale, Myrtle Creek, Riddle, Tri-City

Gilliam County (9)

All 9 communities

Grant County (10)

All 10 communities

Harney County (3)

All 3 communities

Jackson County (17)

All 17 communities

Jefferson County (6)

All 6 communities

Josephine County (11)

All 11 communities

Klamath County (20)

All 20 communities

Malheur County (9)

All 9 communities

Marion County (0)

No incorporated or census-recognized communities

Morrow County (5)

All 5 communities

Sherman County (5)

All 5 communities

Umatilla County (22)

All 22 communities

Union County (8)

All 8 communities

Wallowa County (5)

All 5 communities

Wasco County (13)

All 13 communities

Wheeler County (3)

All 3 communities

== List of members representing the district ==
Member	Party	Years	Cong ess	Electoral history
District established March 4, 1893
William R. Ellis (Heppner)	Republican	March 4, 1893 – March 3, 1899	53rd 54th 55th	Elected in 1892. Re-elected in 1894. Re-elected in 1896. Lost renomination.
Malcolm A. Moody (The Dalles)	Republican	March 4, 1899 – March 3, 1903	56th 57th	Elected in 1898. Re-elected in 1900. Lost renomination.
John N. Williamson (Prineville)	Republican	March 4, 1903 – March 3, 1907	58th 59th	Elected in 1902; Re-elected in 1904. Retired.
William R. Ellis (Pendleton)	Republican	March 4, 1907 – March 3, 1911	60th 61st	Elected in 1906. Re-elected in 1908. Lost renomination.
Walter Lafferty (Portland)	Republican	March 4, 1911 – March 3, 1913	62nd	Elected in 1910. Redistricted to the 3rd district.
Nicholas J. Sinnott (The Dalles)	Republican	March 4, 1913 – May 31, 1928	63rd 64th 65th 66th 67th 68th 69th 70th	Elected in 1912. Re-elected in 1914. Re-elected in 1916. Re-elected in 1918. Re-elected in 1920. Re-elected in 1922. Re-elected in 1924. Re-elected in 1926. Resigned to become judge to the U.S. Court of Claims.
Vacant		May 31, 1928 – November 6, 1928	70th	
Robert R. Butler (The Dalles)	Republican	November 6, 1928 – January 7, 1933	70th 71st 72nd	Elected to finish Sinnott's term. Also elected to the next full term. Re-elected in 1930. Lost re-election and died before next term began.
Vacant		January 7, 1933 – March 3, 1933	72nd	
Walter M. Pierce (La Grande)	Democratic	March 4, 1933 – January 3, 1943	73rd 74th 75th 76th 77th	Elected in 1932. Re-elected in 1934. Re-elected in 1936. Re-elected in 1938. Re-elected in 1940. Lost re-election.
Lowell Stockman (Pendleton)	Republican	January 3, 1943 – January 3, 1953	78th 79th 80th 81st 82nd	Elected in 1942. Re-elected in 1944. Re-elected in 1946. Re-elected in 1948. Re-elected in 1950. Retired.
Sam Coon (Baker)	Republican	January 3, 1953 – January 3, 1957	83rd 84th	Elected in 1952. Re-elected in 1954. Lost re-election.
Al Ullman (Baker)	Democratic	January 3, 1957 – January 3, 1981	85th 86th 87th 88th 89th 90th 91st 92nd 93rd 94th 95th 96th	Elected in 1956. Re-elected in 1958. Re-elected in 1960. Re-elected in 1962. Re-elected in 1964. Re-elected in 1966. Re-elected in 1968. Re-elected in 1970. Re-elected in 1972. Re-elected in 1974. Re-elected in 1976. Re-elected in 1978. Lost re-election.
Denny Smith (Salem)	Republican	January 3, 1981 – January 3, 1983	97th	Elected in 1980. Redistricted to the 5th district.
Robert F. Smith (Burns)	Republican	January 3, 1983 – January 3, 1995	98th 99th 100th 101st 102nd 103rd	Elected in 1982. Re-elected in 1984. Re-elected in 1986. Re-elected in 1988. Re-elected in 1990. Re-elected in 1992. Retired.
Wes Cooley (Alfalfa)	Republican	January 3, 1995 – January 3, 1997	104th	Elected in 1994. Renominated but withdrew prior to election.
Robert F. Smith (Medford)	Republican	January 3, 1997 – January 3, 1999	105th	Elected in 1996. Retired.
Greg Walden (Hood River)	Republican	January 3, 1999 – January 3, 2021	106th 107th 108th 109th 110th 111th 112th 113th 114th 115th 116th	Elected in 1998. Re-elected in 2000. Re-elected in 2002. Re-elected in 2004. Re-elected in 2006. Re-elected in 2008. Re-elected in 2010. Re-elected in 2012. Re-elected in 2014. Re-elected in 2016. Re-elected in 2018. Retired.
Cliff Bentz (Ontario)	Republican	January 3, 2021 – present	117th 118th 119th	Elected in 2020. Re-elected in 2022. Re-elected in 2024. Re-elected in 2026.

== Election results ==
Sources (official results only):

- Elections History from the Oregon Secretary of State website
- Election Statistics from the website of the Clerk of the United States House of Representatives

=== 1996 ===
United States House election, 1996: Oregon district 2
Party	Candidate	Votes	%
Republican	Robert F. Smith	164,062	61.66
Democratic	Mike Dugan	97,195	36.53
Libertarian	Frank Wise	4,581	1.72
Misc.	Misc.	218	0.01

=== 1998 ===
United States House election, 1998: Oregon district 2
Party	Candidate	Votes	%
Republican	Greg Walden	132,316	61.48
Democratic	Kevin M. Campbell	74,924	34.81
Libertarian	Lindsay Bradshaw	4,729	2.20
Socialist	Rohn (Grandpa) Webb	2,773	1.29
Misc.	Misc.	474	0.22

=== 2000 ===
United States House election, 2000: Oregon district 2
Party	Candidate	Votes	%
Republican	Greg Walden (incumbent)	220,086	73.63
Democratic	Walter Ponsford	78,101	26.13
Misc.	Misc.	720	0.24

=== 2002 ===
United States House election, 2002: Oregon district 2
Party	Candidate	Votes	%
Republican	Greg Walden (incumbent)	181,295	71.86
Democratic	Peter Buckley	64,991	25.76
Libertarian	Mike Wood (American politician)	5,681	2.25
Misc.	Misc.	317	0.13

=== 2004 ===
United States House election, 2004: Oregon district 2
Party	Candidate	Votes	%
Republican	Greg Walden (incumbent)	248,461	71.63
Democratic	John C. McColgan	88,914	25.63
Libertarian	Jim Lindsay	4,792	1.38
Constitution	Jack Alan Brown, Jr.	4,060	1.17
Misc.	Misc.	638	0.18

=== 2006 ===
United States House election, 2006: Oregon district 2
Party	Candidate	Votes	%
Republican	Greg Walden (incumbent)	181,529	66.81
Democratic	Carol Voisin	82,484	30.36
Constitution	Jack Alan Brown, Jr.	7,193	2.65
Misc.	Misc.	513	0.19

=== 2008 ===
United States House election, 2008: Oregon district 2
Party	Candidate	Votes	%
Republican	Greg Walden (incumbent)	236,560	69.50
Democratic	Noah Lemas	87,649	25.75
Pacific Green	Tristan Mock	9,668	2.84
Constitution	Richard Hake	5,817	1.71
Misc.	Misc.	685	0.20

=== 2010 ===
United States House election, 2010: Oregon district 2
Party	Candidate	Votes	%
Republican	Greg Walden (incumbent)	206,245	73.91
Democratic	Joyce B. Segers	72,173	25.87
Misc.	Misc.	619	0.22

=== 2012 ===
United States House election, 2012: Oregon district 2
Party	Candidate	Votes	%
Republican	Greg Walden (incumbent)	228,043	68.63
Democratic	Joyce B. Segers	96,741	29.12
Libertarian	Joe Tabor	7,025	2.11
	write-ins	446	0.13
Total votes		332,255	100

=== 2014 ===
United States House election, 2014: Oregon district 2
Party	Candidate	Votes	%
Republican	Greg Walden (incumbent)	202,374	70.41
Democratic	Aelea Christofferson	73,785	25.67
Libertarian	Sharon L. Durbin	10,491	3.65
	write-ins	775	0.27
Total votes		287,425	100

=== 2016 ===
United States House election, 2016: Oregon district 2
Party	Candidate	Votes	%
Republican	Greg Walden (incumbent)	272,952	71.69
Democratic	James "Jim" Crary	106,640	28.00
Total votes		380,739	100

=== 2018 ===
United States House election, 2018: Oregon district 2
Party	Candidate	Votes	%	±%
Republican	Greg Walden (incumbent)	207,597	56.3	−15.39
Democratic	Jamie McLeod-Skinner	145,298	39.4	+11.4
Independent Party	Mark Roberts	15,536	4.2	N/A
Total votes		368,709	100	

=== 2020 ===
United States House election, 2020: Oregon district 2
Party	Candidate	Votes	%
Republican	Cliff Bentz	273,835	59.9
Democratic	Alex Spenser	168,881	36.9
Libertarian	Robert Werch	14,094	3.1
Write-in		623	0.1
Total votes		457,433	100

=== 2022 ===
United States House election, 2022: Oregon district 2
Party	Candidate	Votes	%
Republican	Cliff Bentz (incumbent)	208,369	67.5
Democratic	Joseph Yetter III	99,882	32.4
Write-in		425	0.1
Total votes		308,676	100

=== 2024 ===
2024 United States House election: Oregon district 2
Party	Candidate	Votes	%
Republican	Cliff Bentz (incumbent)	224,601	63.9
Democratic	Dan Ruby	115,337	32.8
Constitution	Michael Kurt Stettler	11,255	3.2
Write-in		296	0.1
Total votes		351,489	100%

== Major communities ==
Due to its large geographical area, the 2nd district contains many different communities which operate completely independently from one another socially and economically. Below is a list of the largest statistical areas in the 2nd district tracked by the United States Census Bureau.

Core based statistical area	2020 census
Medford MSA	223,259
Bend MSA	198,253
Hermiston-Pendleton MSA	92,261
Grants Pass MSA	88,090
Klamath Falls MSA	69,413
Ontario MSA	56,957
La Grande MSA	26,196
The Dalles MSA	26,670
Hood River MSA	23,977

== Historical district boundaries ==
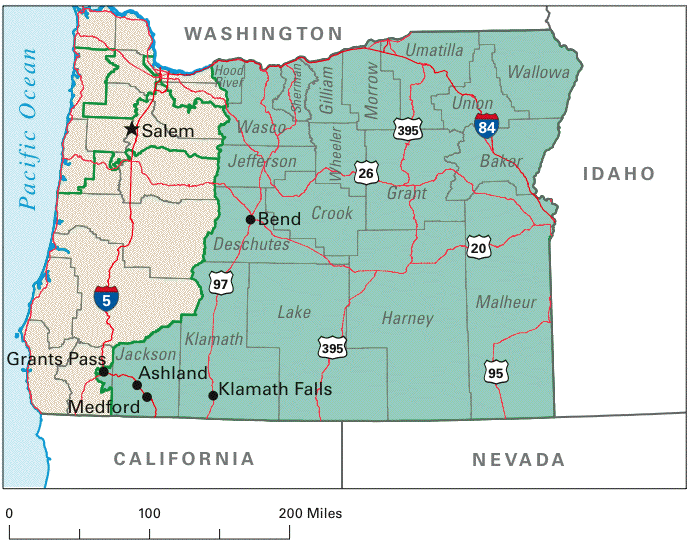
2003–2013

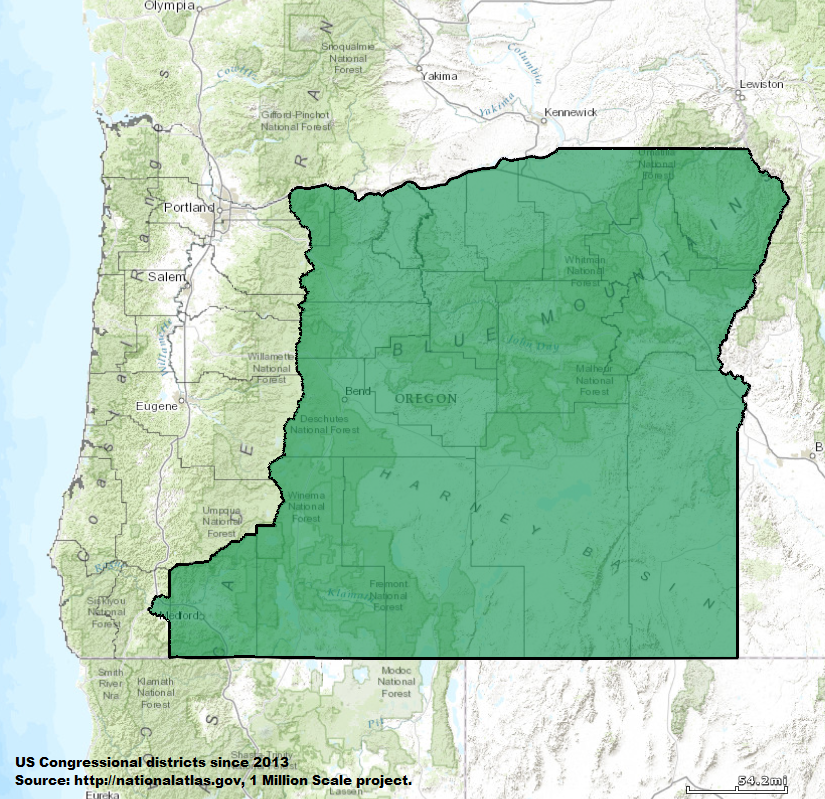
2013–2023

Prior to the 2000 United States census, most of Josephine County was part of the district. After the 2010 United States census, the district boundaries were changed slightly to move some parts of Grants Pass from the 2nd to the 4th district.

== See also ==
- Oregon's congressional districts
- List of United States congressional districts
