= Lowell Stockman =

American politician (1901–1962)

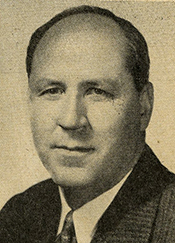

Member of the U.S. House of Representatives from Oregon's 2nd district
- In office January 3, 1943 – January 3, 1953
- Preceded by: Walter M. Pierce
- Succeeded by: Sam Coon

Personal details
- Born: April 12, 1901 Helix, Oregon, U.S.
- Died: August 9, 1962 (aged 61) Bellevue, Washington, U.S.
- Party: Republican
- Spouse: Dorcas Conklin
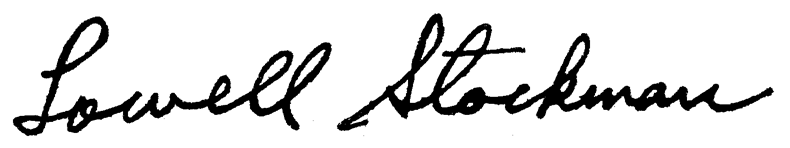
- Signature

Lowell Stockman (April 12, 1901 – August 9, 1962) was a representative from Oregon to the United States House of Representatives from 1943 to 1953.

== Early life ==
Stockman was born on a farm near Helix, Oregon. He attended public schools at Pendleton, Oregon, and graduated from Oregon State University at Corvallis in 1922. He engaged in wheat farming in Eastern Oregon's Umatilla County beginning in 1922.

== Politics ==
While in Eastern Oregon, Stockman became a member of the Pendleton School Board and the Oregon Liquor Control Commission.

Stockman was elected as a Republican to the Seventy-eighth and to the four succeeding Congresses (January 3, 1943 - January 3, 1953), but was not a candidate for renomination in 1952. He resumed farming until 1959, while a member of the Theodore Roosevelt Centennial Commission between 1956 and 1959. He became the vice president of Oregon Fiber Products, Inc. and the treasurer of Pilot Rock Lumber Company. He moved to Bellevue, Washington in 1959 and operated a trailer court until his death August 9, 1962. He was buried on University of Washington property near Pack Forest, Washington.

== Family ==
Lowell's parents were W.J. Stockman and the former Miss Etta Edmiston. He was married in 1924 to Dorcas Conklin and the couple had two daughters and one son.

U.S. House of Representatives
Preceded by Walter M. Pierce	U.S. Representative of Oregon's 2nd congressional district 1943–1953	Succeeded by Sam Coon
