= Hermiston Reversionary Interest Release Act =

- Long title: To provide for the release of the property interests retained by the United States in certain land conveyed in 1954 by the United States, acting through the Director of the Bureau of Land Management, to the State of Oregon for the establishment of the Hermiston Agricultural Research and Extension Center of Oregon State University in Hermiston, Oregon.
- Announced in: the 113th United States Congress
- Sponsored by: Rep. Greg Walden (R, OR-2)
- Number of co-sponsors: 0

Codification
- Agencies affected: United States Department of the Interior, Bureau of Land Management

Legislative history
- Introduced in the House as H.R. 3366 by Rep. Greg Walden (R, OR-2) on October 29, 2013; Committee consideration by United States House Committee on Natural Resources, United States House Natural Resources Subcommittee on Public Lands and Environmental Regulation; Passed the House on May 28, 2014 (voice vote)

The Hermiston Reversionary Interest Release Act (H.R. 3366) is a bill that would release the interest of the United States in some land currently being used for the Hermiston Agricultural Research and Extension Center in Oregon. This would enable the Hermiston Agricultural Research and Extension Center to relocate without the land it is currently on being returned to the federal government.

The bill passed the United States House of Representatives during the 113th United States Congress.

== Background ==
According to the Bureau of Land Management (BLM), it "regularly leases and conveys lands to local governments and nonprofit entities for a variety of public purposes." Those organizations agree to use the land for a public purpose and are able to purchase it at below market value, provided that they return the land or pay the cost difference if they decide to use the land to do something else.

In 1950, Pub. L. 81–825 ordered the BLM to turn over some land in Oregon over to the state of Oregon for agricultural experiments, with the United States keeping all mineral rights. Those lands are now the subject of this bill.

== Provisions of the bill ==
This summary is based largely on the summary provided by the Congressional Research Service, a public domain source.

The Hermiston Reversionary Interest Release Act would release without consideration any reservation or reversionary interest retained by the United States in connection with the conveyance of certain land by the United States to Oregon depicted as "Reversionary Interest Area" on the map entitled "Hermiston Agricultural Research and Extension Center" dated July 23, 2013.

== Congressional Budget Office report ==
This summary is based largely on the summary provided by the Congressional Budget Office, as ordered reported by the House Committee on Natural Resources on March 18, 2014. This is a public domain source.

H.R. 3366 would require the Bureau of Land Management (BLM) to convey a reversionary interest in about 290 acres of land to the State of Oregon. The affected lands were conveyed to the state under the condition that interest in the lands would revert to BLM if the state stopped using the land for certain agricultural purposes. Under the bill, that condition would no longer apply.

Based on information provided by BLM, the Congressional Budget Office (CBO) estimates that implementing the legislation would have no significant effect on the federal budget. Because we expect that the affected lands would not generate any receipts for the federal government over the next 10 years, CBO estimates that enacting the legislation would not affect direct spending or revenues; therefore, pay-as-you-go procedures do not apply.

H.R. 3366 contains no intergovernmental or private-sector mandates as defined in the Unfunded Mandates Reform Act.

== Procedural history ==
The Hermiston Reversionary Interest Release Act was introduced into the United States House of Representatives on October 29, 2013, by Rep. Greg Walden (R, OR-2). The bill was referred to the United States House Committee on Natural Resources and the United States House Natural Resources Subcommittee on Public Lands and Environmental Regulation. It was reported (amended) by the committee on April 4, 2014, alongside House Report 113-402. The bill passed the House in a voice vote on May 28, 2014.

== Debate and discussion ==
At a hearing of the House Natural Resources Subcommittee on Public Lands and Environmental Regulation on February 26, 2014, Assistant Director Michael D. Need of the Bureau of Land Management (BLM) testified that BLM could not support the bill unless a variety of amendments were made to its text. The BLM wants the State of Oregon, who would receive the land, to pay for an appraisal of the land (to be conducted by the Department of the Interior's Office of Valuation Services) and then pay the market value of the land. BLM also wants a map of the land in question included in the bill so that there is no confusion.

Supporters say that the bill would allow the center to be moved and the land to be sold to the city to help it grow. According to Rep. Walden, who introduced the bill, the "center has fueled these innovations and helped growers in the region maximize use of precious water, fight off new pests and diseases, and achieve record-breaking yields. This common-sense legislation simply places the home of the research center back fully under (local) control." The research center is currently inside the city limits of Hermiston, which it wasn't at the tie it was built.

Hermiston Mayor David Drotzmann supported the bill, saying the "reversionary interest that the federal government maintains over the Hermiston experiment station deprives our community and OSU of the flexibility it needs to maximize the value of the property and the research done there. As our city continues to rapidly expand around the station, the reversionary interest stands in the way of future development."

== See also ==
- List of bills in the 113th United States Congress
