= William R. Ellis =

American politician

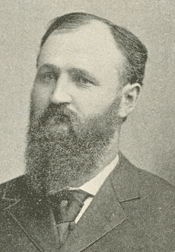

Member of the U.S. House of Representatives from Oregon's 2nd district
- In office March 4, 1893 – March 3, 1899
- Preceded by: None
- Succeeded by: Malcolm A. Moody
- In office March 4, 1907 – March 3, 1911
- Preceded by: John N. Williamson
- Succeeded by: Walter Lafferty

Personal details
- Born: April 23, 1850 Waveland, Indiana
- Died: January 18, 1915 (aged 64) Portland, Oregon
- Party: Republican

William Russell Ellis (April 23, 1850 – January 18, 1915) was an American educator, attorney and politician in the state of Oregon. A native of Indiana, he grew up in Iowa before moving to Oregon where he worked as a school superintendent and district attorney. A Republican, he served as U.S. congressman from Oregon in the new 2nd district from 1893 to 1899, and again from 1907 to 1911.

== Early life ==
Ellis was born in Waveland, Indiana, in 1850. In 1855, he moved with his family to Guthrie County, Iowa, where he attended the public schools, eventually graduating from Iowa State Agricultural College (later Iowa State University) and the University of Iowa College of Law in 1874. Ellis set up his law practice in Panora, Iowa, and was elected to one term as mayor of Panora. He moved his practice to Hamburg, Iowa, where he served as city attorney and then mayor.

== Oregon ==
In 1884, Ellis moved to Heppner, Oregon, where he became superintendent of schools for Morrow County, and then district attorney for the seventh judicial district of Oregon from 1886 to 1892. In 1892, Ellis was elected as U.S. Representative for Oregon's 2nd congressional district. He was the first representative for the district, which was created as a result of the 1890 census.

Ellis served on the Ways and Means Committee, and as chairman of the Committee on Expenditures in the Department of Justice and the Committee on Irrigation of Arid Lands. He served three terms, and sought a fourth in 1898, but the Republican nominating convention nominated Malcolm A. Moody instead. Shortly afterwards, Ellis was elected as circuit judge for Oregon's sixth judicial district, during which time he moved from Heppner to Pendleton.

== Second tour in Congress ==
In 1906, with incumbent congressman John N. Williamson mired in ongoing legal troubles due to the Oregon land fraud scandal, Ellis won the Republican nomination for his old Congressional seat, this time in a direct primary, one of the results of the "Oregon System" reforms of the early 20th century. He also won in the general election, and served two more terms before losing the 1910 Republican primary to Walter Lafferty. He returned to his law practice in Pendleton, eventually moving to Portland in 1914, where he died on January 18, 1915.

U.S. House of Representatives
Preceded by None (district created by 1890 census)	Member of the U.S. House of Representatives from Oregon's 2nd congressional district March 4, 1893 – March 3, 1899	Succeeded by Malcolm A. Moody
Preceded by John N. Williamson	Member of the U.S. House of Representatives from Oregon's 2nd congressional district March 4, 1907 – March 3, 1911	Succeeded by Walter Lafferty
