= Al Ullman =

American politician (1914–1986)

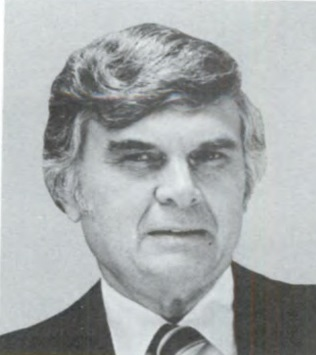

Chair of the House Ways and Means Committee
- In office December 10, 1974 – January 3, 1981
- Preceded by: Wilbur Mills
- Succeeded by: Dan Rostenkowski

Chair of the House Budget Committee
- In office July 12, 1974 – January 3, 1975
- Preceded by: Position established
- Succeeded by: Brock Adams

Co-Chair of the Joint Budget Control Committee
- In office October 27, 1972 – April 18, 1973 Serving with Jamie Whitten
- Preceded by: Position established
- Succeeded by: Position abolished

Member of the U.S. House of Representatives from Oregon's 2nd district
- In office January 3, 1957 – January 3, 1981
- Preceded by: Sam Coon
- Succeeded by: Denny Smith

Personal details
- Born: Albert Conrad Ullman; March 9, 1914 Great Falls, Montana, U.S.
- Died: October 11, 1986 (aged 72) Bethesda, Maryland, U.S.
- Party: Democratic
- Spouse: Audrey Ullman
- Education: Whitman College (BA); Columbia University (MA)

Albert Conrad Ullman (March 9, 1914 – October 11, 1986) was an American politician. A member of the Democratic Party, he represented Oregon's 2nd congressional district in the United States House of Representatives from 1957 to 1981. One of the most influential Oregonians ever to be elected to Congress, along with Senator Wayne Morse, Ullman presided over the powerful House Committee on Ways and Means during a period of time in which he was deeply involved in shaping national policy on issues relating to taxation, budget reform, federal entitlement programs, international trade, and energy.

== Background ==
Ullman was born in Great Falls, Montana, and raised initially at Gildford, Montana, after which the family moved to Cathcart, near Snohomish, Washington, where his father ran a small country grocery store. Two of his grandparents were German immigrants, and the other two had emigrated from Bohemia, then part of the Austro-Hungarian Empire. In 1935, he graduated from Whitman College in Walla Walla, Washington (where he played football as a running end) with a degree in political science. After teaching American history and government at Port Angeles High School in Washington for two years, Ullman earned a master's degree in public law from Columbia University in 1939.

Later, from 1942 to 1945, he served as a communications officer with the United States Navy in the South Pacific during World War II. After the war, Ullman settled in Baker, Oregon (now known as Baker City) where, having taught himself how to design and build houses, he worked as a builder and real estate developer in the early 1950s.

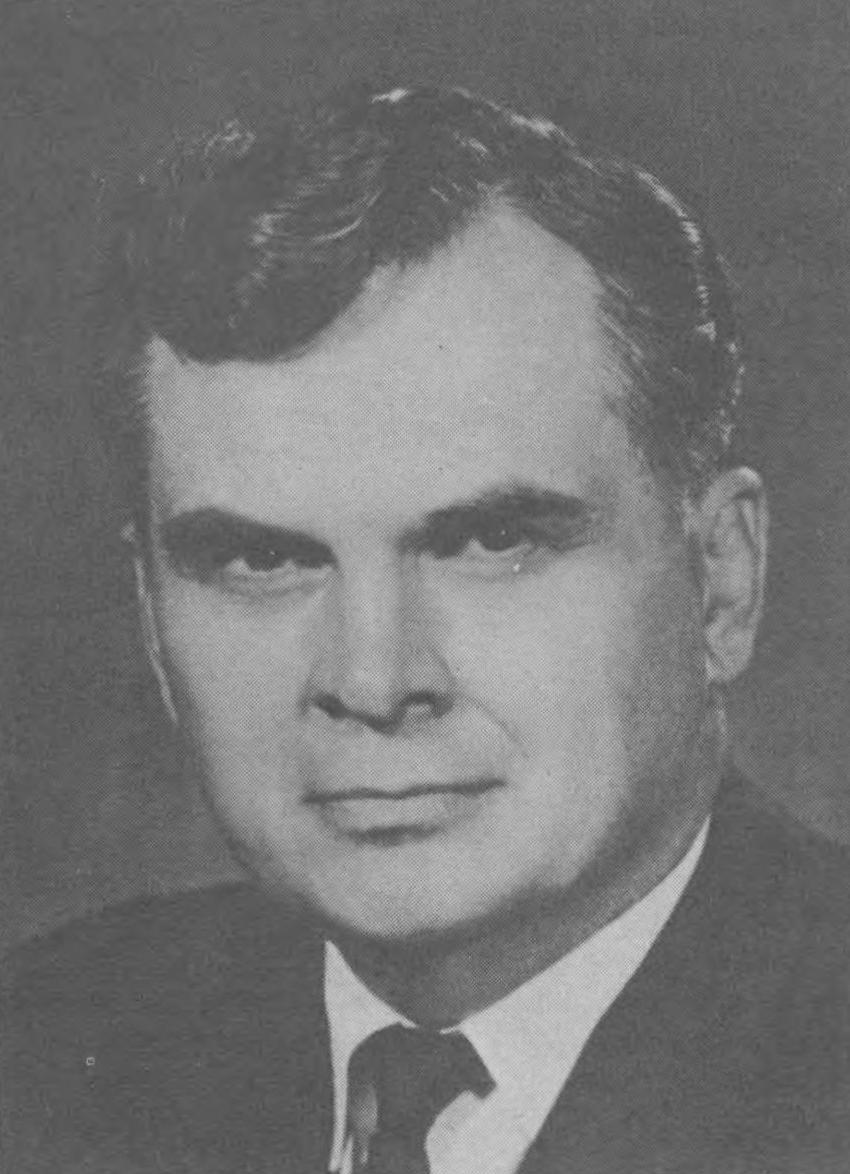
Al Ullman running for 2nd Congressional District Representative in 1968

== Political career ==
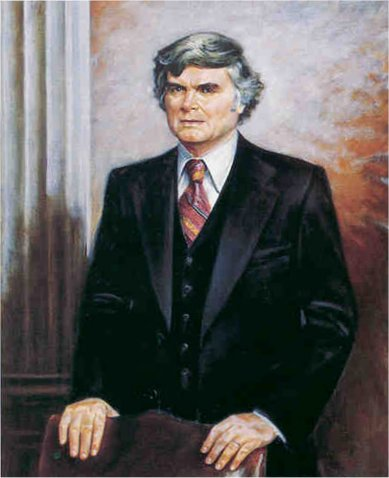
Portrait of Ullman as chair of the House Ways and Means Committee.

Ullman first ran for Congress in Oregon's 2nd congressional district in 1954. In a year that was generally good for Democrats – especially in Oregon – he lost to Republican Sam Coon, following the resurrection of a two-year-old charge of a violation of the Real Estate Code. Even the Republican-leaning Oregonian considered the allegations to be politically motivated. Ullman ran successfully for the seat in 1956, defeating Coon. Ullman won by waging a populist campaign focused on issues regarding public power, of which Ullman was a fierce proponent, and whether the hydroelectric development of Hells Canyon on the Snake River should be turned over to private interests, which Ullman opposed.

Ullman represented one of the largest districts in the nation that did not cover an entire state. His district stretched from the state capital of Salem all the way to the Idaho border. It encompassed roughly 70,000 square miles (180,000 km^{2}), an area larger than any state east of the Mississippi River – and included alpine forest, rangeland, and desert. While in Washington, he devoted himself to the development of Oregon's water resources and the improved management of public lands and national forests.

Committees Ullman served on:

- U.S. House Committee on Interior and Insular Affairs [now the House Committee on Natural Resources]
- U.S. House Committee on the Judiciary
- National Outdoor Recreation Resources Review Commission
- Joint Study Committee on Budget Control (co-chair, 1972–1974)
- U.S. House Committee on the Budget (chair, 1974)
- House Ways and Means Committee (chairman, 1975–1981; acting chairman, 1973–1975)
- Joint Committee on Taxation (co-chairman, 1975–1981)
- Democratic Committee on Committees

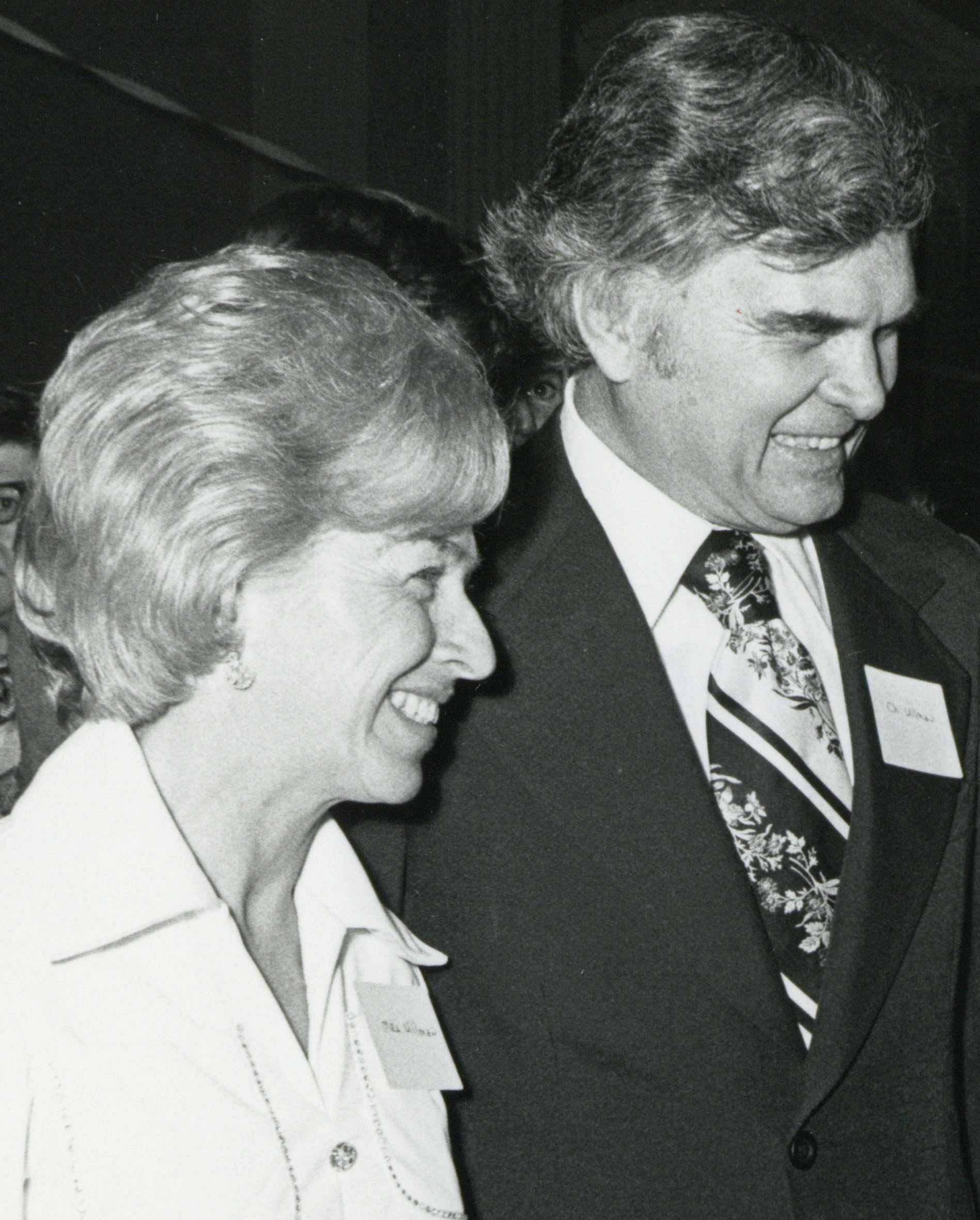
Al Ullman and his wife in May 1976

For most of his Congressional career, Ullman was viewed as a moderate Democrat. Among other things, Ullman is regarded by many as the father of the present-day United States budget process. In 1973, he initiated and later co-chaired the Joint Study Committee on Budget Control, leading to major budget reforms which, for the first time, required Congress to reconcile spending with revenues in order to address mounting federal deficits. He also served as chairman of the new House Budget Committee in 1974.

In 1975, Ullman ascended to the chairmanship of the House's powerful Ways and Means Committee, on which he had served since 1961 (and as acting chairman since 1973). As chairman, he oversaw the drafting and enactment of numerous major tax reform bills. For example, as The New York Times noted, "Among Mr. Ullman's most important actions as committee chairman was his sponsorship of sweeping legislation to cut taxes in an effort to help shore up the United States economy. His bill, which gave more than $20 billion in income tax rebates to Americans in the spring of 1975, brought the Oregon Democrat national recognition after almost two decades of relatively quiet Congressional service." Ullman also played a central role with respect to other key legislation, including the Windfall Profits Tax Act of 1980 (P.L. 96-223), which redirected an estimated $79 billion (according to the Congressional Research Service) of oil companies' profits resulting from price deregulation toward support for mass transit, oil price relief for poor families, and the development of alternative energy sources.

On many regional issues, Ullman was a de facto leader of the Pacific Northwest's Congressional delegation, along with Senator Henry "Scoop" Jackson (D-Wash.) and congressman (later to be House Speaker) Tom Foley (D-Wash.). In addition, Ullman was well known for his longstanding advocacy on behalf of American Indian tribes in Eastern Oregon, which he felt had historically been treated unjustly by the federal government with respect to treaty, land and other issues.

In the midst of the "Reagan landslide" – which also led to the defeat of President Jimmy Carter and the Republican takeover of the United States Senate – Ullman narrowly lost his bid for a thirteenth term from the Second District to Republican challenger Denny Smith. Ullman's electoral defeat was widely attributed to the nationally prevalent anti-incumbent and anti-government mindset; the presence in his House race of an independent candidate; the increasing conservatism of the Second District; to his advocacy for a value-added tax similar to that now used in the European Union and other nations as a partial alternative to what he viewed as inequities in the existing Federal income tax system; and to the decision of President Jimmy Carter to concede defeat in the 1980 presidential election before the polls in Oregon were closed, an act which Ullman and others believed discouraged many people from voting.

== After politics ==
After leaving office in 1981, Ullman remained in Washington, D.C., and established Ullman Consultants, Inc., a consulting firm in Georgetown, with his wife Audrey and former members of his Capitol Hill staff. In 1981, Ullman gave his extensive Congressional papers to the University of Oregon.

=== Death ===
He lived in Arlington, Virginia, and Falls Church, Virginia, until his death due to prostate cancer on October 11, 1986.

U.S. House of Representatives
Preceded by Sam Coon	Member of the U.S. House of Representatives from Oregon's 2nd congressional district 1957–1981	Succeeded by Denny Smith
New office	Co-Chair of the Joint Budget Control Committee; 1972–1973; Served alongside: Jamie Whitten	Position abolished
New office	Chair of the House Budget Committee; 1974–1975	Succeeded by Brock Adams
Preceded by Wilbur Mills	Chair of the House Ways and Means Committee; 1974–1981	Succeeded by Dan Rostenkowski
