= Malcolm A. Moody =

American politician

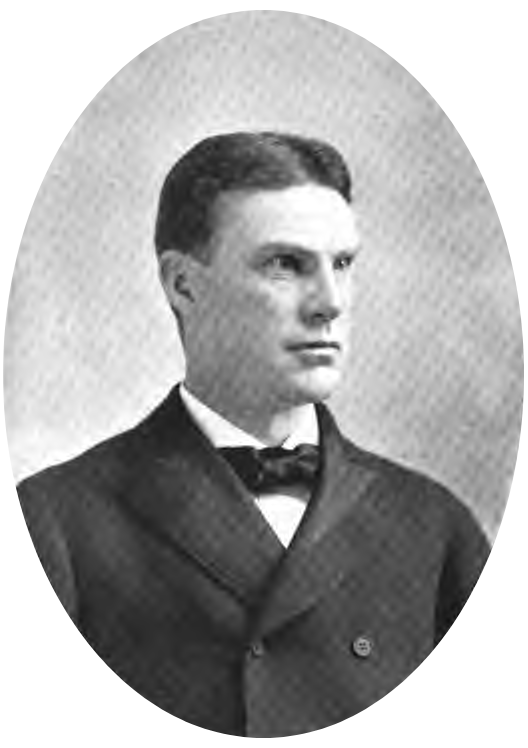

Member of the U.S. House of Representatives from Oregon's 2nd district
- In office March 4, 1899 – March 3, 1903
- Preceded by: William R. Ellis
- Succeeded by: John N. Williamson

Personal details
- Born: Malcolm Adelbert Moody; November 30, 1854 Brownsville, Oregon Territory
- Died: March 19, 1925 (aged 70) Portland, Oregon
- Resting place: Odd Fellows Cemetery in The Dalles
- Party: Republican

Malcolm Adelbert Moody (November 30, 1854 – March 19, 1925) was an American businessman and politician who served two terms as a Republican U.S. congressman from Oregon from 1899 to 1903.

== Early life ==
Moody was born near Brownsville in the Oregon Territory in 1854, the eldest child of future Oregon governor Zenas Ferry Moody and his wife, Mary Stevenson Moody. The Moody family moved to Illinois the following year, and then back to Oregon in 1862, settling in The Dalles. Malcolm Moody attended the public schools and then the University of California, Berkeley. He joined his father's mercantile business and worked at The Dalles National Bank.

== Political career ==
Moody was elected to The Dalles city council in 1885, and mayor in 1889, serving two terms. In 1899, he was elected as United States Representative for Oregon's 2nd congressional district. He was handily re-elected to a second term, defeating William Smith, but lost the nomination in 1902 to John N. Williamson due to internal party struggles. He resumed his mercantile business and did not return to public service.

== Personal life ==
Moody never married. According to The Dalles lore, he loved two sisters, Anne and Bessie Lang, but he could not choose between them and his love was unrequited. At his death, he willed his house—the oldest home in The Dalles, now known as the Rorick House Museum—to the Lang sisters.

=== Death and burial ===
He died in Portland in 1925 after a long illness and is buried in Odd Fellows Cemetery in The Dalles.

U.S. House of Representatives
| Preceded by William R. Ellis | Member of the U.S. House of Representatives from Oregon's 2nd congressional district March 4, 1899 – March 3, 1903 | Succeeded by John N. Williamson |
