= Sam Coon =

American politician (1903–1980)

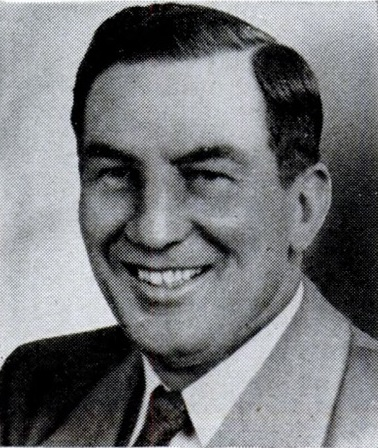

Member of the U.S. House of Representatives from Oregon's 2nd district
- In office January 3, 1953 – January 3, 1957
- Preceded by: Lowell Stockman
- Succeeded by: Al Ullman

Member of the Oregon Senate
- In office 1951–1953
- Constituency: Baker County, Oregon

Personal details
- Born: April 15, 1903 Boise, Idaho, U.S.
- Died: May 8, 1980 (aged 77) Laguna Hills, California, U.S.
- Party: Republican
- Spouse: Opal Kerfort
- Occupation: rancher

Samuel Harrison Coon (April 15, 1903 – May 8, 1980) was a Republican member of the U.S. House of Representatives who represented the 2nd Congressional District of Oregon from 1953 to 1957.

== Background ==
Born and raised in Boise, Idaho, Coon attended local public schools, and graduating from the University of Idaho at Moscow in 1925. He pursued various occupations in banking and agriculture, and was the owner-operator of a cattle ranch near Keating, Oregon, from 1929 to 1950. In 1937, Coon married Opal Kerfort. From 1951 to 1952 he engaged in the real estate business.

== Political career ==
In 1950, Coon was elected to represent Baker County in the Oregon State Senate, where the Republican served only during the 1951 session of the legislature. Toward the end of his term in the state Senate, Coon successfully ran for election to Congress as a Republican from Oregon's Second District. The two-term congressman was narrowly re-elected after a challenge from Democrat, Al Ullman, who ultimately defeated him in the election of 1956. Sam Coon served in the United States House of Representatives from January 3, 1953 to January 3, 1957.

== After politics ==
After serving as Deputy Director for the International Cooperation Administration in Lima, Peru, from 1957 to 1959, Coon took up residence in Laguna Hills, California. He died in 1980, and his ashes were distributed at sea.

U.S. House of Representatives
Preceded by Lowell Stockman	Member of the U.S. House of Representatives from Oregon's 2nd congressional district 1953–1957	Succeeded by Al Ullman
