= John N. Williamson =

American politician (1855–1943)

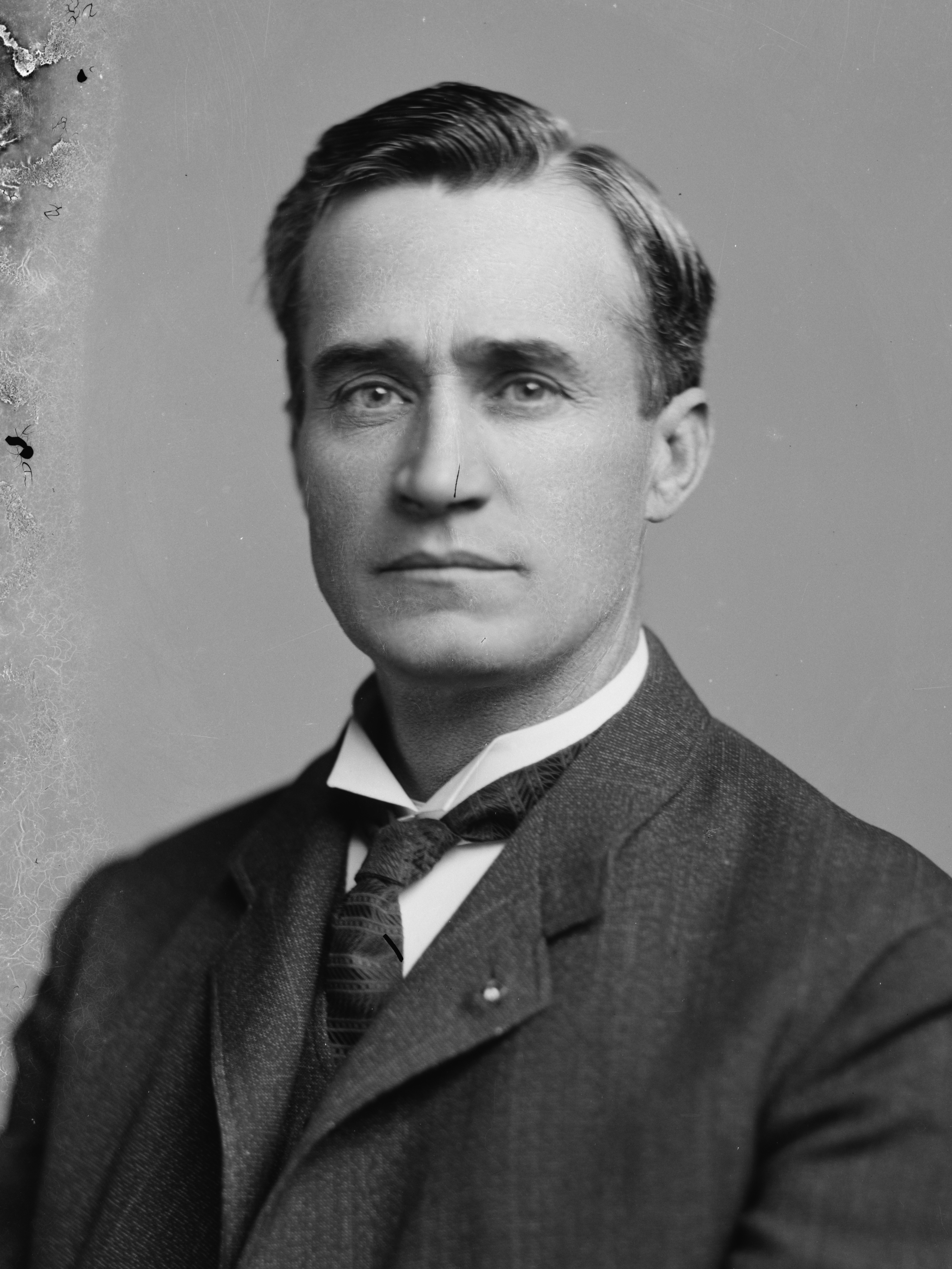
- Williamson c. 1901–1903

Member of the U.S. House of Representatives from Oregon's 2nd district
- In office March 4, 1903 – March 3, 1907
- Preceded by: Malcolm A. Moody
- Succeeded by: William R. Ellis

Member of the Oregon House of Representatives
- In office 1888; 1898

Member of the Oregon Senate
- In office 1901; 1903

Personal details
- Born: November 8, 1855 Junction City, Oregon Territory
- Died: August 29, 1943 (aged 87) Prineville, Oregon
- Party: Republican

John Newton Williamson (November 8, 1855 – August 29, 1943) was an American rancher and politician in the state of Oregon. A native Oregonian, he served in both chambers of the Oregon Legislative Assembly representing central and eastern Oregon in the late 19th century. A Republican, he then served in Congress from 1903 to 1907 and was involved in the Oregon land fraud scandal.

== Early life ==
John Williamson was born in Lane County, near Junction City in the Oregon Territory on November 8, 1855, to Joseph and Minerva Williamson. He earned his education at the local schools of Salem and then at Willamette University in that city. Williamson married Sarah V. Forrest in Albany and they had three children. In 1876, he moved to Eastern Oregon and started in the livestock trade in Wasco and Crook counties. He also owned and edited the Prineville Review in Crook county from 1893 to 1896.

== Political career ==
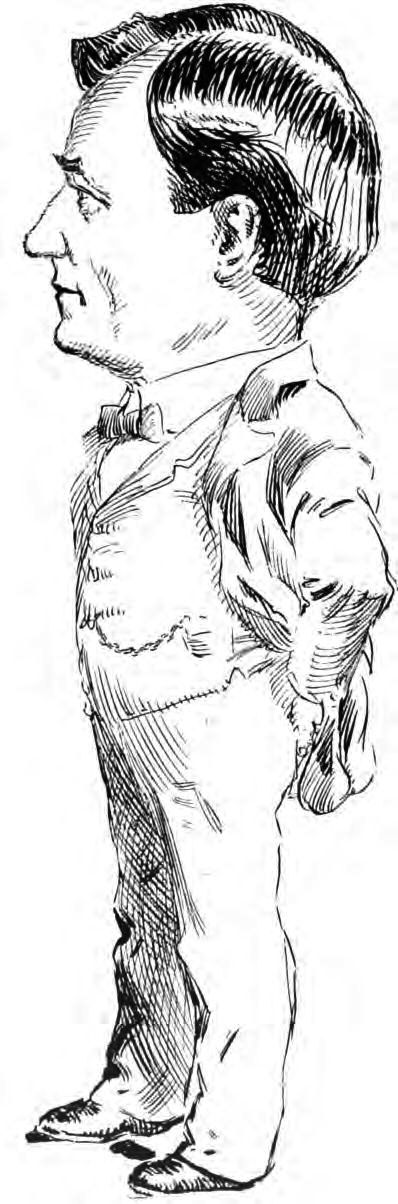
Caricature of Williamson from a publication about the scandal in which he was involved.

In 1886, he was selected as sheriff of Crook County, serving in that office until 1888. That year he was elected to serve the county in the Oregon House of Representatives. In 1898, he returned to the House as a Republican during a special session of the legislature and returned for the 1899 session. Williamson was elected to the Oregon State Senate in 1900 and served in the 1901 and 1903 sessions, but not the special session in 1903. Williamson represented Crook, Klamath, Lake and Wasco counties, and served as president pro tempore of the Senate in 1901.

He was elected as a Republican to the United States House of Representatives from Oregon and served from March 4, 1903, to March 3, 1907. He declined to run for re-election in 1906. In 1905, Williamson was convicted along with Oregon senator John H. Mitchell and other co-conspirators on crimes involving political corruption and the illegal acquisition of public lands in the Oregon land fraud scandal. His conviction was overturned in 1908 by the United States Supreme Court in Williamson v. United States, 207 U.S. 425, 28 S. Ct. 163. The court remanded the case for a new trial, but no new trial occurred.

== Later years ==
After leaving Congress he returned to Crook County and raising livestock and other agricultural activities. Williamson returned to public life in 1922, when he was appointed as the postmaster for Prineville, serving in the position until 1934. He died on August 29, 1943, at the age of 87 in Prineville, where he was buried at the Masonic Cemetery.

U.S. House of Representatives
Preceded by Malcolm Adelbert Moody	Member of the U.S. House of Representatives from Oregon's 2nd congressional district March 4, 1903–March 3, 1907	Succeeded by William R. Ellis
