= Prineville Reservoir =

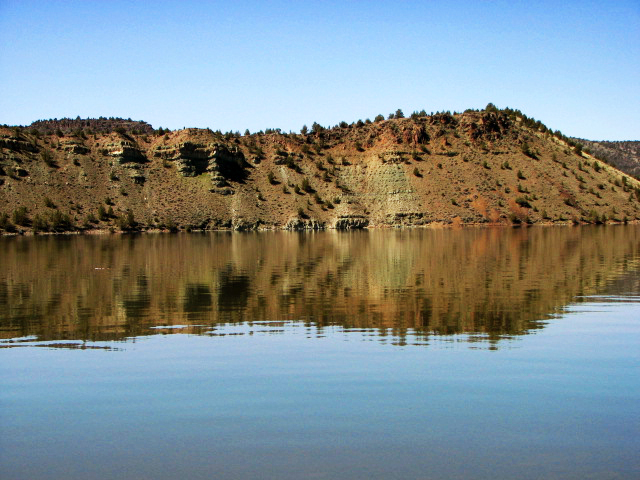

- Location within Oregon Location within the United States
- Location: Crook County, Oregon, United States
- Coordinates: 44°06′36″N 120°47′08″W
- Type: Reservoir
- Primary inflows: Crooked River, Bear Creek, Sanford Creek, Deer Creek, Alkali Creek, Antelope Creek, Owl Creek
- Primary outflows: Crooked River
- Catchment area: 2,635 sq mi (6,825 km^{2})
- Basin countries: United States
- Surface area: 3,030 acres (12 km^{2})
- Max. depth: 130 ft (39.6 m)
- Water volume: 150,200 acre⋅ft (185,300,000 m^{3})
- Shore length^{1}: 43 mi (69.2 km)
- Surface elevation: 3,257 ft (993 m)
- ^{1} Shore length is not a well-defined measure.

The Prineville Reservoir is in the high desert hills of Central Oregon, Oregon, United States. The reservoir is on the Crooked River 14 miles (22.5 km) southeast of Prineville, and 29 miles (46.7 km) east of Bend. This reservoir is a popular retreat for most of Central Oregon. It is near the geographic center of Oregon. Prineville Reservoir State Park is managed by the Oregon Parks and Recreation Department.

Prineville Reservoir was created by damming, via the Arthur R. Bowman Dam, the Crooked River upstream from Prineville. The reservoir is part of the U.S. Bureau of Reclamation's Crooked River Project, flooding a juniper- and sagebrush-filled canyon, and was finished in 1961. The dam and reservoir are owned by the Bureau of Reclamation, and operated under contract by Ochoco Irrigation District. Prineville Reservoir covers 18 miles (29 km) of the Crooked River and is primarily an irrigation storage water body, with secondary objectives of Crooked River flood control and public recreation. Prineville Reservoir has a maximum depth of 130 feet (40 m) and storage of just over 150,000 acre-feet (190,000,000 m^{3}) of water.

The northeast end of Prineville Reservoir is a designated wildlife management area; these 3,800 acres (15 km^{2}) of both land and water provide a refuge for wildlife.

== Fishing ==
Fishing can be quite good with rainbow trout, cutthroat trout, smallmouth bass, largemouth bass, catfish, crappie, and crayfish. The trout fishing experience is year-round, with ice fishing in winter.

== Boating ==
There is no speed limit on the lake and so boating of all kinds is very popular. Water skiing, wakeboarding and tubing are some of the most common sports and about half of the boats on the lake are there for this purpose. There is a marina with a boat ramp.

== Camping ==
There are two state parks that allow camping, Prineville Reservoir State Park, and Jasper State Recreation Site. Both have facilities and offer RV hookups. There is also a privately owned resort that rents cabins, offers campsites (with hookups), maintains a boat ramp and marina, and also owns a general store and restaurant.

== Wildlife ==
Prineville Reservoir is a popular place to see waterfowl, shorebirds, and birds of prey in one setting. Spring and fall migrations bring common loon, while the visitors in the summer include blue-winged teal, cinnamon teal, spotted sandpiper, American avocet, and black-necked stilt. Also seen is the bald eagle, golden eagle, osprey, prairie falcon, and red-tailed hawk, black-throated gray warbler, pinyon jay, and ash-throated flycatcher. Willow shrubbery may hold orange-crowned warbler and gray catbird.

Non-avian wildlife in the area include bats, black bear, coyotes, red fox, gray fox, bobcat, lynx, mountain lion, mule deer, elk, black tailed deer, pronghorn, badger, striped skunk, spotted skunk, porcupine, rockchuck, rabbits, squirrels, chipmunks, raccoons, snakes, and other assorted small mammals, reptiles, and amphibians.

== Astronomy ==
In 2021, Prineville Reservoir State Park was announced as an IDA Dark Sky Place, the first in Oregon. The group that uses this state park for parties or activities is the Oregon Observatory, which hosts their annual star party at the day use area. For those who go only stay the night to go stargazing, the Oregon State Parks department asks that people printing out and complete the free Stargazing Permit to be put on the car dashboard.

== See also ==
- List of lakes in Oregon
