= 2002 United States House of Representatives elections in Oregon =

- November 5, 2002

All 5 Oregon seats to the United States House of Representatives
	Majority party	Minority party
Party	Democratic	Republican
Last election	4	1
Seats won	4	1
Seat change	Steady	Steady
Popular vote	676,920	528,997
Percentage	54.58%	42.65%

Democratic
40–50%
50–60%
60–70%
70–80%
Republican
60–70%
70–80%
80–90%

The 2002 United States House of Representatives elections in Oregon were held on November 5, 2002, to select Oregon's representatives to the United States House of Representatives. All five seats were up for election in 2002, as they are every two years. All five incumbents were re-elected, four of them by large margins; only the 5th district was somewhat competitive.

== Overview ==
United States House of Representatives elections in Oregon, 2002
Party	Votes	Percentage	Seats	+/–
Democratic	676,920	54.58%	4	—
Republican	528,997	42.65%	1	—
Libertarian	22,626	1.82%		—
Socialist (Oregon)	6,588	0.53%		—
Constitution (Oregon)	3,495	0.28%		—
write-ins	1,689	0.14%		—
Totals	1,240,315	100%	5	—

== District 1 ==
2002 Oregon's 1st congressional district election
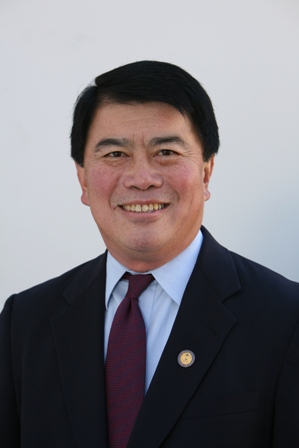

Nominee	David Wu	Jim Greenfield
Party	Democratic	Republican
Popular vote	149,215	80,917
Percentage	62.7%	34.0%
U.S. Representative before election
David Wu
Democratic
Elected U.S. Representative
David Wu
Democratic

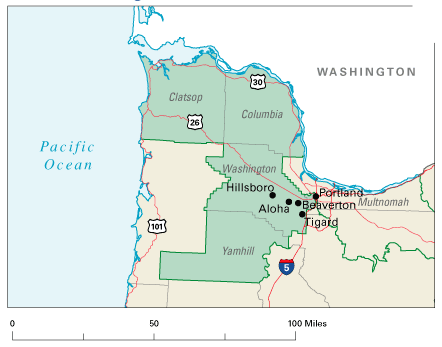

=== Predictions ===
Source	Ranking	As of
Sabato's Crystal Ball	Safe D	November 4, 2002
New York Times	Safe D	October 14, 2002

=== Results ===
Oregon's 1st congressional district election, 2002
Party	Candidate	Votes	%
Democratic	David Wu (incumbent)	149,215	62.69%
Republican	Jim Greenfield	80,917	33.99%
Libertarian	Beth A. Knight	7,639	3.21%
	write-ins	1,521	0.64%
Total votes		354,338	100%
Democratic hold			

== District 2 ==
2002 Oregon's 2nd congressional district election
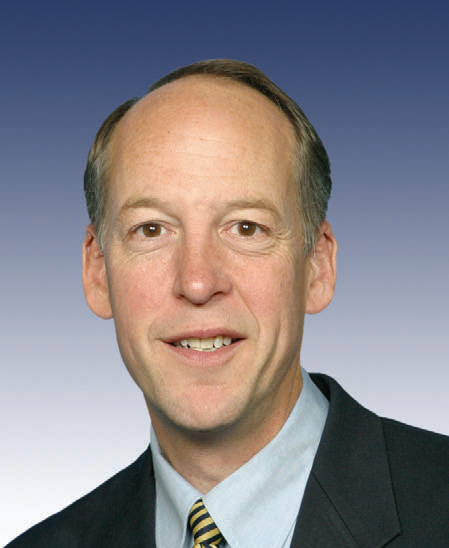

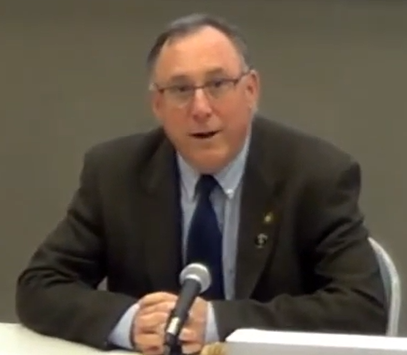
Nominee	Greg Walden	Peter Buckley
Party	Republican	Democratic
Popular vote	181,295	64,991
Percentage	71.9%	25.8%
U.S. Representative before election
Greg Walden
Republican
Elected U.S. Representative
Greg Walden
Republican

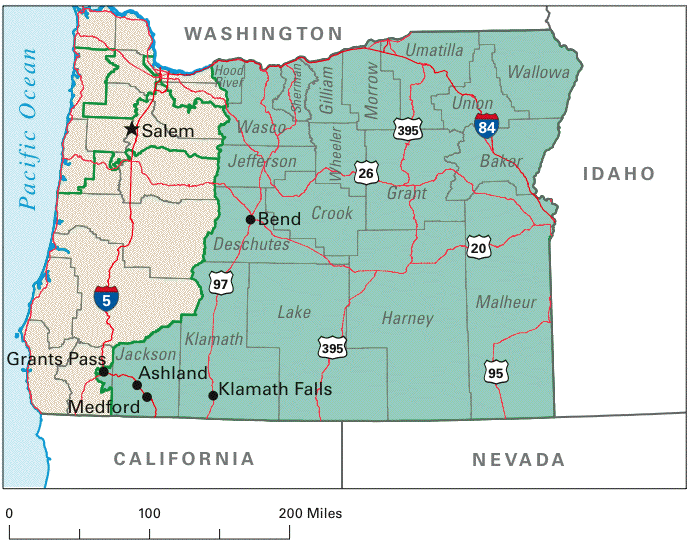

=== Predictions ===
Source	Ranking	As of
Sabato's Crystal Ball	Safe R	November 4, 2002
New York Times	Safe R	October 14, 2002

=== Results ===
Oregon's 2nd congressional district election, 2002
Party	Candidate	Votes	%
Republican	Greg Walden (incumbent)	181,295	71.86%
Democratic	Peter Buckley	64,991	25.76%
Libertarian	Mike Wood	5,681	2.25%
	write-ins	317	0.13%
Total votes		252,284	100%
Republican hold			

== District 3 ==
2002 Oregon's 3rd congressional district election
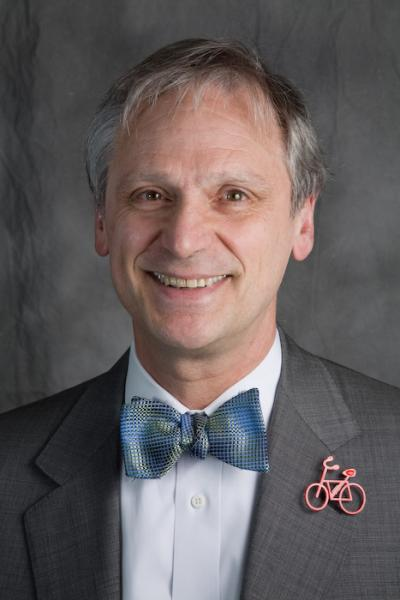

Nominee	Earl Blumenauer	Sarah Seale
Party	Democratic	Republican
Popular vote	156,851	62,821
Percentage	66.8%	26.7%
U.S. Representative before election
Earl Blumenauer
Democratic
Elected U.S. Representative
Earl Blumenauer
Democratic

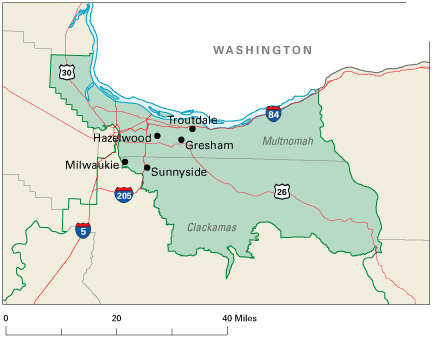

=== Predictions ===
Source	Ranking	As of
Sabato's Crystal Ball	Safe D	November 4, 2002
New York Times	Safe D	October 14, 2002

=== Results ===
Oregon's 3rd congressional district election, 2002
Party	Candidate	Votes	%
Democratic	Earl Blumenauer (incumbent)	156,851	66.75%
Republican	Sarah Seale	62,821	26.73%
Socialist	Walter F. "Walt" Brown	6,588	2.80%
Libertarian	Kevin Jones	4,704	2.00%
Constitution	David Brownlow	3,495	1.49%
	write-ins	518	0.22%
Total votes		234,977	100%
Democratic hold			

== District 4 ==
2002 Oregon's 4th congressional district election
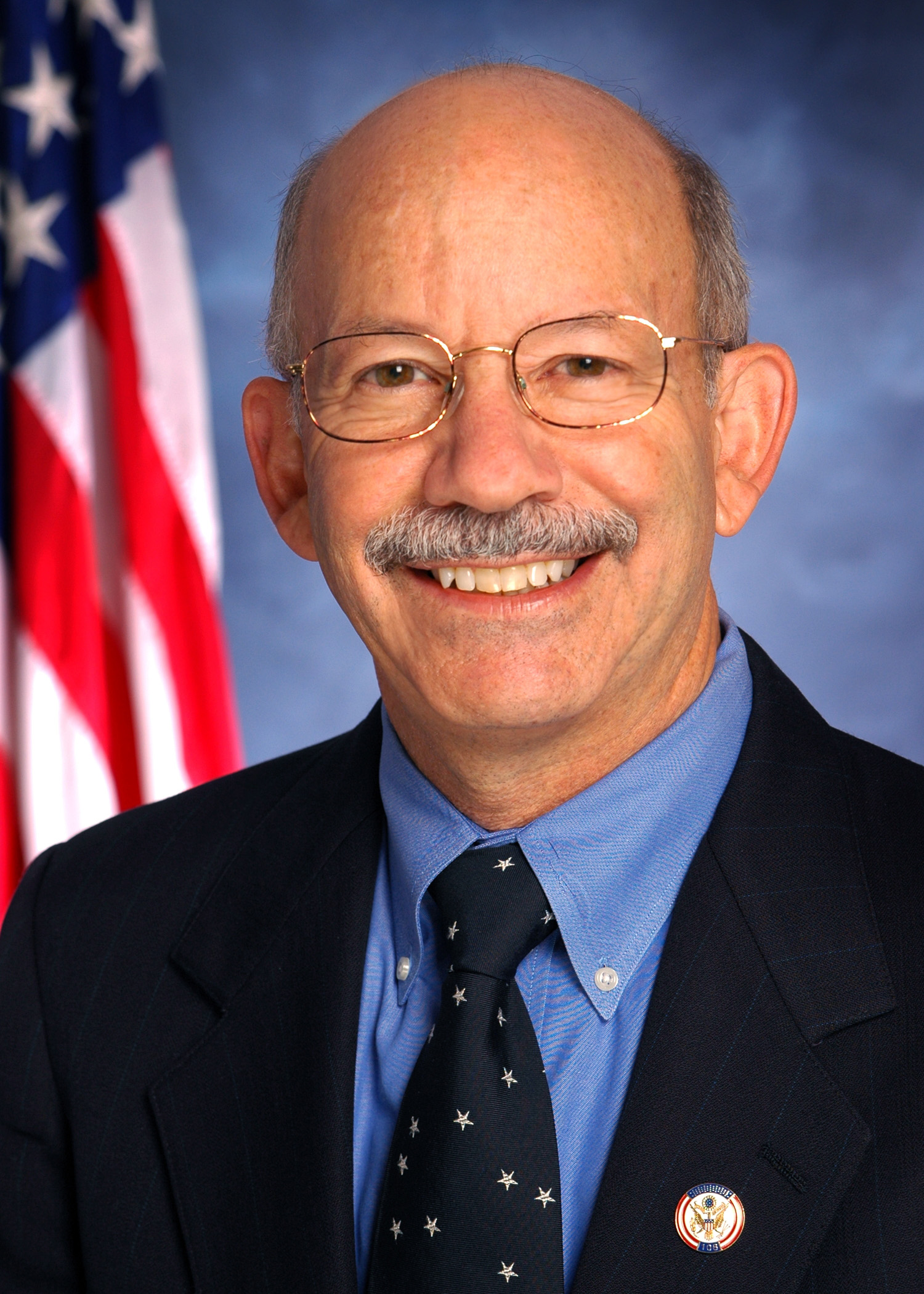

Nominee	Peter A. DeFazio	Liz VanLeeuwen
Party	Democratic	Republican
Popular vote	168,150	90,523
Percentage	63.8%	34.4%
U.S. Representative before election
Peter A. DeFazio
Democratic
Elected U.S. Representative
Peter A. DeFazio
Democratic

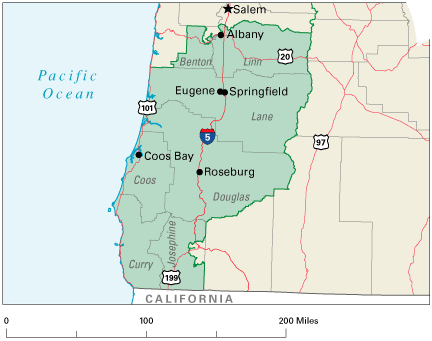

=== Predictions ===
Source	Ranking	As of
Sabato's Crystal Ball	Safe D	November 4, 2002
New York Times	Safe D	October 14, 2002

=== Results ===
Oregon's 4th congressional district election, 2002
Party	Candidate	Votes	%
Democratic	Peter A. DeFazio (incumbent)	168,150	63.82%
Republican	Liz VanLeeuwen	90,523	34.36%
Libertarian	Chris Bigelow	4,602	1.75%
	write-ins	206	0.08%
Total votes		263,481	100%
Democratic hold			

== District 5 ==
2002 Oregon's 5th congressional district election
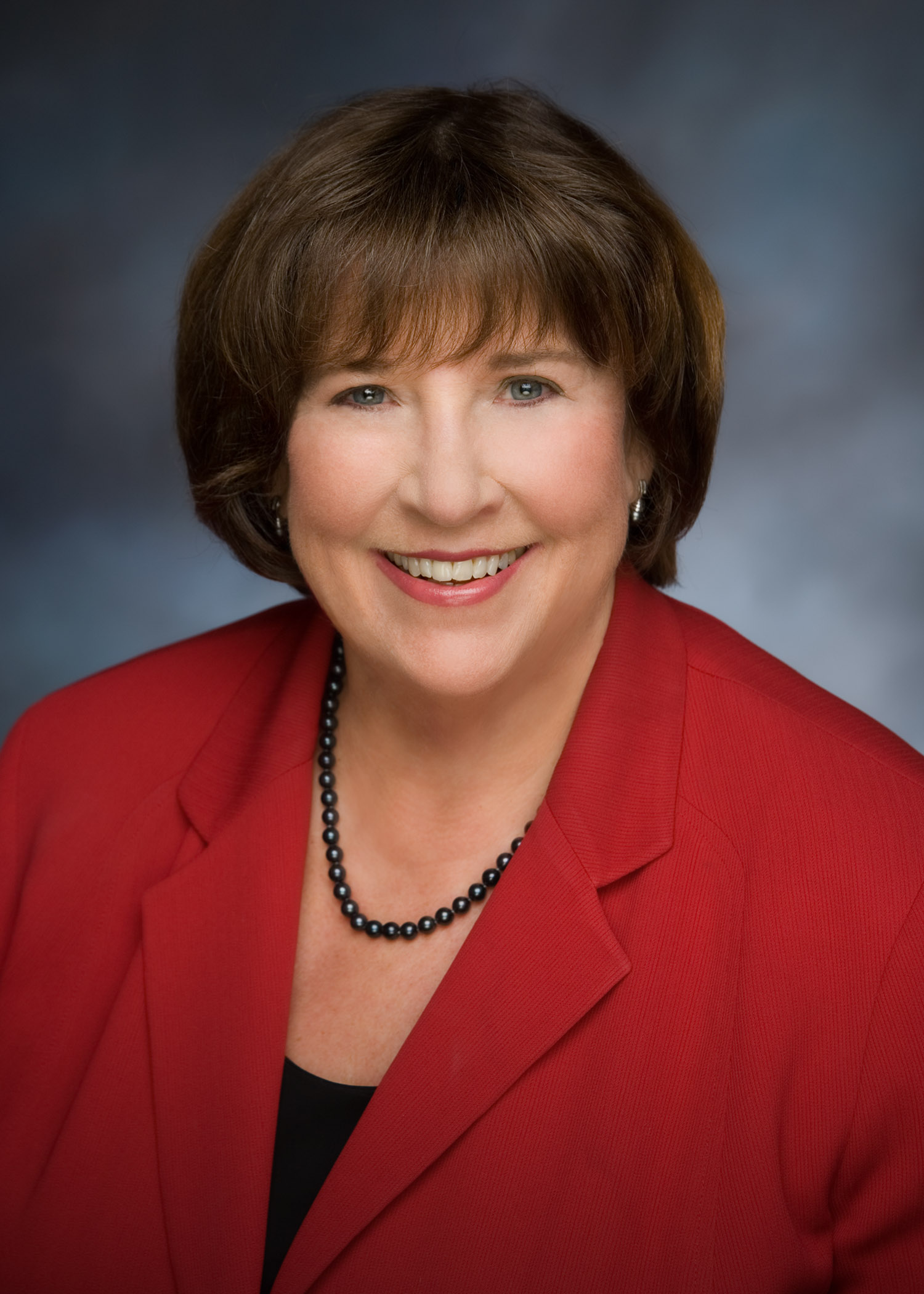

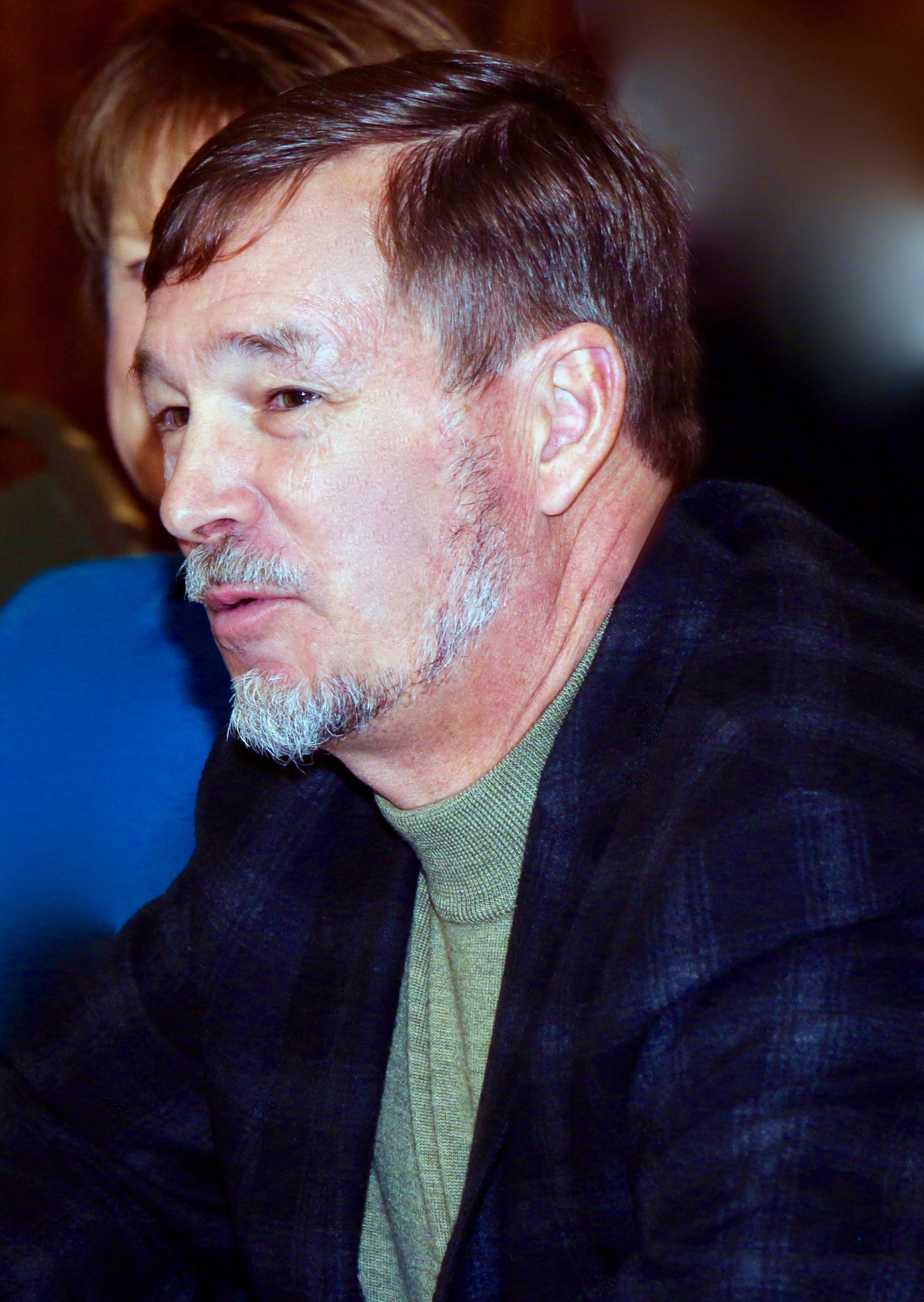
Nominee	Darlene Hooley	Brian Boquist
Party	Democratic	Republican
Popular vote	137,713	113,441
Percentage	54.8%	45.1%
U.S. Representative before election
Darlene Hooley
Democratic
Elected U.S. Representative
Darlene Hooley
Democratic

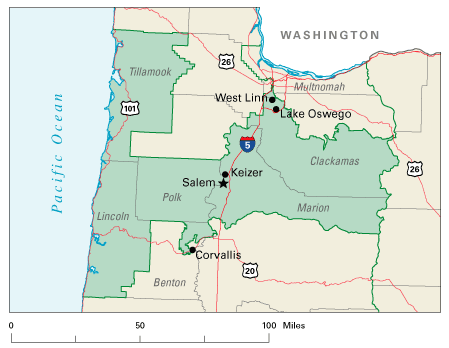

=== Predictions ===
Source	Ranking	As of
Sabato's Crystal Ball	Safe D	November 4, 2002
New York Times	Safe D	October 14, 2002

=== Results ===
Oregon's 5th congressional district election, 2002
Party	Candidate	Votes	%
Democratic	Darlene Hooley (incumbent)	137,713	54.75%
Republican	Brian Boquist	113,441	45.10%
	write-ins	383	0.15%
Total votes		251,537	100%
Democratic hold			

== See also ==
- United States House of Representatives elections, 2002
- United States Senate election in Oregon, 2002
- Oregon gubernatorial election, 2002
