= United States House Energy Subcommittee on Communications and Technology =

United States Congress subcommittee

Subcommittee of Committee on Energy and Commerce
- Active United States House of Representatives; 119th Congress

Leadership
- Chair: Richard Hudson (R)
- Ranking Member: Doris Matsui (D)

Structure
- Seats: 29 (29 currently filled) 16/16 13/13
- Political parties: Majority (16): Republican (16); Minority (13): Democratic (13)

Meeting place
- 2125, Rayburn House Office Building; Washington, D.C. 20515

Phone number
- (202)-225-3641

The U.S. House Energy Subcommittee on Communications and Technology is a subcommittee within the House Committee on Energy and Commerce. The subcommittee existed as the Subcommittee on Communications, Technology and the Internet during the 111th Congress and beyond.

== Jurisdiction ==
The committee has jurisdiction over:

- Interstate and foreign electronic communications, "both Interstate and foreign, including voice, video, audio and data, whether transmitted by wire or wirelessly, and whether transmitted by telecommunications, commercial or private mobile service, broadcast, cable, satellite, microwave, or other mode"
- Technology in general
- The emergency communication system and public safety communications
- "Cybersecurity, privacy, and data security"
- Oversight over:
  - Federal Communications Commission
  - National Telecommunications and Information Administration
  - Office of Emergency Communications in the Department of Homeland Security; and all aspects of the above-referenced jurisdiction related to the Department of Homeland Security.

== Members, 119th Congress ==
Majority	Minority
Richard Hudson, North Carolina, Chair; Rick Allen, Georgia, Vice Chair; Bob Latta, Ohio; Gus Bilirakis, Florida; Buddy Carter, Georgia; Neal Dunn, Florida; John Joyce, Pennsylvania; Russ Fulcher, Idaho; August Pfluger, Texas; Kat Cammack, Florida; Jay Obernolte, California; Erin Houchin, Indiana; Russell Fry, South Carolina; Tom Kean Jr., New Jersey; Craig Goldman, Texas; Julie Fedorchak, North Dakota	Doris Matsui, California, Ranking Member; Darren Soto, Florida; Yvette Clarke, New York; Raul Ruiz, California; Scott Peters, California; Debbie Dingell, Michigan; Nanette Barragán, California; Troy Carter, Louisiana; Rob Menendez, New Jersey; Greg Landsman, Ohio; Jennifer McClellan, Virginia; Kathy Castor, Florida
Ex officio
Brett Guthrie, Kentucky	Frank Pallone, New Jersey

== Historical membership rosters ==
=== 118th Congress ===
Majority	Minority
Bob Latta, Ohio, Chair; Buddy Carter, Georgia, Vice Chair; Neal Dunn, Florida; Gus Bilirakis, Florida; Tim Walberg, Michigan; John Curtis, Utah; John Joyce, Pennsylvania; Randy Weber, Texas; Rick Allen, Georgia; Troy Balderson, Ohio; Russ Fulcher, Idaho; August Pfluger, Texas; Diana Harshbarger, Tennessee; Kat Cammack, Florida; Jay Obernolte, California	Doris Matsui, California, Ranking Member; Yvette Clarke, New York; Marc Veasey, Texas; Darren Soto, Florida; Anna Eshoo, California; Tony Cárdenas, California; Angie Craig, Minnesota; Lizzie Fletcher, Texas; Debbie Dingell, Michigan; Ann Kuster, New Hampshire; Robin Kelly, Illinois
Ex officio
Cathy McMorris Rodgers, Washington	Frank Pallone, New Jersey

=== 117th Congress ===
Majority	Minority
Mike Doyle, Pennsylvania, Chair; Jerry McNerney, California; Yvette Clarke, New York; Marc Veasey, Texas; Donald McEachin, Virginia; Darren Soto, Florida; Tom O'Halleran, Arizona; Anna Eshoo, California; G. K. Butterfield, North Carolina; Doris Matsui, California, Vice Chair; Peter Welch, Vermont; Kurt Schrader, Oregon; Tony Cárdenas, California; Robin Kelly, Illinois; Angie Craig, Minnesota; Lizzie Fletcher, Texas	Bob Latta, Ohio, Ranking Member; Steve Scalise, Louisiana; Brett Guthrie, Kentucky; Adam Kinzinger, Illinois; Gus Bilirakis, Florida; Bill Johnson, Ohio; Richard Hudson, North Carolina; Markwayne Mullin, Oklahoma; Tim Walberg, Michigan; Buddy Carter, Georgia; Jeff Duncan, South Carolina; John Curtis, Utah
Ex officio
Frank Pallone, New Jersey	Cathy McMorris Rodgers, Washington

=== 116th Congress ===
Majority	Minority
Mike Doyle, Pennsylvania, Chair; Jerry McNerney, California; Yvette Clarke, New York; Dave Loebsack, Iowa; Marc Veasey, Texas; Donald McEachin, Virginia; Darren Soto, Florida; Tom O'Halleran, Arizona; Anna Eshoo, California; G. K. Butterfield, North Carolina; Doris Matsui, California; Peter Welch, Vermont; Ben Ray Luján, New Mexico; Kurt Schrader, Oregon; Tony Cárdenas, California; Debbie Dingell, Michigan	Bob Latta, Ohio, Ranking Member; John Shimkus, Illinois; Steve Scalise, Louisiana; Pete Olson, Texas; Adam Kinzinger, Illinois; Gus Bilirakis, Florida; Bill Johnson, Ohio; Billy Long, Missouri; Bill Flores, Texas; Susan Brooks, Indiana; Tim Walberg, Michigan; Greg Gianforte, Montana
Ex officio
Frank Pallone, New Jersey	Greg Walden, Oregon

=== 115th Congress ===
Majority	Minority
Marsha Blackburn, Tennessee, Chair; Leonard Lance, New Jersey, Vice Chair; John Shimkus, Illinois; Steve Scalise, Louisiana; Bob Latta, Ohio; Brett Guthrie, Kentucky; Pete Olson, Texas; Adam Kinzinger, Illinois; Gus Bilirakis, Florida; Bill Johnson, Ohio; Billy Long, Missouri; Bill Flores, Texas; Susan Brooks, Indiana; Chris Collins, New York; Kevin Cramer, North Dakota; Mimi Walters, California; Ryan Costello, Pennsylvania	Mike Doyle, Pennsylvania, Ranking Member; Peter Welch, Vermont; Yvette Clarke, New York; Dave Loebsack, Iowa; Raul Ruiz, California; Debbie Dingell, Michigan; Bobby Rush, Illinois; Anna Eshoo, California; Eliot Engel, New York; G. K. Butterfield, North Carolina; Doris Matsui, California; Jerry McNerney, California
Ex officio
Greg Walden, Oregon	Frank Pallone, New Jersey

== Subcommittee activities in 115th Congress ==
The subcommittee typically has two types of meetings:

- Hearings, in which subcommittee members discuss specific issues related to proposed legislation or general topics, listen to testimony from a panel of invited guests, and ask the panel questions
- Markups, in which the subcommittee considers specific bills, offers and votes on amendments, and then votes on whether to continue the bills through the legislative process

The following table shows some of the subcommittee's activities held in 2017, as of early March 2017.

Date	Type	Name	Purpose	Related legislation
4/5/17	Hearing	Facilitating the 21st Century Wireless Economy	Discuss a number of policy matters related to spectrum	S.19, To provide opportunities for broadband investment, and for other purposes.
3/29/17	Hearing	Realizing Nationwide Next-Generation 911	Examine the nation's 9-1-1 networks and discuss any weaknesses that may exist. Examine whether the national 9-1-1 system is “keeping pace with the next-generation innovations of voice, data, and video capabilities.”	None
3/21/17	Hearing	Broadband: Deploying America's 21st Century Infrastructure	"Discuss barriers at the federal level that hinder private sector investment in broadband infrastructure and to examine legislation intended to remove these barriers. Additionally, the Subcommittee will discuss the challenges of collecting, aggregating, and making available accurate data relating to the availability of broadband service across the United States."	Broadband Conduit Deployment Act of 2017
