= Arthur R. Bowman Dam =

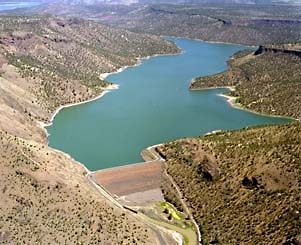
- Location: Crook County, Oregon, U.S.
- Coordinates: 44°6′44″N 120°47′12″W
- Opening date: 1961

Dam and spillways
- Impounds: Crooked River
- Height: 245 feet (75 m)
- Length: 800 feet (244 m)

Reservoir
- Creates: Prineville Reservoir
- Total capacity: 233,150 acre-feet (0.288 km^{3})
- Catchment area: 2,300 square miles (5,960 km^{2})
- Surface area: 3,580 acres (14.5 km^{2})

Arthur R. Bowman Dam (also known as Bowman Dam; National ID # OR00579) is an earth-type irrigation dam on the Crooked River in the U.S. state of Oregon. It is in Crook County. Its reservoir is called Prineville Reservoir.

The dam was constructed by the United States Bureau of Reclamation in 1961, and is operated by the Ochoco Irrigation District. The Crooked River wild and scenic area, which was designated by the Bureau of Land Management in 1988, passes through the center of Bowman Dam. Due to this designation, hydropower production is currently not allowed at the dam.

The dam is named for Arthur Ray Bowman, a Prineville businessman and civic leader.

In 2013, for the second time, the U.S. House of Representatives passed a Bowman Dam bill, which would authorize the city of Prineville to access about 6 percent more water from the reservoir. As of May 2013, the Bowman Dam bill has not passed the U.S. Senate.

== See also ==
- List of lakes in Oregon
