= 2020 United States House of Representatives elections in Oregon =

- November 3, 2020

All 5 Oregon seats to the United States House of Representatives
	Majority party	Minority party
Party	Democratic	Republican
Last election	4	1
Seats won	4	1
Seat change	Steady	Steady
Popular vote	1,285,339	966,786
Percentage	55.69%	41.89%
Swing	▼1.76%	▲3.87%

Democratic
50–60%
60–70%
70–80%
Republican
40–50%
50–60%
60–70%
70–80%
80–90%

The 2020 United States House of Representatives elections in Oregon was held on November 3, 2020, to elect the five U.S. representatives from the state of Oregon, one from each of the state's five congressional districts. The elections coincided with the 2020 U.S. presidential election, as well as other elections to the House of Representatives, elections to the United States Senate, and various state and local elections.

== Overview ==
The Democratic and Republican parties held their primaries on May 19, 2020. Oregon's other parties held their primaries at various dates until August 25, 2020.

United States House of Representatives elections in Oregon, 2020 Primary elections — May 19, 2020 - August 25, 2020
Party	Votes	Percentage	Candidates	Advancing to general	Seats contesting
Democratic	589,473	61.97%	19	5	5
Republican	361,733	38.02%	22	5	5
Libertarian	TBD		4	3	3
Green	TBD		2	2	2
Totals	951,206	100.00			—

=== District ===
District	Democratic		Republican		Others		Total		Result
District	Votes	%	Votes	%	Votes	%	Votes	%	Result
District 1	297,071	64.59%	161,928	35.21%	900	0.20%	459,899	100.00%	Democratic hold
District 2	168,881	36.92%	273,835	59.86%	14,717	3.22%	457,433	100.00%	Republican hold
District 3	343,574	73.02%	110,570	23.50%	16,362	3.48%	470,506	100.00%	Democratic hold
District 4	240,950	51.52%	216,081	46.20%	10,674	2.28%	467,705	100.00%	Democratic hold
District 5	234,863	51.89%	204,372	45.15%	13,411	2.96%	452,646	100.00%	Democratic hold
Total	1,285,339	55.69%	966,786	41.89%	56,064	2.43%	2,308,189	100.00%	

Popular vote
Democratic	55.69%
Republican	41.89%
Other	2.43%

House seats
Democratic	80.00%
Republican	20.00%

=== County ===
County	Democratic		Republican		Others		Margin		Total
County	#	%	#	%	#	%	#	%	Total
Baker	1,769	18.20%	7,687	79.07%	266	2.74%	-5,918	-60.87%	9,722
Benton	34,620	66.40%	16,208	31.09%	1,307	2.51%	18,412	35.32%	52,135
Clackamas	130,094	52.41%	110,916	44.68%	7,210	2.90%	19,178	7.73%	248,220
Clatsop	13,544	58.09%	9,739	41.77%	34	0.15%	3,805	16.32%	23,317
Columbia	14,855	47.40%	16,403	52.34%	83	0.26%	-1,548	-4.94%	31,341
Coos	14,745	40.37%	20,933	57.32%	844	2.31%	-6,188	-16.94%	36,522
Crook	3,128	20.90%	11,448	76.49%	390	2.61%	-8,320	-55.59%	14,966
Curry	6,019	41.05%	8,313	56.70%	329	2.24%	-2,294	-15.65%	14,661
Deschutes	55,654	45.97%	61,790	51.04%	3,615	2.99%	-6,136	-5.07%	121,059
Douglas	20,951	32.89%	41,400	64.99%	1,348	2.12%	-20,449	-32.10%	63,699
Gilliam	246	21.32%	884	76.60%	24	2.08%	-638	-55.29%	1,154
Grant	709	15.68%	3,688	81.54%	126	2.79%	-2,979	-65.86%	4,523
Harney	636	14.40%	3,668	83.06%	112	2.54%	-3,032	-68.66%	4,416
Hood River	7,737	61.51%	4,445	35.34%	397	3.16%	3,292	26.17%	12,579
Jackson	52,584	42.91%	65,897	53.77%	4,070	3.32%	-13,313	-10.86%	122,551
Jefferson	3,724	32.21%	7,428	64.25%	409	3.54%	-3,704	-32.04%	11,561
Josephine	16,621	33.37%	31,462	63.16%	1,729	3.47%	-14,841	-29.79%	49,812
Klamath	8,861	24.84%	25,564	71.66%	1,249	3.50%	-16,703	-46.82%	35,674
Lake	619	14.54%	3,539	83.13%	99	2.33%	-2,920	-68.59%	4,257
Lane	135,125	61.48%	79,857	36.33%	4,808	2.19%	55,268	25.15%	219,790
Lincoln	16,916	56.49%	12,109	40.44%	918	3.07%	4,807	16.05%	29,943
Linn	26,766	37.70%	42,492	59.85%	1,741	2.45%	-15,726	-22.15%	70,999
Malheur	2,466	21.08%	8,910	76.17%	321	2.74%	-6,444	-55.09%	11,697
Marion	77,014	47.93%	78,699	48.98%	4,960	3.09%	-1,685	-1.05%	160,673
Morrow	1,171	23.48%	3,628	72.75%	188	3.77%	-2,457	-49.27%	4,987
Multnomah	354,296	78.44%	82,708	18.31%	14,689	3.25%	271,588	60.13%	451,693
Polk	21,968	46.51%	23,877	50.55%	1,391	2.94%	-1,909	-4.04%	47,236
Sherman	188	16.17%	950	81.69%	25	2.15%	-762	-65.52%	1,163
Tillamook	7,972	48.34%	8,106	49.15%	415	2.52%	-134	-0.81%	16,493
Umatilla	8,887	27.96%	21,668	68.17%	1,231	3.87%	-12,781	-40.21%	31,786
Union	3,537	24.52%	10,499	72.78%	389	2.70%	-6,962	-48.26%	14,425
Wallowa	1,336	26.51%	3,576	70.95%	128	2.54%	-2,240	-44.44%	5,040
Wasco	5,663	41.74%	7,426	54.74%	478	3.52%	-1,763	-12.99%	13,567
Washington	207,070	66.98%	101,458	32.82%	626	0.20%	105,612	34.16%	309,154
Wheeler	173	18.60%	738	79.35%	19	2.04%	-565	-60.75%	930
Yamhill	27,675	49.03%	28,673	50.80%	96	0.17%	-998	-1.77%	56,444
Totals	1,285,339	55.69%	966,786	41.89%	56,064	2.43%	318,553	13.80%	2,308,189

=== Counties that flipped from Democratic to Republican ===
- Columbia (largest city: St. Helens)
- Deschutes (largest city: Bend)
- Marion (largest city: Salem)
- Polk (largest city: Salem)
- Tillamook (largest city: Tillamook)
- Yamhill (largest city: McMinnville)

== District 1 ==
2020 Oregon's 1st congressional district election
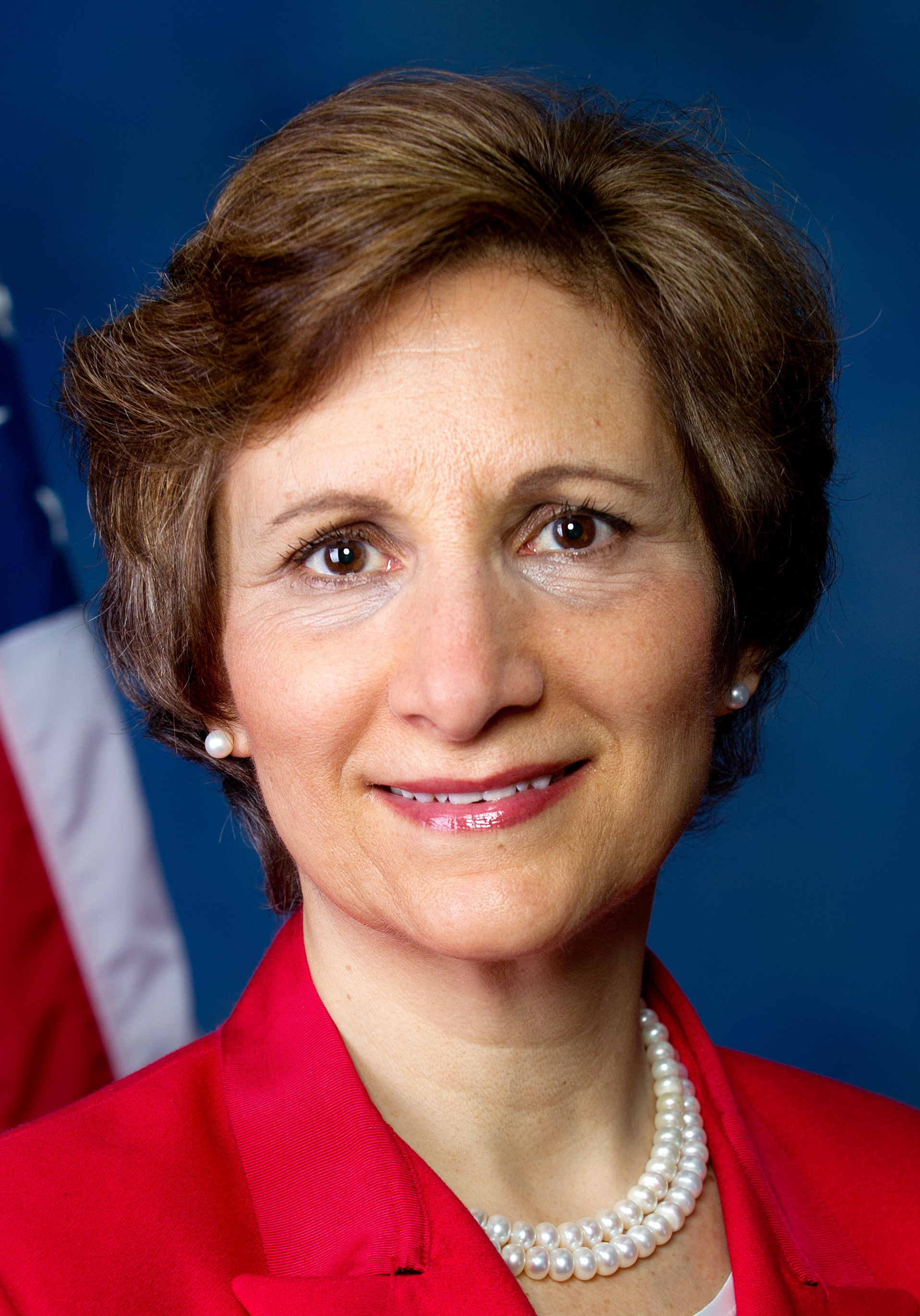

Nominee	Suzanne Bonamici	Christopher Christensen
Party	Democratic	Republican
Popular vote	297,071	161,928
Percentage	64.6%	35.2%
- Bonamici: 50–60% 60–70% 70–80% 80–90% >90% Christensen: 50–60% 60–70% 70–80% >90%
U.S. Representative before election
Suzanne Bonamici
Democratic
Elected U.S. Representative
Suzanne Bonamici
Democratic

The 1st district is located in northwestern Oregon and takes in the western Portland metro area, including the Portland suburbs of Beaverton and Hillsboro. The incumbent was Democrat Suzanne Bonamici, who was re-elected with 63.6% of the vote in 2018.

=== Democratic primary ===
==== Candidates ====
===== Declared =====
- Ricky Barajas, candidate for Oregon's 1st congressional district in 2018
- Suzanne Bonamici, incumbent U.S. representative
- Heidi Briones, insurance agent and universal basic income advocate
- Amanda Siebe, disability rights activist

==== Endorsements ====
Suzanne Bonamici

Unions

- Oregon AFL–CIO

Organizations

- J Street PAC
- League of Conservation Voters Action Fund
- Planned Parenthood Action Fund
- Planned Parenthood Advocates of Oregon
- Sierra Club

Newspapers

- Portland Mercury
- Willamette Week
Amanda Siebe

Parties

- Oregon Progressive Party

==== Primary results ====
Democratic primary results
Party	Candidate	Votes	%
Democratic	Suzanne Bonamici (incumbent)	100,733	83.6
Democratic	Heidi Briones	8,260	6.9
Democratic	Amanda Siebe	8,055	6.7
Democratic	Ricky Barajas	2,948	2.4
Democratic	Write-in	523	0.4
Total votes		120,519	100.0

=== Republican primary ===
==== Candidates ====
===== Declared =====
- Christopher Christensen, small business owner
- Armidia "Army" Murray, former UPS worker

===== Withdrawn =====
- Laura Curtis, small business owner (withdrew on March 9, 2020)

==== Primary results ====
Republican primary results
Party	Candidate	Votes	%
Republican	Christopher Christensen	27,417	55.8
Republican	Army (Armidia) Murray	20,509	41.8
Republican	Write-in	1,162	2.4
Total votes		49,088	100.0

=== General election ===
==== Predictions ====
Source	Ranking	As of
The Cook Political Report	Safe D	August 5, 2020
Inside Elections	Safe D	July 24, 2020
Sabato's Crystal Ball	Safe D	July 23, 2020
Politico	Safe D	July 6, 2020
Daily Kos	Safe D	June 3, 2020
RCP	Safe D	June 9, 2020
Niskanen	Safe D	June 7, 2020

==== Results ====
2020 Oregon's 1st congressional district election
Party	Candidate	Votes	%
Democratic	Suzanne Bonamici (incumbent)	297,071	64.6
Republican	Christopher Christensen	161,928	35.2
Write-in		900	0.2
Total votes		459,899	100.0
Democratic hold			

==== By county ====
County	Suzanne Bonamici Democratic		Christopher Christensen Republican		Write-in Various		Margin		Total
County	#	%	#	%	#	%	#	%	Total
Clatsop	13,544	58.09%	9,739	41.77%	34	0.15%	3,805	16.32%	23,317
Columbia	14,855	47.40%	16,403	52.34%	83	0.26%	-1,548	-4.94%	31,341
Multnomah (part)	33,927	85.58%	5,655	14.26%	61	0.15%	28,272	71.32%	39,643
Washington	207,070	66.98%	101,458	32.82%	626	0.20%	105,612	34.16%	309,154
Yamhill	27,675	49.03%	28,673	50.80%	96	0.17%	-998	-1.77%	56,444
Totals	297,071	64.59%	161,928	35.21%	900	0.20%	135,143	29.39%	459,899

== District 2 ==
2020 Oregon's 2nd congressional district election
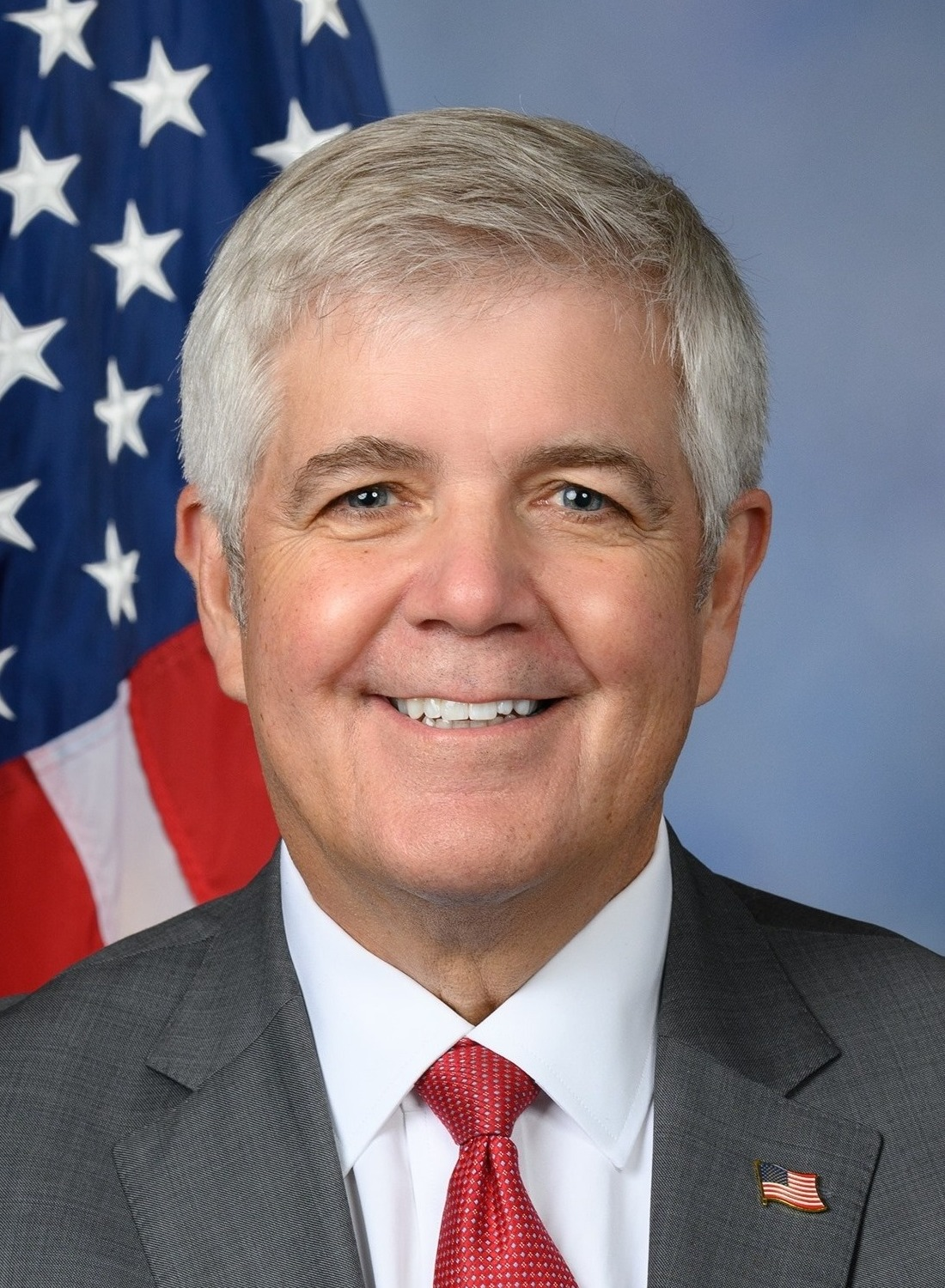

Nominee	Cliff Bentz	Alex Spenser
Party	Republican	Democratic
Popular vote	273,835	168,881
Percentage	59.9%	36.9%
- Bentz: 40–50% 50–60% 60–70% 70–80% 80–90% >90% Spenser: 40–50% 50–60% 60–70% 70–80% 80–90% Tie: 40–50% No votes
U.S. Representative before election
Greg Walden
Republican
Elected U.S. Representative
Cliff Bentz
Republican

The 2nd district, the geographically largest of Oregon's six districts, covers roughly two-thirds of the state east of the Cascades, encompassing the central, eastern, and southern regions of the state, including Bend and Medford. The incumbent was Republican Greg Walden, who was re-elected with 56.3% of the vote in 2018. On October 28, 2019, Walden announced that he would not seek re-election.

=== Republican primary ===
==== Candidates ====
===== Declared =====
- Jason Atkinson, former state legislator representing Oregon's 2nd Senate district and Oregon's 51st House district, candidate for Governor of Oregon in 2006
- Cliff Bentz, former state senator representing Oregon's 30th Senate district
- Knute Buehler, former state representative and nominee for Governor of Oregon in 2018
- David Campbell, project manager
- HG Carey Jr., railroad executive
- Jimmy Crumpacker, investor
- Travis Fager, radio business operator
- Justin Livingston, Bend city councilor
- Ken Medenbach, activist and participant in the 2016 Occupation of the Malheur National Wildlife Refuge
- Mark Roberts, online retailer and Independent candidate for Oregon's 2nd congressional district in 2018
- Jeff Smith, small business owner, candidate for governor in 2018

===== Declined =====
- Herman Baertschiger Jr., state senate minority leader
- Daniel Bonham, state representative
- Jason Conger, former state representative
- Tim Knopp, state senator
- Mike McLane, Jefferson & Crook County Circuit Court Judge; former state house Minority Leader
- Greg Walden, incumbent U.S. representative

==== Endorsements ====
Cliff Bentz

Newspapers

- East Oregonian

Results by county: Bentz: 30–40%; 40–50%; 50–60%; 60–70%; 70–80%; Buehler: 30–40%; Atkinson: 30–40%; 40–50%; Crumpacker: 30–40%

==== Primary results ====
Republican primary results
Party	Candidate	Votes	%
Republican	Cliff Bentz	37,488	31.3
Republican	Knute Buehler	26,405	22.1
Republican	Jason Atkinson	23,274	19.5
Republican	Jimmy Crumpacker	21,507	18.0
Republican	Travis A. Fager	4,265	3.6
Republican	Jeff Smith	2,539	2.1
Republican	Justin Livingston	1,350	1.1
Republican	Mark R. Roberts	1,336	1.1
Republican	Write-in	450	0.4
Republican	David R. Campbell	418	0.3
Republican	Glenn Carey	283	0.2
Republican	Kenneth W. Medenbach	267	0.2
Total votes		119,582	100.0

=== Democratic primary ===
==== Candidates ====
===== Declared =====
- Nik Heuertz, small business owner
- John Holm, caregiver
- Jack Howard, attorney and former Union County commissioner
- Alex Spenser, activist and writer
- Chris Vaughn, sales representative

==== Withdrawn ====
- Raz Mason, political activist and candidate for Oregon's 2nd congressional district in 2018 (withdrawal effective January 1, 2020, her campaign strategist Alex Spenser will continue her campaign)
- Isabella Tibbetts, community organizer (withdrawal effective March 12, 2020)

===== Declined =====
- Jamie McLeod-Skinner, environmental attorney and nominee for Oregon's 2nd congressional district in 2018 (running for Oregon Secretary of State)
- Jennifer Naehring, physician

==== Endorsements ====
Nik Heuertz

Organizations

- Oregon Progressive Party

==== Primary results ====
Democratic primary results
Party	Candidate	Votes	%
Democratic	Alex Spenser	23,482	32.1
Democratic	Nick (Nik) L. Heurtz	22,685	31.0
Democratic	Chris Vaughn	13,351	18.2
Democratic	Jack Howard	6,047	8.3
Democratic	John P. Holm	5,908	8.1
Democratic	Write-in	1,734	2.4
Total votes		73,207	100.0

=== General election ===
==== Endorsements ====
Cliff Bentz (R)

U.S. Representative

- Greg Walden, U.S. representative from OR-02 (1999-2021)

State legislators

- Knute Buehler, former state representative, Republican nominee for governor in 2018, and candidate for OR-02

Organizations

- NRA Political Victory Fund

==== Predictions ====
Source	Ranking	As of
The Cook Political Report	Safe R	July 2, 2020
Inside Elections	Safe R	June 2, 2020
Sabato's Crystal Ball	Safe R	July 2, 2020
Politico	Safe R	April 19, 2020
Daily Kos	Safe R	June 3, 2020
RCP	Safe R	June 9, 2020
Niskanen	Safe R	June 7, 2020

==== Results ====
2020 Oregon's 2nd congressional district election
Party	Candidate	Votes	%
Republican	Cliff Bentz	273,835	59.9
Democratic	Alex Spenser	168,881	36.9
Libertarian	Robert Werch	14,094	3.1
Write-in		623	0.1
Total votes		457,433	100.0
Republican hold			

==== By county ====
County	Cliff Bentz Republican		Alex Spenser Democratic		Various candidates Other parties		Margin		Total
County	#	%	#	%	#	%	#	%	Total
Baker	7,687	79.07%	1,769	18.20%	266	2.74%	5,918	60.87%	9,722
Crook	11,448	76.49%	3,128	20.90%	390	2.61%	8,320	55.59%	14,966
Deschutes	61,790	51.04%	55,654	45.97%	3,615	2.99%	6,136	5.07%	121,059
Gilliam	884	76.60%	246	21.32%	24	2.08%	638	55.29%	1,154
Grant	3,688	81.54%	709	15.68%	126	2.79%	2,979	65.86%	4,523
Harney	3,668	83.06%	636	14.40%	112	2.54%	3,032	68.66%	4,416
Hood River	4,445	35.34%	7,737	61.51%	397	3.16%	-3,292	-26.17%	12,579
Jackson	65,897	53.77%	52,584	42.91%	4,070	3.32%	13,313	10.86%	122,551
Jefferson	7,428	64.25%	3,724	32.21%	409	3.54%	3,704	32.04%	11,561
Josephine (part)	20,402	65.02%	9,793	31.21%	1,181	3.76%	10,609	33.81%	31,376
Klamath	25,564	71.66%	8,861	24.84%	1,249	3.50%	16,703	46.82%	35,674
Lake	3,539	83.13%	619	14.54%	99	2.33%	2,920	68.59%	4,257
Malheur	8,910	76.17%	2,466	21.08%	321	2.74%	6,444	55.09%	11,697
Morrow	3,628	72.75%	1,171	23.48%	188	3.77%	2,457	49.27%	4,987
Sherman	950	81.69%	188	16.17%	25	2.15%	762	65.52%	1,163
Umatilla	21,668	68.17%	8,887	27.96%	1,231	3.87%	12,781	40.21%	31,786
Union	10,499	72.78%	3,537	24.52%	389	2.70%	6,962	48.26%	14,425
Wallowa	3,576	70.95%	1,336	26.51%	128	2.54%	2,240	44.44%	5,040
Wasco	7,426	54.74%	5,663	41.74%	478	3.52%	1,763	12.99%	13,567
Wheeler	738	79.35%	173	18.60%	19	2.04%	565	60.75%	930
Totals	273,835	59.86%	168,881	36.92%	14,717	3.22%	104,954	22.94%	457,433

== District 3 ==
2020 Oregon's 3rd congressional district election
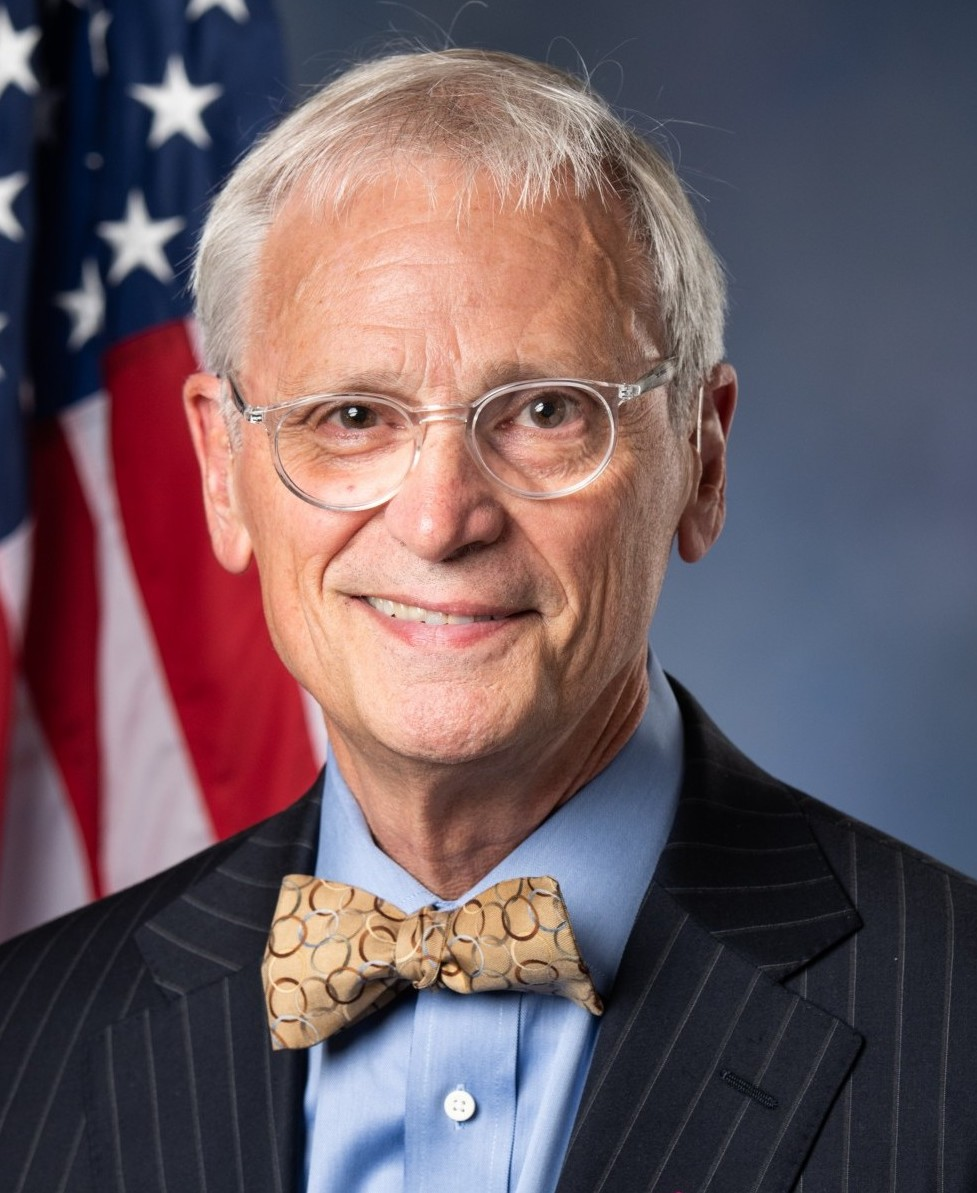

Nominee	Earl Blumenauer	Joanna Harbour
Party	Democratic	Republican
Popular vote	343,574	110,570
Percentage	73.0%	23.5%
- Blumenaur: 40–50% 50–60% 60–70% 70–80% 80–90% >90% Harbour: 40–50% 50–60% 60–70% No votes
U.S. Representative before election
Earl Blumenauer
Democratic
Elected U.S. Representative
Earl Blumenauer
Democratic

The 3rd district encompasses the eastern Portland metro area, taking in Portland and Gresham. The incumbent was Democrat Earl Blumenauer, who was re-elected with 72.6% of the vote in 2018. Running against him for the Republican Party was Joanna Harbour, while the Green Party candidate was author and civil rights activist Alex DiBlasi.

=== Democratic primary ===
==== Candidates ====
===== Declared =====
- Charles Rand Barnett, candidate for Oregon's 3rd congressional district in 2018
- Earl Blumenauer, incumbent U.S. representative
- Matthew Davis, businessman
- Albert Lee, civic activist and dean of the Business and Computing division at Portland Community College

==== Endorsements ====
Earl Blumenauer

Unions

- Oregon AFL–CIO

Organizations

- J Street PAC
- League of Conservation Voters Action Fund
- Planned Parenthood Action Fund
- Planned Parenthood Advocates of Oregon

Newspapers

- Willamette Week
Albert Lee

Unions

- American Federation of Teachers - Oregon

Organizations

- Brand New Congress
- Democratic Socialists of America - Portland chapter
- Forward Thinking Democracy
- Our Revolution

Parties

- Oregon Progressive Party

Publications

- Portland Mercury

==== Primary results ====
Democratic primary results
Party	Candidate	Votes	%
Democratic	Earl Blumenauer (incumbent)	140,812	80.5
Democratic	Albert Lee	29,311	16.8
Democratic	Dane Wilcox	1,966	1.1
Democratic	Matthew S. Davis	1,101	0.6
Democratic	Charles Rand Barnett	953	0.5
Democratic	Write-in	714	0.4
Total votes		174,857	100.0

=== Republican primary ===
==== Candidates ====
===== Declared =====
- Joanna Harbour, attorney
- Tom Harrison, nominee for Oregon's 3rd congressional district in 2018
- Frank Hecker, former US Naval officer

==== Primary results ====
Republican primary results
Party	Candidate	Votes	%
Republican	Joanna Harbour	21,114	62.8
Republican	Tom Harrison	7,751	23.1
Republican	Frank Hecker	4,147	12.3
Republican	Write-in	612	1.8
Total votes		33,624	100.0

=== General election ===
==== Predictions ====
Source	Ranking	As of
The Cook Political Report	Safe D	July 2, 2020
Inside Elections	Safe D	June 2, 2020
Sabato's Crystal Ball	Safe D	July 2, 2020
Politico	Safe D	April 19, 2020
Daily Kos	Safe D	June 3, 2020
RCP	Safe D	June 9, 2020
Niskanen	Safe D	June 7, 2020

==== Results ====
2020 Oregon's 3rd congressional district election
Party	Candidate	Votes	%
Democratic	Earl Blumenauer (incumbent)	343,574	73.0
Republican	Joanna Harbour	110,570	23.5
Pacific Green	Alex DiBlasi	8,872	1.9
Libertarian	Josh Solomon	6,869	1.5
Write-in		621	0.1
Total votes		470,506	100.0
Democratic hold			

==== By county ====
County	Earl Blumenauer Democratic		Joanna Harbour Republican		Various candidates Other parties		Margin		Total
County	#	%	#	%	#	%	#	%	Total
Clackamas (part)	26,683	42.16%	34,745	54.90%	1,861	2.94%	-8,062	-12.74%	63,289
Multnomah (part)	316,891	77.82%	75,825	18.62%	14,501	3.56%	241,066	59.20%	407,217
Totals	343,574	73.02%	110,570	23.50%	16,362	3.48%	233,004	49.52%	470,506

== District 4 ==
2020 Oregon's 4th congressional district election
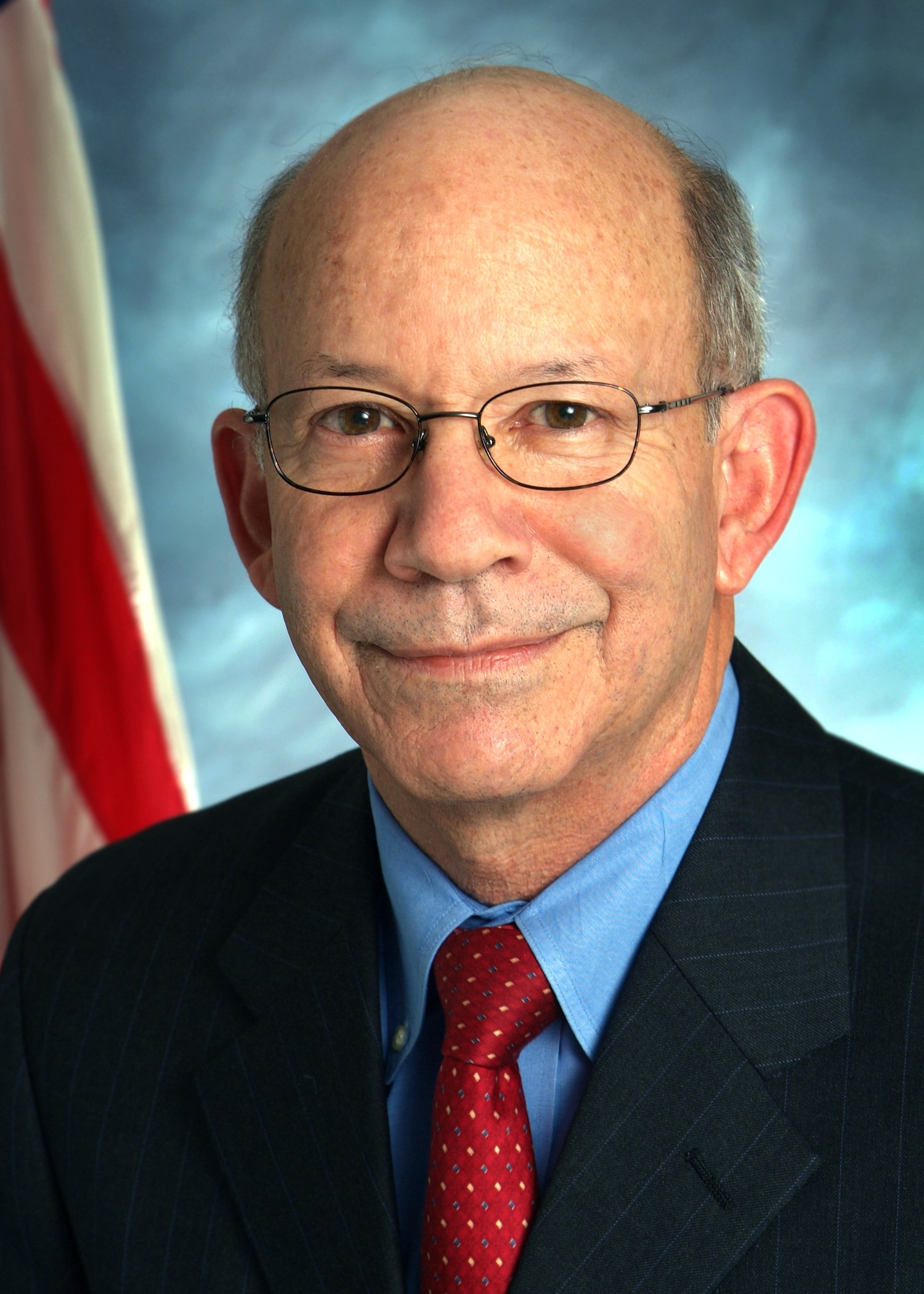

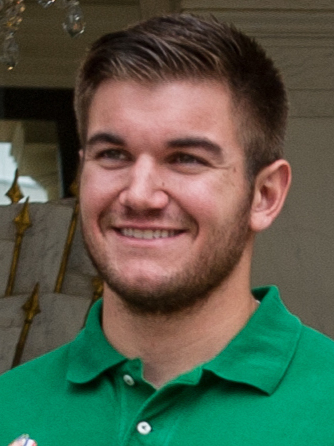
Nominee	Peter DeFazio	Alek Skarlatos
Party	Democratic	Republican
Popular vote	240,950	216,081
Percentage	51.5%	46.2%
- DeFazio: 40–50% 50–60% 60–70% 70–80% 80–90% Skarlatos: 40–50% 50–60% 60–70% 70–80% 80–90% No votes
U.S. Representative before election
Peter DeFazio
Democratic
Elected U.S. Representative
Peter DeFazio
Democratic

The 4th district takes in the southern Willamette Valley and the South Coast, including Eugene, Corvallis, and Roseburg. The incumbent was Democrat Peter DeFazio, who was re-elected with 56.0% of the vote in 2018.

=== Democratic primary ===
==== Candidates ====
===== Declared =====
- Doyle Canning, community organizer
- Peter DeFazio, incumbent U.S. representative

===== Withdrawn =====
- Cassidy A. Clausen, healthcare worker (withdrawal effective March 12, 2020)

==== Endorsements ====
Doyle Canning

Organizations

- Brand New Congress
- Climate Hawks Vote
- Friends of the Earth Action
Peter DeFazio

Organizations

- J Street PAC
- League of Conservation Voters Action Fund
- Planned Parenthood Action Fund
- Planned Parenthood Advocates of Oregon
- Sierra Club

==== Primary results ====
Democratic primary results
Party	Candidate	Votes	%
Democratic	Peter DeFazio (incumbent)	96,077	83.7
Democratic	Doyle Elizabeth Canning	17,701	15.4
Democratic	Write-in	974	0.9
Total votes		114,752	100.0

=== Republican primary ===
==== Candidates ====
===== Declared =====
- Nelson Ijih, engineer
- Alek Skarlatos, former Oregon National Guard soldier

===== Withdrawn =====
- Jo Rae Perkins, former chairwoman of the Linn County Republican Party and perennial candidate and supporter of the QAnon conspiracy theory. (nominee for U.S. Senate)
- Art Robinson, chemist, former chair of the Oregon Republican Party, global warming and evolution denialist and perennial candidate (running for State Senate)

==== Endorsements ====
Alek Skarlatos

U.S. senators

- Ted Cruz, Texas

U.S. representatives

- Dan Crenshaw, U.S. representative from Texas's 2nd congressional district

State legislators

- Dallas Heard, state senator from Oregon's 1st Senate district
- Tim Knopp, state senator from Oregon's 27th Senate district

Organizations

- National Right to Life Committee
- Oregon Right to Life PAC

==== Primary results ====
Republican primary results
Party	Candidate	Votes	%
Republican	Alek Skarlatos	70,599	86.4
Republican	Nelson Ijih	10,325	12.6
Republican	Write-in	780	1.0
Total votes		81,704	100.0

=== General election ===
==== Predictions ====
Source	Ranking	As of
The Cook Political Report	Lean D	October 2, 2020
Inside Elections	Likely D	October 1, 2020
Sabato's Crystal Ball	Lean D	October 15, 2020
RCP	Safe D	June 9, 2020
Niskanen	Safe D	June 7, 2020
Daily Kos	Safe D	June 3, 2020
Politico	Lean D	October 11, 2020

==== Results ====
2020 Oregon's 4th congressional district election
Party	Candidate	Votes	%
Democratic	Peter DeFazio (incumbent)	240,950	51.5
Republican	Alek Skarlatos	216,081	46.2
Pacific Green	Daniel Hoffay	10,118	2.2
Write-in		556	0.1
Total votes		467,705	100.0
Democratic hold			

==== By county ====
County	Peter DeFazio Democratic		Alek Skarlatos Republican		Various candidates Other parties		Margin		Total
County	#	%	#	%	#	%	#	%	Total
Benton (part)	30,516	69.99%	12,026	27.58%	1,056	2.42%	18,490	42.41%	43,598
Coos	14,745	40.37%	20,933	57.32%	844	2.31%	-6,188	-16.94%	36,522
Curry	6,019	41.05%	8,313	56.70%	329	2.24%	-2,294	-15.65%	14,661
Douglas	20,951	32.89%	41,400	64.99%	1,348	2.12%	-20,449	-32.10%	63,699
Josephine (part)	6,828	37.04%	11,060	59.99%	548	2.97%	-4,232	-22.96%	18,436
Lane	135,125	61.48%	79,857	36.33%	4,808	2.19%	55,268	25.15%	219,790
Linn	26,766	37.70%	42,492	59.85%	1,741	2.45%	-15,726	-22.15%	70,999
Totals	240,950	51.52%	216,081	46.20%	10,674	2.28%	24,869	5.32%	467,705

== District 5 ==
2020 Oregon's 5th congressional district election
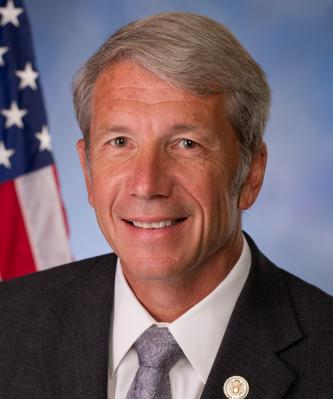

Nominee	Kurt Schrader	Amy Ryan Courser
Party	Democratic	Republican
Popular vote	234,863	204,372
Percentage	51.9%	45.2%
- Schrader: 40–50% 50–60% 60–70% 70–80% 80–90% Ryan Courser: 40–50% 50–60% 60–70% 70–80% 80–90% >90% Tie: 40–50% 50% No votes
U.S. Representative before election
Kurt Schrader
Democratic
Elected U.S. Representative
Kurt Schrader
Democratic

The 5th district straddles the central coast, and includes Salem and the southern Portland suburbs. The incumbent was Democrat Kurt Schrader, who was re-elected with 55.0% of the vote in 2018.

=== Democratic primary ===
==== Candidates ====
===== Declared =====
- Mark Gamba, mayor of Milwaukie
- Blair Reynolds, entrepreneur
- Kurt Schrader, incumbent U.S. representative

==== Endorsements ====
Mark Gamba

Organizations

- Brand New Congress

Parties

- Oregon Progressive Party

Newspapers

- Portland Mercury
Kurt Schrader

Organizations

- Planned Parenthood Action Fund
- Planned Parenthood Advocates of Oregon

Newspapers

- Willamette Week

==== Primary results ====
Democratic primary results
Party	Candidate	Votes	%
Democratic	Kurt Schrader (incumbent)	73,060	68.8
Democratic	Mark Gamba	24,327	22.9
Democratic	Blair G. Reynolds	7,910	7.5
Democratic	Write-in	841	0.8
Total votes		106,138	100.0

=== Republican primary ===
==== Candidates ====
===== Declared =====
- Shane Dinkel, computer trainer
- Joey Nations, tax policy analyst
- Angela Roman, businesswoman
- Amy Ryan Courser, former Keizer city councilor, businesswoman, and community volunteer

==== Endorsements ====
Shane Dinkel

Newspapers

- Willamette Week

==== Primary results ====
Republican primary results
Party	Candidate	Votes	%
Republican	Amy Ryan Courser	41,417	53.3
Republican	G. Shane Dinkel	15,626	20.1
Republican	Joey Nations	13,534	17.4
Republican	Angela Roman	6,155	7.9
Republican	Write-in	1,003	1.3
Total votes		77,735	100.0

=== General election ===
==== Predictions ====
Source	Ranking	As of
The Cook Political Report	Safe D	July 2, 2020
Sabato's Crystal Ball	Safe D	July 2, 2020
RCP	Safe D	June 9, 2020
Niskanen	Safe D	June 7, 2020
Daily Kos	Safe D	June 3, 2020
Inside Elections	Safe D	June 2, 2020
Politico	Likely D	April 19, 2020

==== Results ====
2020 Oregon's 5th congressional district election
Party	Candidate	Votes	%
Democratic	Kurt Schrader (incumbent)	234,863	51.9
Republican	Amy Ryan Courser	204,372	45.2
Libertarian	Matthew Rix	12,640	2.8
Write-in		771	0.2
Total votes		452,646	100.0
Democratic hold			

==== By county ====
County	Kurt Schrader Democratic		Amy Ryan Courser Republican		Various candidates Other parties		Margin		Total
County	#	%	#	%	#	%	#	%	Total
Benton (part)	4,104	48.07%	4,182	48.99%	251	2.94%	-78	-0.91%	8,537
Clackamas (part)	103,411	55.92%	76,171	41.19%	5,349	2.89%	27,240	14.73%	184,931
Lincoln	16,916	56.49%	12,109	40.44%	918	3.07%	4,807	16.05%	29,943
Marion	77,014	47.93%	78,699	48.98%	4,960	3.09%	-1,685	-1.05%	160,673
Multnomah (part)	3,478	71.96%	1,228	25.41%	127	2.63%	2,250	46.55%	4,833
Polk	21,968	46.51%	23,877	50.55%	1,391	2.94%	-1,909	-4.04%	47,236
Tillamook	7,972	48.34%	8,106	49.15%	415	2.52%	-134	-0.81%	16,493
Totals	234,863	51.89%	204,372	45.15%	13,411	2.96%	30,491	6.74%	452,646
