= Atterberry =

Atterberry may refer to:

== People ==
- Atterberry (surname)

== Places ==
- Atterberry, Illinois, United States
- Atterberry No. 10 Precinct, Menard County, Illinois, United States
