= Cliff Bentz =

American politician (born 1952)

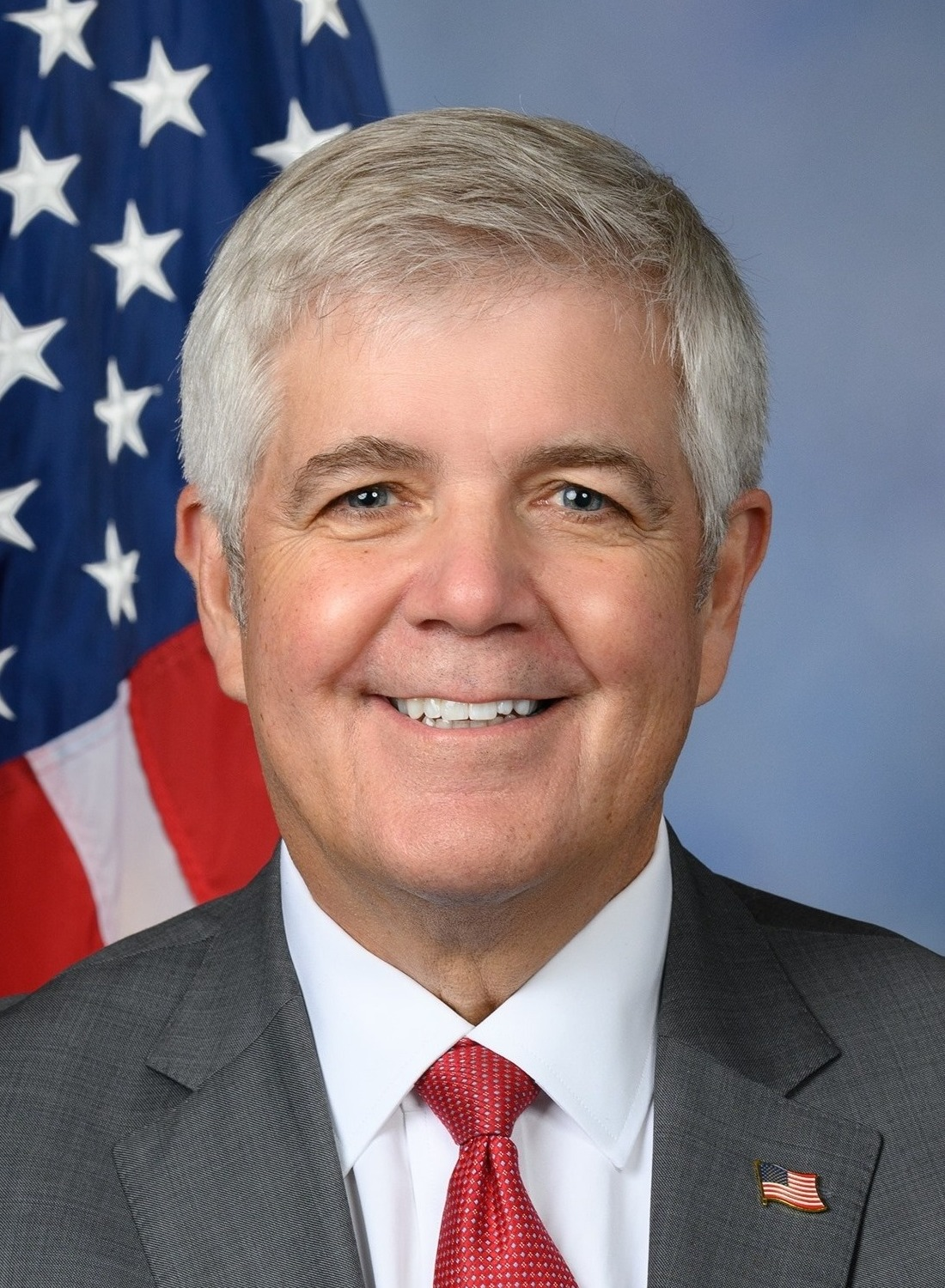
- Official portrait, 2020

Member of the U.S. House of Representatives from Oregon's 2nd district
- Incumbent
- Assumed office January 3, 2021
- Preceded by: Greg Walden

Member of the Oregon Senate from the 30th district
- In office January 4, 2018 – January 2, 2020
- Preceded by: Ted Ferrioli
- Succeeded by: Lynn Findley

Member of the Oregon House of Representatives from the 60th district
- In office January 22, 2008 – January 4, 2018
- Preceded by: Tom Butler
- Succeeded by: Lynn Findley

Personal details
- Born: Cliff Stewart Bentz; January 12, 1952 (age 74) Salem, Oregon, U.S.
- Party: Republican
- Spouse: Lindsay Norman (m. 1987)
- Children: 2
- Education: Eastern Oregon University (BA); Lewis and Clark College (JD)
- Website: House website Campaign website

Cliff Stewart Bentz (born January 12, 1952) is an American politician and lawyer serving as the U.S. representative for Oregon's 2nd congressional district since 2021. He previously served in the Oregon Senate from 2018 to 2020 and in the Oregon House of Representatives from 2008 to 2018. He is a member of the Republican Party.

Bentz was first elected to the U.S. House of Representatives in 2020. He was re-elected in 2022 and 2024.

Since 2025, Bentz is the sole Republican in Oregon's congressional delegation and is the only man representing Oregon in the U.S. House of Representatives.

== Early life and education ==
Bentz was born in Salem, Oregon, and raised on ranches in the eastern Oregon communities of Fields and Drewsey. He graduated from Regis High School in the Willamette Valley city of Stayton in 1970. He received a bachelor's degree from Eastern Oregon State College (now Eastern Oregon University) in 1974 and a J.D. from Lewis & Clark Law School in 1977.

== Career ==
From 1977 to 1980, Bentz was a law associate with the Ontario, Oregon, law firm Yturri Rose, and was made a partner in the firm in 1980, a position he still holds. He specializes in agricultural, water, and real property law. He also owns a 100-acre alfalfa farm.

=== Early political career ===
Bentz began his career as a member of the Oregon Water Resources Commission from 1988 to 1996. He served as chair of the commission from 1994 to 1996.

=== Oregon legislature ===
In 2008, Bentz was appointed by county commissioners in House District 60 to replace Tom Butler in the Oregon House of Representatives after Butler resigned to pursue a church mission. He defeated Tim K. Smith in the Republican primary in May 2008, and was unopposed in the general election. In 2010, Bentz won another term unopposed in both the primary and the general election.

On January 8, 2018, Bentz was sworn in as state senator to replace Ted Ferrioli, who resigned to take a political appointment. Bentz resigned his seat in the Oregon House and was appointed to the senate seat by the county commissioners in the senate district.

Since 2018, Bentz's largest campaign contributors have been Ironside Associates, a London-based security firm; his brother James Bentz; and his farm, Actin Ranch.

Beginning June 20, 2019, all 11 Republican state senators for Oregon, including Bentz, refused to show up for work at the Oregon State Capitol, instead going into hiding, some even fleeing the state. Their aim was to prevent a vote on HB2020, a cap-and-trade proposal that could lower greenhouse gas emissions by 2050 to combat climate change, in part by increasing fuel taxes. The Senate has 30 seats. Without the Republican senators, the remaining 18 Democratic senators could not reach a quorum of 20 to hold a vote. Republican state senators, including Bentz, continued their boycotts in 2020 to prevent the passage of climate change mitigation response, and 2021, after he left for Congress.

==== Committee assignments ====
Bentz served as vice-chair of the following committees: Transportation and Economic Development, Revenue, Joint Tax Credits, Revenue, Tax Expenditures, Carbon Reduction, and Finance and Revenue. He co-chaired the Transportation Committee and was a member of others.

== U.S. House of Representatives ==
=== Elections ===
==== 2020 ====
Bentz resigned from the Oregon State Senate effective January 2, 2020, to run in the 2020 election for Oregon's 2nd congressional district in the United States House of Representatives. He won the Republican primary and defeated Democrat Alex Spenser and Independent Patrick Archer in the general election.

=== Tenure ===
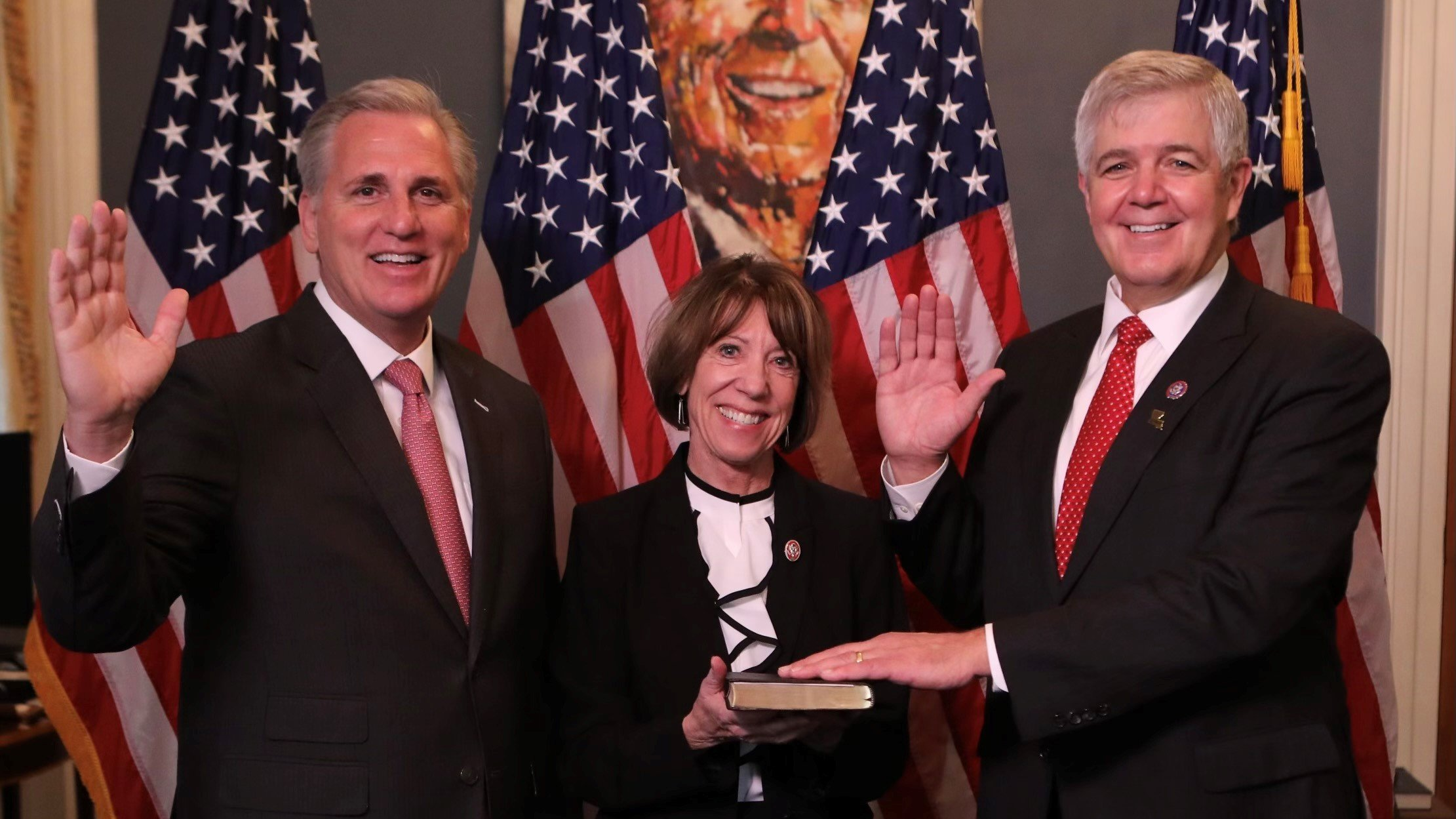
Bentz sworn into office

In the aftermath of the January 6, 2021, storming of the U.S. Capitol, Bentz was reported to have been sheltering in place during the event. In a phone interview with Oregon Public Broadcasting, he declined to call Joe Biden the president-elect, but said any outcome where Biden does not take office was "highly unlikely". The next day, Bentz joined 139 U.S. representatives who objected to Pennsylvania's electoral votes. On January 8, Bentz acknowledged that Biden would become president.

On May 19, 2021, Bentz was one of 35 Republicans who joined all 217 Democrats present in voting to approve legislation to establish the National Commission to Investigate the January 6 Attack on the United States Capitol Complex meant to investigate the storming of the U.S. Capitol.

A 2025 investigation by the Malheur Enterprise found Bentz used federal taxpayer money for "luxury" accommodations when traveling, such as visiting the $338 Davenport Hotel, $1,294 Coeur d'Alene Resort, and $381 Churchill Hotel all of which advertise themselves as luxurious.

Since the start of the second Trump administration, Bentz has voted strongly with the policies of President Donald Trump. Regarding the reversal of the "Restoring Healthy and Abundant Salmon, Steelhead, and Other Native Fish Populations in the Columbia River Basin" memorandum, Bentz stated the action was consistent with "our nation’s fight to win the race for artificial intelligence, superiority, and energy dominance." Bentz supported federal use of the Oregon National Guard in Portland, Oregon in spite a lack of evidence that any crisis existed as well as stating that he regularly tries to dispel the spread of misinformation that Portland is a lawless city. Bentz voted for Trump's Big Beautiful Bill in spite of the fact that it will potentially cut health care benefits for 70% of the children in his district. In the face of high levels of voter dissatisfaction with Trump policies, Bentz also followed Republican party line by canceling town halls with his constituents, limiting constituents access to their representative.

=== Committee assignments ===
- United States House Committee on Natural Resources
  - Subcommittee on Water, Oceans and Wildlife (Ranking Member)
  - Subcommittee on Indigenous Peoples of the United States
- Committee on the Judiciary
  - Subcommittee on Courts, Intellectual Property and the Internet
  - Subcommittee on Antitrust, Commercial and Administrative Law

=== Caucus memberships ===
- Republican Main Street Partnership
- Republican Governance Group
- BIOTech Caucus
- Congressional Western Caucus

== Political positions ==
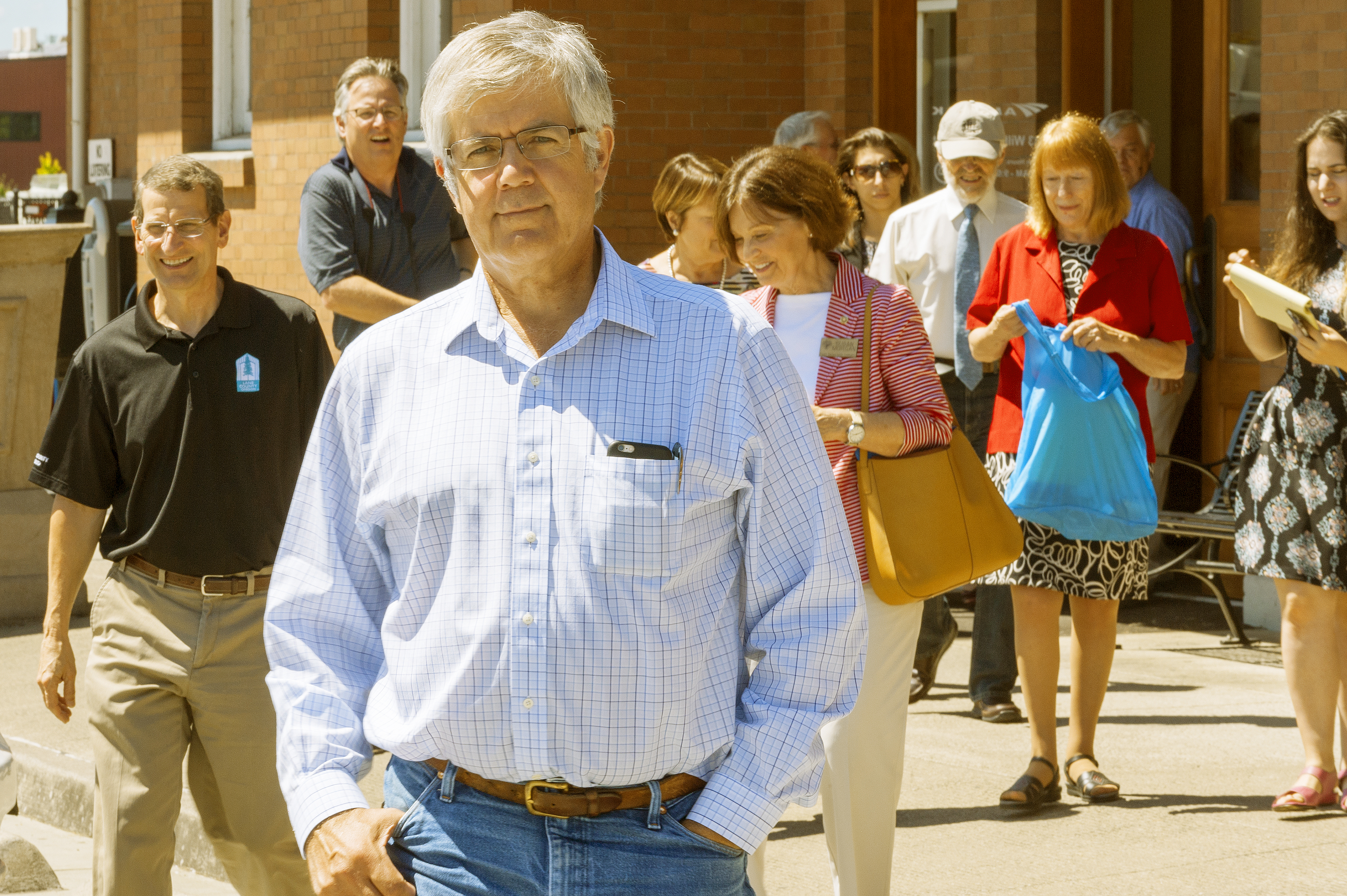
Bentz touring the Eugene Amtrak Depot

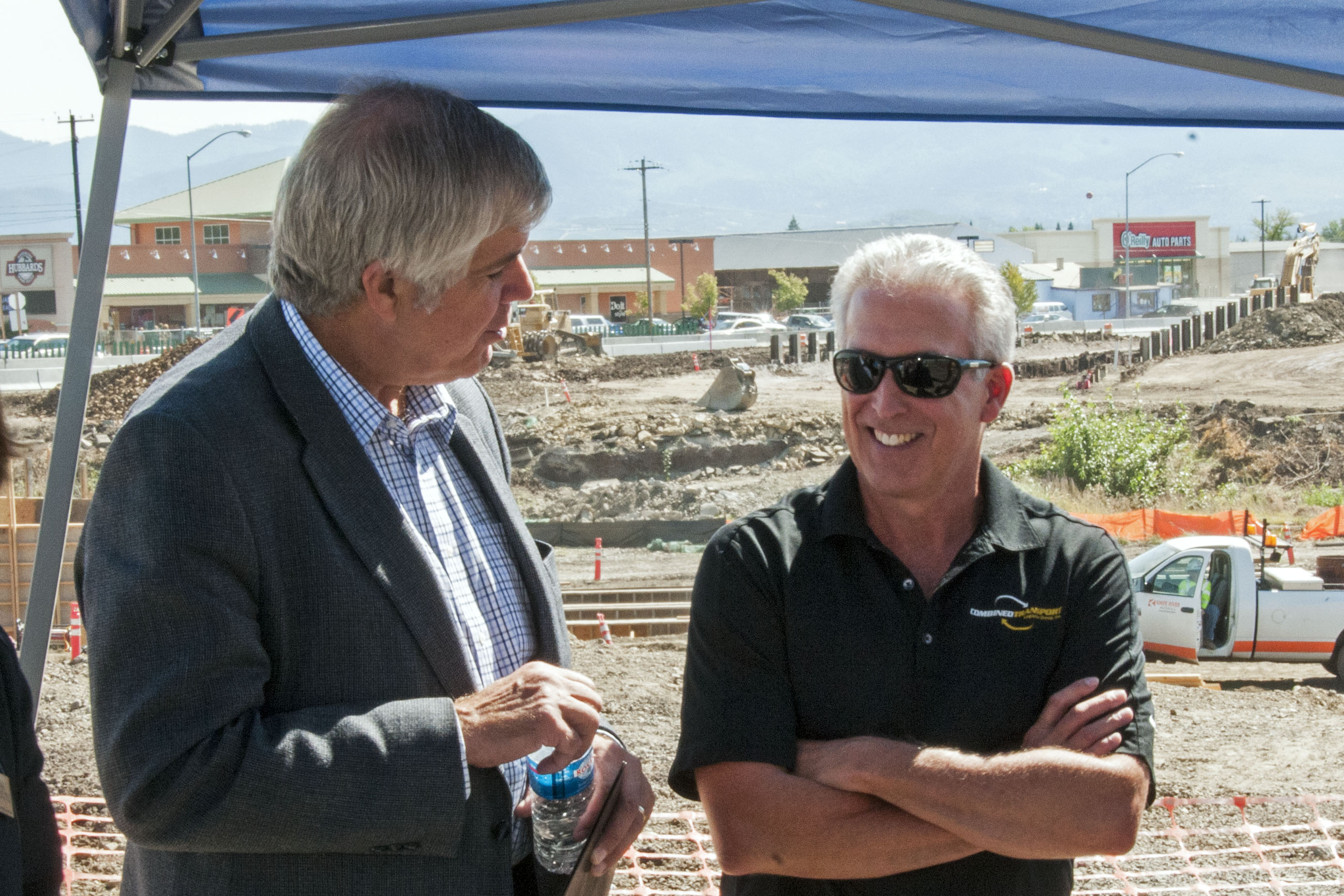
Bentz and Mike Card, Chairman of the American Trucking Associations, talk about the Oregon Route 62 Expressway Project

=== Veterans Affairs ===
On March 3, 2022, Bentz and many other Republicans voted against the Honoring our PACT Act of 2021. Bentz was the only member of Oregon's House delegation to do so.

On January 12, 2022, Bentz voted against the Guard and Reserve GI Bill Parity Act, which would expand eligibility for educational assistance under the G.I. Bill.

=== Abortion ===
Bentz describes himself as pro-life, saying, "I believe that life begins at conception and that life should be protected until death by natural causes occurs." He supports abortion only when the mother's life is at risk.

In 2019, Oregon Right to Life gave Bentz the Atterberry Award, which recognizes Oregon legislators who "are tenacious in their public defense of Oregon’s vulnerable."

=== Health care ===
Bentz has said: "I strongly oppose government run healthcare... I believe Obamacare should be replaced with solutions that focus on free market principles to help drive down the skyrocketing cost of healthcare."

On March 31, 2022, Bentz voted against the Affordable Insulin Now Act, which would cap the cost-sharing of insulin to $35 or 25% of the negotiated price (whichever is lower) for private insurance and $35 for Medicare.

=== Immigration ===
In 2021, Bentz was one of 30 Republicans who voted for the Farm Workforce Modernization Act, which would grant legal status to illegal immigrants working in agriculture and establish a pathway to permanent residency contingent on continued farm work.

=== 2020 presidential election ===
Bentz joined the Republican members of Congress who sided with the Trump campaign's attempts to overturn the 2020 United States presidential election. He voted not to certify Pennsylvania's electoral votes, citing constitutional concerns over actions taken by Pennsylvania's Secretary of the Commonwealth and Supreme Court, which he believed improperly changed election procedures without legislative approval, leading to a loss of public confidence in the process. However, he voted to certify the electoral votes from Arizona, stating that in that case, the state legislature had lawfully delegated broader authority to local election officials. In a public statement, Bentz acknowledged Joe Biden's victory and supported the peaceful transfer of power.

=== LGBTQ+ rights ===
On July 19, 2022, Bentz joined 46 other House Republicans in voting for the Respect for Marriage Act, which would repeal the Defense of Marriage Act and require each state, as well as the federal government, to recognize any marriage performed in another state. However, Bentz voted against final passage on December 8, 2022.

=== Israel ===
Bentz voted to provide Israel with support following the 2023 Hamas attack on Israel.

== Electoral history ==
2008 Oregon State Representative, 60th district
Party	Candidate	Votes	%
Republican	Cliff Bentz	17,443	98.0
Write-in		365	2.0
Total votes		17,808	100%

2010 Oregon State Representative, 60th district
Party	Candidate	Votes	%
Republican	Cliff Bentz	15,341	98.5
Write-in		233	1.5
Total votes		15,574	100%

2012 Oregon State Representative, 60th district
Party	Candidate	Votes	%
Republican	Cliff Bentz	20,310	98.7
Write-in		265	1.3
Total votes		20,575	100%

2014 Oregon State Representative, 60th district
Party	Candidate	Votes	%
Republican	Cliff Bentz	16,909	82.0
Democratic	Peter W Hall	3,662	17.8
Write-in		53	0.3
Total votes		20,624	100%

2016 Oregon State Representative, 60th district
Party	Candidate	Votes	%
Republican	Cliff Bentz	22,339	98.4
Write-in		352	1.6
Total votes		22,691	100%

2018 Oregon State Senator, 30th district (2 year term)
Party	Candidate	Votes	%
Republican	Cliff Bentz	39,536	71.7
Democratic	Solea Kabakov	15,525	28.2
Write-in		87	0.2
Total votes		55,148	100%

2020 US House of Representatives, Oregon's 2nd congressional district Republican primary
Party	Candidate	Votes	%
Republican	Cliff Bentz	37,045	31.4
Republican	Knute Buehler	25,976	22.0
Republican	Jason Atkinson	22,966	19.5
Republican	Jimmy Crumpacker	21,117	17.9
Republican	Travis A. Fager	4,201	3.6
Republican	Jeff Smith	2,494	2.1
Republican	Mark R. Roberts	1,307	1.1
Republican	Justin Livingston	1,306	1.1
Republican	David R. Campbell	410	0.3
Republican	Glenn Carey	280	0.2
Republican	Kenneth W. Medenbach	262	0.2
Republican	Write-in	447	0.4
Total votes		117,811	100.0

2020 US House of Representatives, Oregon's 2nd congressional district
Party	Candidate	Votes	%
Republican	Cliff Bentz	273,835	59.9
Democratic	Alex Spenser	168,881	36.9
Libertarian	Robert Werch	14,094	3.1
Total votes		457,433	100.0

2022 US House of Representatives, Oregon's 2nd congressional district Republican primary
Party	Candidate	Votes	%
Republican	Cliff Bentz (incumbent)	67,051	75.3
Republican	Mark Cavener	17,372	19.5
Republican	Katherine Gallant	4,598	5.2
Total votes		89,021	100.0

2022 US House of Representatives, Oregon's 2nd congressional district
Party	Candidate	Votes	%
Republican	Cliff Bentz (incumbent)	208,369	67.5
Democratic	Joseph Yetter III	99,882	32.4
Write-in		425	0.1
Total votes		308,676	100.0

2024 US House of Representatives, Oregon's 2nd congressional district
Party	Candidate	Votes	%
Republican	Cliff Bentz	224,601	63.9
Democratic	Dan Ruby	115,337	32.8
Constitution	Michael Kurt Stettler	11,255	3.2
Write-in		296	0.1
Total votes		351,489	100%

== Personal life ==
Bentz and his wife, Lindsay, a veterinarian, live in Ontario and have two children. Bentz has six siblings. He was born to Kenneth and Anne Bentz and raised on family ranches in Harney County. Bentz's grandfather Paul Stewart moved to Harney County in 1916 and purchased a small ranch, slowly trading ranches until he got the current family ranch. Bentz is a devout Roman Catholic and attends Blessed Sacrament Church in Ontario. He chaired the St. Peter Catholic grade school board for five years.

U.S. House of Representatives
Preceded by Greg Walden	Member of the U.S. House of Representatives from Oregon's 2nd congressional district 2021–present	Incumbent
U.S. order of precedence (ceremonial)
Preceded by Jake Auchincloss	United States representatives by seniority 241st	Succeeded by Stephanie Bice
