= Lynn Findley =

American politician

Member of the Oregon Senate from the 30th district
- In office January 6, 2020 – January 13, 2025
- Preceded by: Cliff Bentz
- Succeeded by: Mike McLane

Member of the Oregon House of Representatives from the 60th district
- In office January 25, 2018 – January 6, 2020
- Preceded by: Cliff Bentz
- Succeeded by: Mark Owens

City Manager of Vale
- In office July 1, 2013 – January 25, 2018
- Preceded by: Brent Barton
- Succeeded by: Allen Daniels

Malheur County Justice of the Peace
- In office August 29, 2012 – January 7, 2013
- Preceded by: Terry Thompson
- Succeeded by: Margie Mahony

Personal details
- Born: 1951 or 1952 (age 73–74) Vale, Oregon, U.S.
- Party: Republican
- Education: Treasure Valley Community College
- Website: https://lynnfindley.com

Lynn P. Findley (born 1952) is an American politician who served as a member of the Oregon State Senate from 2020 until 2025. He represented the 30th district, which covers much of Eastern Oregon.

== Biography ==
Findley was born in Vale, Oregon, graduating from Vale High School in 1970 and then from Treasure Valley Community College. He worked with the Bureau of Land Management for 32 years, retiring in 2003. He also has served on many planning and development commissions in southeastern Oregon.

In 2012, Findley ran for Malheur County commissioner, losing the Republican primary. He was appointed interim Malheur County Justice of the Peace in August 2012, following the incumbent's death, and served until January 2013, when an elected successor took office. Findley served as city manager of Vale from July 2013 until January 2018.

After Representative Cliff Bentz was appointed to the Oregon Senate following Ted Ferrioli's resignation, Findley was unanimously selected by county commissioners in the 60th district to take his seat in the House.

Findley was appointed to the Oregon State Senate District 30 on January 6, 2020, following the resignation of Cliff Bentz.

=== 2023 Unexcused absences ===
While participating in a Republican-led walkout in May 2023 Findley reached the 10 unexcused absence threshold set by measure 113, disqualifying him from running for reelection after his current term ends. Findley and 4 other Senators filed a lawsuit against Secretary of State LaVonne Griffin-Valade in response, arguing that the measure's wording allowed them to serve one additional term before being barred from reelection. On October 24 the Oregon Supreme Court agreed to hear the case with arguments beginning December 14. On February 1, 2024, the Court unanimously ruled against the Republican Senators, confirming Findley's disqualification after the end of his term in January 2025.

== Electoral history ==
Malheur County Commission Position 2 Republican primary, 2012
Party	Candidate	Votes	%
Republican	Lawrence P. Wilson	1,708	45.7%
Republican	Lynn Findley	1,681	45.0%
Republican	Brent Hasler	331	8.9%
Write-in		16	0.4%
Total votes		3,736	100.0%

2018 Oregon State Representative, 60th district
Party	Candidate	Votes	%
Republican	Lynn P Findley	18,194	98.4
Write-in		299	1.6
Total votes		18,493	100%

2020 Oregon State Senator, 30th district
Party	Candidate	Votes	%
Republican	Lynn P Findley	46,471	66.9
Democratic	Carina M Miller	22,921	33.0
Write-in		105	0.2
Total votes		69,497	100%
