= Oregon's congressional districts =

U.S. House districts

Map of Oregon's congressional districts since 2023 Interactive map version

The U.S. state of Oregon has had six United States congressional districts since 2023, when the 6th district was created as a result of the 2020 census. The 5th district was added as a result of the 1980 census, and boundaries were redrawn following the population changes to each district, as determined by the 1990, 2000, 2010, and 2020 censuses.

== Current districts and representatives ==
This is a list of United States representatives from Oregon, their terms, their district boundaries, and the district political ratings according to the CPVI. The delegation has a total of six members, including five Democrats and one Republican.

Current U.S. representatives from Oregon
District	Member (Residence)	Party	Incumbent since	CPVI (2025)	District map
1st	Suzanne Bonamici (Beaverton)	Democratic	January 31, 2012	D+20	
2nd	Cliff Bentz (Ontario)	Republican	January 3, 2021	R+14	
3rd	Maxine Dexter (Portland)	Democratic	January 3, 2025	D+24	
4th	Val Hoyle (Springfield)	Democratic	January 3, 2023	D+6	
5th	Janelle Bynum (Happy Valley)	Democratic	January 3, 2025	D+4	
6th	Andrea Salinas (Tigard)	Democratic	January 3, 2023	D+6	

== Historical Results ==
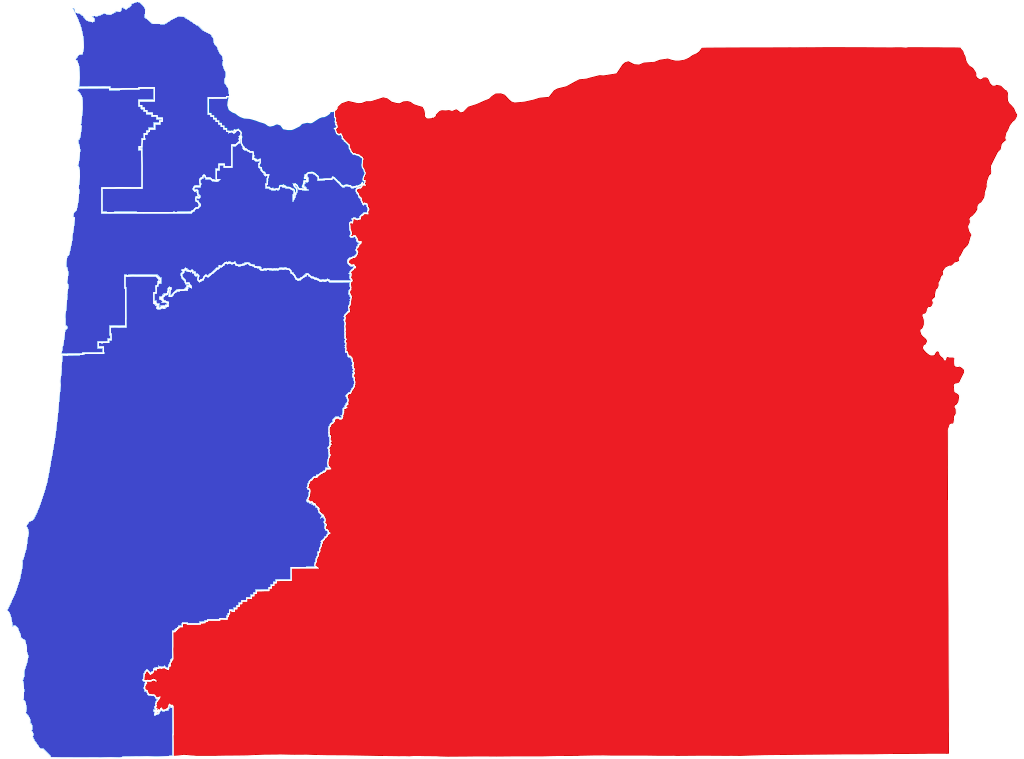
2002

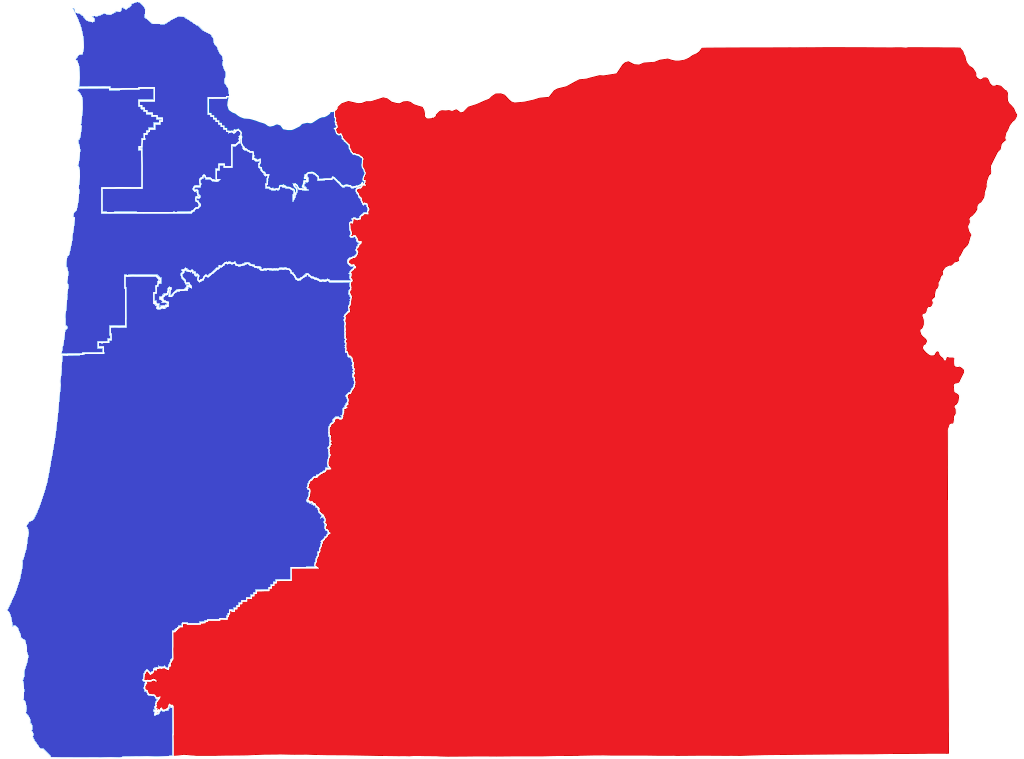
2004

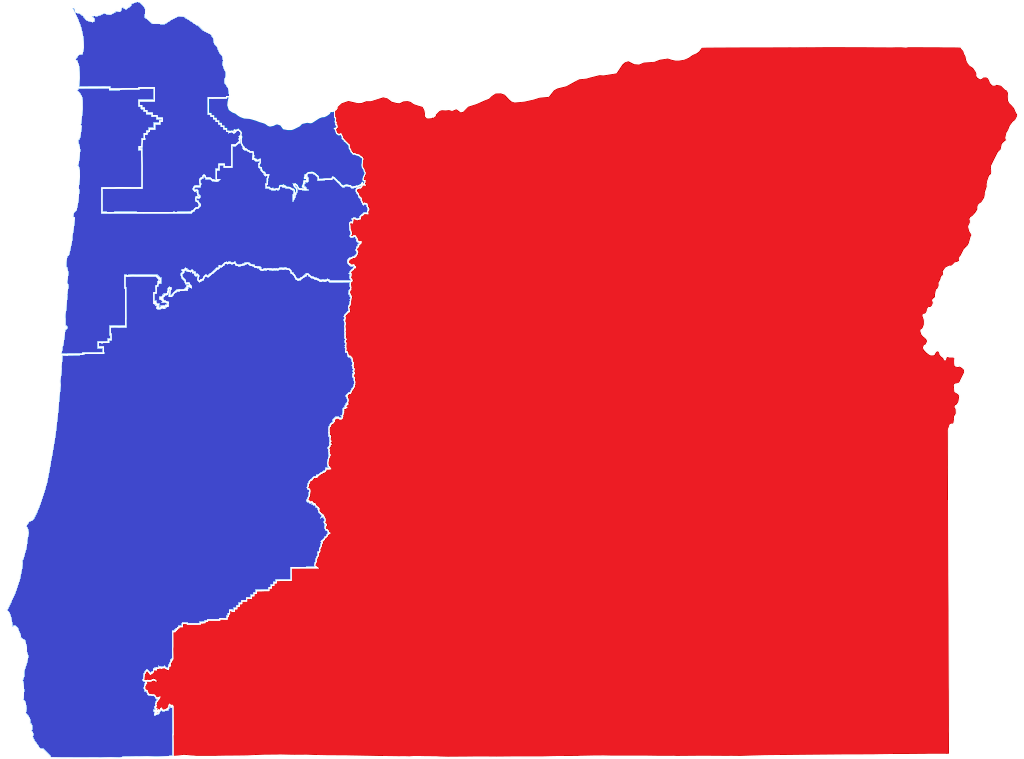
2006

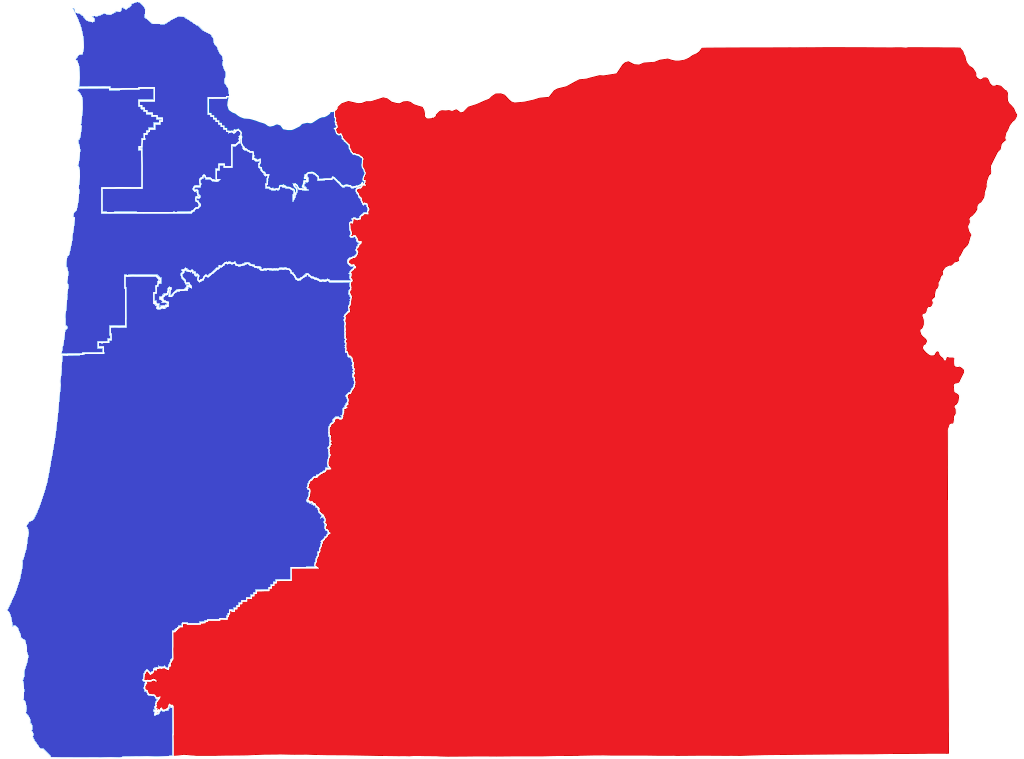
2008

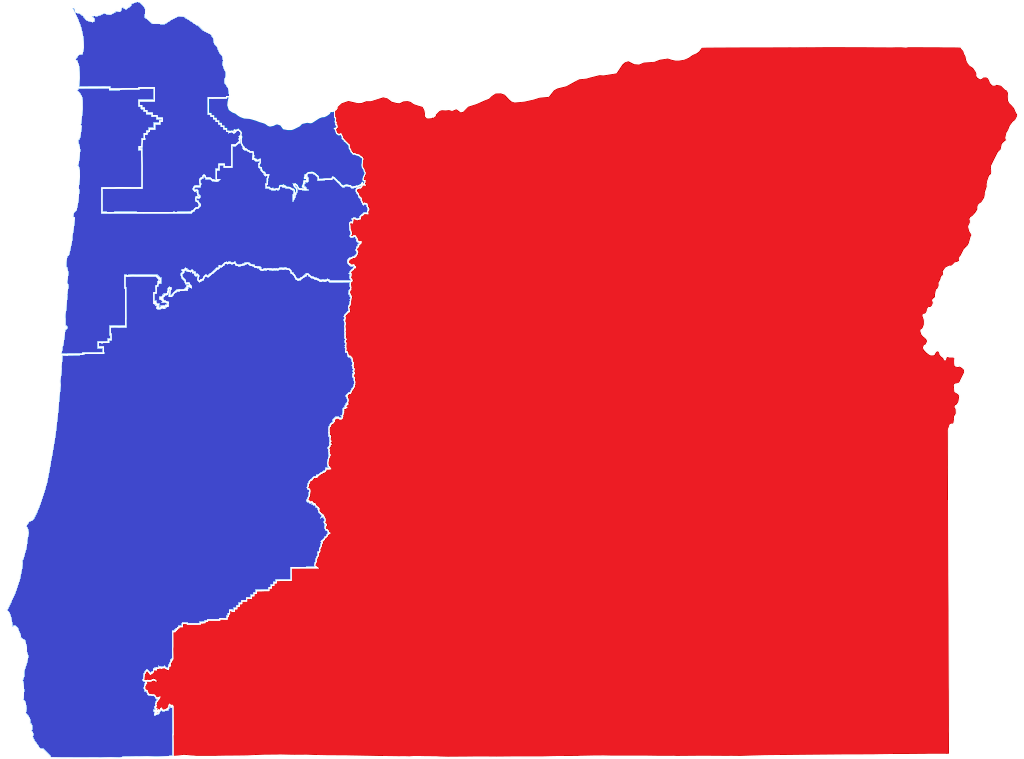
2010

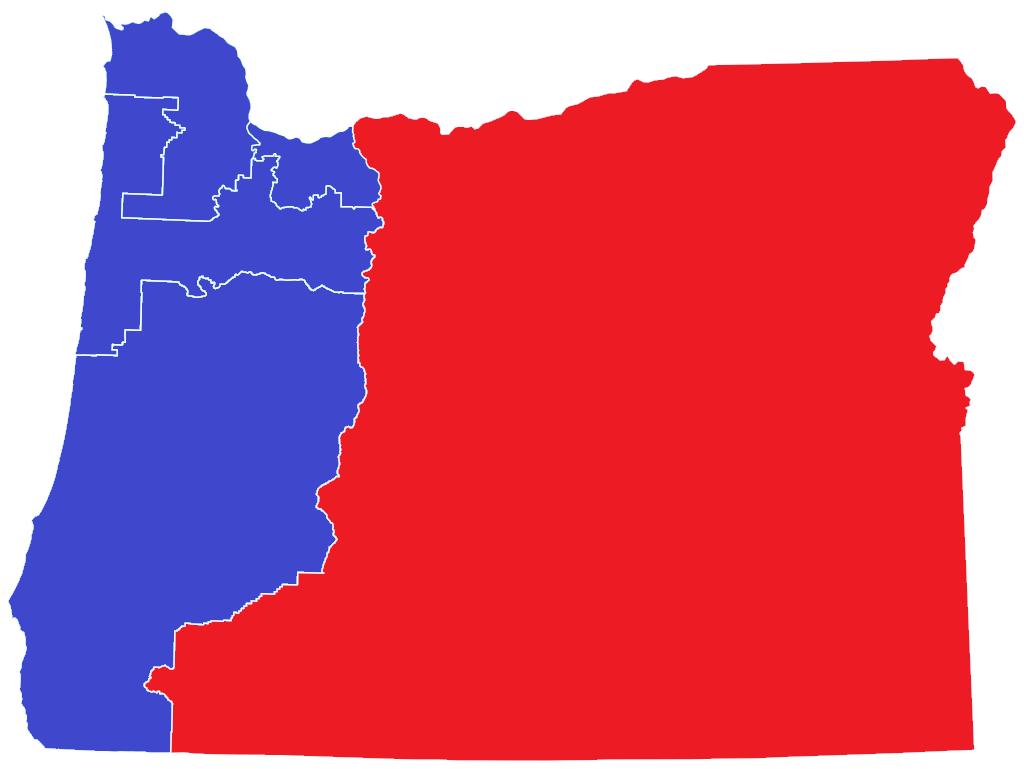
2012

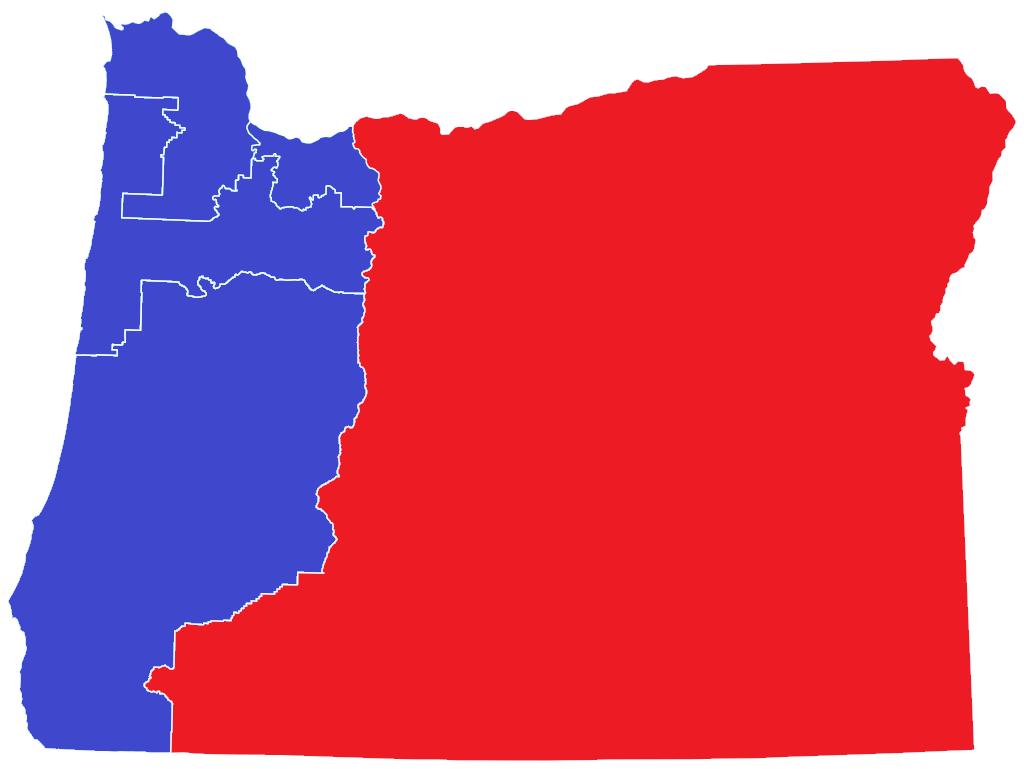
2014

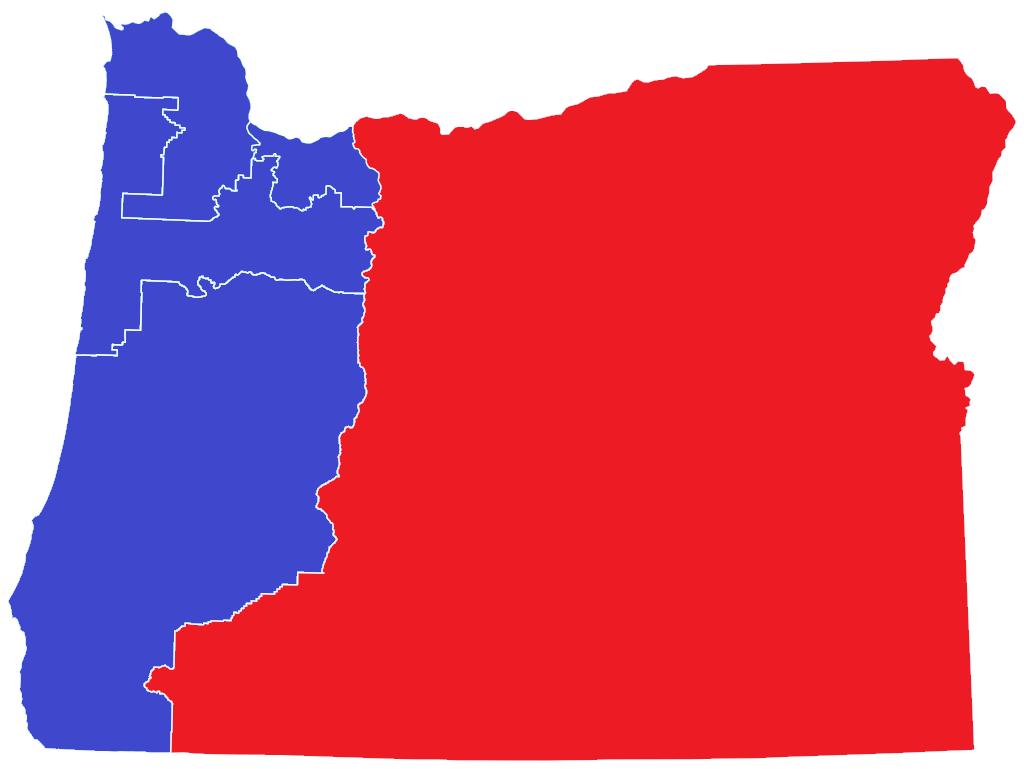
2016

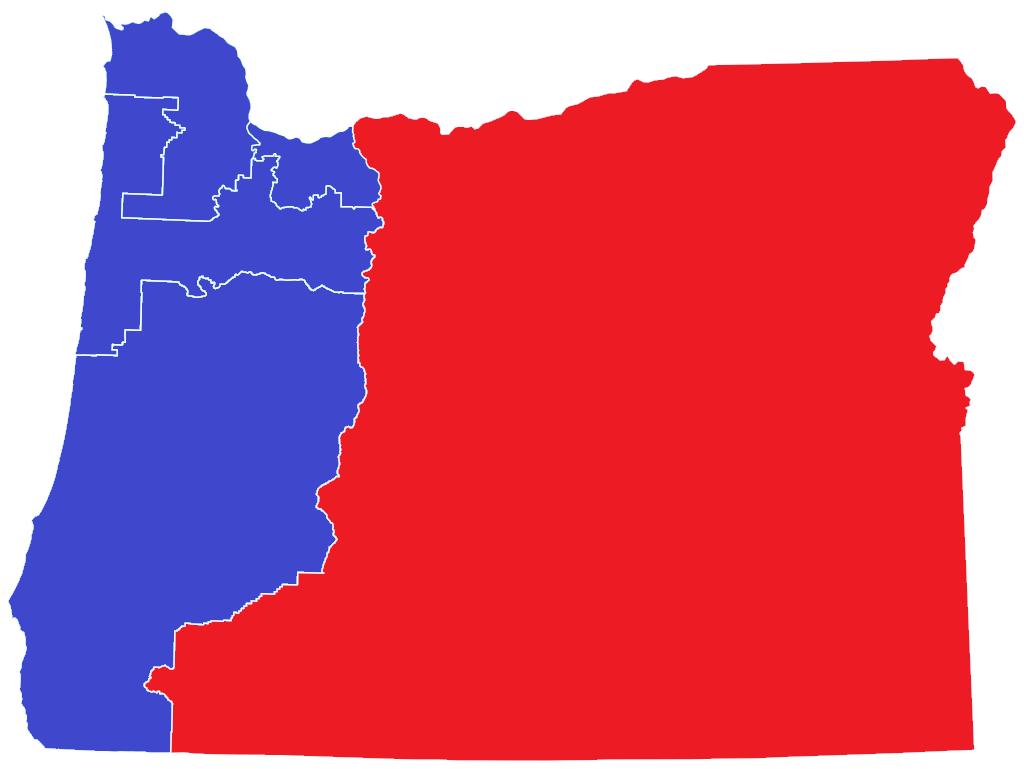
2018

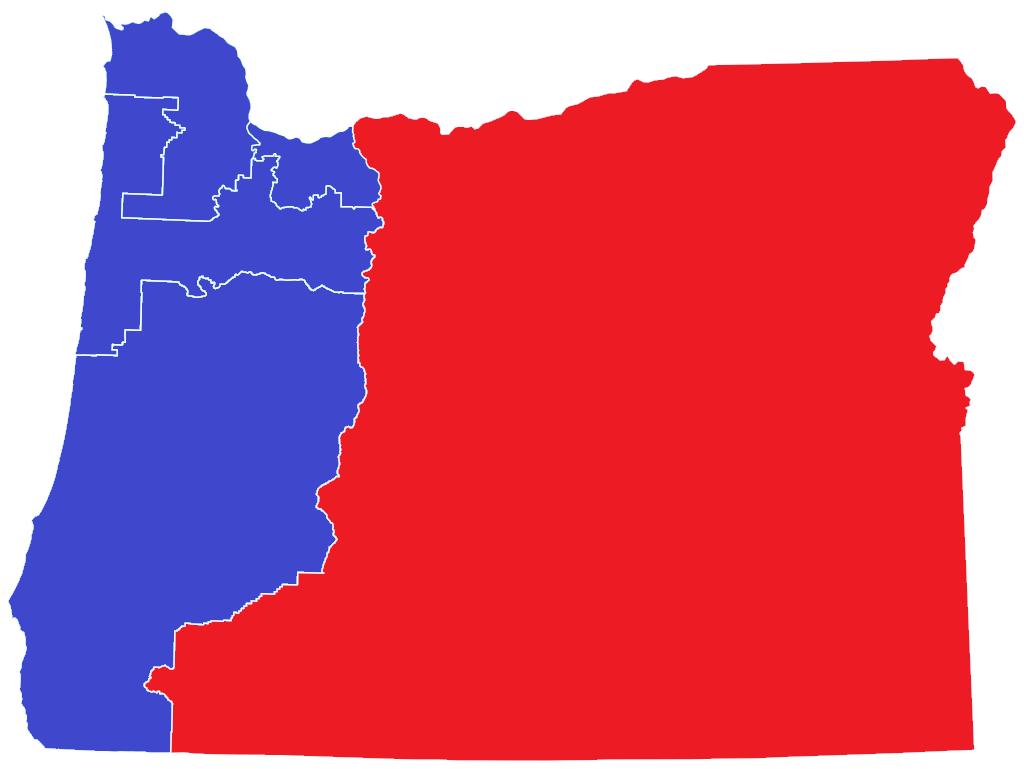
2020

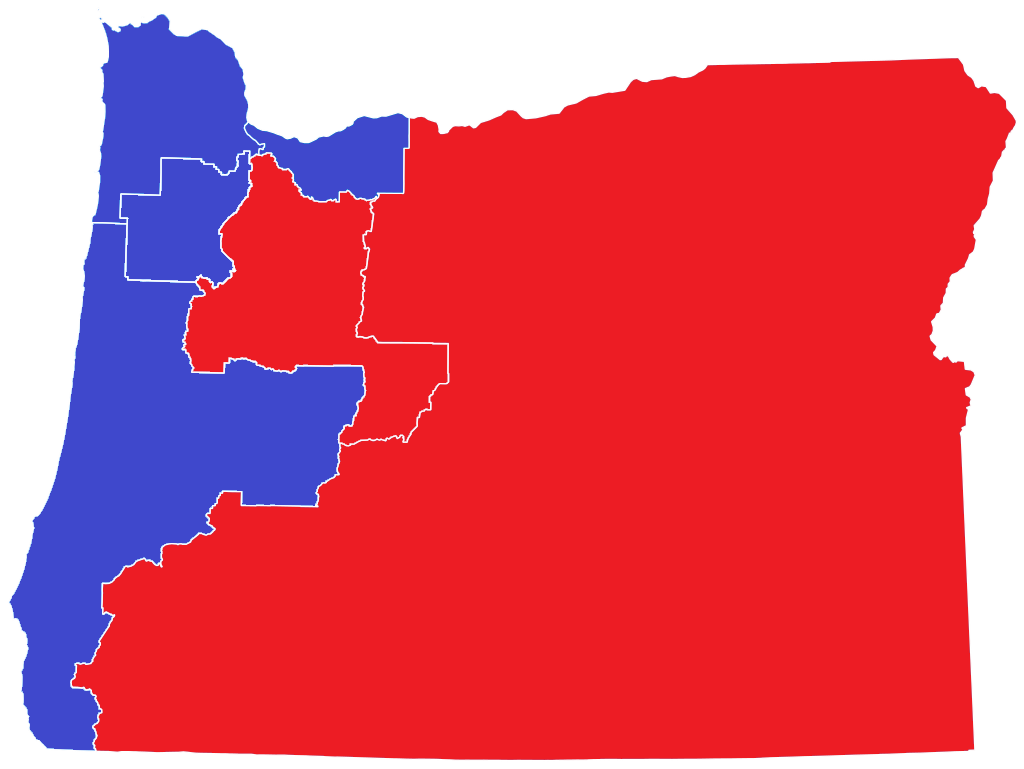
2022

== Historical and present district boundaries ==
Table of United States congressional district boundary maps in the State of Oregon, presented chronologically. All redistricting events that took place in Oregon between 1973 and 2013 are shown.

Year	Statewide map
1973–1982	
1983–1992	
1993–2002	
2003–2013	
2013–2023	
2023–2033	

== Obsolete districts ==
- Oregon Territory's at-large congressional district, obsolete since statehood
- Oregon's at-large congressional district (1859–1893)

== See also ==
- List of United States congressional districts
- Lists of Oregon-related topics
- Oregon State Senate, with a map of state senate districts
