= Mark Owens (Oregon politician) =

American politician

Member of the Oregon House of Representatives from the 60th district
- Incumbent
- Assumed office January 21, 2020
- Preceded by: Lynn Findley

Personal details
- Party: Republican

Mark Owens is an American politician and farmer serving as a member of the Oregon House of Representatives from the 60th district. He was appointed on January 21, 2020 to replace Lynn Findley.

== Background ==
Owens was raised in Boring, Oregon. He previously served as a Harney County Commissioner and as chair of the Crane School Board. Owens was appointed to the Oregon House of Representatives by the Grant County Commission in January 2020, succeeding Lynn Findley.

== Electoral history ==
2020 Oregon State Representative, 60th district
Party	Candidate	Votes	%
Republican	Mark Owens	23,252	77.4
Democratic	Beth E Spell	6,724	22.4
Write-in		51	0.2
Total votes		30,027	100%

2022 Oregon State Representative, 60th district
Party	Candidate	Votes	%
Republican	Mark Owens	24,496	89.2
Progressive	Antonio Sunseri	2,837	10.3
Write-in		131	0.5
Total votes		27,464	100%

2024 Oregon State Representative, 60th district
Party	Candidate	Votes	%
Republican	Mark Owens	25,928	98.8
Write-in		318	1.2
Total votes		26,246	100%
