= Oregon's 60th House district =

Legislative districts in the state of Oregon

Oregon's 60th House district after redistricting after the 2020 Census

District 60 of the Oregon House of Representatives is one of 60 House legislative districts in the state of Oregon. As of 2021, the boundary for the district contains all of Baker, Grant, Harney, Lake, and Malheur counties and a portion of Deschutes County. The district covers the entire southeastern corner of the state and is the largest House district in Oregon. The district is currently represented by Mark Owens of Crane. It was previously represented by Republican Lynn Findley, who was appointed to the Oregon Senate on January 6, 2020.

== Election results ==
District boundaries have changed over time. Therefore, representatives before 2021 may not represent the same constituency as today. General election results from 2000 to present are as follows:

Year	Candidate	Party	Percent	Opponent	Party	Percent	Write-in percentage
2000	Tom Butler	Republican	100.00%	Unopposed			
2002	Tom Butler	Republican	71.95%	Roxanna Swann	Democratic	27.82%	0.24%
2004	Tom Butler	Republican	98.20%	Unopposed			1.80%
2006	Tom Butler	Republican	74.29%	Peter Hall	Democratic	25.45%	0.26%
2008 (Note: Cliff Bentz was the incumbent in this election. He was appointed to this seat on January 22, 2008 to replace Tom Butler, who resigned from office.)	Cliff Bentz	Republican	97.95%	Unopposed			2.05%
2010	Cliff Bentz	Republican	98.50%	Unopposed			1.50%
2012	Cliff Bentz	Republican	98.71%	Unopposed			1.29%
2014	Cliff Bentz	Republican	81.99%	Peter Hall	Democratic	17.76%	0.26%
2016	Cliff Bentz	Republican	98.45%	Unopposed			1.55%
2018 (Note: Lynn Findley was the incumbent in this election. He was appointed to this seat on January 25, 2018 to replace Cliff Bentz, who resigned to take an appointment to the District 30 seat in the Oregon Senate.)	Lynn Findley	Republican	98.38%	Unopposed			1.62%
2020 (Note: Mark Owens was the incumbent in this election. He was appointed to this seat on January 21, 2020 to replace Lynn Findley, who resigned to take an appointment to the District 30 seat in the Oregon Senate.)	Mark Owens	Republican	77.44%	Beth Spell	Democratic	22.39%	0.17%
2022	Mark Owens	Republican	89.19%	Antonio Sunseri	Progressive	10.33%	0.48%
2024	Mark Owens	Republican	98.8%	Unopposed			1.2%

== See also ==
- Oregon Legislative Assembly
- Oregon House of Representatives
