= Ted Ferrioli =

American politician

Minority Leader of the Oregon Senate
- In office January 8, 2007 – November 15, 2017
- Succeeded by: Jackie Winters

Member of the Oregon Senate from the 30th district
- In office January 13, 1997 – November 22, 2017
- Preceded by: Greg Walden
- Succeeded by: Cliff Bentz

Personal details
- Born: February 15, 1951 (age 75) Spokane, Washington, U.S.
- Party: Republican
- Education: University of Oregon

Ted Ferrioli (born February 15, 1951) is an American politician who served as an Oregon state senator from 1997 until 2017. He represented Senate District 30, which encompasses Baker, Gilliam, Grant, Harney, Jefferson, Malheur, Sherman, Wasco, Wheeler, and portions of Clackamas, Deschutes, and Marion counties. He served as the Oregon State Senate majority leader and later as the minority leader.

== Early life ==
Ferrioli was born in Spokane, Washington on February 15, 1951. In 1959, Ferrioli moved with his family to Portland, Oregon. He graduated from Grant High School with honors in 1969. From 1969 to 1973, Ferrioli attended the University of Oregon, graduating with a Bachelor of Arts in English. During his tenure at the University of Oregon, Ferrioli served as the editor of Northwest Review magazine, as well as working various jobs for the Springfield News.

== Career ==
After graduating from college, Ferrioli was hired by the United States Department of Veteran's Affairs. In 1986, Ferrioli founded Community Relation Associates, Inc. to advocate for natural resource producers in the state of Oregon. He is also the co-founder of Oregon Lands Coalition.

Ferrioli's first elected position was on the Creswell, Oregon City Council, where he served as the chairman of the budget and police committees. Soon after, he was elected President of the Lane County Chamber of Commerce. Ferrioli also served on the Economic Improvement Commission and the Community Substance Abuse Consortium Board of Directors.

=== Legislative career ===
In 1997, Ferrioli was elected to the Oregon State Senate to represent Senate District 30.

In 2008, Ferrioli ran unopposed during the May 2008 primary election, and won reelection general election in November.

In February 2011, he apologized after making a controversial statement that Greece is a "haven for morons", in response to a letter from a singer from South Africa living in Greece, asking him to oppose a bill that would remove wolves from Oregon's endangered species list.

Ferrioli resigned effective November 22, 2017 following his appointment by Governor Kate Brown to the Northwest Power and Conservation Council.

== Electoral history ==
2004 Oregon State Senator, 30th district
Party	Candidate	Votes	%
Republican	Ted Ferrioli	38,576	98.0
Write-in		785	2.0
Total votes		39,361	100%

2008 Oregon State Senator, 30th district
Party	Candidate	Votes	%
Republican	Ted Ferrioli	35,606	97.9
Write-in		760	2.1
Total votes		36,366	100%

2012 Oregon State Senator, 30th district
Party	Candidate	Votes	%
Republican	Ted Ferrioli	38,678	98.3
Write-in		675	1.7
Total votes		39,353	100%

2016 Oregon State Senator, 30th district
Party	Candidate	Votes	%
Republican	Ted Ferrioli	40,237	70.1
Democratic	W Mark Stringer	17,001	29.6
Write-in		141	0.2
Total votes		57,379	100%
