= Drewsey, Oregon =

Unincorporated community in the state of Oregon, United States

- Unincorporated community
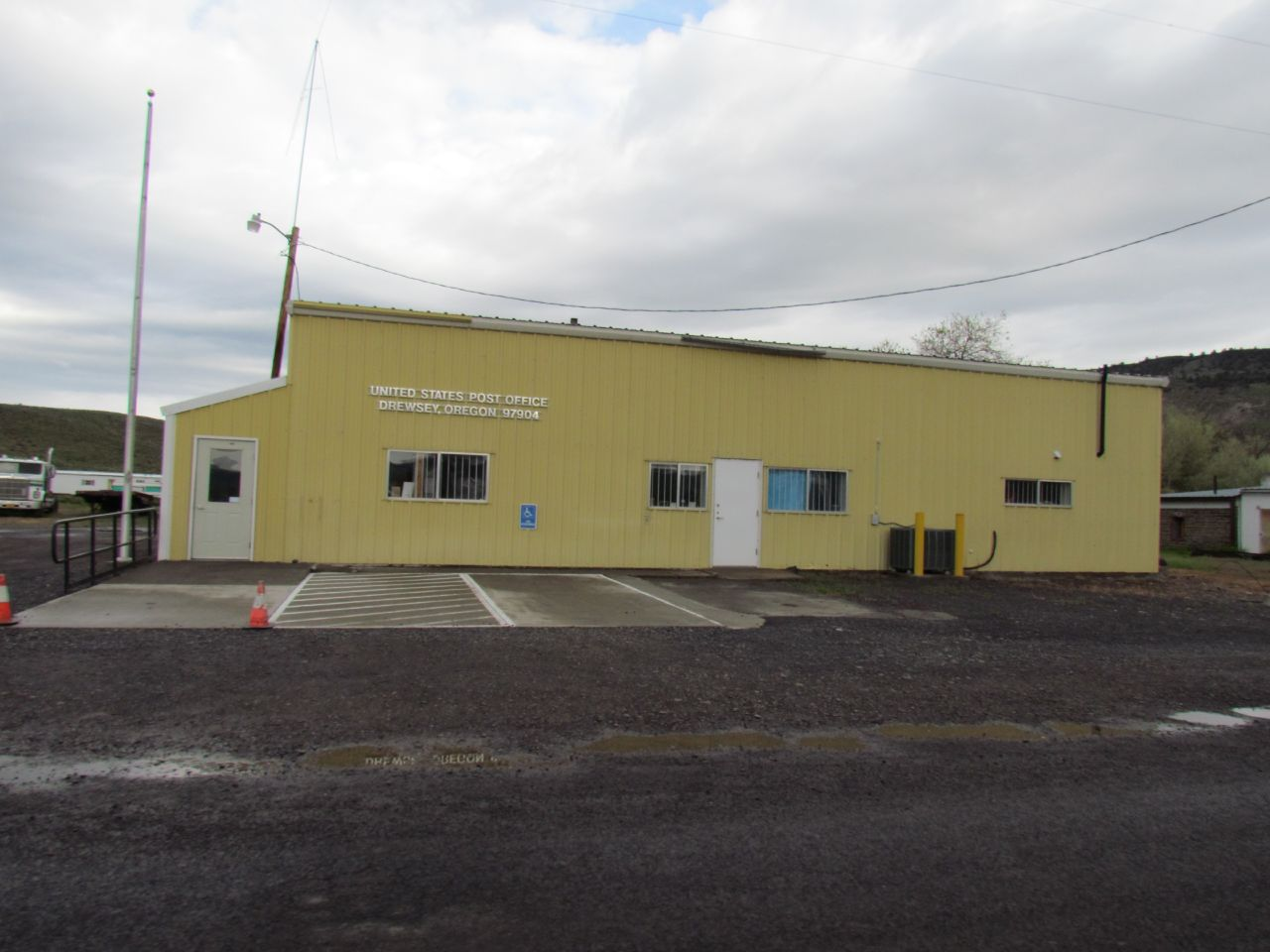
- Drewsey post office

- Location within Oregon Location within the United States
- Coordinates: 43°48′24″N 118°22′39″W
- Country: United States
- State: Oregon
- County: Harney
- Elevation: 3,514 ft (1,071 m)
- Time zone: Official: Pacific
- ZIP Code: 97904
- Area code: 541
- GNIS feature ID: 1120081

Drewsey is an unincorporated village in Harney County, in the U.S. state of Oregon. Drewsey is located along the main stem of the Malheur River, approximately 45 miles (72 km) east of Burns, two miles north of U.S. Route 20.

== Pre-history ==
The region around Drewsey was frequented by Paiute tribes long before white settlers arrived. They caught salmon in the river and its tributaries and hunted and foraged on the land. Subsequent clashes between the two cultures led to creation of the Malheur Indian Reservation, which included the Drewsey area, in 1872. There the Paiutes and others were expected to learn about white culture and to become farmers. After further clashes, the Indians were re-located from the Malheur region to reservations elsewhere in the West. By the early 1880s, settlers began establishing themselves in and around Drewsey.

== History ==
Abner Robbins opened a store here in 1883 and named the place "Gouge Eye" to commemorate a local dispute. When Robbins applied for a post office, postal authorities did not accept the original name, so he changed it to "Drusy". When the office was established in 1884, however, it was registered under the name "Drewsey".

Drewsey grew rapidly in the late 19th century, depending on farming and ranching for its economic base. The Pacific Livestock Company, two lumbers mills, and other businesses thrived here through the 1920s. However, bypassed by the nearest east−west railway as well as the main highway, Drewsey lost population during the Great Depression and after. In the 21st century, Drewsey consists of a small number of homes, a combined garage and store with a post office, a tavern and restaurant, two churches, and an elementary school.

== Geography ==
=== Climate ===
Drewsey has a continental Mediterranean climate (Köppen Dsb).

Climate data for Drewsey, Oregon, 1991–2020 normals, extremes 1970–2014
Month	Jan	Feb	Mar	Apr	May	Jun	Jul	Aug	Sep	Oct	Nov	Dec	Year
Record high °F (°C)	60 (16)	67 (19)	78 (26)	89 (32)	100 (38)	101 (38)	107 (42)	104 (40)	100 (38)	90 (32)	75 (24)	60 (16)	107 (42)
Mean maximum °F (°C)	48.8 (9.3)	54.2 (12.3)	68.0 (20.0)	78.5 (25.8)	88.0 (31.1)	94.2 (34.6)	100.1 (37.8)	98.8 (37.1)	92.6 (33.7)	80.7 (27.1)	63.7 (17.6)	49.7 (9.8)	100.9 (38.3)
Mean daily maximum °F (°C)	35.4 (1.9)	41.6 (5.3)	52.3 (11.3)	59.9 (15.5)	69.5 (20.8)	77.7 (25.4)	89.7 (32.1)	87.9 (31.1)	78.7 (25.9)	63.6 (17.6)	45.9 (7.7)	34.6 (1.4)	61.4 (16.3)
Daily mean °F (°C)	25.9 (−3.4)	30.9 (−0.6)	38.7 (3.7)	44.3 (6.8)	53.2 (11.8)	60.5 (15.8)	69.2 (20.7)	66.7 (19.3)	57.6 (14.2)	45.3 (7.4)	33.4 (0.8)	24.9 (−3.9)	45.9 (7.7)
Mean daily minimum °F (°C)	16.5 (−8.6)	20.3 (−6.5)	25.0 (−3.9)	28.8 (−1.8)	36.9 (2.7)	43.3 (6.3)	48.7 (9.3)	45.6 (7.6)	36.6 (2.6)	26.9 (−2.8)	21.0 (−6.1)	15.2 (−9.3)	30.4 (−0.9)
Mean minimum °F (°C)	−4.8 (−20.4)	0.4 (−17.6)	12.4 (−10.9)	16.2 (−8.8)	22.0 (−5.6)	31.3 (−0.4)	36.6 (2.6)	33.5 (0.8)	22.5 (−5.3)	12.4 (−10.9)	4.3 (−15.4)	−5.4 (−20.8)	−14.7 (−25.9)
Record low °F (°C)	−27 (−33)	−33 (−36)	2 (−17)	9 (−13)	13 (−11)	25 (−4)	29 (−2)	26 (−3)	11 (−12)	−5 (−21)	−17 (−27)	−36 (−38)	−36 (−38)
Average precipitation inches (mm)	1.52 (39)	1.03 (26)	1.01 (26)	0.90 (23)	1.11 (28)	0.90 (23)	0.37 (9.4)	0.28 (7.1)	0.44 (11)	0.82 (21)	1.17 (30)	1.58 (40)	11.13 (283.5)
Average snowfall inches (cm)	10.2 (26)	7.1 (18)	1.9 (4.8)	0.6 (1.5)	0.0 (0.0)	0.0 (0.0)	0.0 (0.0)	0.0 (0.0)	0.0 (0.0)	0.1 (0.25)	3.6 (9.1)	12.4 (31)	35.9 (90.65)
Average precipitation days (≥ 0.01 in)	9.5	7.9	7.8	9.0	7.8	6.3	2.7	2.6	2.7	5.3	9.5	10.1	81.2
Average snowy days (≥ 0.1 in)	5.5	3.4	1.4	0.4	0.0	0.0	0.0	0.0	0.0	0.0	2.2	6.0	18.9
Source 1: NOAA
Source 2: National Weather Service (mean maxima/minima 1981–2010)

=== Time zones ===
Although Drewsey is officially in the Pacific Time Zone, some residents choose to unofficially observe the Mountain Time Zone due to close proximity to Malheur County. Despite this, Pacific Time is strictly adhered to by businesses and the Oregon Department of Transportation.

== Education ==
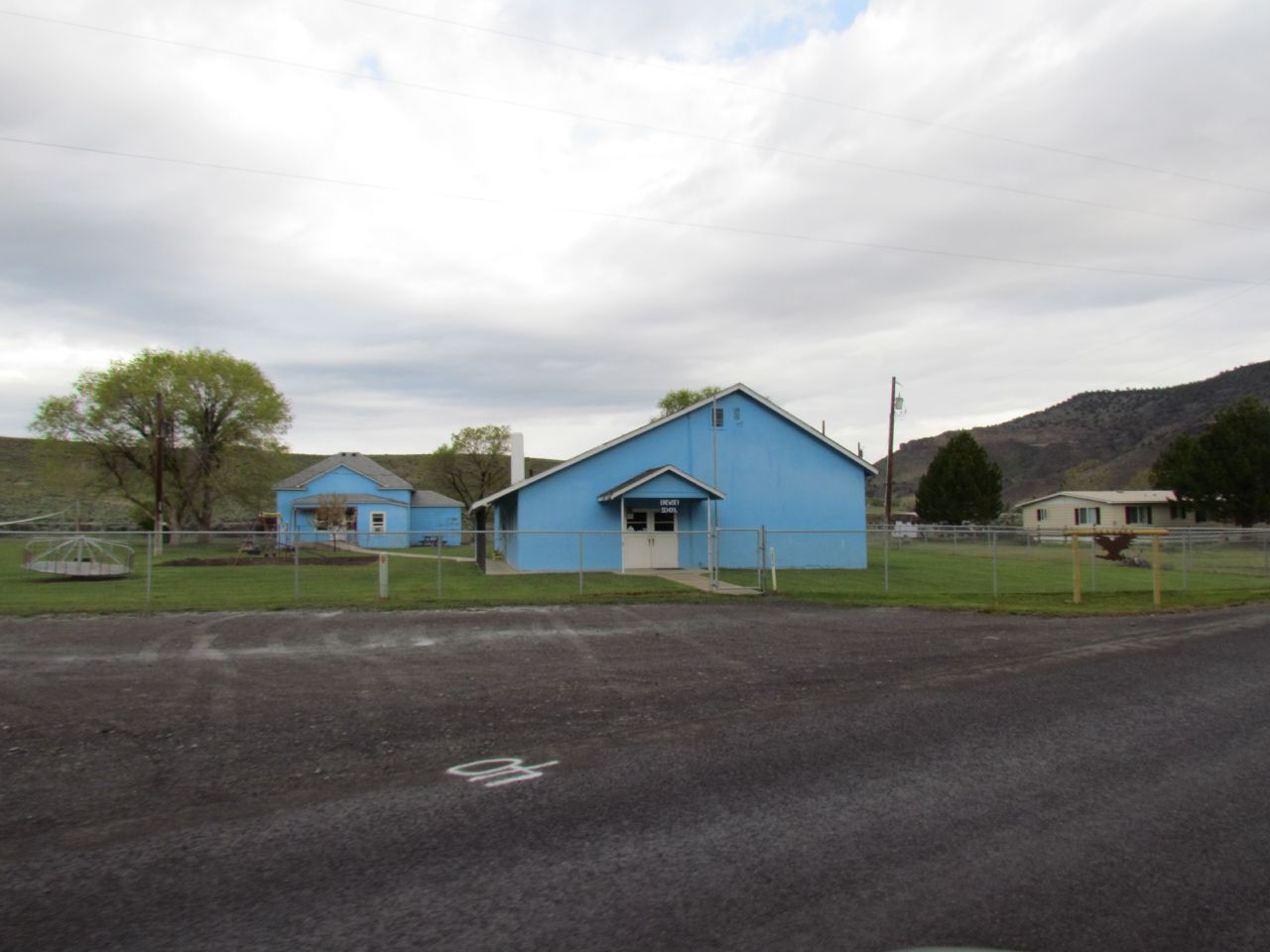
Drewsey Elementary School

Drewsey Elementary School, of Drewsey School District 13, is in Drewsey. It serves children in kindergarten through grade 8.

Pine Creek Elementary School, of Pine Creek School District 5, also has a Drewsy postal address. In 1969 Pine Creek Elementary had 8 students. In 1985, Pine Creek students heated lunches brought from their residences in the school microwave, instead of having school-served lunches.

High school students are zoned to Crane Union High School, of Harney County Union High School District 1J. In 1967, there were some Drewsey area parents who preferred sending their children to Burns Union High School instead of Crane Union, and had favored for the HSD 1J to be merged into the Burns Union High School District. As of 1987, Drewsey-area students going to Burns High live in Burns during the school week.

Harney County is not in a community college district but has a "contract out of district" (COD) with Treasure Valley Community College. TVCC operates the Burns Outreach Center in Burns.

== Infrastructure ==
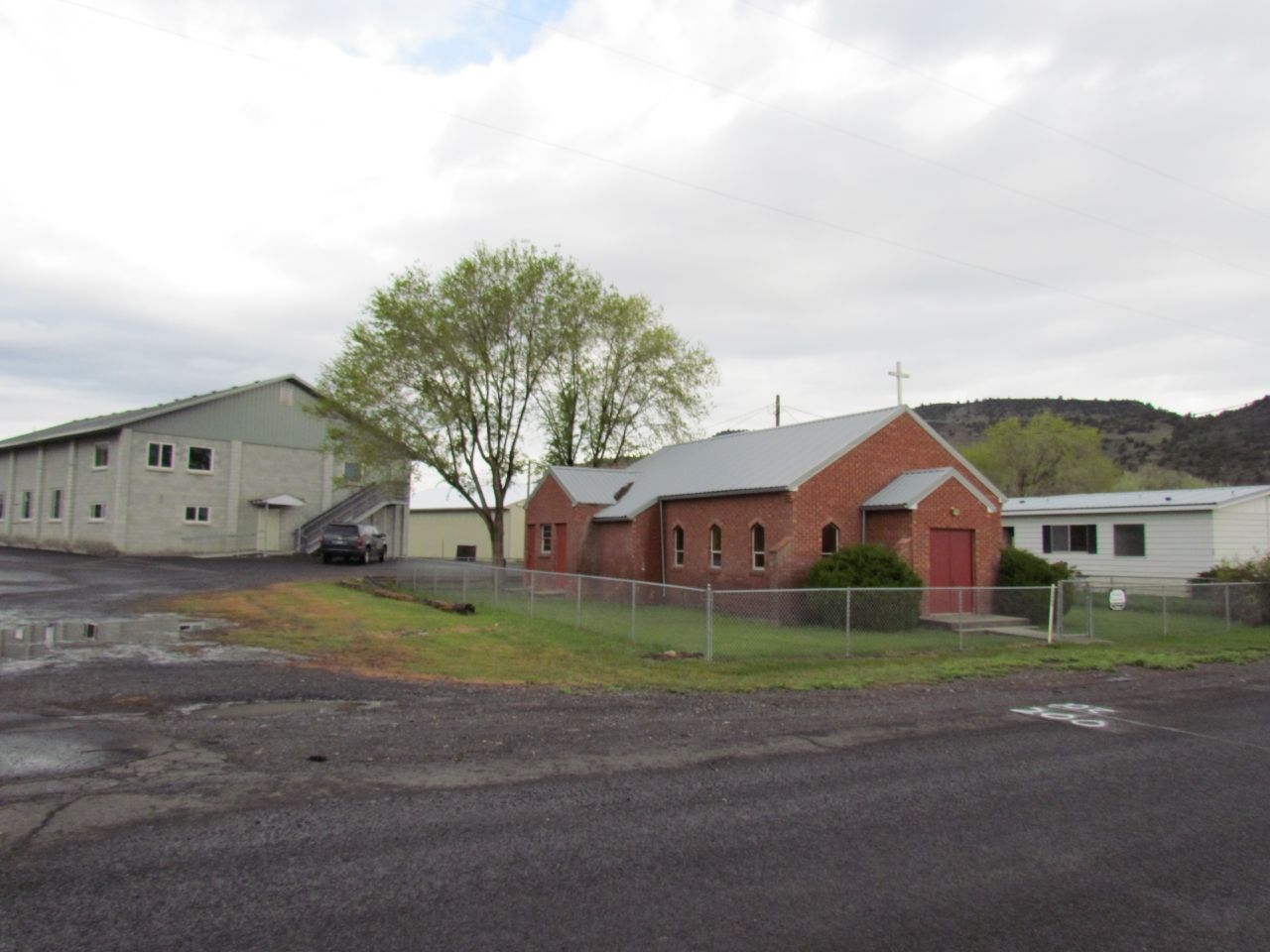
Buildings in Drewsey

=== Transportation ===
In the 21st century, there is an unmanned park-and-ride bus stop 2 miles (3.2 km) south of Drewsey on Route 20 at Drewsey Road, of the Eastern Public Oregon Intercity Transit (POINT) bus line between Bend and Ontario. The bus makes one stop per day in each direction.

Two roads for cars and trucks lead to the community. Drewsey Road links Drewsey to Route 20, to the south. Drewsey Market Road connects to rural locations to the west along the Malheur River.

== Healthcare ==
In 1989, Nellie Nix of The Bulletin described the catchment area of Harney District Hospital in Burns as being Harney County. In 2005, Harney District Hospital provided a traveling doctor in a mobile trailer for southern parts of the county, which included Drewsey.
