= Oregon's 30th Senate district =

American legislative district

Oregon's 30th Senate District as of September 27, 2021

District 30 of the Oregon State Senate comprises all of Baker, Crook, Grant, Harney, Lake, and Malheur counties, as well as parts of Deschutes and Jefferson counties. The district is composed of Oregon House districts 59 and 60 and is the largest state Senate district in Oregon. It is currently represented by Republican Mike McLane of Powell Butte.

== Election results ==
District boundaries have changed over time. Therefore, senators before 2013 may not represent the same constituency as today. From 1993 until 2003, it covered a slightly different area in eastern Oregon; from 2003 until 2013, it extended to cover Gilliam, Jefferson, Sherman, Wasco, and Wheeler counties and parts of Deschutes and Lake counties; and from 2013 until 2023, it lost all of these gains except western Wasco County, northern Deschutes County, and Jefferson County.

The current district is more compact and adds all of Crook and Lake counties, which have historically been a part of other districts, while losing parts of northern Jefferson County and northern Deschutes County as well as all of Wasco and Wheeler counties.

The results are as follows:

Year	Candidate	Party	Percent	Opponent	Party	Percent	Opponent	Party	Percent
1984	Gene Timms	Republican	51.6%	Mark Stringer	Democratic	48.4%	No third candidate		
1988	Gene Timms	Republican		Unopposed					
1992	Gene Timms	Republican	64.0%	Trish Seller	Democratic	36.0%	No third candidate		
1996	Gene Timms	Republican	70.8%	Jennifer Carper	Democratic	27.7%	Rohn Webb	Socialist	1.4%
2000	Steve Harper	Republican	71.4%	Debra M. James	Democratic	28.4%	No third candidate		
2004	Ted Ferrioli	Republican	98.0%	Unopposed					
2008	Ted Ferrioli	Republican	97.9%	Unopposed					
2012	Ted Ferrioli	Republican	98.3%	Unopposed					
2016	Ted Ferrioli	Republican	70.1%	Mark Stringer	Democratic	29.6%	No third candidate		
2018	Cliff Bentz (Note: Off-cycle election due to the resignation of Ted Ferrioli in 2017 after his appointment by Governor Kate Brown to the Northwest Power and Conservation Council. Cliff Bentz was the incumbent in this election as he was appointed to fill the vacant seat.)	Republican	71.7%	Solea Kabakov	Democratic	28.2%	No third candidate		
2020 (Note: Off-cycle election due to the resignation of Cliff Bentz in 2020 after his election to the House of Representatives representing Oregon's 2nd district. Lynn Findley was the incumbent in this election as he was appointed to fill the vacant seat.)	Lynn Findley	Republican	66.9%	Carina Miller	Democratic	33.0%	No third candidate		
2024	Mike McLane	Republican	98.4%	Unopposed					
