= Atterberry (surname) =

Atterberry is a surname. Notable people with the surname include:

- Bo Atterberry (born 1975), American football coach
- Derrick Atterberry (born 1972), American football player

== See also ==
- Vanessa Atterbeary (born 1975), American attorney and politician
