= Red Hill volcanic field =

Volcanic field in New Mexico, United States

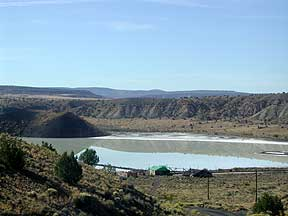
- Zuñi Salt Lake

Geography
- Location: Catron County, New Mexico, United States

Geology
- Mountain type: Volcanic field
- Volcanic zone: Basin and Range Province

Red Hill volcanic field, also known as Quemado volcanic field, is a monogenetic volcanic field located in the vicinity of the ghost town of Red Hill in Catron County New Mexico. Red Hill is 24 kilometers (15 mi) east of the larger Springerville volcanic field and includes Zuñi Salt Lake. The area is made up of scoria cone and silicic dome fields. Over 40 volcanic vents have been identified in the field. These erupted basaltic flows, with no other rock types evident in the field.

The largest crater in the field is Quemado crater, which is 1,170 meters (3,840 ft) across and 33 meters (108 ft) below the surrounding terrain, with a slightly elevated rim. This crater shows evidence of cycles of collapse and explosive eruption. It is surrounded by olivine basalt flows.

The field is part of the Jemez Lineament, a zone of young volcanic fields stretching from central Arizona to northeastern New Mexico. Ar-Ar dating of rock from the Red Hill volcanic field reveals that it was erupted in two pulses, from 7.9-5.2 million years ago (Mya) and from 2.5 to 0.071 Mya. The older activity was along a narrow zone roughly aligned with the lineament, while later activity was across a broad north-south zone, with the focus of activity tending to move south to north. Future activity is most likely in the northern part of the field.

== Notable vents ==
| Name | Elevation | Coordinates | Last eruption |
| Quemado crater | - | 34°13′21″N 108°49′19″W | 1.55 Mya |
| Red Hill cone | - | 34°17′36″N 108°53′31″W | 71 kya |
| Zuni Salt Lake (maar) | 1,897 m or 6,224 ft | 34°27′00″N 108°46′04″W | 86 kya |

== See also ==
- List of volcanoes in the United States
- List of volcanic fields
