= Caja del Rio =

Landform in New Mexico, United States

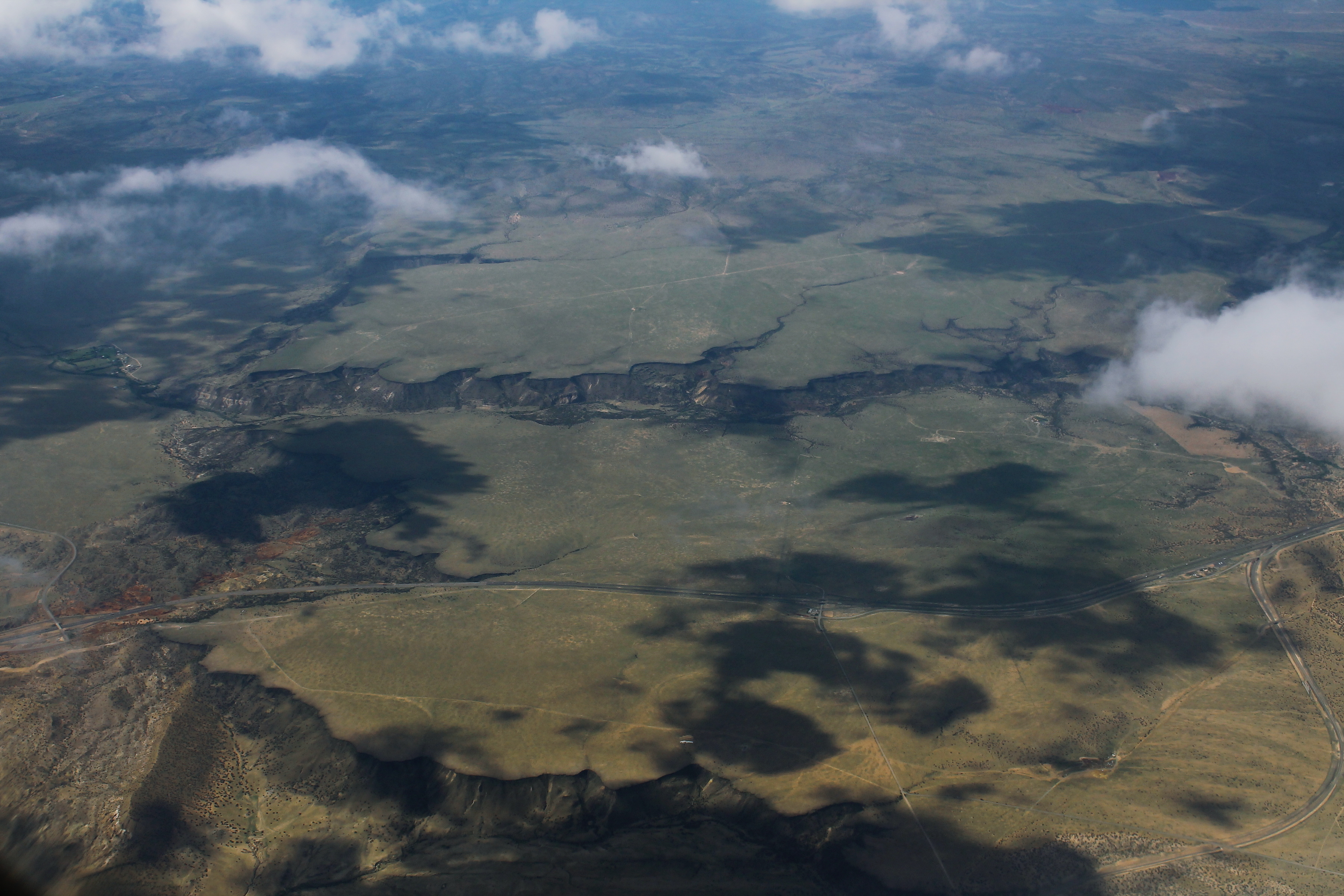
- Aerial photograph of the La Bajada Mesa, with Interstate 25 passing through

Highest point
- Elevation: 7,472 ft (2,277 m)
- Coordinates: 35.6883°N 106.18°W

Geography
- Location within New Mexico
- Location: Santa Fe County, New Mexico, New Mexico, United States

Geology
- Rock type(s): Cinder cones, spatter cones basalt outflows

Caja del Rio (Spanish: "box of the river") is a dissected plateau, of volcanic origin, which covers approximately 84,000 acres (34,000 ha) of land in northern Santa Fe County, New Mexico, United States. The region is also known as the Caja, Caja del Rio Plateau, and Cerros del Rio. The center of the area is approximately 15 miles (24 km) west of Santa Fe, New Mexico. Most of the Caja is owned by the United States Forest Service and managed by the Santa Fe National Forest. Access is through New Mexico Highway 599, Santa Fe County Road 62, and Forest Service Road 24.

== Geography ==
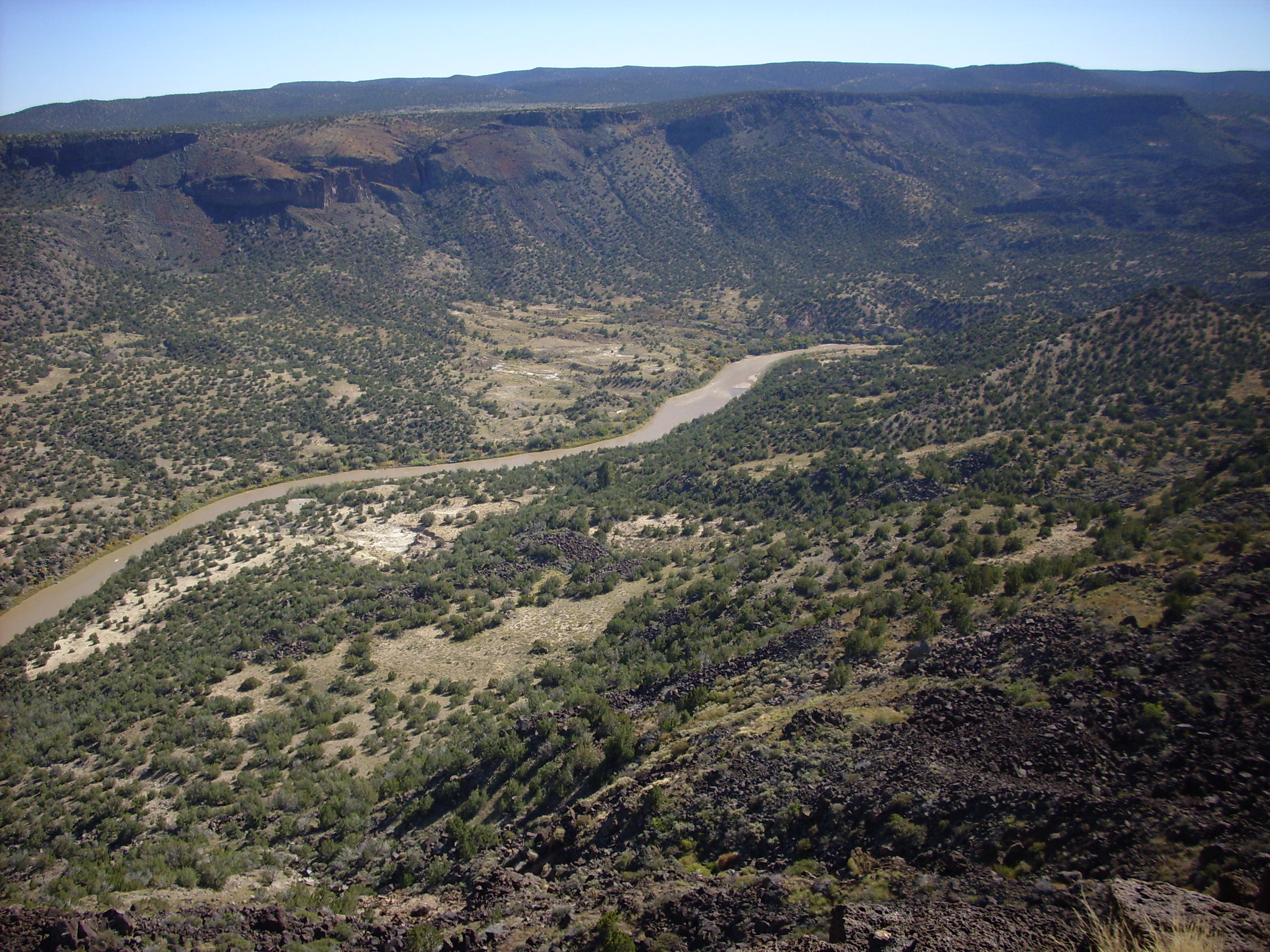
View of the Caja del Rio in the distance, across White Rock Canyon from the Pajarito Plateau at Overlook Park, White Rock, New Mexico

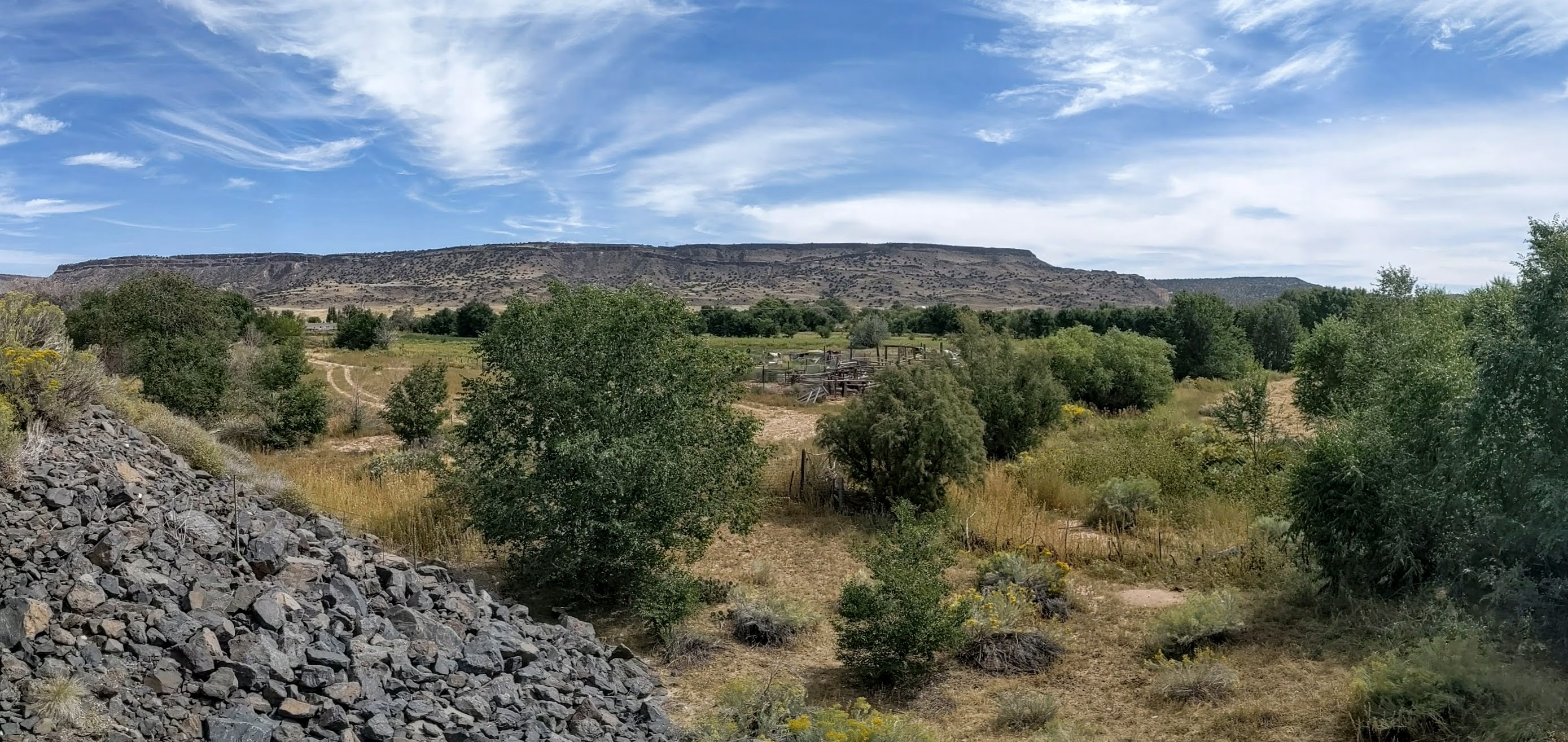
La Bajada Mesa from the valley of the Santa Fe River at La Bajada, New Mexico. The switchback route of the old El Camino Real de Tierra Adentro is visible at top center.

The landscape of the Caja del Rio Plateau is generally flat to rolling terrain, with numerous steep cones rising up to 7,472 feet (2,277 m) above the plains. The highest points in the immediate area are the unnamed high point 800 feet (240 m), Cerro Micho (7,326 feet (2,233 m)), Montoso Peak (7,315 feet (2,230 m)), Ortiz Mountain (7,188 feet (2,191 m)), and Cerro Rito (7,296 feet (2,224 m)) The entire plateau is within the watershed of the Rio Grande; portions of the Caja drain into the larger river through two tributaries: the Santa Fe River and Cañada Ancha.

Virtually the entire perimeter of the Caja is ringed by cliffs or escarpments. White Rock Canyon forms the northwestern edge of the plateau. This canyon, through which the Rio Grande flows, has a maximum depth of over 1,000 feet (300 m). Bandelier National Monument lies directly across the river to the west of the plateau. Along the eastern edge is Canada Ancha, an ephemeral stream that flows northward into the Rio Grande near Buckman. Another deep canyon (approximately 400 feet (120 m) in depth) runs along the southern edge of the Caja, cut by the Santa Fe River. The canyon of the Santa Fe River separates the Caja land grant from another land grant to the south: the Mesita de Juana Lopez Grant.

At the southern part of the Caja is La Bajada Mesa, dominated by Tetilla Peak (7,203 feet (2,195 m)). The western edge of the mesa is a large escarpment known as La Bajada (Spanish: "the descent"), which is easily visible to highway traffic traveling north on Interstate 25 from Albuquerque to Santa Fe. After crossing the Santo Domingo Basin and the reservations of Cochiti and Santo Domingo Pueblo, the freeway makes a steep climb up the escarpment. Further north along La Bajada, at La Bajada Hill, is the site of the old route of El Camino Real de Tierra Adentro, the road from Mexico City to Santa Fe, which was also the original path of Route 66; it involves a tortuous series of 23 switchbacks up the bajada road, which is now closed. La Bajada traditionally forms the southern boundary of the río arriba or upper river area of New Mexico, also known as Northern New Mexico.

== Geology ==
The Caja del Rio plateau is a monogenetic volcanic field, which includes approximately 60 cinder cones, spatter cones, and basalt outflows. The volcanism can be explained by the field's location, which is very close to the intersection of the Rio Grande rift and the Jemez Lineament. These structural weaknesses create a thinned crust, and pathways for intrusion by magma originating in the mantle. The result has been a series of intracontinental basaltic eruptions.

The Rio Grande rift is a result of extensional, (or divergent) tectonic forces exerted upon the American Southwest. This feature runs southward from the vicinity of Leadville, Colorado, through the entire state of New Mexico, through the vicinity of El Paso, Texas, and into Chihuahua, Mexico. The rift began forming approximately 30 million years ago during the late Oligocene Epoch. The Rio Grande rift takes the form of a series of basins, each offset to the right from the previous basin as one travels along the rift. The Caja del Rio volcanic field lies almost on top of the Bajada Constriction Zone, which is the zone of offset between the Albuquerque Basin to the southwest and the Espanola Basin to the northeast.

The Jemez Lineament is another, older feature, which also represents a linear weakness in the crust. The Lineament trends southwest to northeast, and underlies a string of volcanic features across Arizona and New Mexico. Those features include the San Carlos volcanic field, Springerville volcanic field, Zuni-Bandera volcanic field, Mount Taylor volcanic field, the Jemez volcanic field, the Taos Plateau volcanic field, and the Raton-Clayton volcanic field. The Caja del Rio volcanic field lies in the southeastern part of the Jemez volcanic field.

The lavas erupted in the Caja are diverse in their characteristics, ranging from basalt with a silica content of 49% to dacite with a silica content of 63%. Most are alkali basalts and hawaiites, which are basaltic lavas low in silica and mildly enriched in alkali metal oxides. These originated in the Earth's mantle but mingled with melted crust on their way to the surface. The more silica-rich lavas incorporated more melted crust and are described as evolved magmas. The hawaiites have unusual trace element compositions, suggesting they originated in the remnants of the Farallon plate known to lie below western North America.

Eruptions came in three phases. The first and most voluminous phase lasted from about 2.7 to 2.6 million years ago. The lavas erupted during this phase were mostly basalt and basaltic andesite. Because of their low silica content, these lavas were highly fluid, and spread out to form most of the plateau. The eruptive centers, which included Cerro Montoso, Cerro Colorado, and Tetilla Peak, are mostly large composite cinder cones. The second phase, which lasted from about 2.5 to 2.2 million years ago, was more prolonged but much less voluminous and included a wide range of compositions, including andesite that makes up much of the higher terrain of the Caja del Rio. The final phase, from 1.5 to 1.1 million years ago, was restricted to a small area in lower White Rock Canyon east of the Rio Grande. These flows were basaltic andesite and dacite, and all overlie the lower Bandelier Tuff (Otowi Member) and the youngest overlies the upper Bandelier Tuff (Tsherige Member).

One of the scoria cones of the Caja del Rio, the Cienega volcano (35.618°N 106.134°W), has been quarried since 1919 for cinder. The quarry has exposed part of the deep plumbing of the volcano, which has been studied for clues to the nature of magmatic plumbing systems under cinder cones. The volcano itself has been radiometrically dated as 2.73 ± 0.06 million years old and erupted through three vents in at least two stages.

Basalt flows on the west side of White Rock Canyon, across from the Caja, are considered geologically part of the Caja del Rio volcanic field. These are mostly composed of tholeiitic basalt, which is similar to the basalt erupted at mid-ocean ridges.

Many of the flows of the Caja del Rio are covered with a mantle of sand, probably originating in the Rio Grande floodplain to the southwest and brought in by prevailing winds.

The Caja is not the only volcanic feature in this part of New Mexico. Approximately 20 miles (32 km) to its northwest is the Valles Caldera, a spectacular caldera which lies at the heart of the Jemez Mountains. This mountain range has been created by a series of eruptions since the Miocene. The ages of the first eruptions are difficult to determine, since the older rocks have been almost entirely buried by the material from younger eruptions. The oldest exposed volcanic rocks in the vicinity are approximately 16 million years old. The Jemez area experienced an intense pulse of basalt volcanism between 9 and 11 million years ago. The lavas from this cycle had little silica, and originated in the mantle. Additional pulses of volcanism occurred between 7-10 million years ago, between 6-7 million years ago, between 3-6 million years ago, and between 2-3 million years ago. The last of these pulses is believed to have created the Cerros del Rio volcanic field, which covers the entire Caja del Rio Plateau.

== Climate ==
The climate of the Caja del Rio is arid and continental. The average daily maximum temperature at White Rock, New Mexico varies from 37.9 °F (3.3 °C) in January to 80.5 °F (26.9 °C) in July. The average daily minimum temperature varies from 18.8 °F (−7.3 °C) in January to 54.4 degrees in July. That average annual maximum temperature is 60.0 °F (15.6 °C), with the average annual minimum at 35.8 °F (2.1 °C). The average annual precipitation is approximately 10 inches (250 mm)-12 inches (300 mm). Most of the annual precipitation is associated with summer thunderstorms, although the area also receives winter snow.

== Ecology ==
Soils in the Caja del Rio are derived from Tertiary volcanic basalt flows and cinder cone eruptions. Most are best characterized as stony or cindery loam, with shallow horizons. Soil surveys of the Caja generally describe the soils as unsatisfactory, with a reduced potential for hydrologic and nutrient function.

Three primary plant communities are frequently found on the Caja del Rio plateau: pinon-juniper savanna, pinon-juniper woodland, and Great Basin sage scrub. The most prevalent vegetative communities consist of a pinon (Pinus edulis) and juniper (Juniperus monosperma) overstory with a short grass understory. Tree densities often range between 100 and 300 trees per 1-acre (4,000 m^{2}). Another large community consists of open grassland, with blue grama (Bouteloua gracilis), galleta (Pleuraphis jamesii), and various species of Stipa being the most common grasses. Common woody shrubs include chamisa (Chrysothamnus nauseosus), Apache plume (Fallugia paradoxa), four-wing saltbush (Atriplex canescens), and big sagebrush (Artemisia tridentata).

Predatory mammals known to live in the Caja del Rio include black bear (Ursus americanus), mountain lion (Felis concolor), bobcat (Lynx rufus), coyote (Canis latrans), fox (Vulpes spp.), gray fox (Urocyon cinereoargenteus), ringtail (Bassariscus astutus), badger (Taxidea taxus), long-tailed weasel (Mustela frenata), western spotted skunk (Spilogale gracilis), and striped skunk (Mephitis mephitis). Non-predatory mammals known to be present include Rocky Mountain elk (Cervus elaphus), mule deer (Odocoileus hemionus), raccoon (Procyon lotor), porcupine (Erethizon dorsatum), black-tailed jackrabbit (Lepus californicus), desert cottontail, (Sylvilagus auduboni), white-throated woodrat (Neotoma albigula), Botta's pocket gopher (Thomomys bottae), Colorado chipmunk (Neotamias quadrivittatus), pinyon mouse (Peromyscus truei), and deer mouse (Peromyscus spp.). Sensitive mammalian species known to be present at the Caja include Gunnison's prairie dog (Cynomys gunnisoni). A small herd of wild horses (consisting of approximately 50 individuals) lives year round on the plateau.

Birds of prey found in or near the Caja include bald eagle (Haliaeetus leucocephalus), golden eagle (Aquila chrysaetos), red-tailed hawk (Buteo jamaicensis), ferruginous hawk (Buteo regalis), Swainson's hawk (Buteo swainsonii), American kestrel (Falco sparverius), and peregrine falcon (Falco peregrinus anatum). Other resident non-migratory birds include Merriam's turkey (Meleagris gallopavo), pinyon jay (Gymnorhinus cyanocephalus), hairy woodpecker (Picoides villosus), and scaled quail (Callipepla squamata).

Migratory birds found in or near the Caja include turkey vulture (Cathartes aura), killdeer (Charadrius vociferus), loggerhead shrike (Lanius ludovicianus), common nighthawk (Chordeiles minor), mourning dove (Zenaida macroura, broad-tailed hummingbird (Selasphorus platycercus), ladder-backed woodpecker (Picoides scalaris), downy woodpecker (Picoides pubescens), northern flicker (Colaptes auratus), gray flycatcher (Empidonax wrightii), Say's phoebe (Sayornis saya), ash-throated flycatcher (Myiarchus cinerascens), Cassin's kingbird (Tyrannus vociferans), plumbeous vireo (Vireo plumbeus), horned lark (Eremophila alpestris), violet-green swallow (Tachycineta thalassina), northern rough-winged swallow (Stelgidopteryx serripennis), blue-gray gnatcatcher (Polioptila caerulea), western bluebird (Sialia mexicana), mountain bluebird (Sialia currucoides), Townsend's solitaire (Myadestes townsendi), American robin (Turdus migratorius), American pipit (Anthus rubescens), black-throated gray warbler (Setophaga nigrescens), western tanager (Piranga ludoviciana), chipping sparrow (Spizella passerina), lark sparrow (Chondestes grammacus), western meadowlark (Sturnella neglecta), and brown-headed cowbird (Molothrus ater). Waterfowl using the Rio Grande corridor include Canada goose (Branta canadensis), mallards (Anas platyrhynchos), northern pintails (Anas acuta), and American wigeon (Mareca americana).

Sensitive bird species known to be present at the Caja include bald eagles, peregrine falcons, and gray vireos.

Common reptiles include collared lizards (Crotaphytus collaris), roundtail horned lizard (Phrynosoma modestum), striped whipsnake (Masticophis taeniatus), and western diamondback rattlesnake (Crotalus atrox). Sensitive reptilian species include the desert kingsnake (Lampropeltis getula splendida).

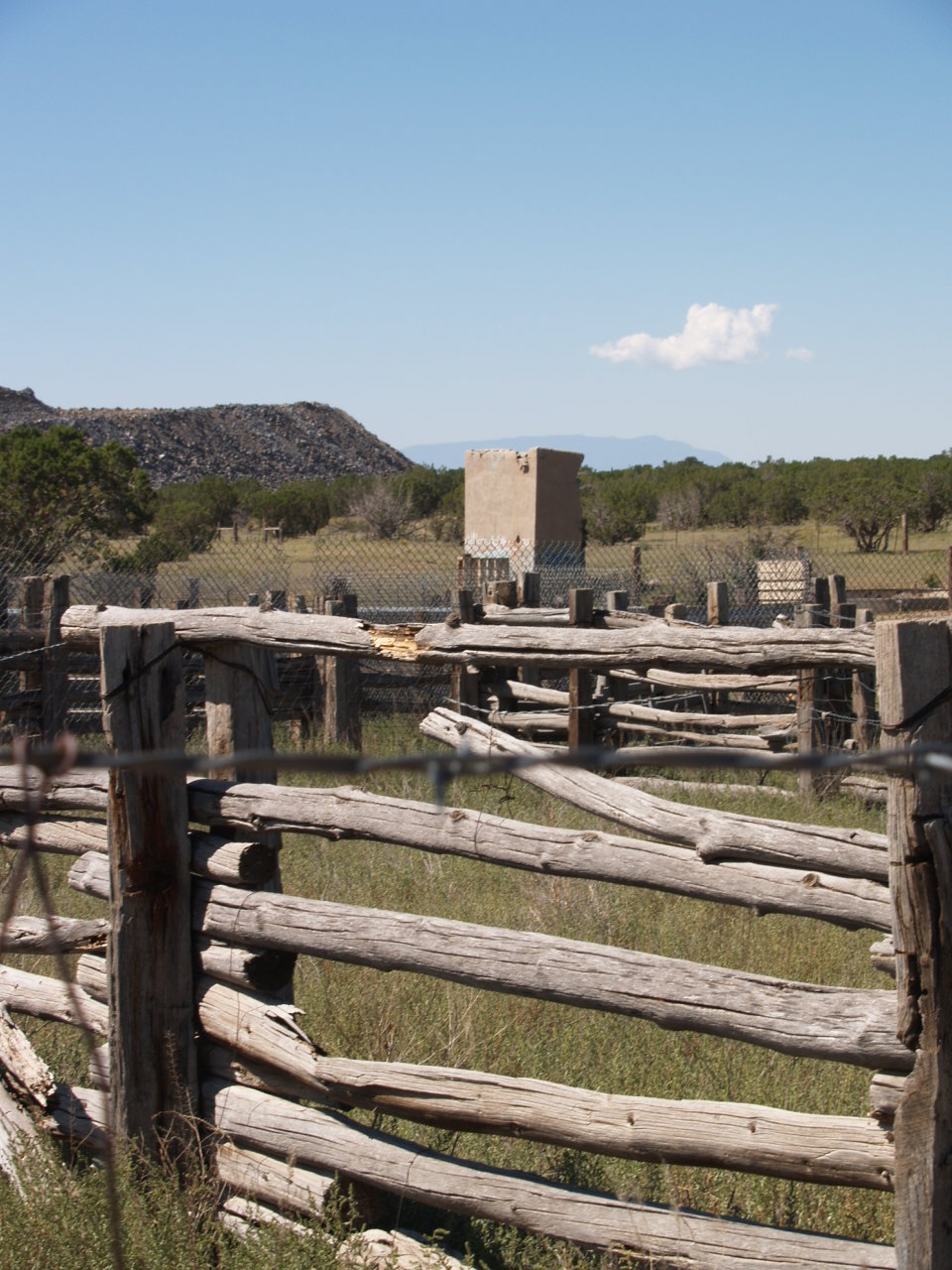
Livestock corrals at the Headquarters trailhead

== Human use and management ==
Prehistoric Puebloans built dozens of village sites across the Caja del Rio and Pajarito plateaus. In contrast to its western neighbor, however, the canyon walls of the Caja are frequently made of basalt, rather than welded tuff. The latter material is much easier to excavate, and as a result, the Pajarito contains many more cliff houses. Both areas, however, contain countless petroglyphs. Most of them have been pecked into the ubiquitous basalt.

Europeans founded Santa Fe in 1610. It is likely that use of the Caja del Rio for the grazing of domesticated livestock began shortly thereafter. From the beginning of colonization until the 19th century, subsistence users treated the plateau as common property, and used it for summer grazing and timber harvesting. During the mid-19th century, commercial livestock ranching increased throughout New Mexico. By the 1890s, grazing levels throughout the Territory were as high as 9 million animal units. This overuse, combined with severe droughts in 1891 and 1892, led to the loss of top soils and major vegetative changes. Among the vegetative changes were the replacement of more palatable forbs and grasses by woody shrubs and trees.

At the beginning of the 20th century, the Forest Service began to address the problem of degraded rangelands. The new solutions included the reduction of grazing permits and the institution of range improvement programs. In 1935, the government purchased portions of the Caja del Rio Grant and the Majada Grant under the "Land Program" of the Federal Emergency Relief Administration. That acreage forms what is today the Caja del Rio Unit of the Santa Fe National Forest. Range surveys, maps, and a range management plan were completed by 1939. In the same year, the Soil Conservation Service assumed administration of the federal lands pursuant to a cooperative agreement among the Indian Services, Resettlement Administration, and the SCS. Responsibility for management was passed to the Forest Service in 1953. The Caja is now managed as a geographically distinct unit of the Espanola District of the Santa Fe National Forest. This unit consists of approximately 67,197 acres (27,194 ha) in 2010. The Taos Field Office of the Bureau of Land Management manages additional acreage just outside the forest unit.

The Caja del Rio Allotment is now managed as a community grazing allotment. Beginning in 1941, most of the existing allotment improvement were repaired or reconstructed. From 1954 to 1972, the average actual use was 711 permitted cattle. In 2010, the Forest Service allows a maximum of 8,305 animal unit months. That capacity is divided among twelve permittees who graze 492 cow-calf pairs and 28 bulls on ten pastures, in a yearlong season. The allotment was restocked after 2002 due to drought, and has been below maximum rates since then.

The allotment contains 18 earth tanks, 7 wells, 31 miles (50 km) of pipelines, 14 drinking troughs, 10 storage tanks, and 77 miles (124 km) of fencing. In 2006, the water supply was substantially improved by the completion of the Caja del Rio Pipeline.

== Points of interest ==
From 2004, the Caja has been the focus of a grass roots campaign to develop recreational trail uses. The purpose of this campaign is to augment use of the Caja, rather than replacing grazing. The trail system is used primarily by mountain bike and horse riders.

=== Wild horses ===
The United States Forest Service has designated Caja del Rio a Wild Horse Territory, and manages a herd of mustangs there. A separate band of feral horses in the vicinity is not managed; its members are thought to be domestic horses recently turned loose to fend for themselves.

=== Diablo Canyon ===
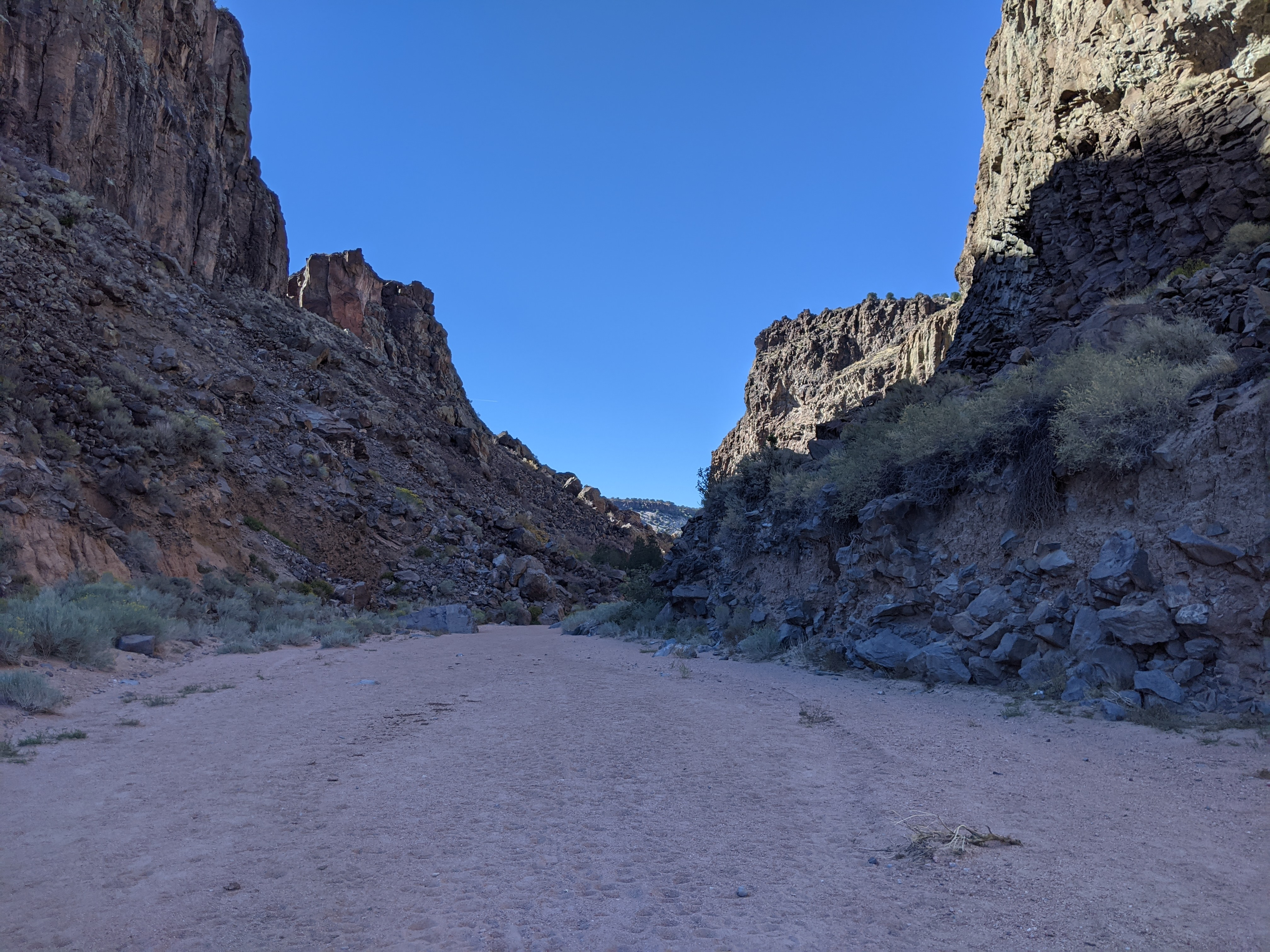
Looking down Caja del Rio Canyon

Caja del Rio Canyon (known locally as Diablo Canyon), is a popular local rock climbing area on the northern section of Canada Ancha, near its confluence with the Rio Grande. This area can be accessed by Camino La Tierra and Old Buckman Road. Although the area is not marked, it has an undeveloped but very large parking area at its east end. The canyon walls include impressive trap rocks. The flat, sand bottom of the canyon is subject to spectacular flash floods during the summer monsoon season. The hike from Diablo Canyon to the Rio Grande is both scenic and easy White Rock Canyon. The wash is also popular with horse riders. After passing Diablo Canyon, Old Buckman Road continues to the site of Buckman, a former logging town and depot of the narrow gauge Chili Line. The Rio Grande can be forded in some seasons at Buckman. In fact, this crossing was a major transportation route between Santa Fe and the Pajarito Plateau.

Diablo Canyon was a filming location for the 2007 film 3:10 to Yuma.

=== Caja trails ===
The Caja has around 100 miles (160 km) of mapped trails. Some of the more notable trails include:

- Chino Mesa Trail – 8 miles (13 km) (one way) of two-track road running north from 1100 Well to overlook of White Rock Canyon near Pinabete Tanks
- Montoso Peak Trail – 12 miles (19 km) (loop) of two-track road running west from 1100 Well around north end of Montoso Peak
- Frijoles Canyon Overlook – 2.6 miles (4.2 km) (one way) of hiking trail and two-track road running west from Montoso Peak to edge of White Rock Canyon, with descent into the canyon across from Frijoles Canyon in Bandelier National Monument
- Sagebrush Flats Trail – 17 miles (27 km) (loop) of two-track road running north from 1100 Well (or 700 Well) into the northern section of Caja above Diablo Canyon
- Soda Springs Trail – 3.1 miles (5.0 km) (one way) of hiking trail running southwest from Buckman, and climbing up to Sagebrush Flats
- Caja del Rio/Diablo Canyon Trail – 1.3 miles (2.1 km) (one way) of hiking trail running southwest from Diablo Canyon and climbing up to Sagebrush Flats
- Twin Hills Loop – 18 miles (29 km) (loop) of two-track road passing through 1200 Well, Headquarters Well
- Soda Springs Loop is a way to connect the recognized Soda Springs Trail with the Diablo Canyon ascent trail, which is not recognized but is being improved by local hikers, cyclists, and rock climbers. Usually better done as a CCW loop, one parks at Buckman Water Diversion Station by the Rio Grande, walks or rides South down White Rock Canyon on the old Soda Springs road (TR306), then ascends the 900' scarp of the Caja plateau, also on TR306, then takes two-track forest roads (FR24J) East across Sagebrush Flats to a marked trail at the bottom of the first arroyo crossing ~1.5 miles (2.4 km) East of the ascent, then proceeds North on this white post marked trail to the edge of the Diablo Canyon, where an old Spanish stock trail descends back to the desert floor, and then follow the wide and sandy Arroyo 1.5 miles (2.4 km) West and back to your cars. The route is now under continual improvement by users, and the Diablo descent is ready for aggressive off-road cyclists, while it is Moderate Off-Trail for hikers. The rest is on old roads or improved trail, granting the entire loop a ModeratePlus designation.

=== Rio Grande Trail ===
The proposed Rio Grande Trail, if it extends north of Bernalillo, may pass along the base of Caja del Rio.

== See also ==
- Bandelier National Monument
- Cochiti Dam
- Kasha-Katuwe Tent Rocks National Monument
- Los Alamos County, New Mexico
- Pajarito Plateau
- Rio Grande Rift
- San Ildefonso Pueblo
- Santa Fe County, New Mexico

== Bibliography ==
- Brayer, Herbert Oliver (1979). Pueblo Indian Land Grants of the "Rio Abajo," New Mexico. Ayer Publishing. pp. 118–120. ISBN 0-405-11320-X.
- Allred, Kelly W. (1997). A Field Guide to the Grasses of New Mexico (2d Ed.). Las Cruces: New Mexico State University.
- Carter, Jack L. (1997). Trees and Shrubs of New Mexico. Mimbres Publishing.
- Degenhardt, William G.; et al. (1996). Amphibians and Reptiles of New Mexico. Albuquerque: University of New Mexico Press.
- Dick-Peddie, William A. (2000). New Mexico Vegetation Past, Present, and Future. Albuquerque: University of New Mexico Press.
- Findley, James S. (1987). The Natural History of New Mexico Mammals. Albuquerque: University of New Mexico Press.
- Hawley, JW (1978). Guidebook to Rio Grande rift in New Mexico and Colorado. New Mexico Bureau of Mines and Mineral Resources. p. 55.
- Kempter, Kirt (2007). "Valles Caldera:Map and Geologic History of the Southwest's Youngest Caldera". Santa Fe: High Desert Field Guides.
- Lucero, Helen R.; Baizerman, Suzanne (1999). Chimayó weaving: the transformation of a tradition (1st ed.). Albuquerque: University of New Mexico Press. ISBN 9780826319760. OCLC 955185451.
- Monroe, Deirdre C (2006). Caja del Rio, Equestrian, Riding and Hiking Trails. Los Alamos: Otowi Crossing Press.
- Sibley, David A. (2000). The Sibley Guide to Birds. New York: Alfred A. Knopf. ISBN 9780679451228.
- The Roads of New Mexico. Shearer Publishing. 1998. pp. 115–16.
- New Mexico Road and Recreation Atlas (3d ed.). Benchmark Maps. 1999. p. 29.
- United States Department of Agriculture, Forest Service, Santa Fe National Forest, Region 3| title=Proposed Action, Alternatives, and Preliminary Effects Analysis for 30 -Day Comment for the Caja del Rio Grazing Allotment, (2008) Project No. 25902
- United States Department of the Interior, Bureau of Land Management, Taos Field Office, City of Santa Fe Buckman Supplemental Wells Environmental Assessment (2003)
- United States Department of the Interior, Bureau of Land Management, Taos Field Office| Camel Tracs Road Rehabilitation and Fencing Project Finding of No Significant Impact and Environmental Assessment (2003) Project No.DOI-BLM-NM-F020-2010-0048-EA.
