= List of dam removals in New Mexico =

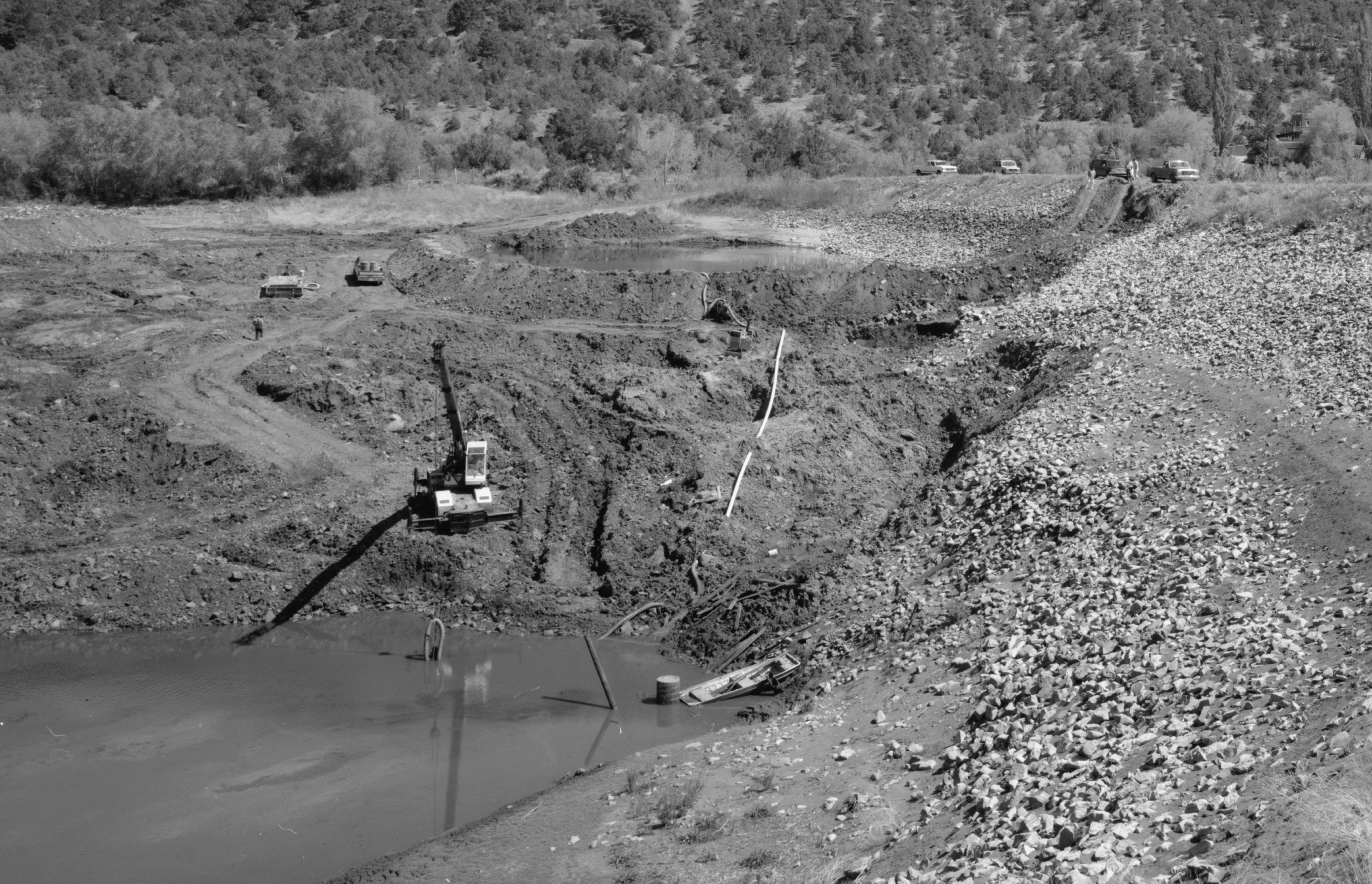
The 1994 breaching of the Two Mile Dam on the Santa Fe River

This is a list of dams in New Mexico that have been removed as physical impediments to free-flowing rivers or streams.

== Completed removals ==
Dam	Height	Year removed	Location	Watercourse	Watershed
Two Mile Dam	85 ft (26 m)	1994	Santa Fe; 35.6865°N 105.895°W	Santa Fe River	Rio Grande
McMillan Dam	65 ft (20 m)	1991	Artesia; 32.5972°N 104.3507°W	Pecos River	Pecos River
