= Red Hill, New Mexico =

Ghost town in New Mexico, United States

- Ghost town
- Location within the state of New Mexico Red Hill (the United States)
- Coordinates: 34°13′07″N 108°52′20″W
- Country: United States
- State: New Mexico
- County: Catron

Population (2000)
  - Total: 0
- Time zone: UTC-5 (Mountain (MST))
  - Summer (DST): MDT
- Area code: 575
- GNIS feature ID: 910058

Red Hill is a ghost town in Catron County, New Mexico, United States, west of Quemado.

== Red Hill volcanic field ==
Also known as the Quemado volcanic field, Red Hill is 24 kilometers east of the larger Springerville volcanic field and immediately south of the Zuni Salt Lake field. The area is made up of scoria cone and silicic dome fields The last eruption was 23,000 yrs B.P.

== Red Hill gold rumor ==
In 1836 a prospector named Adams staggered into the town of Piños Altos. With multiple arrow wounds and close to death, he told several people gathered around him that he had been prospecting off in the north. When they opened his knapsack they found a fortune in gold. His only marker to tell where the gold field was a red hill in the distance, where he described gold lying everywhere. Adams died before he could give more details, and the place he described has never been found.
