= Peridot (disambiguation) =

Peridot is a mineral.

Peridot may also refer to:

== Places ==
- Peridot, Arizona, a census-designated place
- Peridot Mesa, Arizona

== Ships ==
- HMT Peridot (FY 198), a British Second World War anti-submarine trawler that sank 15 March 1940 after striking a mine
- Peridot, a British First World War trawler scuttled by the Germans 10 July 1917
- USS Peridot (PYc-18), a United States Navy coastal patrol yacht

== Software ==
- IBM Peridot (software), an IBM project
- Peridot (franchise), a media franchise by Niantic

== Fictional characters ==
- Peridot, a character in the Japanese anime series Jewelpet
- Peridot, a character on the Cartoon Network show Steven Universe
