= Toreva block =

Type of landslide

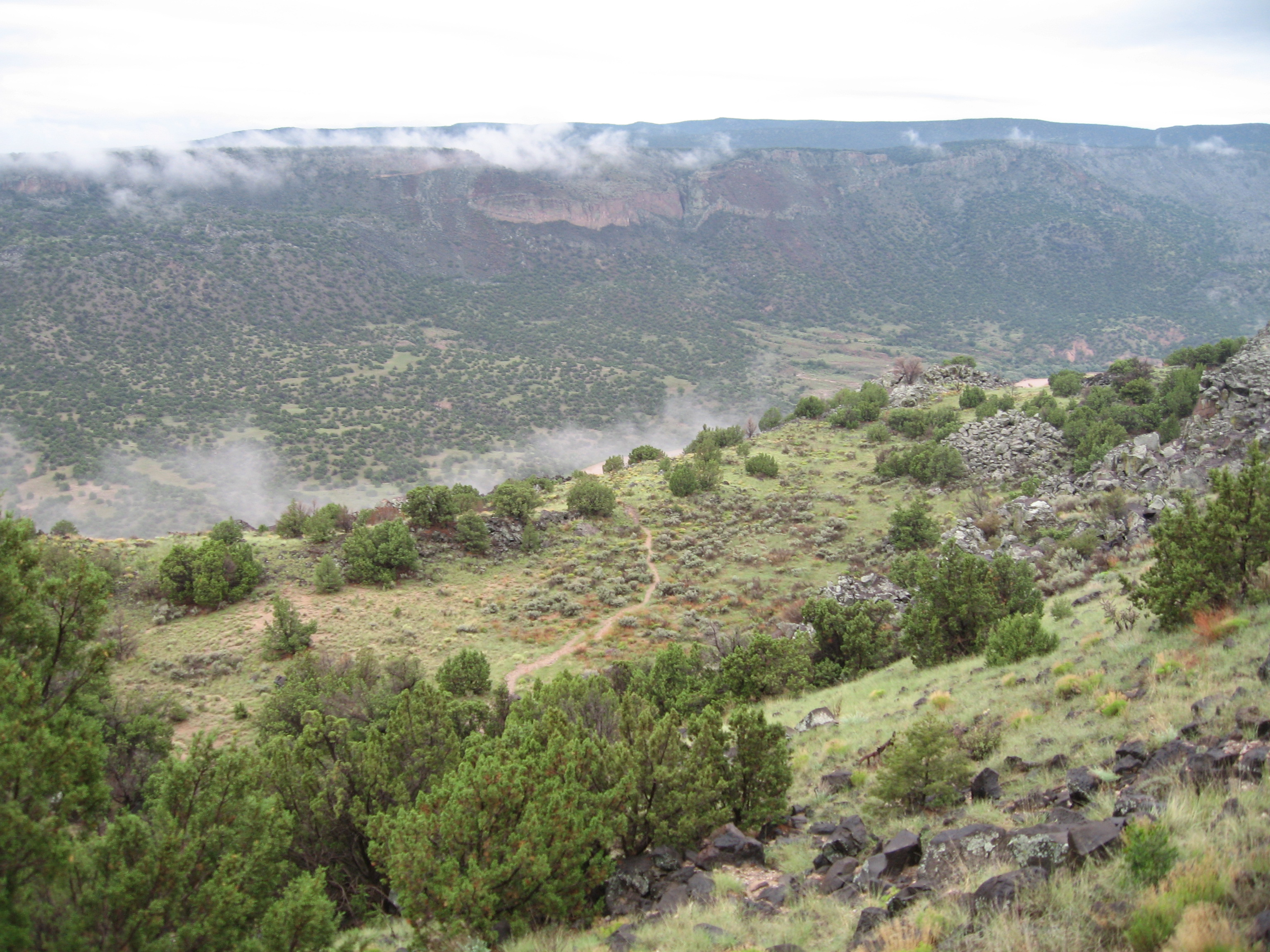
A trail cuts across a large Toreva block bench several hundred feet below the level of the parent cliff in White Rock Canyon, New Mexico, US. The weaker base is the Tesuque Formation, the stronger overburden is the Cerros del Rio basalt, and the eroding agent is the Rio Grande.

A Toreva block landslide is a distinctive landslide type which may occur when a stronger material such as sandstone or limestone overlies a weaker material such as shale and an eroding agent undercuts the weaker lower layer. The type was first recognized by Parry Reiche in 1937, and takes its name from Toreva, Arizona. Toreva blocks exhibit a characteristic backward rotation toward the parent cliff.

The existence of Toreva blocks may be used to infer a warmer or wetter earlier climate, e.g. toreva blocks in the Transantarctic Mountains.
