= White Rock, New Mexico =

- Census-designated place
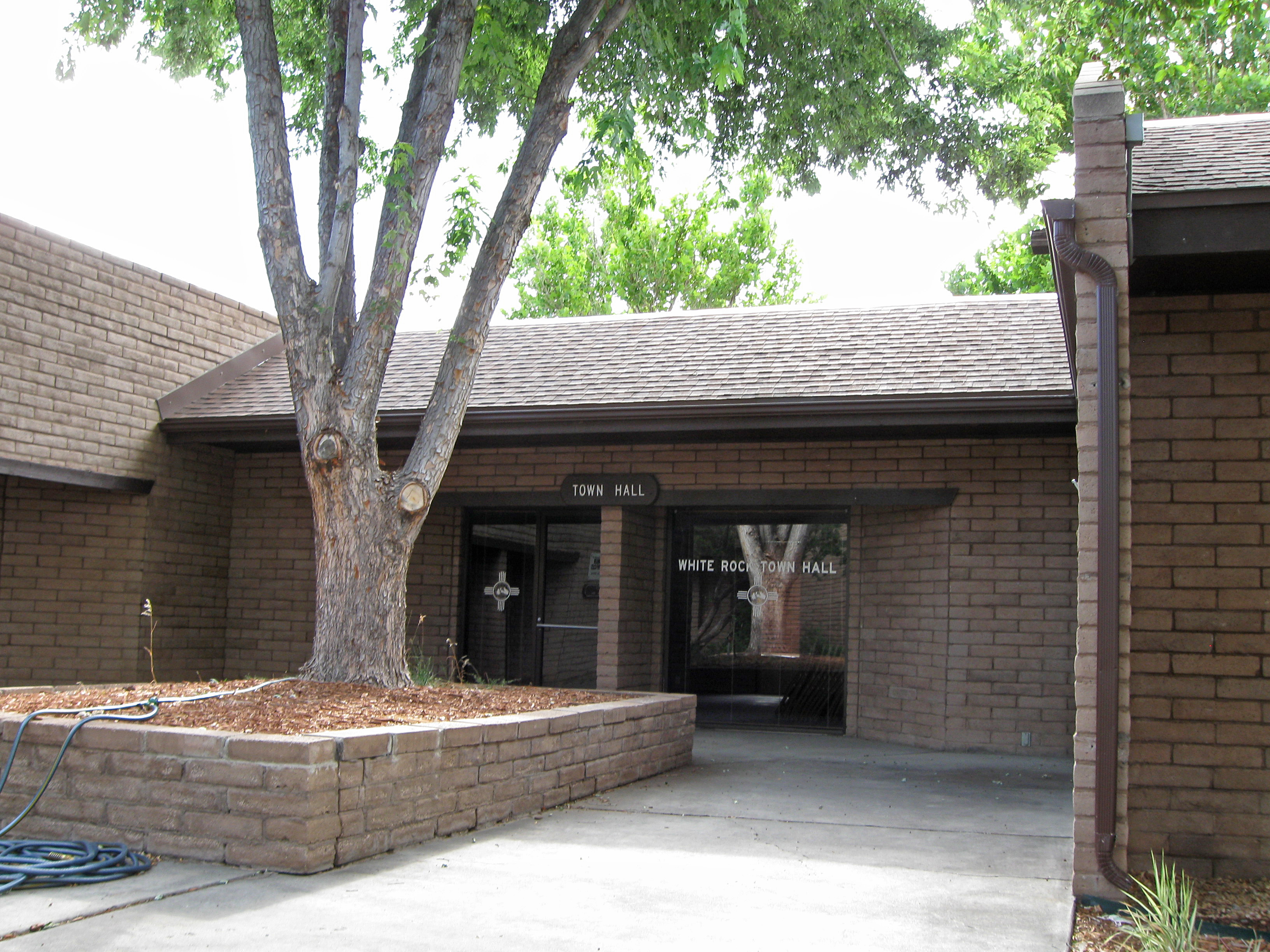
- White Rock Town Hall

- Location of White Rock, New Mexico in Los Alamos County

- Location in the United States
- Coordinates: 35°48′27″N 106°12′24″W
- Country: United States
- State: New Mexico
- County: Los Alamos

Area
  - Total: 7.11 sq mi (18.41 km^{2})
  - Land: 7.07 sq mi (18.30 km^{2})
  - Water: 0.042 sq mi (0.11 km^{2})
- Elevation: 6,375 ft (1,943 m)

Population (2020)
  - Total: 5,852
  - Density: 828.2/sq mi (319.76/km^{2})
- Time zone: UTC-7 (Mountain (MST))
  - Summer (DST): UTC-6 (MDT)
- ZIP Code: 87547
- Area code: 505
- FIPS code: 35-84740
- GNIS feature ID: 2409584

White Rock is an unincorporated community and census-designated place (CDP) in Los Alamos County, New Mexico. It is one of two major population centers in the county; the other is Los Alamos (the county seat). As of the 2020 census, White Rock had a population of 5,852. It is largely a bedroom community for employees of Los Alamos National Laboratory and their families. Access to White Rock from the town of Los Alamos and other cities and towns in New Mexico is via New Mexico State Road 4, which forms the northwestern boundary of the community. Administratively, White Rock is a neighborhood of Los Alamos; locals refer to Los Alamos (meaning not White Rock) as "the Townsite," or "the Hill". In 2024, White Rock was named "Happiest Small Town in America" by Travel and Leisure.

== History ==
In 1947 the United States Atomic Energy Commission acquired about 100 acres from the United States Forest Service to build a company town to house construction and other contractors’ workers who did not qualify to reside within the secured city of Los Alamos. The town was erected quickly from early 1949, with the intent to provide accommodation for up to 1800 residents by mid-September of that year. This was accomplished with standard building designs, many prefabricated, and included dormitories for 912 men and 32 women, 64 single-, 297 double- and 48 three-bedroom houses, all as rental properties, as well as provision for 217 mobile homes. A school, shopping center, post office and administration building were also included.

By June 1950 the population was estimated 1000 to 1200 persons, including 325 families, but from 1952 steadily dropped with the decline in major construction projects. By 1953, 251 of the prefab dwelling units had been declared surplus and disposed of, and by 1957 only 9 houses and 20 mobile home spaces were rented. The town was officially closed on September 30, and the remaining structures disposed of by the end of that year.

In early 1960 the site was offered as a housing development site to interested developers, for up to 200 houses, with purchase priority being given to people connected to LANL. Work on the second and present White Rock was begun in 1962.

== Geography ==
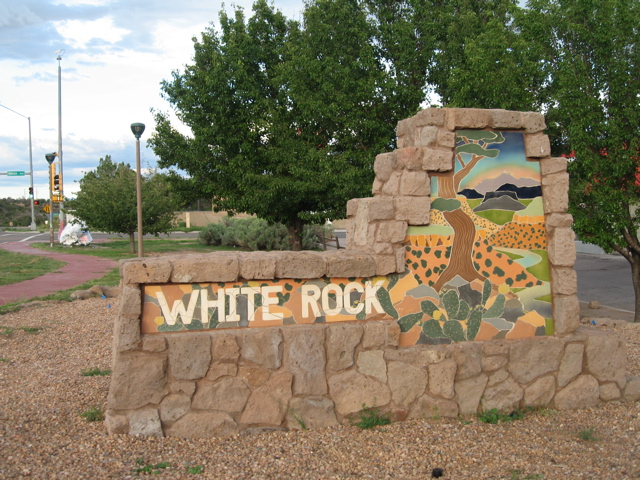
Sign at entrance to White Rock

White Rock is located in southeastern Los Alamos County and is bordered to the north and east by Santa Fe; the eastern border follows the Rio Grande through White Rock Canyon. The elevation of the White Rock townsite is 6,365 feet (1,940 m), 900 feet (270 m) above the river elevation in the canyon. The CDP includes the neighborhood of Pajarito Acres, directly south of and at the same elevation as the White Rock townsite.

The center of the town of Los Alamos is 9 miles (14 km) northwest of White Rock, via New Mexico State Roads 4 and 502. A gated entrance to Los Alamos National Laboratory is on Pajarito Road, accessed directly from White Rock.

According to the United States Census Bureau, the White Rock CDP has a total area of 7.1 square miles (18.4 km^{2}), of which 0.04 square miles (0.1 km^{2}), or 0.59%, are water.

=== White Rock Canyon ===
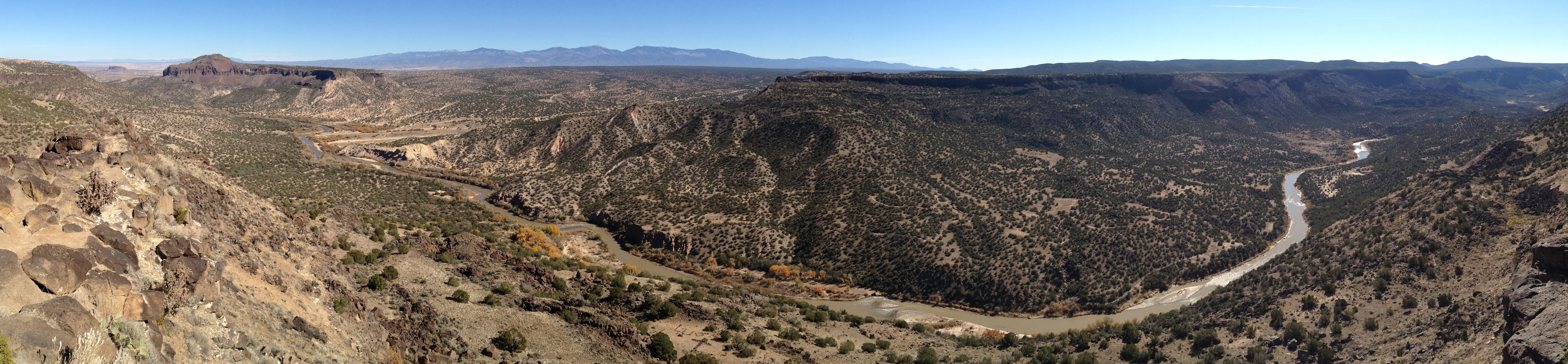
White Rock Canyon, viewed from the White Rock Overlook. The trees on the banks of the Rio Grande display their fall colors.

Largely undeveloped White Rock Canyon, on the eastern edge of the community, provides a wilderness recreation area heavily used by residents of White Rock and Santa Fe. The canyon was carved through basalt and tuff by the south-flowing Rio Grande. The canyon runs from the Otowi Suspension Bridge in the north and to Cochiti Dam in the south, with many smaller tributary canyons such Los Alamos, Mortandad, Water, Ancho, Frijoles, and Capulin Canyon. White Rock is situated on a portion of the west side of the canyon along with Bandelier National Monument, a section of Los Alamos National Laboratory, San Ildefonso Pueblo, Cochiti Pueblo, and Santa Fe National Forest. Across the river to the east rises the Caja del Rio.

For a few decades the Chili Line, a narrow gauge railroad, ran on the east bank of the river as far south as the mouth of Diablo Canyon; some day the Rio Grande Trail may occupy the abandoned right of way.

Averaging 1,000 feet (300 m) deep, the canyon provides spectacular vistas, rugged terrain and home to rare plant species as well as endangered animal species. Along the rim of the canyon are many basalt cliffs that are used by rock climbers.

==== White Rock Canyon Rim Trail ====
- Distance: 2.8 miles (4.5 km) one way
- Elevation: 6,300 to 6,400 feet (2,000 m)
- Elevation Change: 100 feet (30 m)
- Fitness Level: Easy
- Seasons: All seasons
- Trail Surface: Rocks and packed dirt
- Hazards: Cliffs, rattlesnakes

==== Blue Dot Trail ====
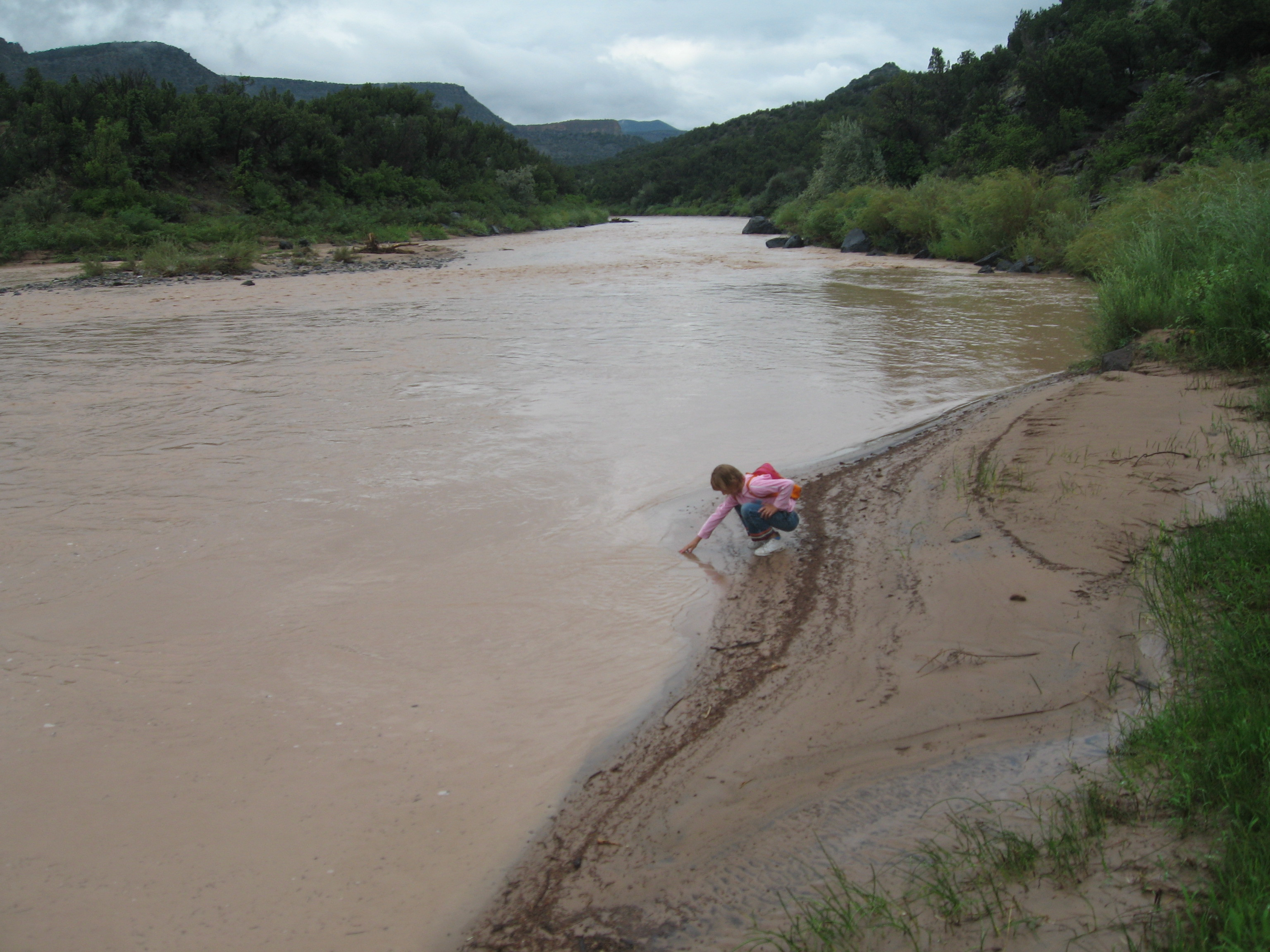
The Rio Grande at the end of the Blue Dot Trail, looking south

The trailhead begins about 100 yards southwest of the overlook viewing platform, and is accessible from a small parking lot at the end of the last side road branching east off Overlook Road. Partway to the river a meadow lies on top of a large Toreva block bench (a large piece of terrain which has moved downhill as a unit). At the midway point, the material underfoot changes from dark sharp basaltic rocks to light rounded granitic stones. The trail passes a large spring seeping from scree as the trail nears the Rio Grande. This water and water from the river are not safe to drink.

- Distance: 1.1-mile (1.8 km) one way
- Elevation: 5,450 to 6,250 feet (1,900 m)
- Elevation Change: 800 feet (240 m)
- Fitness Level: Strenuous, but short
- Seasons: All seasons, except after heavy snow
- Trail Surface: Rocky and steep trail
- Hazards: Cliffs, loose footing, swift river

==== Red Dot Trail ====
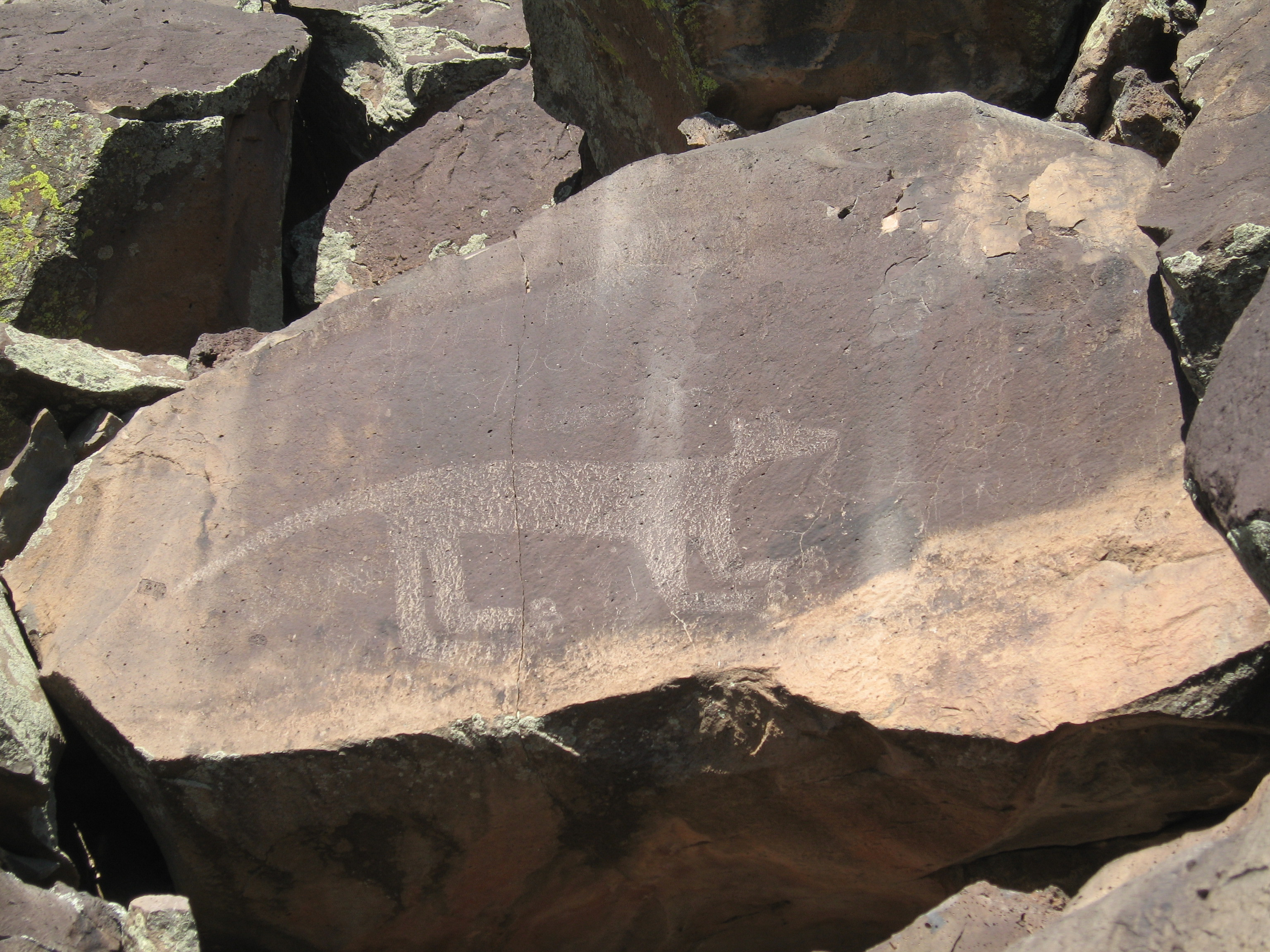
This petroglyph of a Mountain Lion appears along the upper section of the Red Dot trail.

This trail, also known as Pajarito Springs Trail, is accessible from Piedra Loop in La Senda. Numerous petroglyphs appear along the way, unseen by many hikers concentrating on their footing on this very steep and challenging trail. The rock drawings are varied in style, from Kokopelli to abstract and geometric designs. The local Tewa may have imported some designs from Native Americans of the Great Plains. The Pajarito Springs are several in number and combine to form a small creek flowing into a pool via a small waterfall. The trail continues to the Rio Grande.

- Distance: 1.0-mile (1.6 km) one way
- Elevation: 5,500 to 6,300 feet (1,900 m)
- Elevation Change: 800 feet (240 m)
- Fitness Level: Strenuous, but short
- Seasons: All seasons, except after heavy snow
- Trail Surface: Very rocky trail
- Hazards: Cliffs, loose footing, swift river

==== River Trail ====
- Distance: 3.2 miles (5.1 km) one way
- Elevation: 5,400 to 5,500 feet (1,700 m)
- Elevation Change: 100 feet (30 m)
- Fitness Level: Easy
- Skill Level: Sections of the trail require route-finding ability
- Seasons: All seasons, except after heavy snow
- Trail Surface: Sand, river cobbles and rocks
- Hazards: Swift river

== Demographics ==
Historical population
Census	Pop.	Note	%±
2020	5,852		—
U.S. Decennial Census

=== 2020 census ===
As of the 2020 census, White Rock had a population of 5,852, with 2,322 households and 1,748 families. The population density was 828.2 inhabitants per square mile (319.8/km^{2}). There were 2,409 housing units at an average density of 340.9 per square mile (131.6/km^{2}).

The median age was 46.5 years. 21.9% of residents were under the age of 18, 5.6% were from 18 to 24, 21.1% were from 25 to 44, 29.6% were from 45 to 64, and 21.8% were 65 years of age or older. For every 100 females there were 102.4 males, and for every 100 females age 18 and over there were 99.1 males. 88.3% of residents lived in urban areas, while 11.7% lived in rural areas.

Of the 2,322 households, 30.1% had children under the age of 18 living in them. Of all households, 65.8% were married-couple households, 14.0% were households with a male householder and no spouse or partner present, and 16.2% were households with a female householder and no spouse or partner present. About 21.1% of all households were made up of individuals, and 11.0% had someone living alone who was 65 years of age or older.

There were 2,409 housing units, of which 3.6% were vacant. The homeowner vacancy rate was 0.7% and the rental vacancy rate was 7.8%.

Racial composition as of the 2020 census
Race	Number	Percent
White	4,633	79.2%
Black or African American	24	0.4%
American Indian and Alaska Native	53	0.9%
Asian	176	3.0%
Native Hawaiian and Other Pacific Islander	2	0.0%
Some other race	162	2.8%
Two or more races	802	13.7%
Hispanic or Latino (of any race)	1,014	17.3%

Non-Hispanic White residents made up 73.67% of the population.

=== Demographic estimates ===
The 2016–2020 5-year American Community Survey estimates show an average household size of 2.8 and an average family size of 3.3. The percent of those with a bachelor’s degree or higher was estimated to be 45.2% of the population.

=== Income and poverty ===
The 2016–2020 5-year American Community Survey estimates show that the median household income was $128,723 (with a margin of error of +/- $10,880) and the median family income was $146,228 (+/- $18,106). Males had a median income of $90,054 (+/- $24,391) versus $59,974 (+/- $11,185) for females. The median income for those above 16 years old was $66,250 (+/- $4,418). Approximately, 2.3% of families and 2.3% of the population were below the poverty line, including 0.8% of those under the age of 18 and 3.2% of those ages 65 or over.

=== 2000 census ===
As of the census of 2000, there were 6,045 people, 2,226 households, and 1,860 families residing in the CDP. The population density was 841.9 inhabitants per square mile (325.1/km^{2}). There were 2,282 housing units at an average density of 317.8 per square mile (122.7/km^{2}). The racial makeup of the CDP was 92.75% White, 0.25% African American, 0.53% Native American, 2.68% Asian, 0.02% Pacific Islander, 1.87% from other races, and 1.90% from two or more races. Hispanic or Latino of any race were 10.59% of the population.

There were 2,226 households, out of which 38.0% had children under the age of 18 living with them, 78.2% were married couples living together, 3.2% had a female householder with no husband present, and 16.4% were non-families. 13.8% of all households were made up of individuals, and 4.9% had someone living alone who was 65 years of age or older. The average household size was 2.71 and the average family size was 2.99.

In the CDP, the population was spread out, with 27.6% under the age of 18, 3.3% from 18 to 24, 24.1% from 25 to 44, 34.2% from 45 to 64, and 10.8% who were 65 years of age or older. The median age was 42 years. For every 100 females, there were 101.4 males. For every 100 females age 18 and over, there were 99.2 males.

The median income for a household in the CDP was $92,813, and the median income for a family was $96,716. Males had a median income of $77,216 versus $44,145 for females. The per capita income for the CDP was $36,288. About 1.1% of families and 1.3% of the population were below the poverty line, including 0.4% of those under age 18 and 3.0% of those age 65 or over.

== White Rock Master Plan ==
The commercial center of White Rock has been in decline since approximately 2008, due in part to loss of retail revenues to the Internet and to "big box" stores in nearby communities. Los Alamos County recently began a major effort to revitalize the White Rock commercial center by improving infrastructure and seeking to attract new businesses. Part of the motivation for this effort is the transfer to Los Alamos County of Department of Energy lands just north of State Road 4. The revitalization effort has emphasized community input and is presently being driven by the White Rock Master Plan Implementation Committee, with the support of the County Council.

== Community parks and tot lots ==
=== Overlook Park ===
- playground
- 1 youth baseball field (non-lighted)
- 2 youth baseball fields (lighted)
- 5 softball fields (non-lighted)
- 1 softball field (lighted)
- 4 soccer fields (non-lighted)
- 3 independent picnic areas
- 1 dog park
- 1 rc car track
- 1 area viewing platform (the overlook)

=== Piñon Park ===
- playground
- 2 full basketball courts
- 3 tennis courts
- 1 skateboard park
- Disc Golf Course

=== Rover Park ===
- playground
- 1 full basketball court
- 2 tennis courts
- 1 soccer field (non-lighted)

=== Jeffrey Tot Lot ===
- playground

=== Mountain Meadows Tot Lot ===
- playground

== Education ==
The whole county is a part of Los Alamos Public Schools. Elementary schools in White Rock:

- Piñon Elementary School
- Chamisa Elementary School

The district's middle school and comprehensive high school are Los Alamos Middle School and Los Alamos High School, respectively.
