= Santa Fe River (New Mexico) =

River in Santa Fe and Sandoval counties in New Mexico, United States

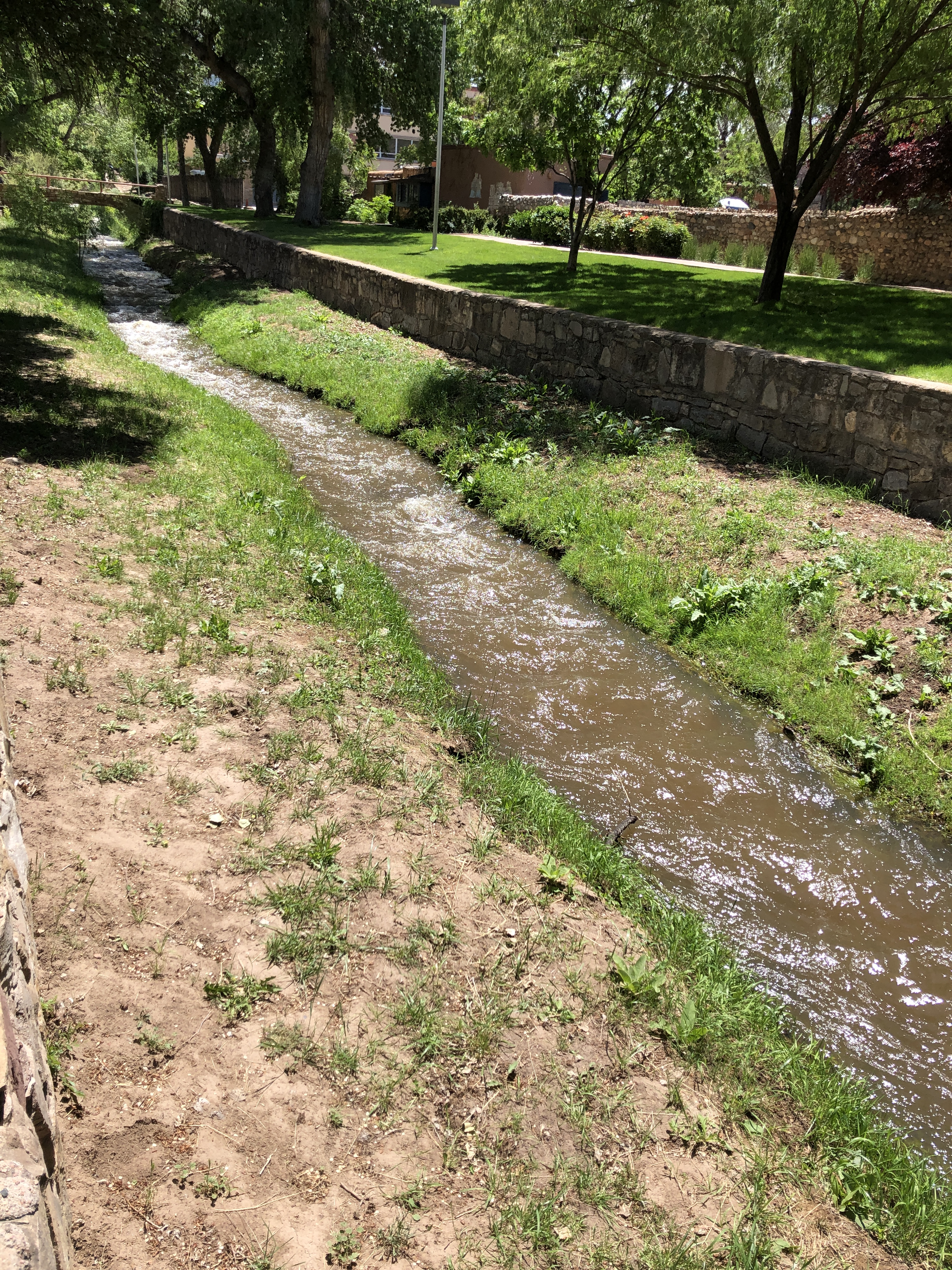
- The Santa Fe River flowing through downtown Santa Fe in June 2023

Location
- Country: United States
- State: New Mexico
- County: Santa Fe, Sandoval

Physical characteristics
- Source: Sangre de Cristo Mountains
  - coordinates: 35°47′21″N 105°46′37″W
- Mouth: Rio Grande
  - location: Peña Blanca
  - coordinates: 35°36′3″N 106°20′23″W
- Length: 46 mi (74 km)
- Basin size: 285 mi^{2} (740 km^{2})

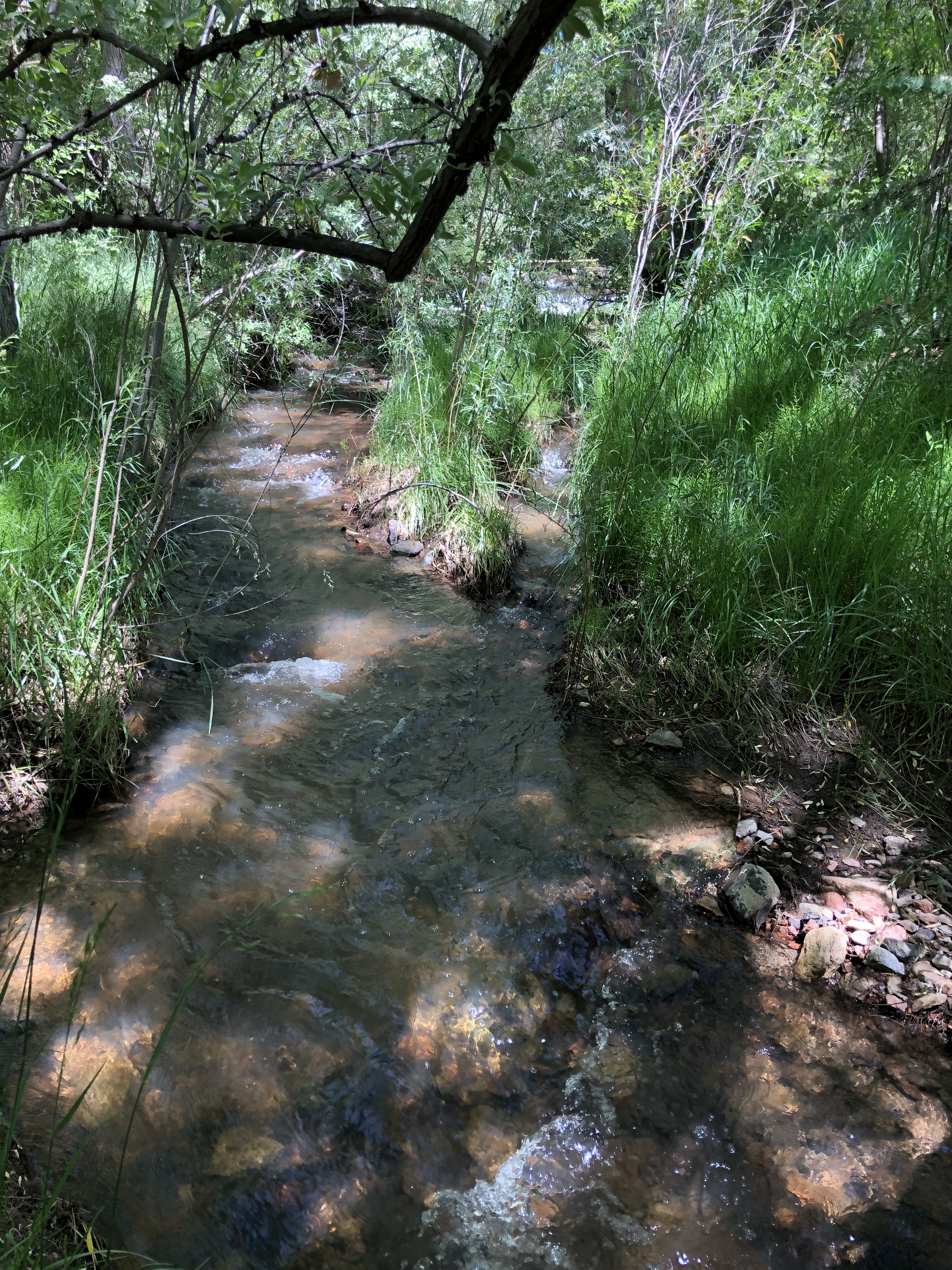
Santa Fe River riparian zone, Camino Pequeno trail area

The Santa Fe River (Tewa: Ogap’oegeˀin P’oe Húuˀu, Eastern Keres: Háshók'ọ Chéna) is a river in Santa Fe and Sandoval counties in New Mexico, United States, that is a tributary of the Rio Grande.

== Description ==
The river starts in the Sangre de Cristo mountain range and passes through the state capital, Santa Fe providing approximately 40% of the city's water supply. It is an intermittent stream with two perennial reaches.

The river is 46 miles (74 km) long. It was first dammed in 1881 and flows when water is released by the city of Santa Fe from two continuous reservoirs. The site of the 1881 dam, Two-Mile Dam, upstream of Santa Fe, is now part of the 190-acre (0.77 km^{2}) Santa Fe Canyon Preserve, a trailhead for the 20-mile (32 km) Dale Ball Foothill Trail System.

The Santa Fe River Watershed is 285 square miles (740 km^{2}), ranging in elevations between 12,408 ft (3,782 m) to 5,220 ft (1,590 m).

The environmental group American Rivers designated the Santa Fe River as America's Most Endangered River of 2007, and Santa Fe Mayor David Coss made reviving the river one of his administration's top priorities.

== History ==
Archaeological evidence shows that prior to the 1610 founding of Santa Fe, four of the local Indigenous people's pueblos were built near several perennial springs along the Santa Fe River. The source of the Rio Chiquito, a tributary of the Santa Fe River, was a productive spring located near the Santa Fe Cathedral where the Archbishop's garden is currently located. The tributary meandered along what is now Water Street to join the Santa Fe River in the area where the Santuario de Guadalupe is located. Several additional marsh areas and springs had existed in the downtown Santa Fe area forming wetlands that were "active well into the first half of the 20th century." These "ghost springs" still flood basements in numerous downtown buildings, such as the PERA Building adjacent to the State Capitol. The 1914 hydrographic survey of the river showed that there were at least 38 irrigation ditches used to water over 1,000 acres of farm land.

Prior to the mid-20th century, there are differing opinions on whether the Santa Fe River was perennial along its length. Evidence exists that the waterway was fed by several springs historically located throughout the Santa Fe Plaza area, along Agua Fria Street, Frenchy's Field, the Santa Fe Canyon zone above La Bajada hill, and La Cieneguilla.

== Santa Fe River Trail ==
As of 2007, the Santa Fe River Trail existed in short segments, within Santa Fe (city) and Santa Fe County, and the city and county developed plans to link those segments. The initial push was to develop the trail from the city downstream; this was the corridor of the historic El Camino Real de Tierra Adentro, which approached Santa Fe from downstream via the Santa Fe River Canyon below the east rim of the Caja del Rio. The paraje on the Camino Real before Santa Fe was in La Cienega, at what is now El Rancho de las Golondrinas.

In the spring of 2012 construction was completed on a new 1.3 mi section of the trail from Camino Alire west to Frenchy's Field Park. The work through this section includes extensive rehabilitation of the riverbed, significant erosion protection structures, and the addition of hundreds of cottonwood saplings and willows along the entire 1.3 mi stretch.

Further west on the county-managed stretch of the river, two orphan sections of the trail wait to be connected to the existing system. One section extends west for a mile beginning at the Community Farm at San Ysidro crossing. The other extends north and west from Agua Fria and Dominguez Lane toward the Municipal Recreation Center on Caja del Rio Rd.

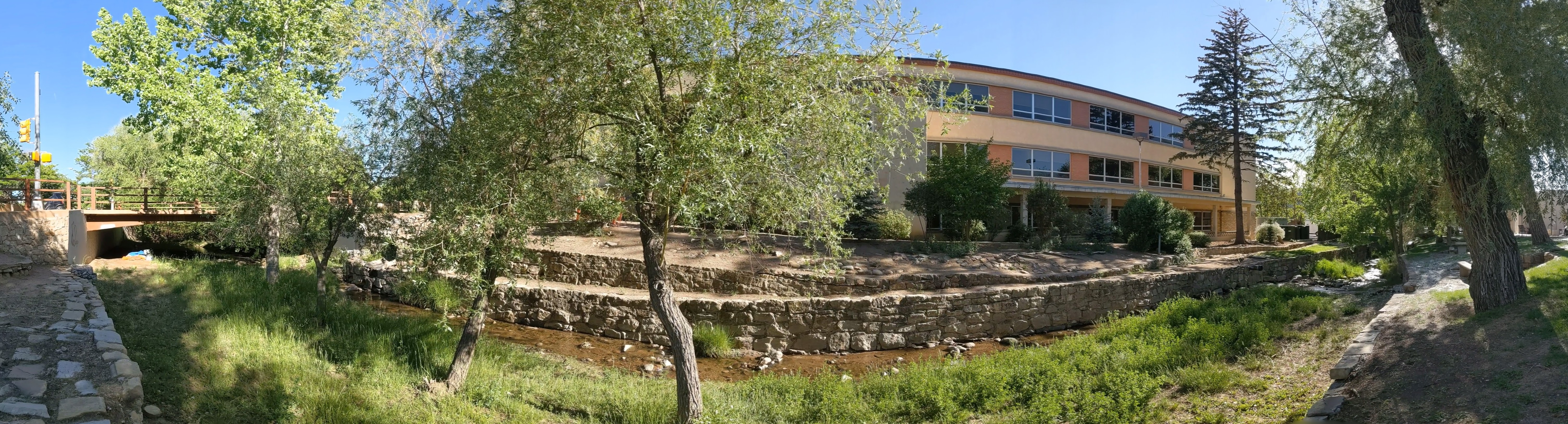
Panoramic view of the Santa Fe River, downtown Santa Fe, behind the New Mexico State Land Office. Near downtown, the river has good pedestrian pathways on both sides.

== Tributary arroyos ==
The arroyos of Santa Fe drain the Santa Fe area into the river.

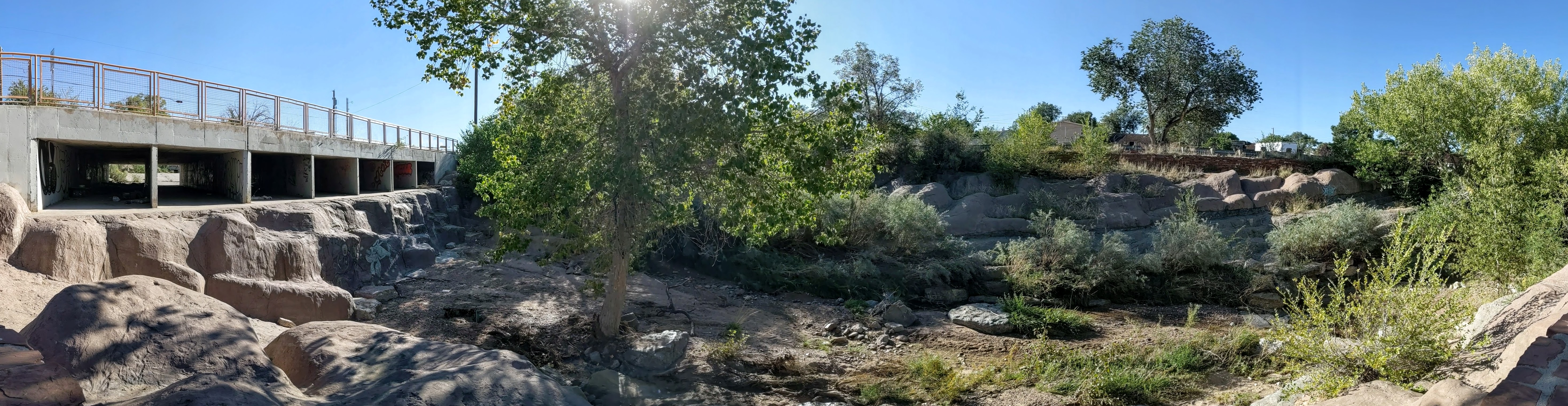
Arroyo Mascaras at its confluence with the Santa Fe River. The arroyo's box culvert under W. Alameda St. (left) just west of St. Francis Dr.

== See also ==
- Rio Grande Trail
- List of New Mexico rivers
- List of tributaries of the Rio Grande

== Notes ==
- American Rivers 2007 Report
