= Rio Grande Valley State Park =

Protected area in New Mexico, United States

Coordinates: 35.079°N 106.670°W

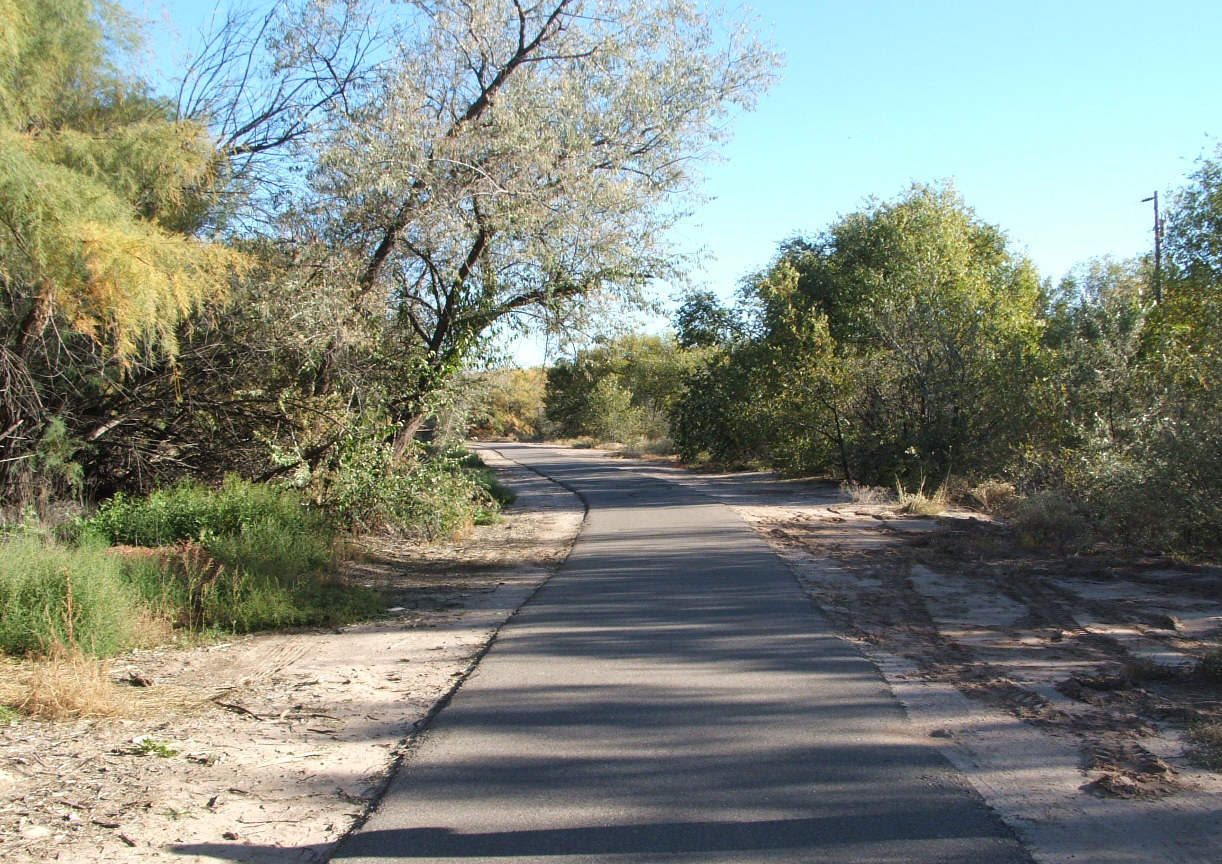
The Paseo del Bosque Trail

The Rio Grande Valley State Park (RGVSP) is a park located in Albuquerque, New Mexico, established in 1983. Although officially named "State Park" this open space is actually managed by various local, state and federal agencies, as well as other organizations.

== Geography ==
The Rio Grande Valley State Park is made up of 4,300 acres (17 km^{2}) of land along both sides of the Rio Grande stretching from the Sandia Pueblo in the north, and south to the Isleta Pueblo. The bosque, or woods, (the local name for the floodplain cottonwood ecosystem) dominates the river valley area.

== Recreation ==
The RGVSP is an area used for public recreation and includes sandy, forested trails, the paved Paseo del Bosque Multi-use Trail and constructed ponds and wetlands within and adjacent to the forest. There are several access points throughout the Albuquerque and surrounding area which offer parking, designated picnic areas, vault toilets, and trash receptacles. People may enjoy the park on foot, by bicycle (non-motorized), or on horseback. Dogs on leash, under direct control of their owners are permitted: please clean up after your pet to protect the health of the ecosystem and all those who depend on it and enjoy it daily.

Several agencies manage sites within and adjacent to the park that provide engagement with the local ecosystem and its resident plants and animals (paths with signage displaying interpretive photos, illustrations, and text and visitors' centers which offer hands-on exhibits and activities, such as guided nature and bird walks, lectures, workshops and festivals).

== Trail system ==
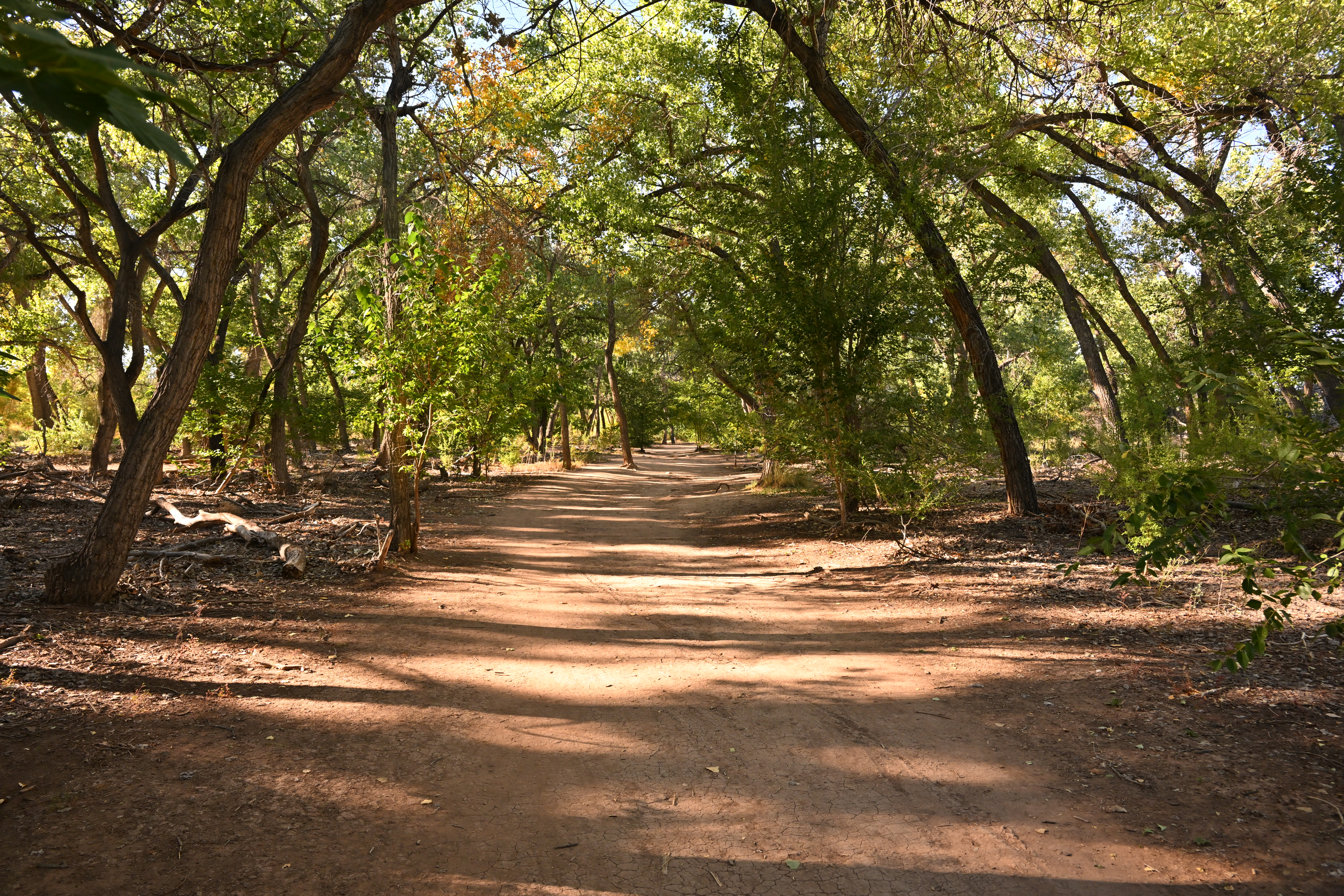
Rio Grande River Trail, Albuquerque, NM

The Paseo del Bosque Trail is a 16 mile paved pedestrian/bicycle/equestrian trail parallel to the Rio Grande. Constructed in the 1970s, it runs between the north and south edges of the metro area of Albuquerque, in the bosque on the east side of the river, and connects several picnic areas, the Rio Grande Valley State Park, the Rio Grande Nature Center State Park, the Albuquerque Biological Park, and the National Hispanic Cultural Center. The trail has been named one of the "best bike trails in the West" by Sunset Magazine. It is also a popular equestrian trail, with trailhead parking adequate for horse trailers. In the North Valley, on the west side of the connecting Los Ranchos open space just north of Paseo del Norte, is a feed store, a rare welcome for through-travelers on horseback.

The main trail is paved, and in the Corrales Bosque segment there is a parallel ditchbank dirt trail, these two trails connected by many short cross trails. Some bicycle riders like to ride very fast here, noting the fun of tight blind curves, while others note that this is not safe. Some plants here have thorns that will puncture bicycle tires and sometimes also hiking shoes. These are most abundant on side trails.

The trail is the nucleus of the proposed Rio Grande Trail.
