= Rio Grande Trail =

Proposed trail in New Mexico, United States

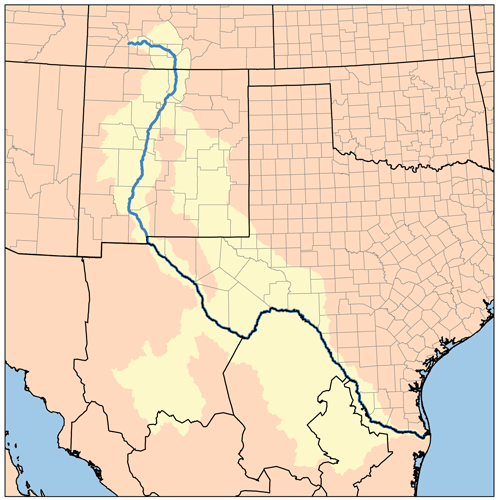
Rio Grande river and watershed map

The Rio Grande Trail is a proposed long-distance trail along the Rio Grande in the U.S. state of New Mexico. The river extends over 1,800 total miles, some 700 miles (1,100 km) of which pass through the heart of New Mexico. It is the state's primary drainage feature and most valuable natural and cultural resource. The river and its bosque provide a wide variety of recreation, including hunting, fishing, birdwatching, river rafting, hiking, biking, and horseback riding. The river also flows through or beside numerous spectacular and geologically interesting landforms, the result of extensive volcanism and erosion of the valley within the Rio Grande Rift. Although some trail advocates would like to see the trail extended the full distance through New Mexico, from the Colorado border to the United States–Mexico border, the portion proposed for initial development extends 300 miles (480 km), from Bernalillo south to Las Cruces.

== History ==
Governor Bill Richardson and New Mexico State Parks Division (NMSPD) proposed the establishment of this trail. In 2006, the New Mexico Legislature provided funding to begin planning and development of the project. In April 2015, the Rio Grande Trail bill was signed by Governor Susana Martinez, which creates a commission composed of state and local governments, activists, and local pueblos and tribes.

The core of the proposed trail is the existing Paseo del Bosque Trail in Albuquerque, a product of long-standing collaboration among numerous interest groups and agencies, including the Middle Rio Grande Conservancy District, which also maintains ditchbank trails in Corrales and other communities in the area.

In October, 2016 Las Cruces designated part of its existing recreational trail system as part of the Rio Grande Trail.

== Proposed trail corridor ==
In many locations, the basic infrastructure already exists in the form of either designated trails or informal trails. Informal trails exist on ditchbanks of local acequias and irrigation districts, on abandoned rights-of-way of old railroads, and on some publicly owned land. Most notable of these are the 16-mile (26 km) Paseo del Bosque Trail, and the abandoned right-of-way of the Chili Line of the Denver and Rio Grande Western Railroad (San Luis Valley Route). Spur trails also exist, both designated trails and informal trails as above, plus tributary arroyos.

The Paseo del Bosque Trail is the nucleus of the proposed trail. The Mid-Region Council of Governments (MRCOG), the regional planning group for Albuquerque and its surrounds, decided to extend the trail north to Bernalillo and south to Belen, about 40 miles (64 km) in all. In 2005, New Mexico State Parks committed $3 million to MRCOG to develop this plan. In 2006, NMSPD determined its next priority to be the segment from Belen south to Las Cruces. This was determined in part due to the potential for synergy with established state parks and ongoing trail development projects. For planning purposes, the 300-mile (480 km) trail corridor from Bernalillo south to Las Cruces was divided into six sections: MRCOG Bosque, Sevilleta Corridor, BLM Socorro Bosque, Camino Real Corridor, Elephant Butte Corridor, and Southern State Parks Corridor. A map of the trail corridor segments and trail progress has been made available by the NMSPD. In 2007, under the federal Recreational Trails Program, NMSPD awarded $474,698 to Elephant Butte Lake State Park for a 10.5-mile section designated as West Lakeshore Trail. Meanwhile, as community trail-development activities grew north of Bernalillo, especially in and north of the Santa Fe area, NMSPD awarded $80,000 to the Santa Fe National Forest for a developed trailhead near Santa Fe on the Caja del Rio.

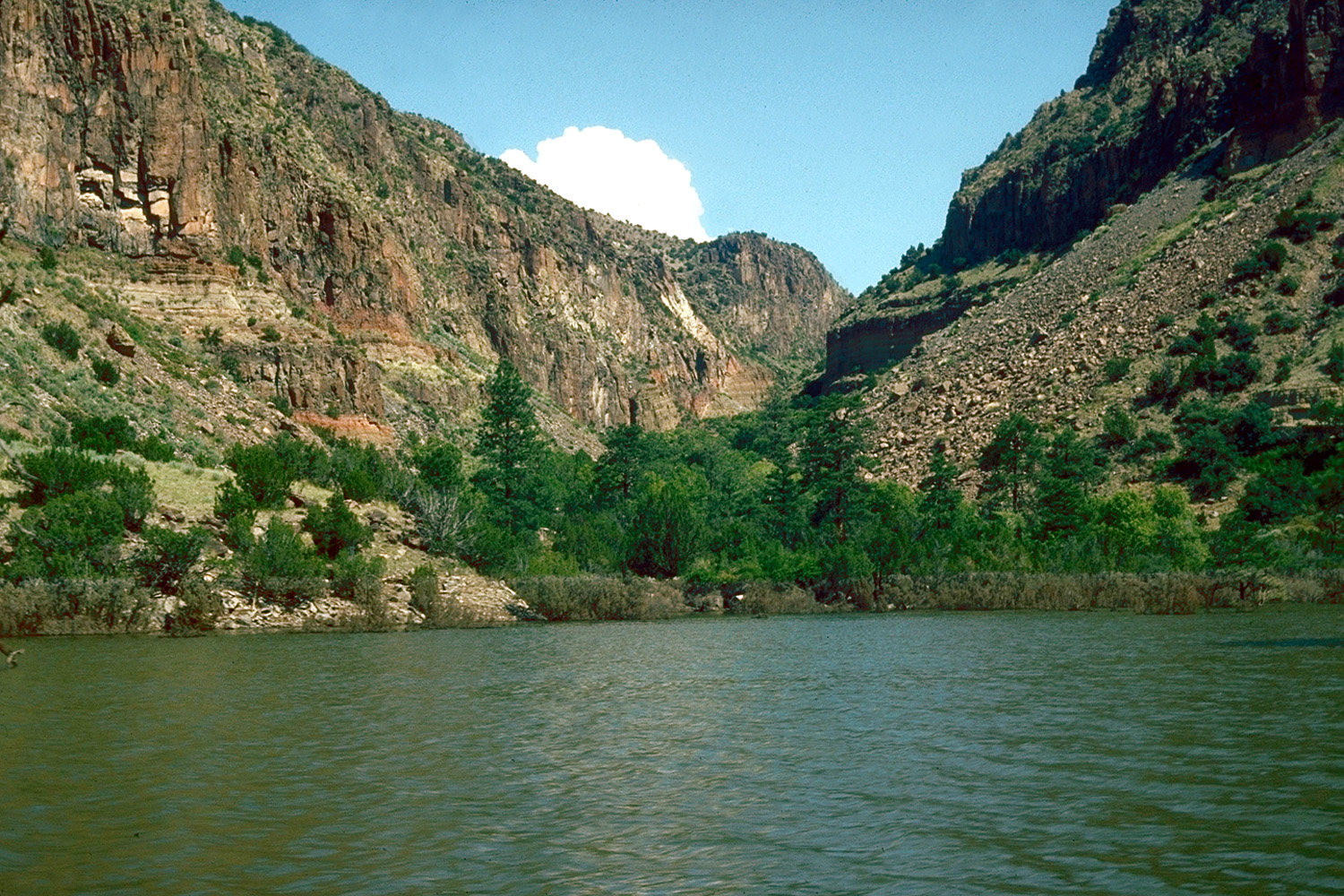
Cochiti Lake

North of Bernalillo to NM 502 (connecting Pojoaque and Los Alamos), the Rio Grande passes through several pueblos and White Rock Canyon. This presents several kinds of obstacles to trail development. In particular, the lake behind Cochiti Dam backs into White Rock Canyon.

=== List of features ===
Features of the proposed trail corridor are listed in order from north to south. Bridges across the Rio Grande (listed separately) are candidate locations for trailheads.

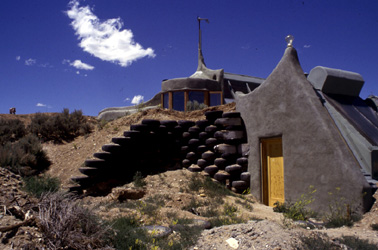
Earthship

Rio Arriba County, New Mexico

- Earthships

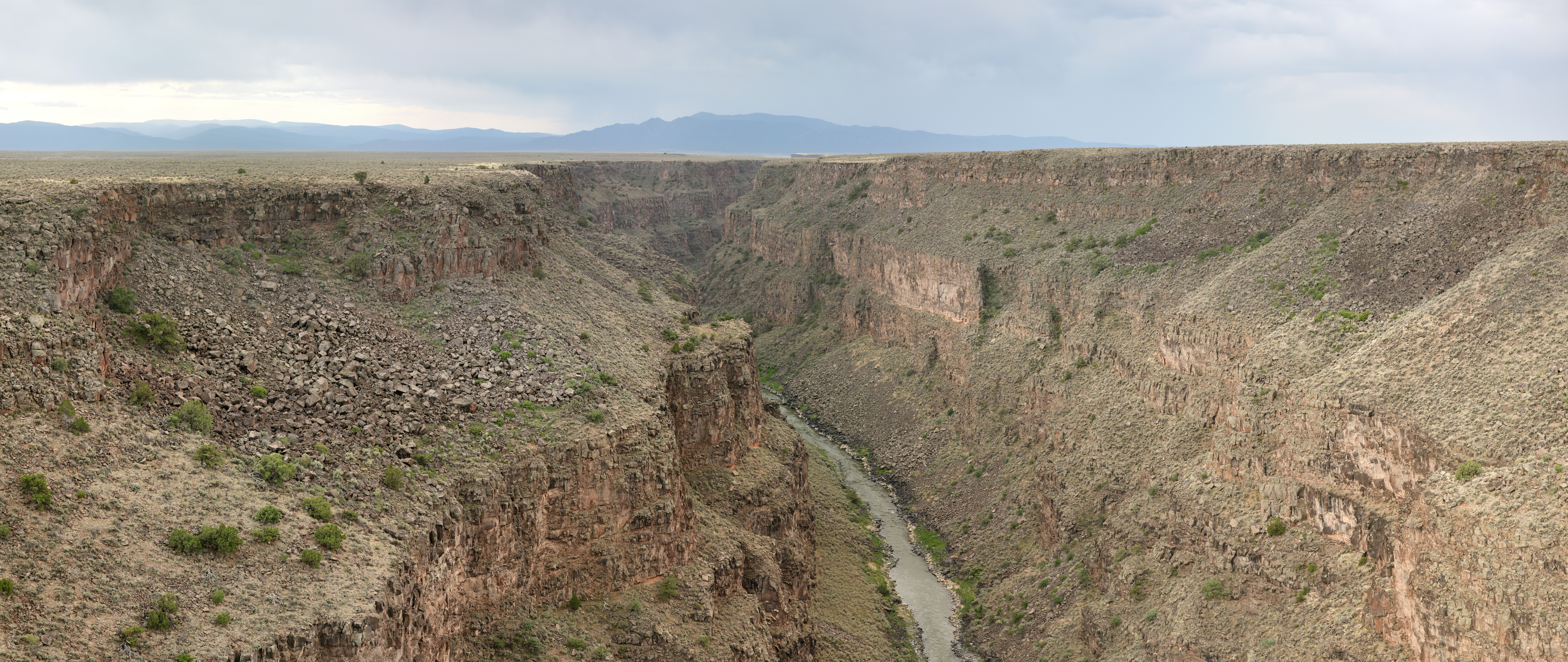
Rio Grande Gorge

- Rio Grande Gorge
- Orilla Verde Recreation Area
- Embudo Station
- Lyden, New Mexico
- Ohkay Owingeh (formerly San Juan Pueblo)
- Española, New Mexico
- Old Spanish Trail (trade route)

Santa Fe County, New Mexico

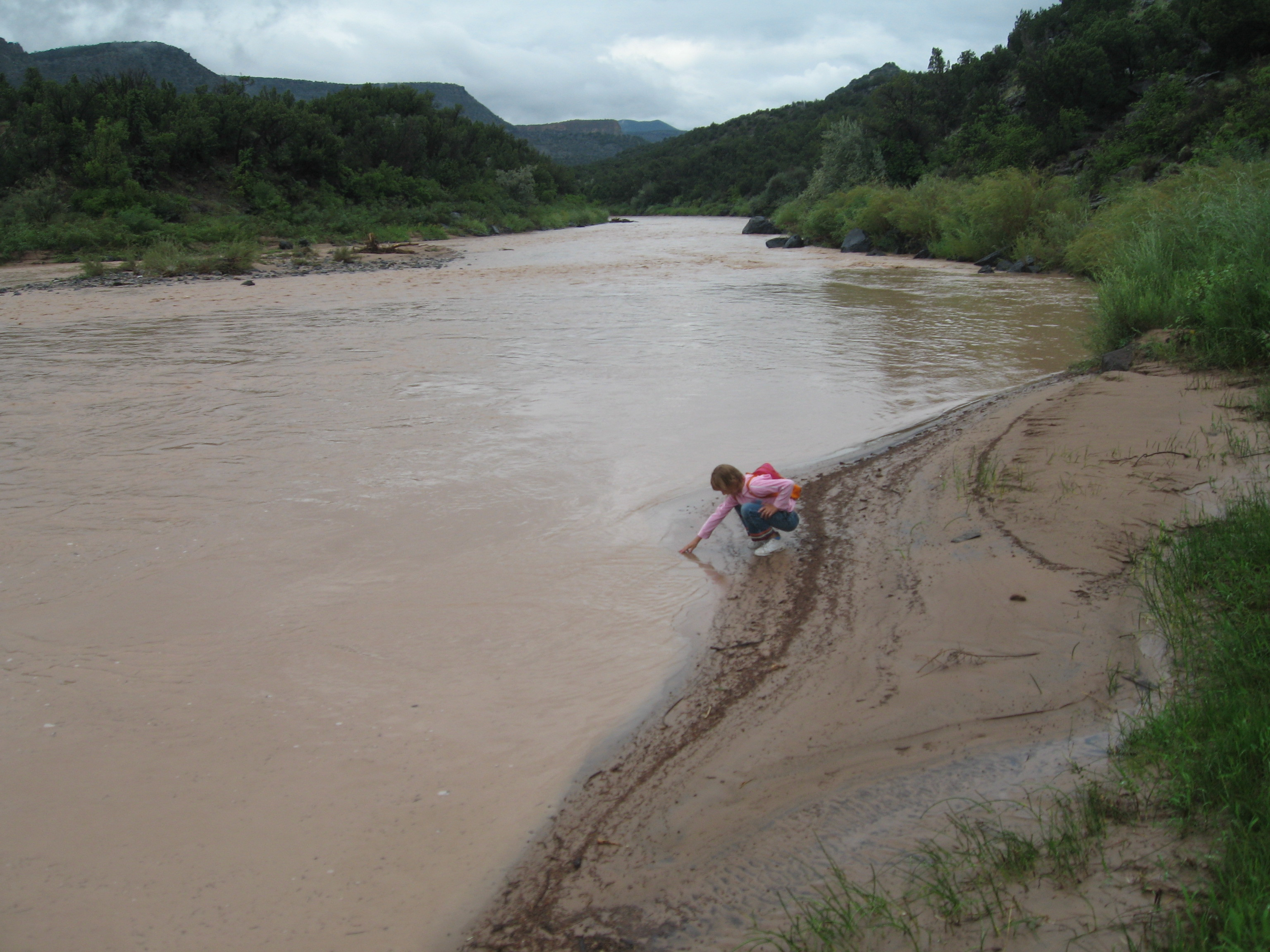
Blue Dot Trail, White Rock

- Santa Clara Pueblo
- San Ildefonso Pueblo
- Pajarito Plateau
- White Rock Canyon
- Bandelier National Monument
- Caja del Rio

Sandoval County, New Mexico

- Santo Domingo Pueblo

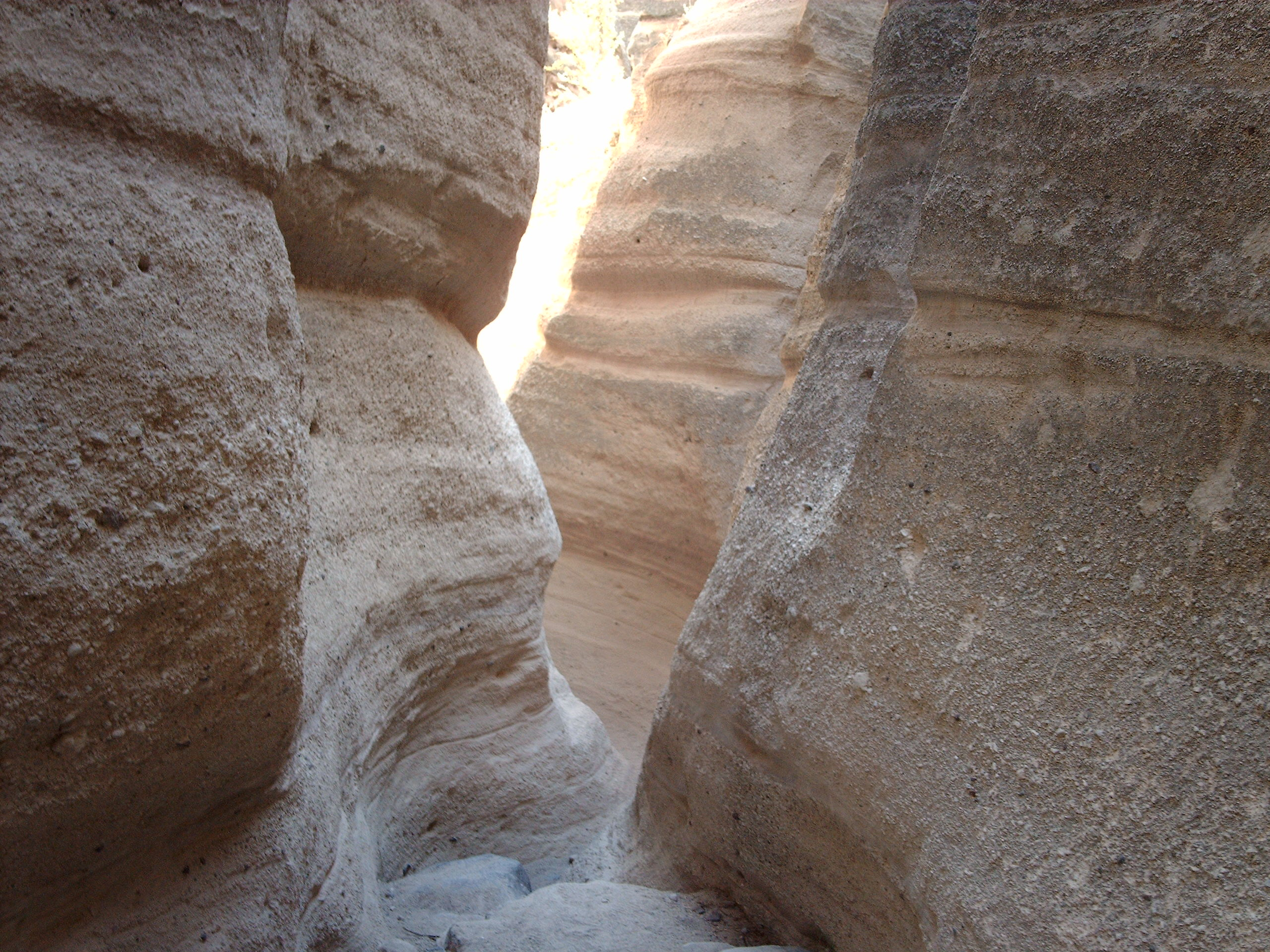
Kasha-Katuwe slot canyon trail

- Kasha-Katuwe Tent Rocks National Monument

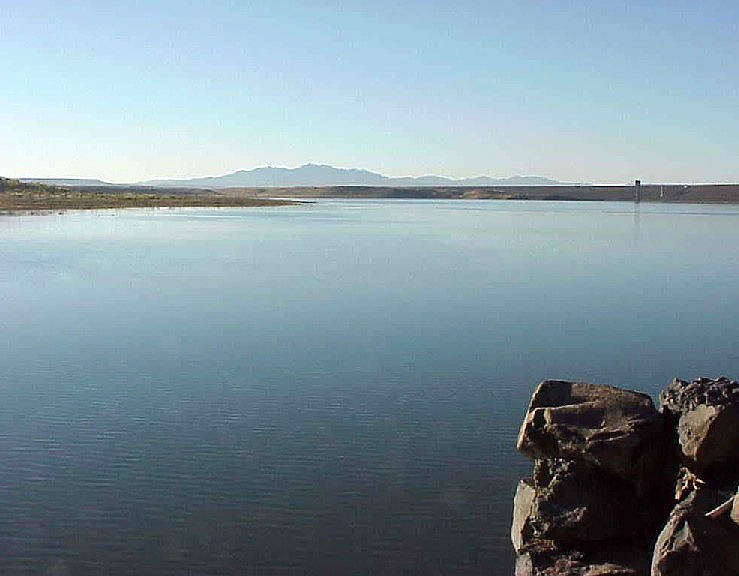
Cochiti Lake

- Cochiti Lake
- Cochiti Pueblo

Bernalillo County, New Mexico

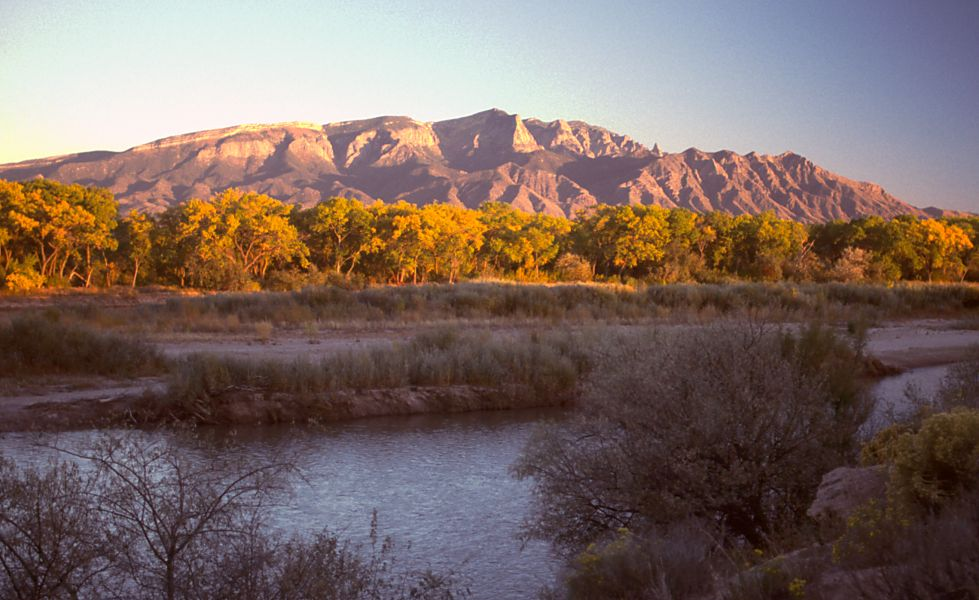
Sandia Mountains seen from Rio Rancho Bosque

- San Felipe Pueblo
- Bernalillo
- Rio Rancho Bosque
- Paseo del Bosque Trail
- Albuquerque
- Isleta Pueblo
- Los Lunas
- Belen
- Bosque
- Bernardo
- Escondida

Socorro County

- Sevilleta National Wildlife Refuge
- San Lorenzo Canyon Recreation Area
- San Antonio
- Bosque del Apache National Wildlife Refuge
- Socorro
- Trinity (nuclear test)

Sierra County

- Elephant Butte Lake
- Truth or Consequences
- Caballo Lake
- Derry and Arrey
- Salem

Doña Ana County

- Hatch
- Rincon
- Radium Springs, New Mexico
- Fort Selden
- Jornada del Muerto
- Doña Ana, New Mexico
- Las Cruces, New Mexico

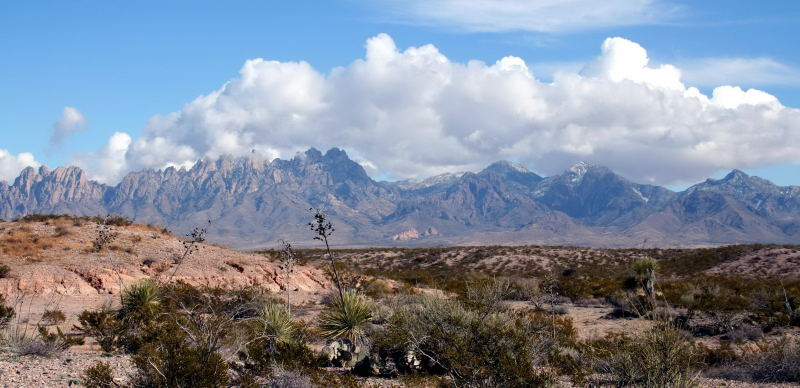
Organ Mountains

- Organ Mountains
- Mesilla Valley Bosque State Park
- Mesilla, New Mexico
- Mesquite, New Mexico
- Vado, New Mexico and La Mesa, New Mexico
- Berino, New Mexico
- Anthony, New Mexico
- Sunland Park, New Mexico and El Paso, Texas
- Potrillo volcanic field
- United States–Mexico border

== See also ==
- El Camino Real de Tierra Adentro
- Santa Fe River Trail
- Santa Fe Trail
- Grand Enchantment Trail
