= Jemez Lineament =

Chain of volcanic fields in Arizona and New Mexico in the United States

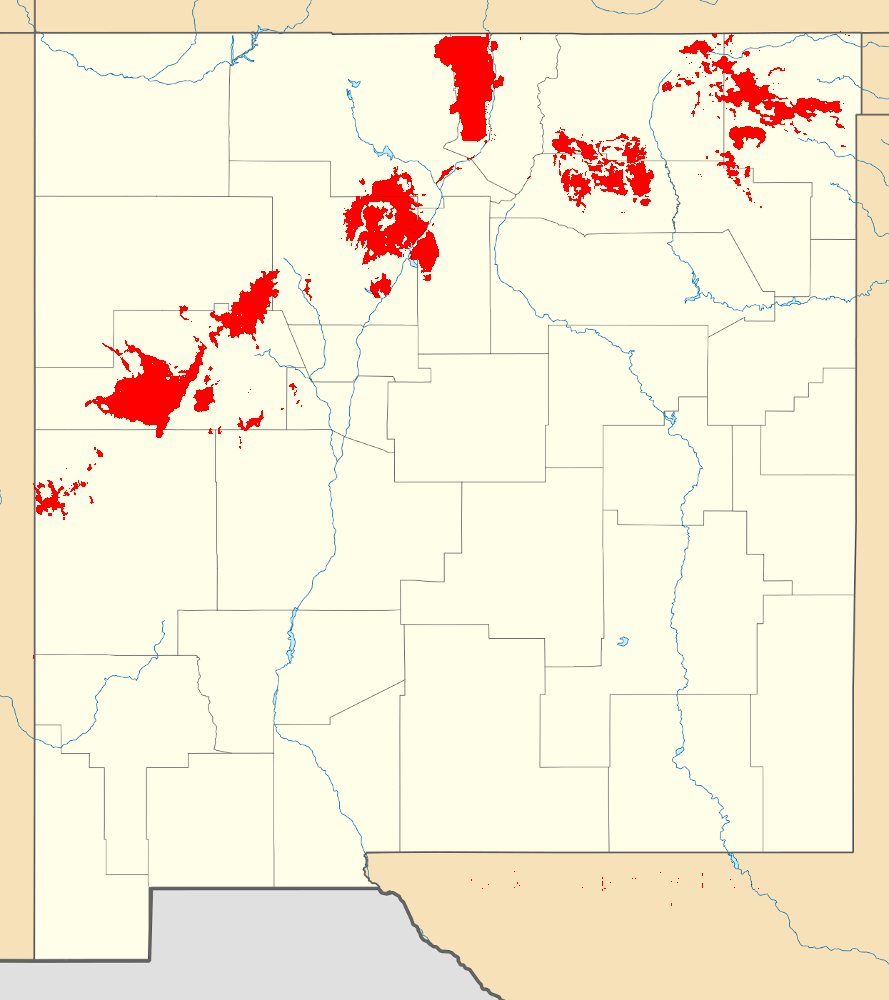
Map of geologically young volcanic fields along the Jemez Lineament

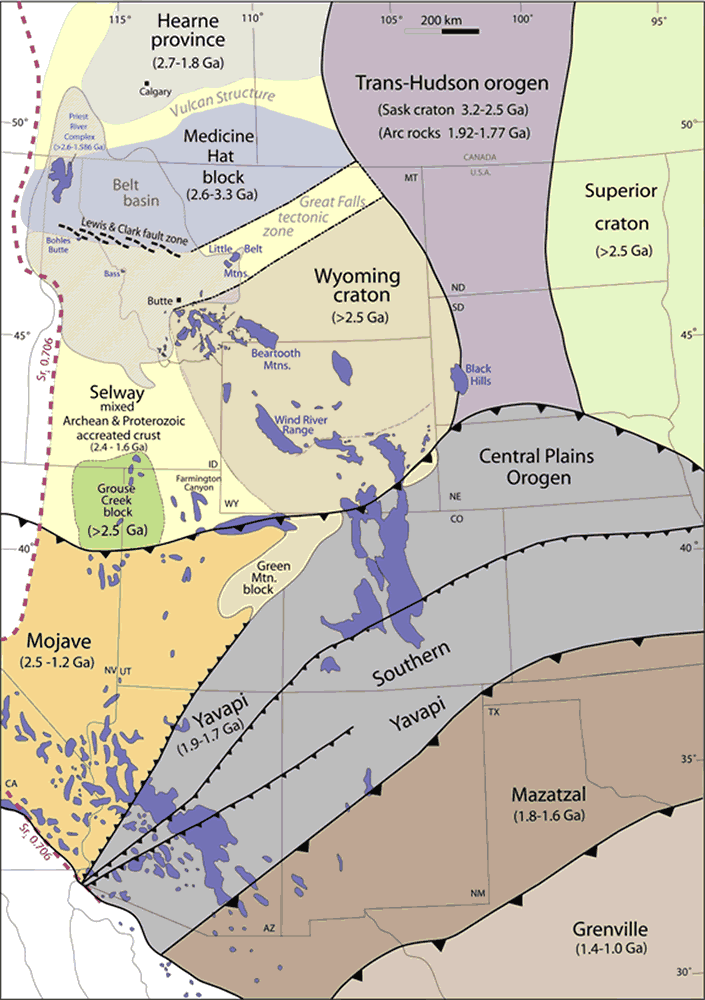
Precambrian provinces of western North America. The Jemez Lineament is coincident with the Yavapai-Mazatzal boundary.

The Jemez Lineament is a chain of late Cenozoic volcanic fields, 800 kilometers (500 mi) long, reaching from the Springerville and White Mountains volcanic fields in East-Central Arizona to the Raton-Clayton volcanic field in Northeastern New Mexico.

The lineament was long interpreted as a hotspot trace (Raton hotspot) due to its resemblance in length and direction to the Yellowstone hot spot trace, but there is no systematic progression in age along the trace and it is now interpreted as a hydrous subduction zone scar. This formed about 1.7 billion years ago, when oceanic crust was subducting under what was then the southern edge of North America. The arrival of a large island arc in the subduction zone shifted subduction further south, leaving remnants of oceanic crust at the top of the Earth's mantle along the former subduction zone. These are rich in hydrous minerals that lower the melting temperature of the rock containing them. This hydrous subduction scar now separates basement rock of the Yavapai-Mazatzal transition zone from the Mazaztl Province proper.

== Volcanic fields ==
The Jemez Lineament consists of the San Carlos volcanic field, Springerville volcanic field, Red Hill volcanic field, Zuni-Bandera volcanic field, Mount Taylor volcanic field, Jemez volcanic field and possibly the Ocate volcanic field, Raton-Clayton volcanic field, and Mesa de Maya. These are all young (Cenozoic) volcanic fields, showing some progression in age from southeast to northwest (across the Lineament) but no systematic progression in age along the Lineament.

The total surface area of volcanic products of the Jemez Lineament volcanic fields is 23,870 square kilometers (9,220 sq mi). The total erupted volume is about 3,300 cubic kilometers (790 cu mi). The Jemez volcanic field, located at the intersection of the Rio Grande Rift with the lineament, has produced three times the volume of eruption as the other fields in the lineament combined.

The trace of the lineament changes slightly across the Rio Grande rift. To the west of the rift, the lineament follows the southeastern margin of the Colorado Plateau. East of the rift, the lineament cuts across the High Plains.

The volcanism within the lineament is highly varied, including the large caldera eruptions of the Jemez volcanic field, the stratovolcanoes of Mount Taylor and Sierra Grande, and the monogenetic volcanism of most of the volcanic fields. Almost every kind of volcanic landform can be found within the lineament. The chemical compositions of the magmas are mostly alkaline to slightly alkaline, with calc-alkaline and tholeiitic magma restricted to the central part of the Lineament (Mount Taylor, Jemez, and Taos fields).

== Origin ==
The fields within the lineament vary considerably in geometry perpendicular to the trend of the lineament, showing that the lineament does not consist of a single fault or other structure. It is interpreted instead as a hydrous subduction zone scar marking the southern boundary of the pre-1700 Ma Yavapai basement. Seismic imaging shows both north- and south-dipping reflections that converge at the crust-mantle boundary. There is also a Pb-isotopic boundary coincident with the Lineament. Geophysical studies have identified a low-velocity upper mantle zone coincident with the lineament. The lineament is a zone of persistent crustal weakness.

== Economic resources ==
The Jemez Lineament was first identified by E.B. Mayo in 1958 as a guide for mineral exploration. Mineral resources along the Lineament include carbon dioxide fields at either end of the lineament, perlite, pumice, and construction materials. Gold and silver were mined from epithermal deposits in the southeastern Jemez Mountains.

The carbon dioxide fields, near the Springerville and Raton-Clayton volcanic fields, are unusual in containing a very large volume of carbon dioxide showing stable isotope ratios indicating an origin in the Earth's mantle. Geologists have puzzled over how so much carbon dioxide could be derived from the mantle. However, a volume of silica-poor magma similar to the volume of the associated volcanic fields, if initially saturated with carbon dioxide, would produce roughly the required amount of carbon dioxide if completely degassed.

Uranium deposits in the Grants, New Mexico area underlie the Mount Taylor volcanic field, but there is no clear connection.
