= La Bajada, New Mexico =

Census-designated place in Santa Fe County, New Mexico, United States

- Unincorporated community
- Location within the state of New Mexico La Bajada (the United States)
- Coordinates: 35°33′22″N 106°14′27″W
- Country: United States
- State: New Mexico
- County: Santa Fe
- Elevation: 5,496 ft (1,675 m)
- Time zone: UTC-7 (Mountain (MST))
  - Summer (DST): UTC-6 (MDT)
- ZIP codes: 87052
- Area code: 505
- GNIS feature ID: 928746

La Bajada is a census-designated place in Santa Fe County, New Mexico, United States. As of the 2020 census, La Bajada had a population of 26. It is named after a geographical feature of the nearby Caja del Rio.

== History ==
The settlement is adjacent to the site of Tsenatay, an old pueblo of Tano people.

A post office called La Bajada was established in 1870; it closed in 1872. La Bajada is derived from Spanish meaning "the descent".

== Education ==
It is within Santa Fe Public Schools.
