= Zuñi Salt Lake =

Saltwater lake in New Mexico, US

- Maʼkʼyayʼa (Zuni)
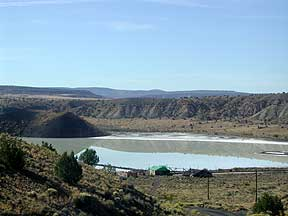
- c. 2000

- Location within New Mexico Location within the United States
- Interactive map of Zuñi Salt Lake
- Location: Catron County, New Mexico, United States
- Coordinates: 34°27.0′N 108°46.1′W
- Type: Maar
- Primary outflows: Evaporation
- Basin countries: United States
- Surface elevation: 6,224 ft (1,897 m)
- Zuni Salt Lake and Sanctuary
- U.S. National Register of Historic Places
- Nearest city: Quemado, New Mexico
- NRHP reference No.: 98000238
- Added to NRHP: 1999

Zuñi Salt Lake, also Zuni Salt Lake (Zuni: Maʼkʼyayʼa) is a rare high desert lake, and a classic maar, located in Catron County, New Mexico, United States, about 60 miles (97 km) south of the Zuni Pueblo, New Mexico.

== Description ==
Zuñi Salt Lake is extremely shallow, with a depth of only 4 feet (1.2 m) in the wet season. During the dry season, much of the water evaporates leaving behind salt flats. The lake contains brine shrimp (Artemia salina), alkali flies (Ephydra hians) and cyanobacteria (Anacystis) that are able to endure the extreme fluctuations in conditions between the wet and dry seasons.

The lake fills a maar, a kind of shallow volcanic crater formed when magma (molten rock) comes into contact with groundwater. The groundwater explodes into steam, shattering the surrounding rock and blasting particles of rock and magma into the air. The maar erupted in the Late Pleistocene, between 114 and 86 thousand years ago. The salt comes from both surface runoff into the lake and buried salt beds of the Permian Supai Formation underneath the maar. Groundwater rises through the salt beds and emerges along fractures in the volcanic conduits beneath the maar. Salt accumulates because the maar has no natural outlet.

The lake was listed on the National Register of Historic Places in 1999. It is part of the Red Hill volcanic field.

== History ==
For centuries, the Pueblo people of the Southwest, including the Zuni, Acoma, Laguna, Hopi and Taos pueblos, have made annual pilgrimages to Zuñi Salt Lake to harvest salt, for both culinary and ceremonial purposes. Ancient roadways radiate out from the lake to the various pueblos and ancient pueblo sites, such as Chaco. The lake itself is considered sacred, home of the Salt Mother deity, known to the Zuñi as Ma'l Okyattsik'i.

Salt from Zuñi Salt Lake was traded extensively within the Chaco culture, and salt grains matching those from Zuñi Salt Lake have been found in corn husk wrappings in archaeological sites in the San Juan Basin. Salt from the lake was still being traded extensively by the Zuni at the time of the first Spanish contact.

Juan de Oñate sent Captain Marcos Farfán to investigate the lake in 1598, and the captain reported that he was "certain that neither in all Christendom nor outside of it, is there anything so grand, nor has the kind anything to equal it." To later Hispanic explorers and settlers, such as Bernardo de Miera y Pacheco and José de Züñiga, the lake was known as Salinas.

Famous Apache chief Geronimo, in Geronimo's Story of His Life reported the following about the lake: "We obtained our salt from a little lake in the Gila Mountains.... When visiting this lake our people were not allowed to even kill game or attack an enemy. All creatures were free to go and come without molestation."

The Zuñi Salt Lake was not part of the Zuñi reservation originally recognized by the U.S. government, but the U.S. returned the lake itself, and 5,000 acres (2,000 ha; 20 km^{2}) surrounding it, to Zuni control in 1985.

== Controversy ==
From 1994 to 2003, there was a proposal to develop a coal mine near the Zuñi Salt Lake. It would have involved extraction of water from the aquifer below the lake as well as construction between the lake and the Pueblo of Zuñi. The proposal was withdrawn after several lawsuits, and is regarded as an important exercise of native rights in the United States.

== See also ==
- List of lakes in New Mexico
- National Register of Historic Places listings in Catron County, New Mexico
