= Peridot Mesa =

Landform in Gila and Graham counties in Arizona

Coordinates: 33°20′02″N 110°29′08″W

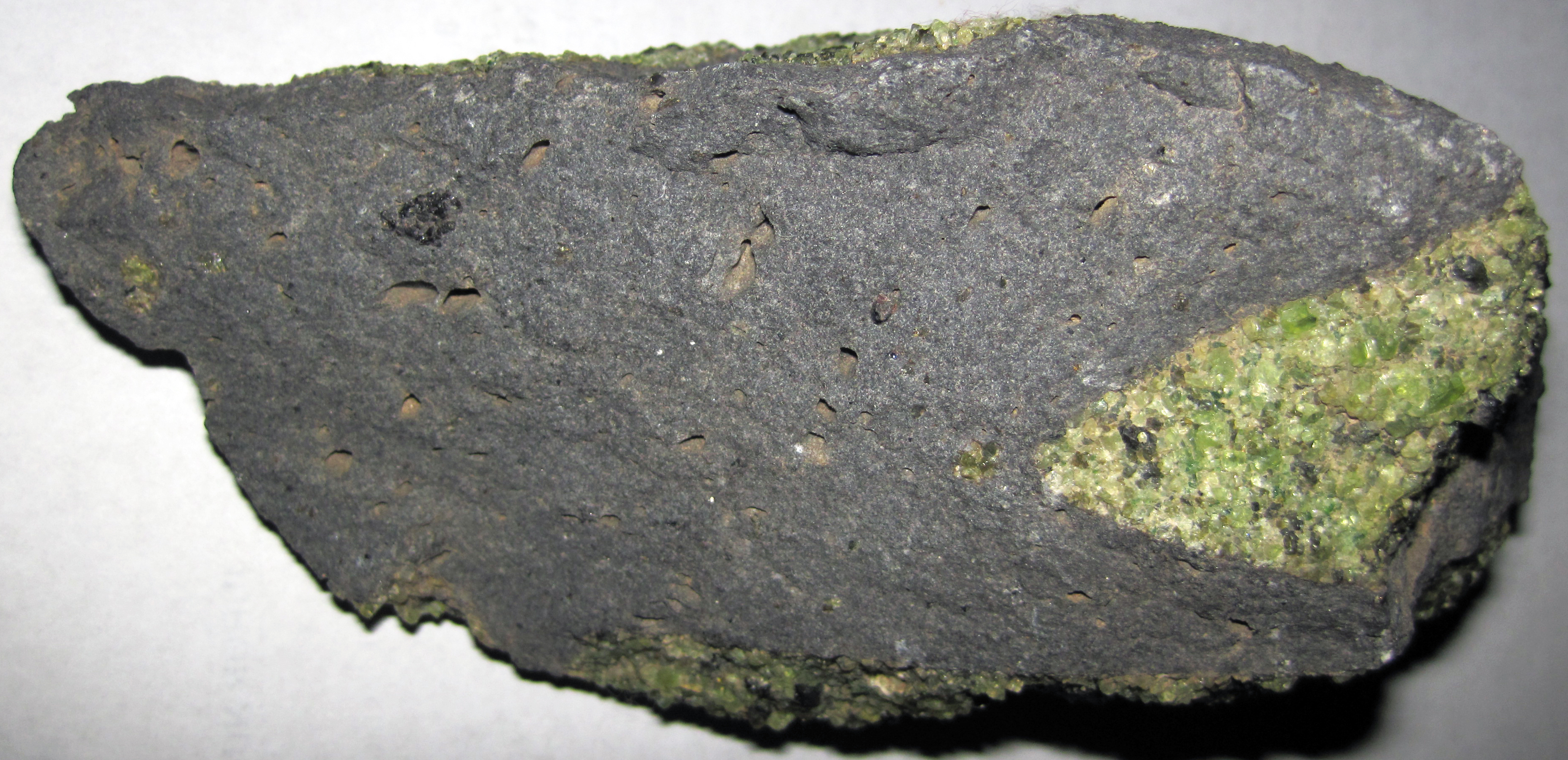
Peridotite xenoliths (green) in phonotephrite from Peridot Mesa

The Peridot Mesa vent is a part of the San Carlos volcanic field located in San Carlos, Arizona, United States on the San Carlos Apache Indian Reservation. The mesa is about 3 km (1.9 mi) in diameter and is capped by a basalt flow 3 to 6 meters thick that originated from a volcanic cone located in the Southwest corner of the mesa. The flow which surrounds this vent is of special interest to igneous petrologists due to several unique qualities including the extremely high concentration of xenoliths.

== Formation history ==
The formation of Peridot Mesa is still being studied and debated today, but several theories about the initial formation have come to be widely accepted among scientists. The initial eruption was an extremely violent, high-energy pyroclastic flow. The presence of xenoliths which reach up to basketball size and beyond suggests that the magma had to have been traveling at extremely high speeds to have been able to carry such heavy pieces up with it. Current studies are being done at Arizona State University to determine a timeline history for these xenoliths based on analysis of the reaction rims around olivine crystals.

The theory that a lava fountain created this unique flow is currently the most accepted theory. This is because the lava flow is "rootless" meaning that it begins outside of the tuff ring directly around the vent. This indicates that a lava fountain probably blasted lava away from its point of origin. The vent is best described as a diatreme, defined as a volcanic vent blasted through solid rock by exploding gases. The magma probably contained a large mass amount of water and carbon dioxide which are two volatile substances known to cause extremely high-energy and violent eruptions. The amount of volatiles in magma is directly correlated to the amount of partial melting and energy of the volcanic eruption. The flow followed topography down a depression trending to the NE carrying numerous nodules of peridotite xenoliths that had also been blasted out by vigorous fountaining. The volcanic neck of the vent is now collapsed. It is thought that the final stage of activity was marked by a cessation of fountaining, and the remaining volumes of magma hardened to create a plug in the vent.
