= San Carlos volcanic field =

Landform in Graham County, Arizona

San Carlos Volcanic Field
- Location within Arizona

Highest point
- Elevation: 1,000 m (3,300 ft)
- Coordinates: 33°15′N 110°15′W

Geography
- Location: Arizona, United States

Geology
- Rock age: Neogene
- Mountain type: Volcanic field
- Last eruption: ~ 1 million years ago

San Carlos volcanic field is a monogenetic volcanic field in the U.S. state of Arizona. The field lies within the San Carlos Apache Reservation about 40 km (25 mi) east of Globe, Arizona. It is a small field covering approximately 50 km^{2} or less of volcanic cones and lava flows. The basanite to hawaiite basaltic flows contain xenoliths of peridotite. The Peridot Mesa vent is noted for the occurrence of quantities of gem quality peridot found within lherzolite xenolith nodules.

== Notable Vents ==
Name	Elevation	Coordinates	Last eruption
Aden Crater	-	-	-
Peridot Mesa	-	33°20′02″N 110°29′08″W	-

== See also ==
- List of volcanoes in the United States
- List of volcanic fields
