= Springerville volcanic field =

Landform in Apache County, Arizona

Highest point
- Coordinates: 34°15′N 109°34′W

Geography
- Location: Arizona, United States

Geology
- Rock age: 2.1–0.3 million years
- Mountain type: Volcanic field
- Volcanic zone: Basin and Range Province

Springerville volcanic field is a monogenetic volcanic field located in east-central Arizona between Springerville and Show Low. The field consists of 405 discrete vents covering approximately 3,000 square kilometers (1,200 sq mi) and is the third-largest such field in the continental United States; only the San Francisco volcanic field and Medicine Lake volcanic field are larger. The total erupted volume is estimated at 90 cubic kilometers (22 cu mi).

The field is located towards the western end of the Jemez Lineament.

== Notable vents ==
Name	Elevation	Coordinates	Last eruption
Cerro Hueco	6,516 feet (1,986 m)	34.3161517°N 109.5548218°W	unknown
Twin Knolls	7,379 feet (2,249 m)	34.2089319°N 109.9098283°W	unknown
Wolf Mountain	8,284 feet (2,525 m)	34.1978216°N 109.7401007°W	unknown

== Economic resources ==
The St. Johns carbon dioxide reservoir is located in the northwest part of the Springerville volcanic field and has estimated reserves of 445 billion cubic meters. Effort since the mid-1990s to either extract helium from the reservoir or to ship carbon dioxide to the Permian Basin for enhanced oil recovery have not come to fruition. A more recent US Department of Energy proposal is to use carbon dioxide from the reservoir as a heat exchange fluid for extraction of geothermal energy from the volcanic field.

== See also ==
- List of volcanoes in the United States
- List of volcanic fields
