= Potrero (landform) =

Long mesa that at one end slopes upward to higher terrain

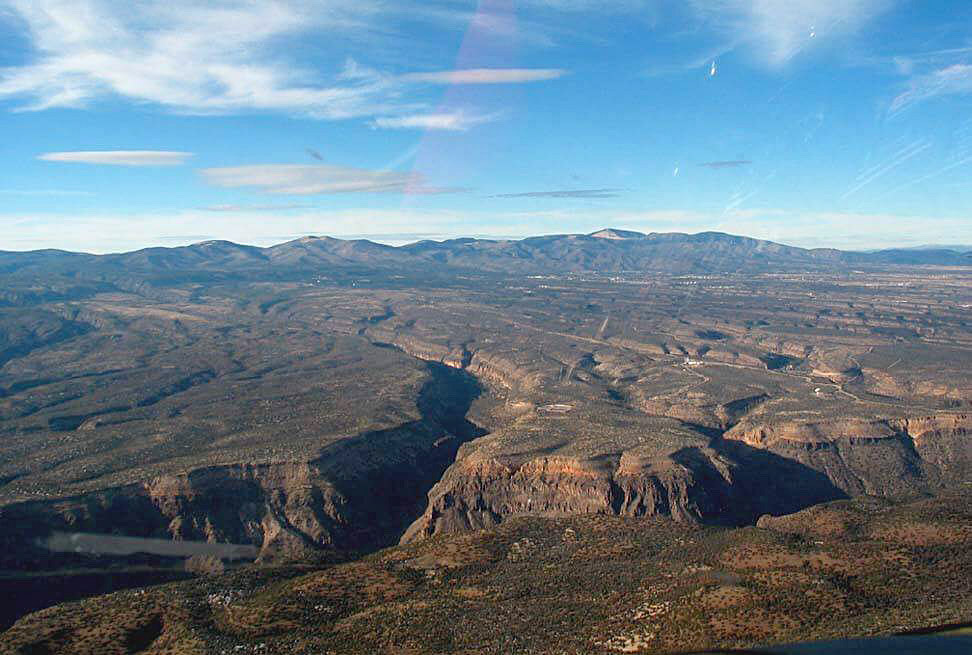
Long, fingerlike mesas characterize potreros.

A potrero is a long mesa that at one end slopes upward to higher terrain. This landform commonly occurs on the flanks of a mountain, as part of a dissected plateau.

A loan word from the Spanish language, potrero is in current use in the southwestern United States, where it is sometimes translated as "tongue of land" and "enclosed piece of pasture land". In the Spanish language, however, the "tongue of land" sense is archaic.

Also archaic is the related sense of potrero referring to someone who wrangles foals (potros in Spanish) kept as breeding stock (not saddle or pack stock). In Spanish, the usual sense of potrero now refers to any land (such as a ranch, open range, or community pasture) where such horses are kept.

Notable examples of potreros include some of the many mesas of the Pajarito Plateau near Santa Fe, New Mexico (United States).These "finger mesas" were once a continuous deposit of compressed volcanic ash (the Bandelier Tuff). Water then cut the tuff into nearly equidistant canyons. When the ancient Pueblos abandoned Chaco Canyon, some relocated to the Pajarito Plateau and carved grand dwellings directly into the soft tuff at the bases of the potreros. They also built atop the potreros and on the canyon floors. Some of these dwellings and the surrounding potreros are protected at Bandelier National Monument. Historically, these potreros were used as winter pasture for livestock (horses, sheep, and cattle) that were driven to and from lush summer pastures in the high grass valleys (valles) of the Valles Caldera. Today, these potreros are used in this manner by a large herd of elk. These potreros are natural enclosures, with only one principal exit: the narrow connection to higher land.

In Spain a potrero is common land in poor condition.

== See also ==
- Johnson Mesa
- Mesa de Maya
