= Redondo Peak =

Mountain in New Mexico, United States

Highest point
- Elevation: 11,258 ft (3,431 m) NAVD 88
- Prominence: 2,454 ft (748 m)
- Coordinates: 35°52′19″N 106°33′38″W

Geography
- Location within New Mexico
- Location: Sandoval County, New Mexico, U.S.
- Parent range: Jemez Mountains
- Topo map: USGS Redondo Peak

Geology
- Mountain type: Resurgent dome

Climbing
- Easiest route: Hike

Redondo Peak (Jemez: Wâavêmâ) is a conspicuous summit in the Jemez Mountains of New Mexico, in the southwestern United States. It is located entirely within the Valles Caldera National Preserve. It is the second highest summit in the Jemez after Chicoma Mountain. It is the most visually prominent peak in the range when viewed from the south, for example, from Albuquerque. From many other directions it is less prominent or not visible, due to its location in the center of the Valles Caldera, well away from the caldera's rim.

Redondo Peak is an example of the volcanic feature known as a resurgent dome. It was formed shortly after the caldera-forming eruption of 1.25 million years ago, but it is not itself an eruptive feature. The summit of the mountain is composed of tuff ejected by the caldera-forming eruption, rather than of subsequent volcanic ejecta. It is forested all the way to its summit.

== Cultural significance ==
Redondo Peak is sacred to various Pueblo peoples of New Mexico and, as a result, hiking and other recreational activities on the mountain are sharply restricted as of 2008. The summit area is occupied by a Jemez shrine that was studied and excavated by anthropologist William Boone Douglass in the early 20th century and remained in use well into the 20th century. According to the Jemez, the mountain is the site where the Great Eagle appeared to them during their migration from the north, instructing them to settle in the Jemez Mountains. The shrine and its immediate surroundings are closed to visitors.

== Climate ==
Climate data for Redondo Peak 35.8701 N, 106.5600 W, Elevation: 11,056 ft (3,370 m) (1991–2020 normals)
Month	Jan	Feb	Mar	Apr	May	Jun	Jul	Aug	Sep	Oct	Nov	Dec	Year
Mean daily maximum °F (°C)	33.6 (0.9)	34.2 (1.2)	39.7 (4.3)	45.4 (7.4)	54.1 (12.3)	65.8 (18.8)	67.9 (19.9)	65.4 (18.6)	60.2 (15.7)	50.7 (10.4)	40.8 (4.9)	33.5 (0.8)	49.3 (9.6)
Daily mean °F (°C)	23.0 (−5.0)	23.2 (−4.9)	28.1 (−2.2)	33.4 (0.8)	42.1 (5.6)	52.7 (11.5)	55.8 (13.2)	54.0 (12.2)	48.8 (9.3)	39.6 (4.2)	30.3 (−0.9)	23.3 (−4.8)	37.9 (3.3)
Mean daily minimum °F (°C)	12.5 (−10.8)	12.3 (−10.9)	16.6 (−8.6)	21.4 (−5.9)	30.1 (−1.1)	39.7 (4.3)	43.6 (6.4)	42.6 (5.9)	37.4 (3.0)	28.5 (−1.9)	19.8 (−6.8)	13.0 (−10.6)	26.5 (−3.1)
Average precipitation inches (mm)	2.81 (71)	2.67 (68)	2.94 (75)	2.10 (53)	1.67 (42)	0.93 (24)	3.46 (88)	3.74 (95)	2.34 (59)	2.03 (52)	2.40 (61)	2.70 (69)	29.79 (757)
Source: PRISM Climate Group
