= Bandelier Tuff =

Geologic formation in New Mexico

- Stratigraphic range: Pleistocene, 1.85–1.256 Ma
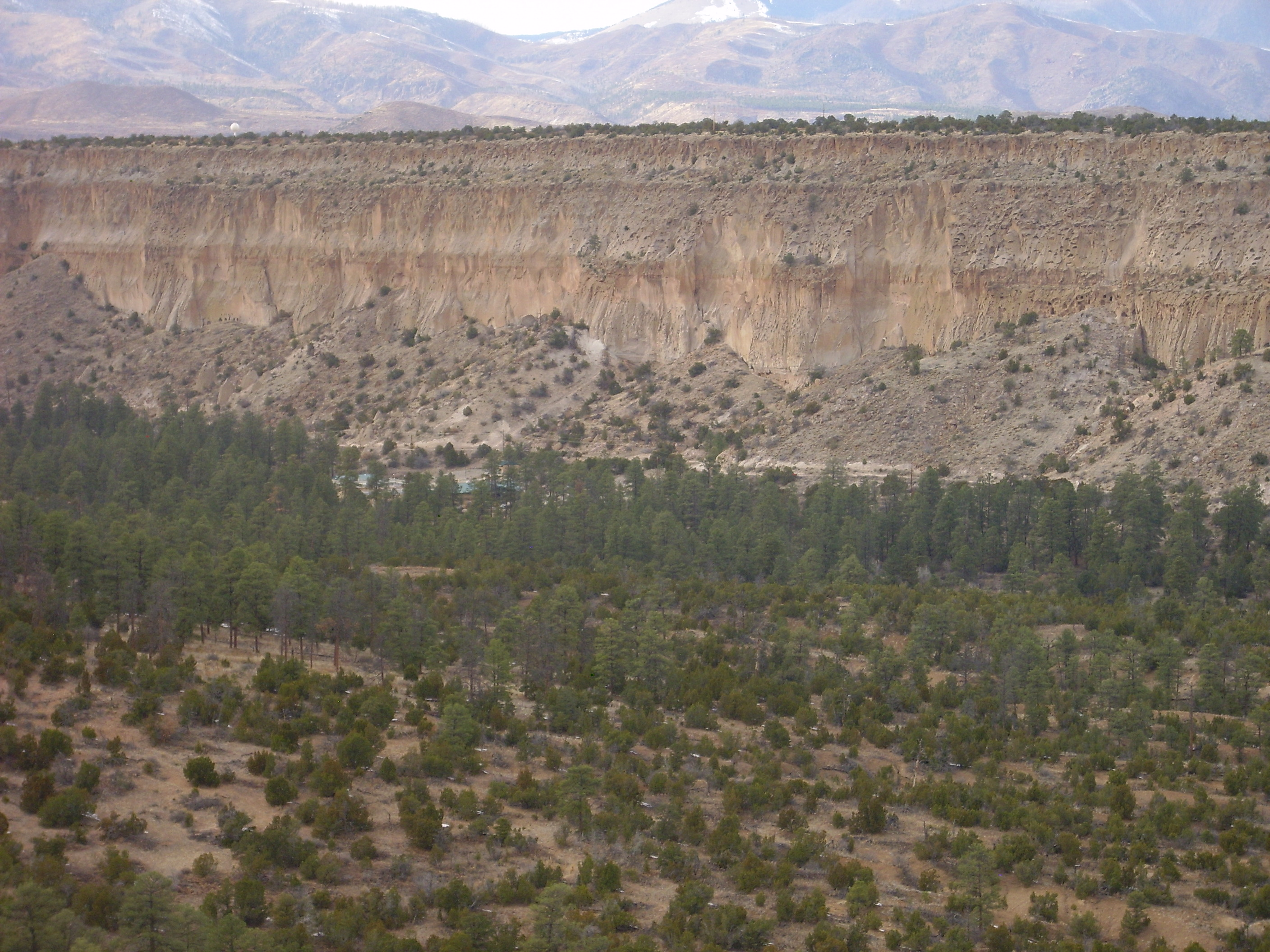
- Kwage Mesa, a typical finger mesa eroded out of the Bandelier Tuff in the Pajarito Plateau
- Type: Geologic formation
- Unit of: Tewa Group
- Sub-units: La Cueva Member, Otowi Member, Tshirege Member
- Overlies: Tschicoma Formation, Paliza Canyon Formation
- Thickness: 330 m (1,080 ft)

Lithology
- Primary: Ignimbrite
- Other: Pumice

Location
- Coordinates: 35.764°N 106.322°W
- Region: New Mexico
- Country: United States

Type section
- Named for: Bandelier National Monument
- Named by: Harold T.U. Smith
- Year defined: 1938
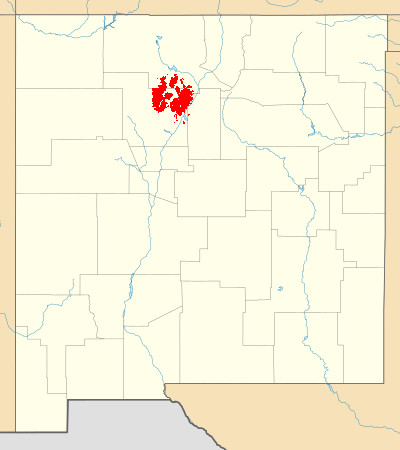
- Map of Bandelier Tuff exposures

The Bandelier Tuff is a geologic formation exposed in and around the Jemez Mountains of northern New Mexico. It has a radiometric age of 1.85 to 1.25 million years, corresponding to the Pleistocene epoch. The tuff was erupted in a series of at least three caldera eruptions in the central Jemez Mountains.

The Bandelier Tuff was one of the first ignimbrites recognized in the geologic record, and has been extensively studied by geologists seeking to understand the processes involved in volcanic supereruptions.

== Description ==
The formation is composed of ignimbrites produced by a series of at least three Quaternary caldera eruptions that culminated in the Valles Caldera eruption 1.256 million years before the present (Mya). The Valles Caldera is the type location for resurgent caldera eruptions, and the Bandelier Tuff was one of the earliest recognized ignimbrites.

The caldera lies on the intersection of the western margin of the Rio Grande Rift and the Jemez Lineament. Here magma produced from the fertile rock of an ancient subduction zone has repeatedly found its way to the surface along faults produced by rifting. This has produced a long-lived volcanic field, with the earliest eruptions beginning at least 13 million years ago and continuing almost to the present day.

Both upper members of the tuff show compositional zoning, in which the lower pyroclastic flows are more silicic and contain less mafic (magnesium- and iron-rich) minerals than the upper flows. This is interpreted as progressive eruption of a gravitationally zoned magma chamber in which volatiles are concentrated at the top of the chamber and mafic minerals have partially settled into the lower, hotter portions of the magma chamber.

The tuff contains up to 30% lithic fragments, which in the Otowi Member are estimated to have a total volume of 10 km^{3} and to be sufficient to quench welding through their cooling effect. The lithic fragments are 90% earlier volcanic rock, 10% Paleozoic sedimentary rock, and only traces of Precambrian rock, implying considerable flaring of the eruption vents. Some of the rock shows indication of contact metamorphism in the magma chamber walls with a magma rich in water and fluorine.

=== Members ===
The Bandelier Tuff consists of three members corresponding to at least three distinct caldera eruptions.

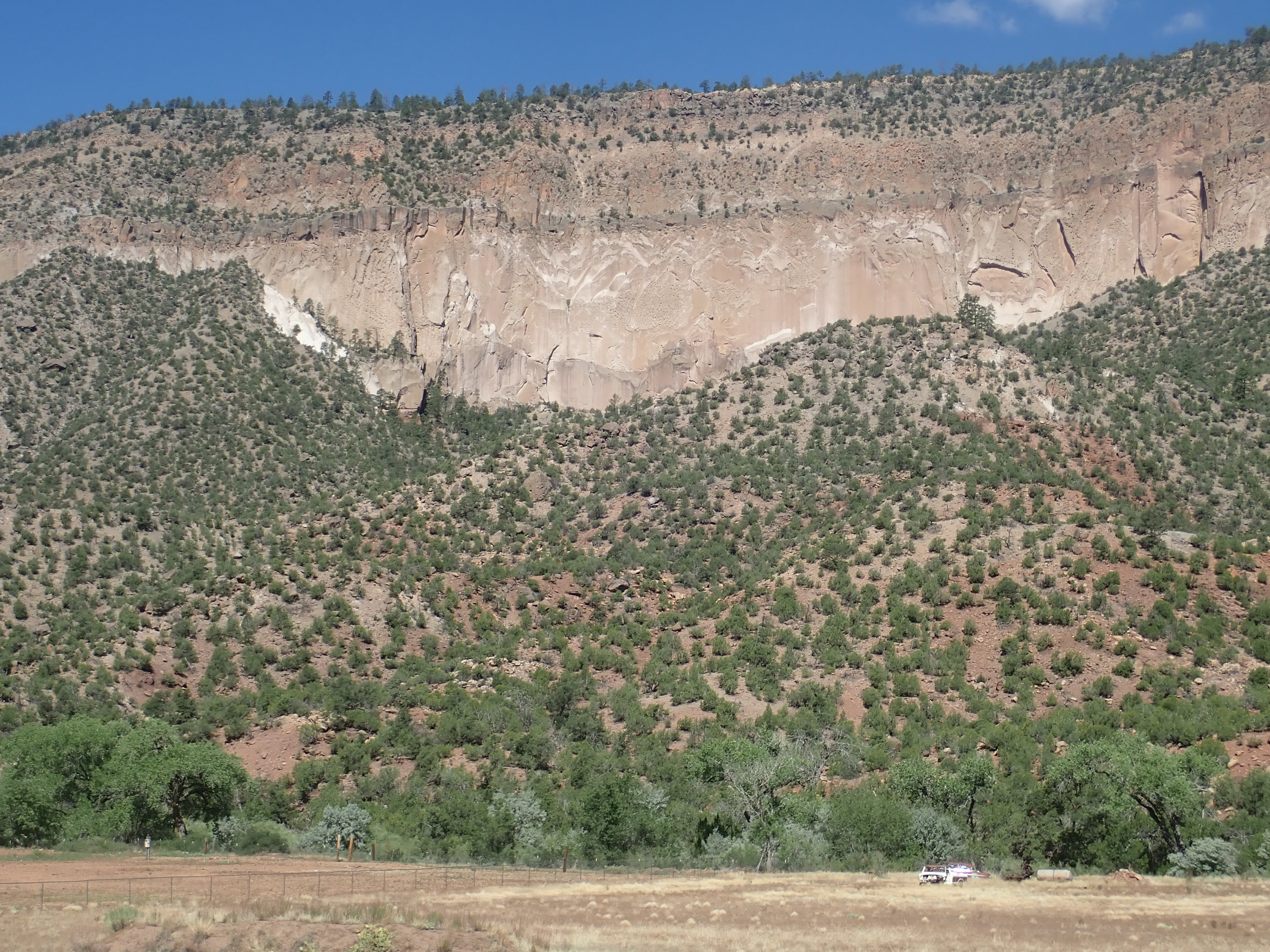
Bandelier Tuff in San Diego Canyon near Jemez Springs

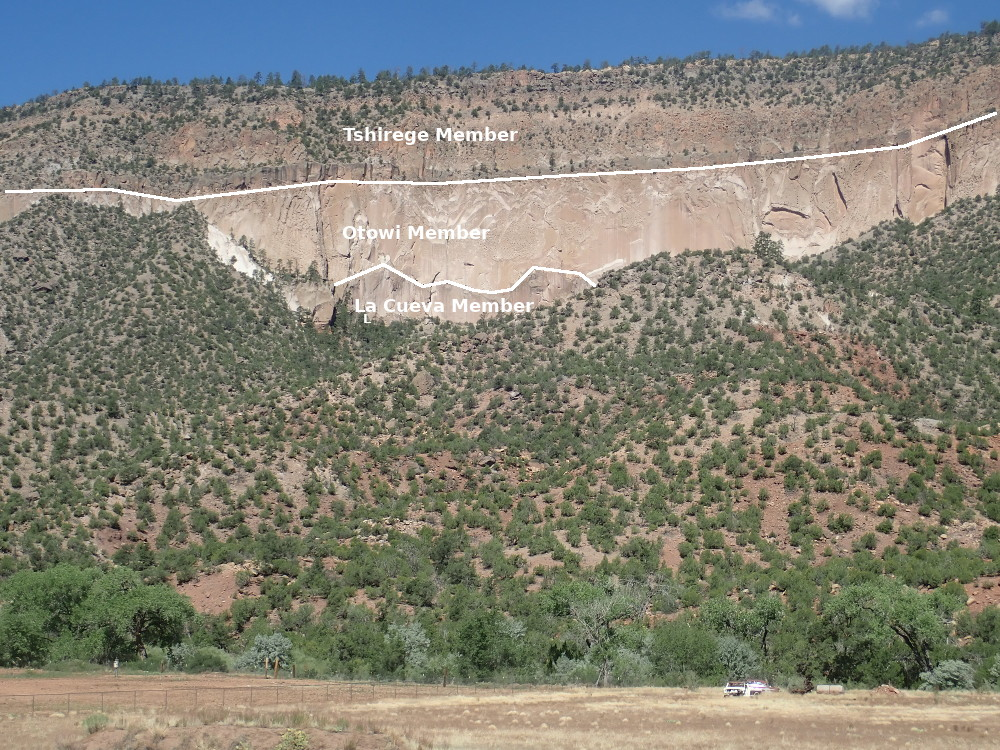
Legend for previous image

The La Cueva Member is an unwelded to poorly welded tuff with phenocrysts of quartz and sanidine and traces of pyroxene and magnetite. It has been divided into two units; the upper unit is nonwelded to slightly welded and contains large pumice clasts, while the lower unit is nonwelded and includes abundant lithic fragments. Separating the two units is a bed of reworked pumice and debris flows. However, the ^{40}Ar/^{39}Ar ages are indistinguishable, at 1.85 ± 0.07 and 1.85 ± 0.04 Ma for the upper and lower units, respectively. The maximum observed thickness is 80 meters (260 feet).

This member was emplaced by the first and smallest (but still enormous) known caldera eruption of the Jemez volcanic field. It is exposed in only a few locations, including San Diego Canyon, the southwestern caldera wall, and in scattered locations on the Pajarito Plateau. It is possible that the Toledo Embayment, a structural feature of the northwest rim of the caldera coincident with a gravity low, is the remnant of the La Cueva caldera. On the other hand, the presence of lithic breccia in this member in the La Cueva area suggests the caldera was located to the southwest.

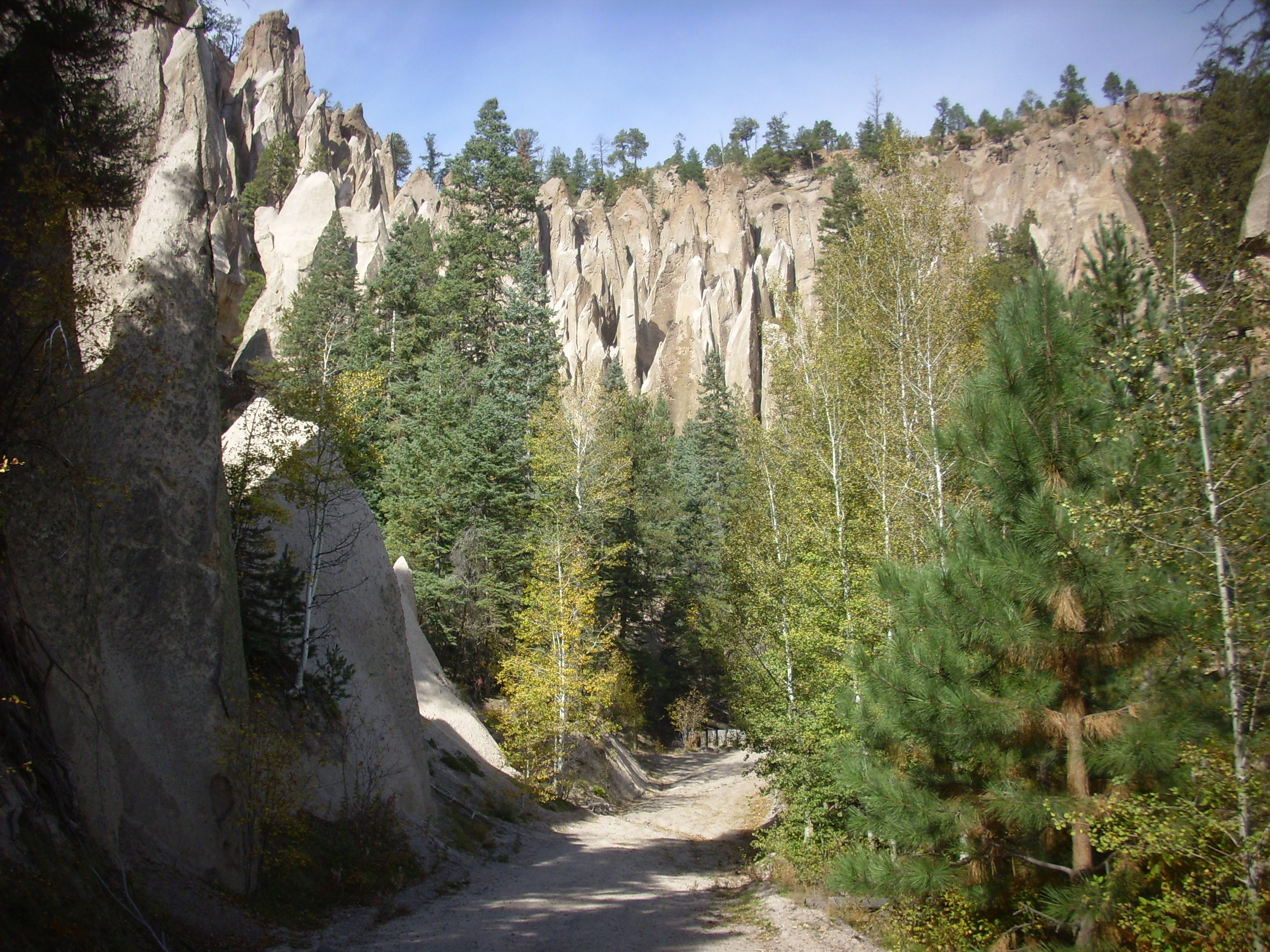
Tent rocks eroded out of the La Cueva Member near La Cueva

The Otowi Member consists of a basal air fall pumice bed (the Guaje Pumice) and a massive, typically unwelded, ignimbrite, though this is densely welded in a few locations. The upper ignimbrite is a rhyolitic ash-flow tuff containing abundant phenocrysts of sanidine and quartz, and sparse mafic microphenocrysts. The sanidine may display a blue iridescence (chatoyance). The member contains abundant fragments of country rock. ^{40}Ar/^{39}Ar radiometric ages for the member range from 1.61 ± 0.01 to 1.62 ± 0.04 Ma. The maximum exposed thickness is about 120 meters (390 feet).

This member was erupted in the Toledo event, which was named after the Toledo Embayment, a structural feature in the northeast caldera wall which was long thought to be the remains of the Toledo caldera. However, more recent work has demonstrated that the Toledo caldera was likely more or less coincident with the Valles caldera. The total dense-rock equivalent volume of the eruption, including pyroclastic flows and ash fall, was between 216 cubic kilometers (52 cu mi) and 550 cubic kilometers (130 cu mi), with the larger estimate placing the eruption in the low end of the supereruption range (VEI 8). The member is exposed over the entire Jemez area, except within the Valles caldera itself, where it is present only in the subsurface. It is particularly extensively exposed in the Jemez Plateau west of the caldera, but is also exposed across much of the Pajarito Plateau east of the caldera at the bases of its characteristic finger mesas. Distant isolated outcrops suggest that thin ash flows of the Otowi Member may have covered the Española and Santo Domingo basins. These have since been mostly eroded away.

Ash matching the Otowi Member in age and chemistry has been found as far away as Mount Blanco, Texas, where it forms a bed 30 centimeters (12 in) thick.

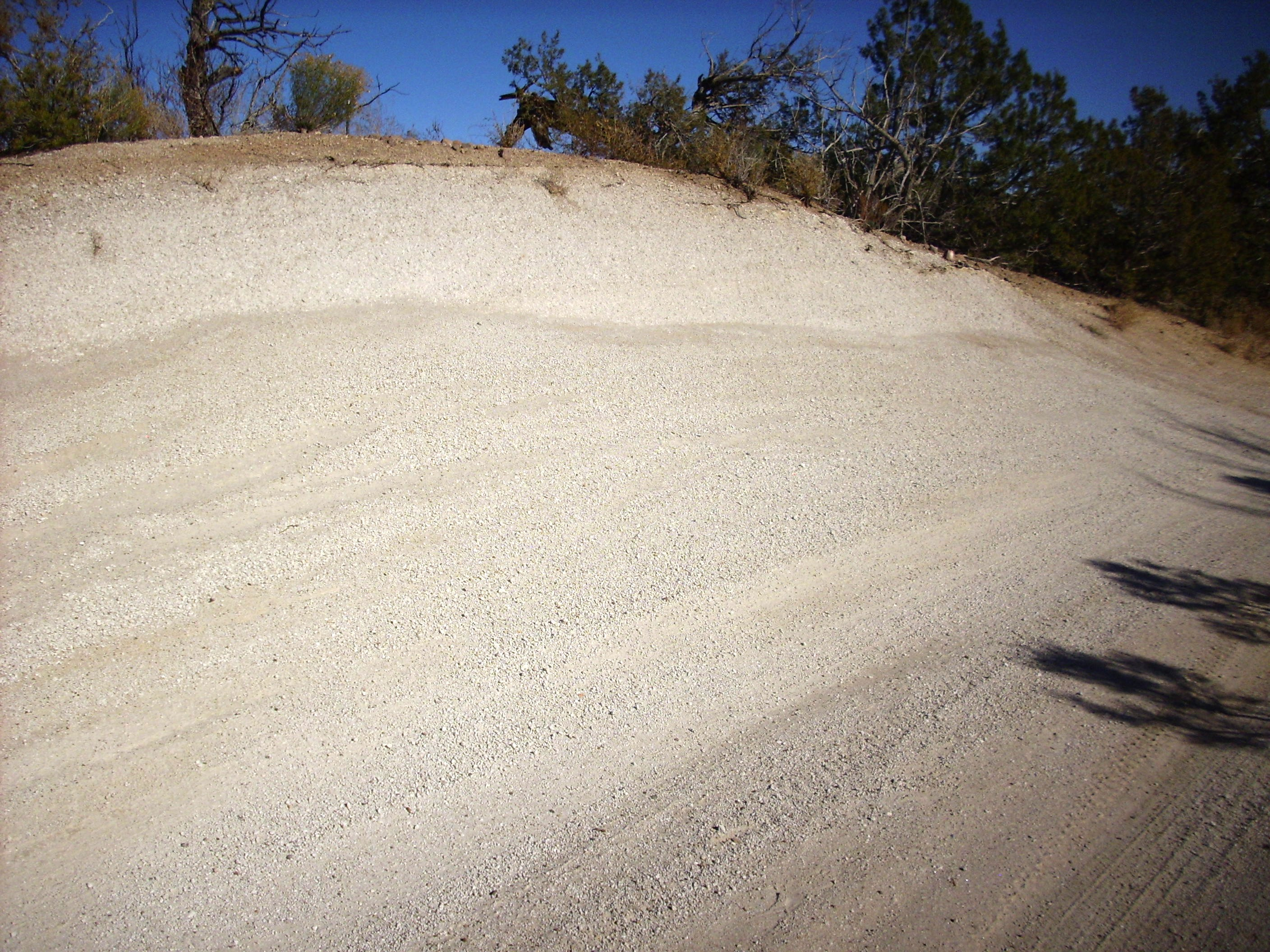
Guaje Pumice bed north of Los Alamos.

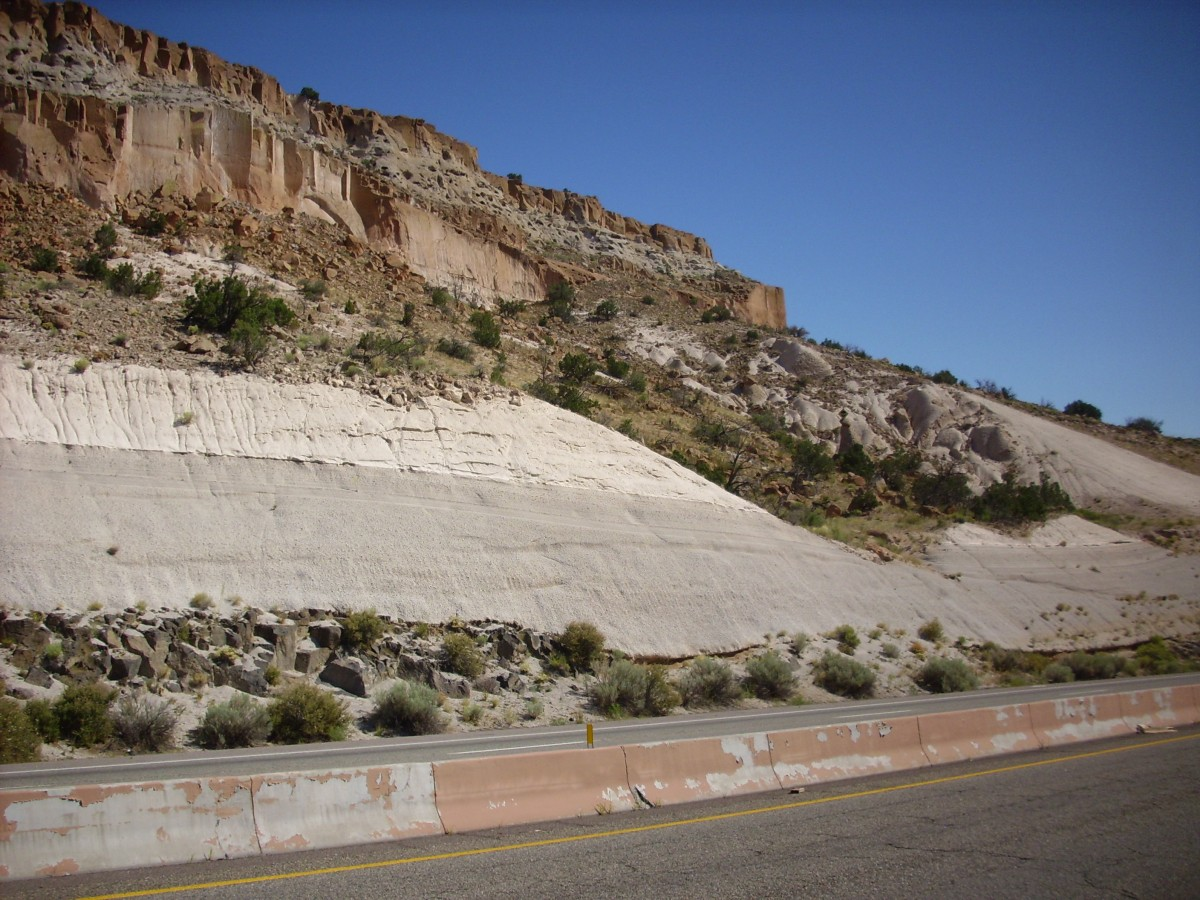
Road cut exposing Otowi Member in Pueblo Canyon. Above are cliffs of Tsherige Member.

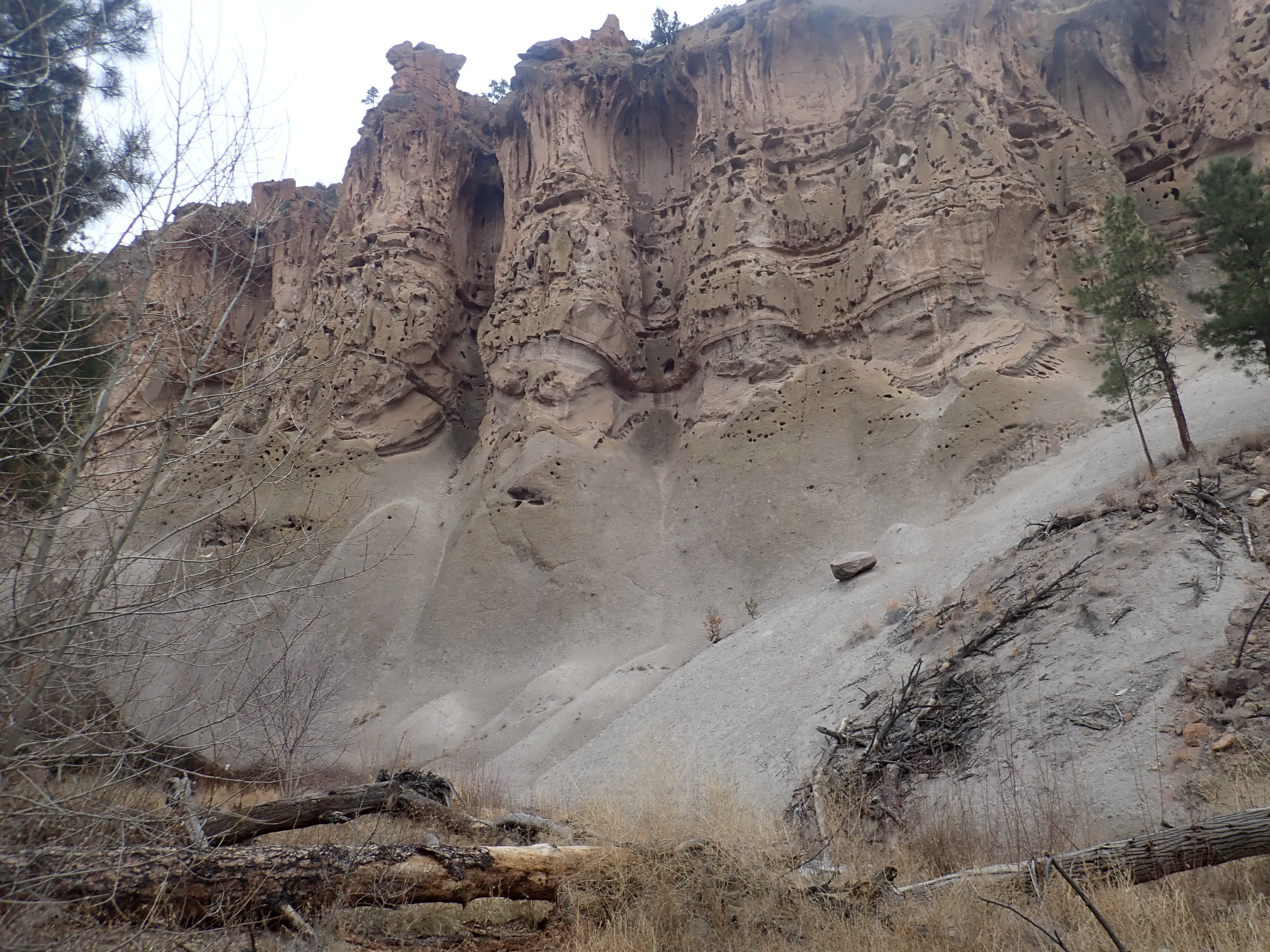
Contact of Tsherige and Otowi Members at Bandelier National Monument

The Tshirege Member has been described as "arguably New Mexico's most famous rock". It consists of multiple flows of densely welded to nonwelded rhyolitic ash-flow tuff. These contain abundant phenocrysts of sanidine and quartz, sparse microphenocrysts of clinopyroxene and orthopyroxene, and extremely rare microphenocrysts of fayalite. In the more densely welded portions of the member, the sanidine is chatoyant. The member typically contains fragments of country rock, and locally has a thin (less than 2 meters (6.6 foot)) basal pumice and surge deposit bed, the Tsankawi Pumice Bed. This bed contains roughly 1% of hornblende dacite pumice.

The member is exposed throughout the Jemez region and within the Valles Caldera, and has a maximum thickness of over 900 meters (3,000 feet). It was emplaced by the Valles event, which took place 1.256 million years ago and created the Valles caldera.

The Tshirege Member is described as a compound cooling unit, composed of distinct pulses of deposition, and two schemes have been developed to label its beds. The Rogers classification divides the member into lettered zones A through F based purely on mappable lithological criteria, while the Broxton and Reneau classification divides the member into numbered Qbt 1g through Qbt 4 zones based on interpretation as cooling units. The two schemes can be placed in close correspondence across most of the Pajarito Plateau. The division between the A unit (Qbt 1g) and B unit (Qbt 1vc) is particularly striking and is described as a vapor phase notch. This is recognizable across the Pajarito Plateau but is interpreted by Broxton and Reneau as a devitrification front rather than a cooling unit boundary. The beds below the vapor phase notch are glassy tuffs while those above are devitrified; the beds are otherwise chemically and petrologically indistinguishable.

In many locations, the Tshirege Member is separated from the Otowi Member by the Pueblo Canyon Member of the Cerro Toledo Formation.

Ash matching the Tsankawi Pumice in age and composition has been found as far away as Utah and may have reached western Canada. The distant dispersal is likely a result of the eruption column penetrating the jet stream.

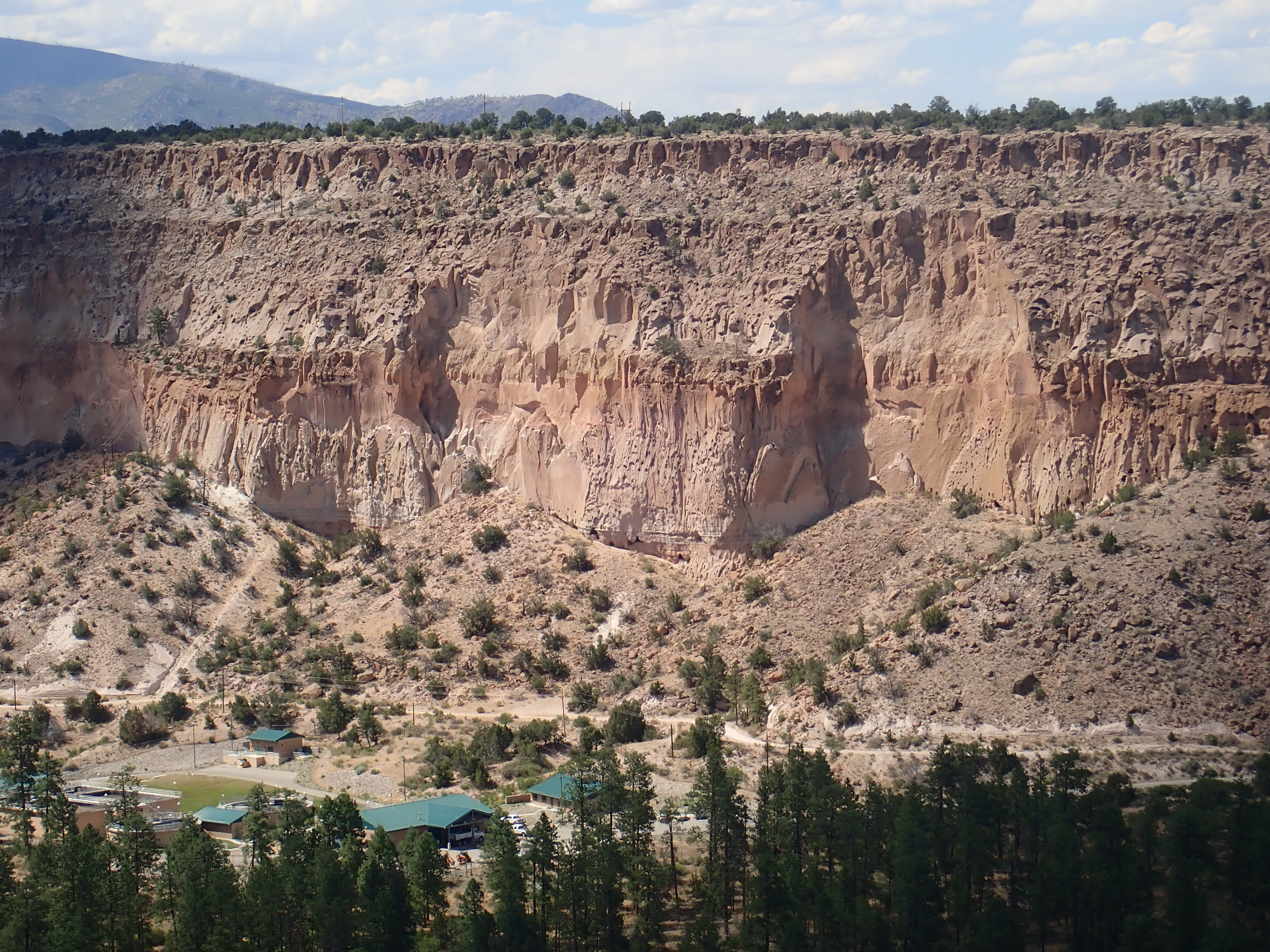
Close view of Tshirege Member at Kwage Mesa

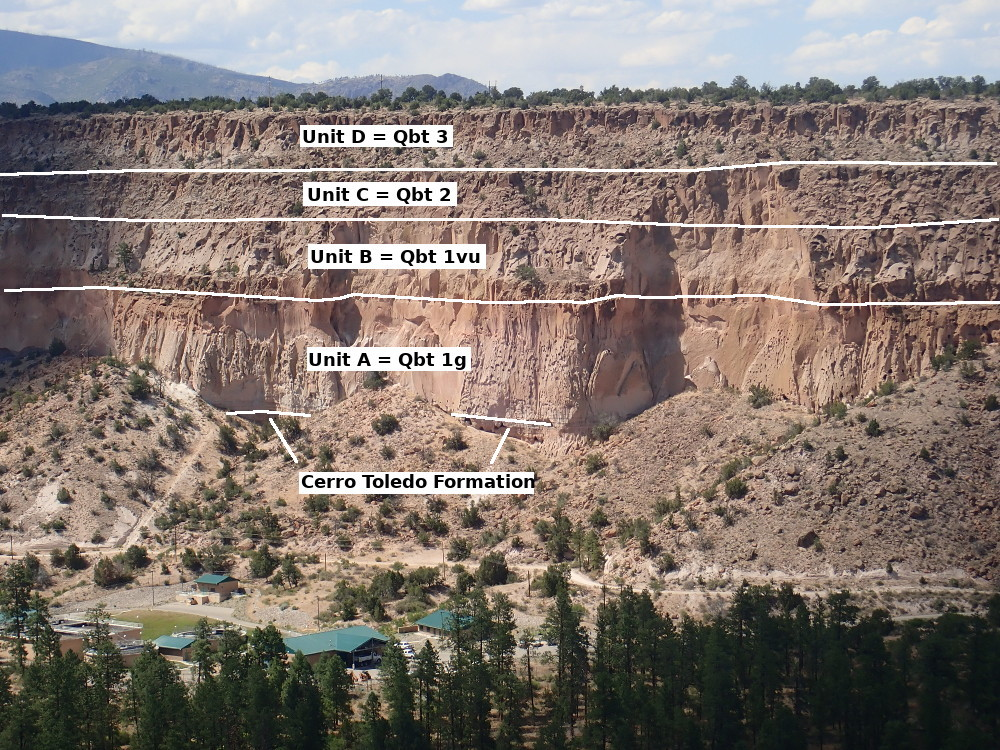
Previous image with beds labeled according to Rogers (1995) and Broxton and Reneau (1995) schemes.

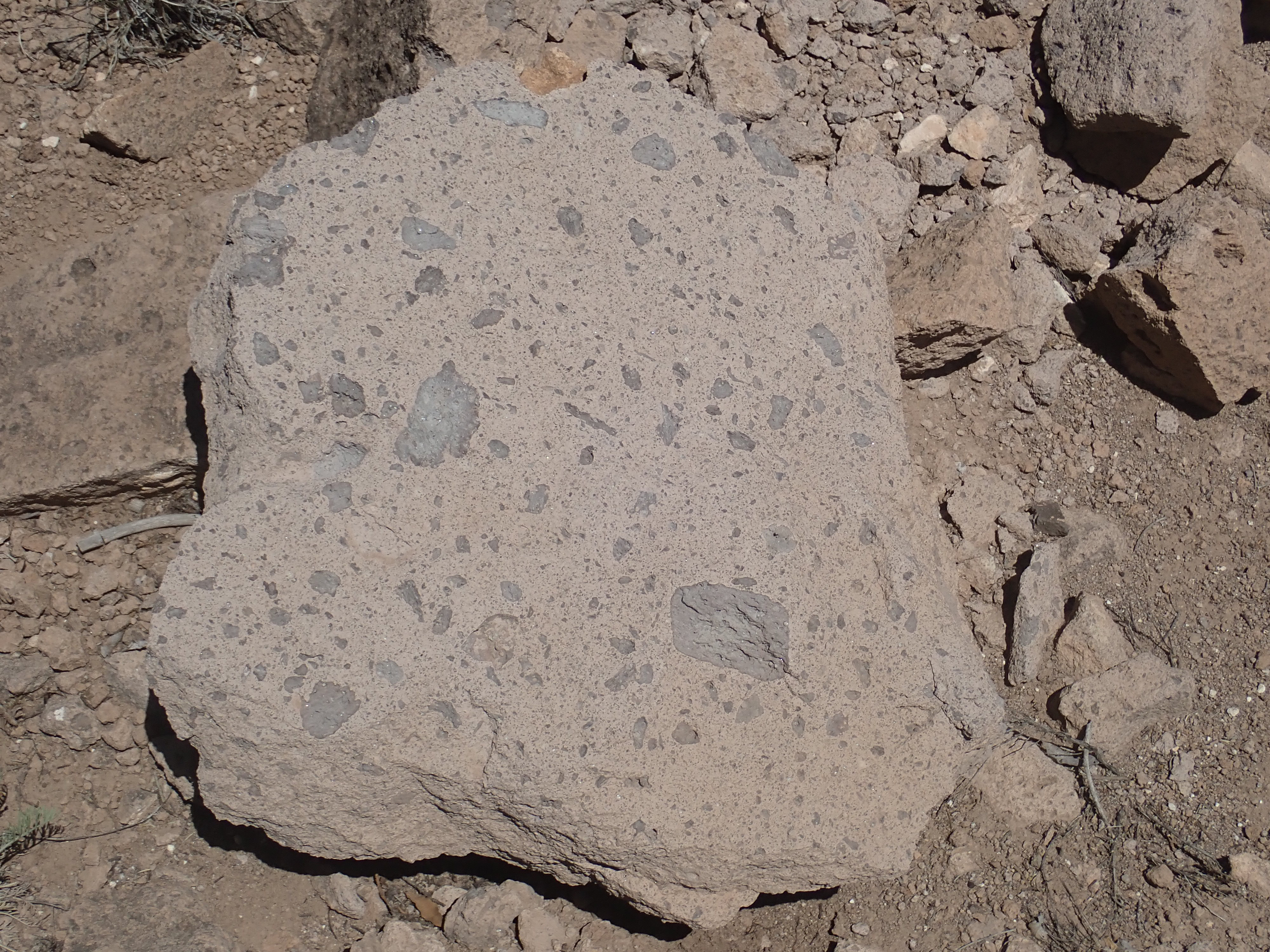
Sample of Tsherige Member (probably "C" bed) south of White Rock

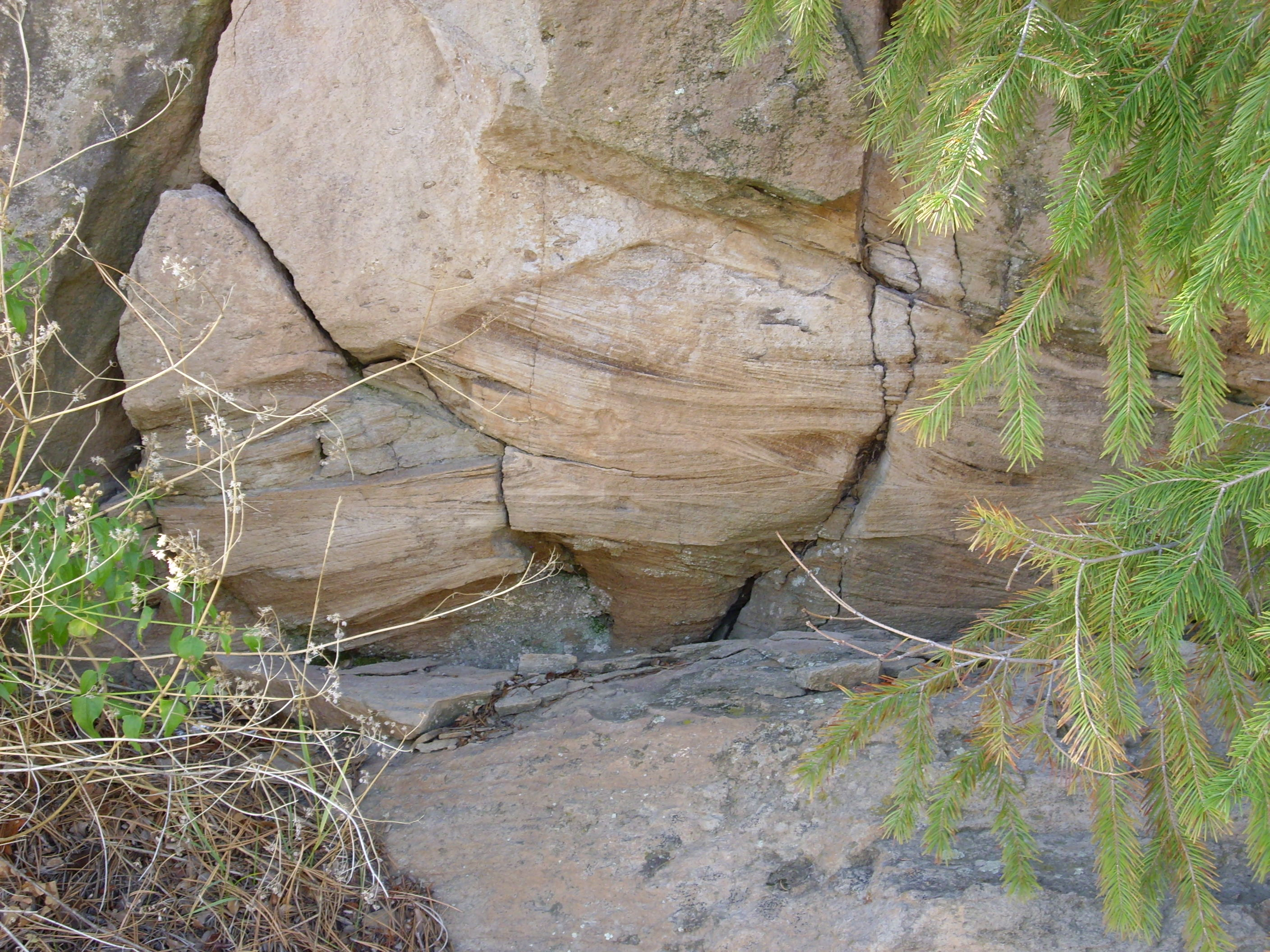
Surge beds in the "E" unit of the Tsherige Member.

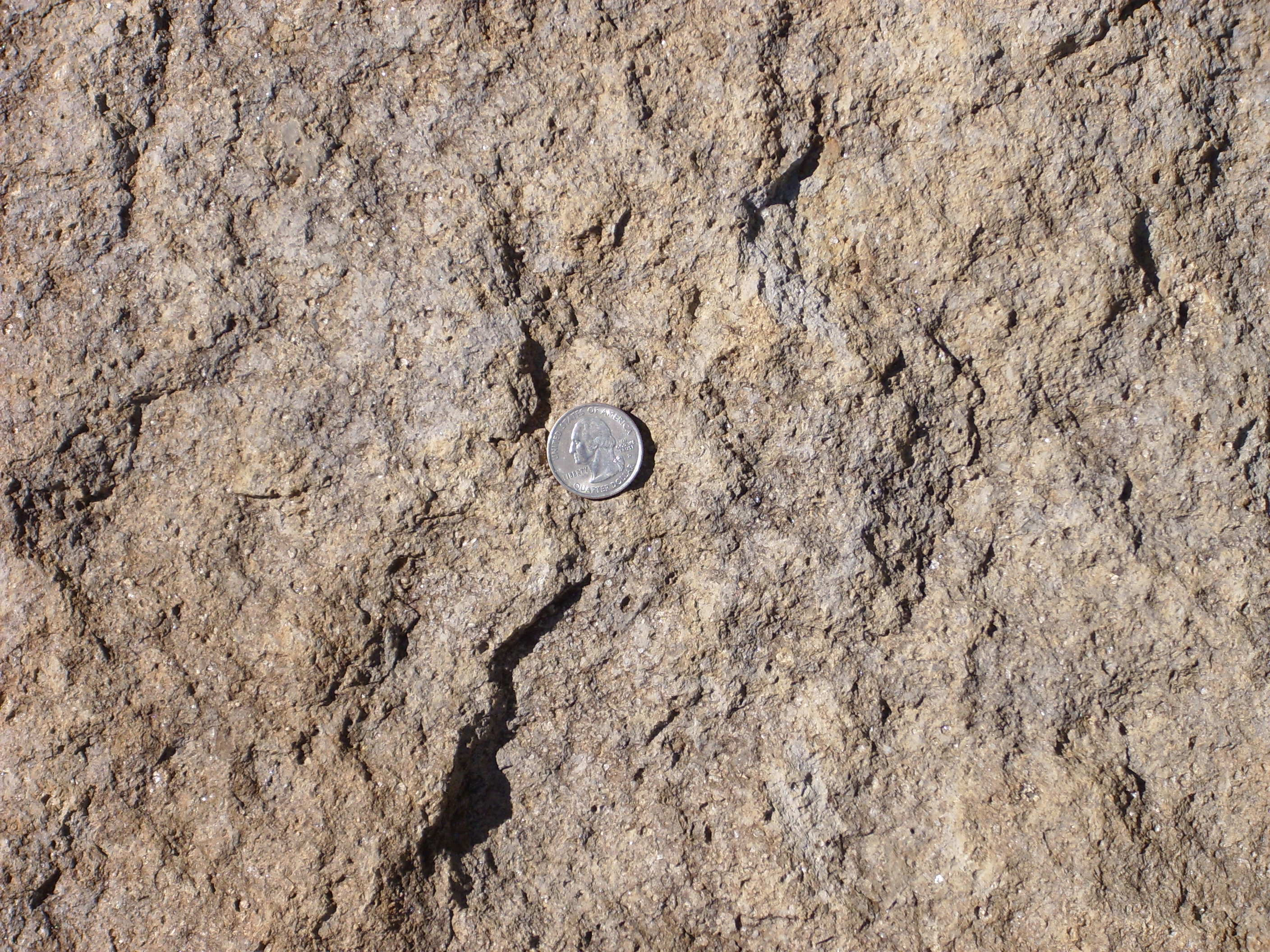
Close up of "E" bed of the Tsherige Member. U.S. quarter dollar (2.4 cm) for scale.

Much of the material in these deposits now forms the Pajarito Plateau, a scenic region of canyons and mesas on which Los Alamos is situated.

== Economic geology ==
Pumice has been extensively mined from the Guaje Pumice Bed on the east flanks of the Jemez Mountains. Production was high enough in 1994 to help make New Mexico the second largest producer of pumice among the United States. The pumice itself is unconsolidated and easily removed once the overburden (typically Otowi Member ignimbrite) is removed. Much of the pumice was strip mined from public lands before reclamation bonds were required, leaving mining scars that are slowly revegetating.

== History of investigation ==
The formation was given its name by H.T.U. Smith in 1938. The formation was divided into upper and lower units, which were recognized almost at once to correspond to separate caldera eruptions. In 1964, R.L. Griggs assigned the formal member names of Otowi Member to the lower unit and Tshirege Member to the upper unit, and gave the name Guaje Pumice to the basal pumice bed of the Otowi Member. In their paper establishing the stratigraphic framework for the Jemez volcanic field in 1969, R.L. Smith, R.A. Bailey, and C.S. Ross adopted Grigg's unit names and added the name Tsankawi Pumice for the basal pumice bed of the Tsherige Member.

In their 2011 map of the Valles Caldera, Fraser Goff and his coinvestigators formally added the La Cueva Member, informally known until then as the ignimbrite of San Diego Canyon, to the Bandelier Tuff.
