= William Boone Douglass =

William Boone Douglass was a lawyer, engineer, surveyor, genealogist, and founding President of the Boone Family Association. Earlier in his engineering career, he was active in New Mexico both as an engineer and as an anthropologist.

He made a particular study of the prehistoric homes of the Tewa and other Pueblo peoples of New Mexico, and was instrumental in the protection of the shrine on Redondo Peak, sacred to the Pueblo.

On August 14, 1909, Douglass, then Examiner of Surveys of the General Land Office, discovered the world's greatest natural bridge, in southern Utah, which he named "The Rainbow Natural Bridge."

== Family ==
Born in Corydon, Indiana, USA on 30 June 1864, he was the son and eldest child of Judge Benjamin Pennebaker Douglass (teacher, merchant, attorney, and politician) and Queen Victoria Boone. He married Alvira Luckett (called Allie), daughter of Hiram and Amanda Luckett. They had 4 children, Marguerite Douglass; Dorothy Douglass; Maude Douglass and William Douglass.
