= Jemez National Recreation Area =

- Location within the United States
- Location: Sandoval County, New Mexico, United States
- Nearest city: Jemez Springs, New Mexico
- Coordinates: 35.77778°N 106.68778°W
- Area: 57,650 acres (233.3 km^{2})
- Established: 10/12/1993
- Governing body: United States Forest Service

Jemez National Recreation Area is a national recreation area in the U.S. state of New Mexico. Located in Santa Fe National Forest, the U.S. Forest Service recreation area comprises 57,650 acres (23,330 ha) and is administered by the U.S. Forest Service's Jemez Ranger District. The Forest Service administers the lands to promote the area for fishing, camping, rock climbing, hunting and hiking. Hunting is specifically permitted in the national recreation area. The government is required to consult with Jemez Pueblo on matters concerning cultural and religious sites and may close areas for traditional uses by the pueblo. Mining is prohibited, except on pre-existing claims.

About 9,350 acres (3,780 ha) are private lands. The national recreation area borders on Valles Caldera National Preserve. About 1.6 million people visit the area each year.

Jemez National Recreation Area was established in 1993 by Public Law 103-104.
