= Pajarito Plateau =

Volcanic plateau in New Mexico, USA

Coordinates: 35°51′N 106°18′W

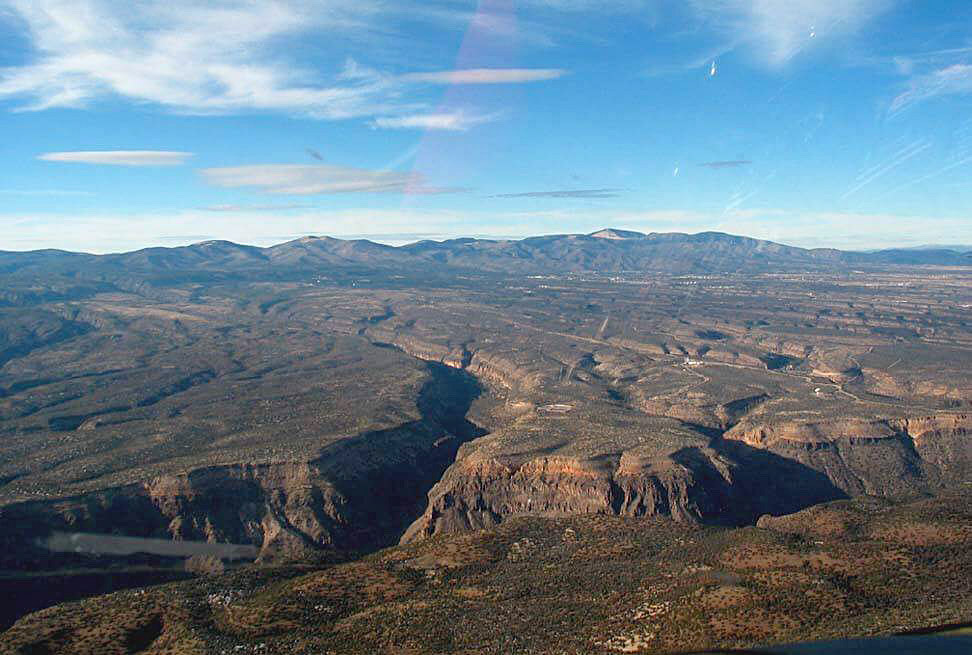
An aerial photo of the Pajarito Plateau. The town of Los Alamos can be seen in the distance

The Pajarito Plateau is a volcanic plateau in north central New Mexico, United States. The plateau, part of the Jemez Mountains, is bounded on the west by the Sierra de los Valles, the range forming the east rim of the Valles Caldera, and on the east by the Puye escarpment, which rises about 300 to 400 feet (90 to 100 m) above the Rio Grande valley about a mile (1.6 km) west of the river. The Rio Grande passes through White Rock Canyon to the southeast, and the Caja del Rio (Cerros del Rio) across the river is sometimes regarded as part of the plateau. The plateau is occupied by several notable entities, including Bandelier National Monument, the town of Los Alamos and its remote suburb White Rock, and Los Alamos National Laboratory. Elevations range from about 5,600 feet (1,700 meters) at the river to about 7,800 feet (2,400 meters) where the plateau merges into the mountain range.

The Pajarito Plateau is primarily composed of Bandelier Tuff, a voluminous deposit of volcanic tuff laid down in an explosive eruption — in this case, a pair of eruptions from the nearby Valles Caldera. The two ignimbrite-forming eruptions occurred about 1.6 million and 1.2 million years ago and ejected about 300 cubic kilometers of rock each. The orange-pink rock formations constituting the resulting ignimbrites are known as the Otowi and Tshirege Members of the Bandelier tuff. The tuff lies on top of a volcanic field, exposed to the east, which used to be continuous with the Caja del Rio (now across the Rio Grande).

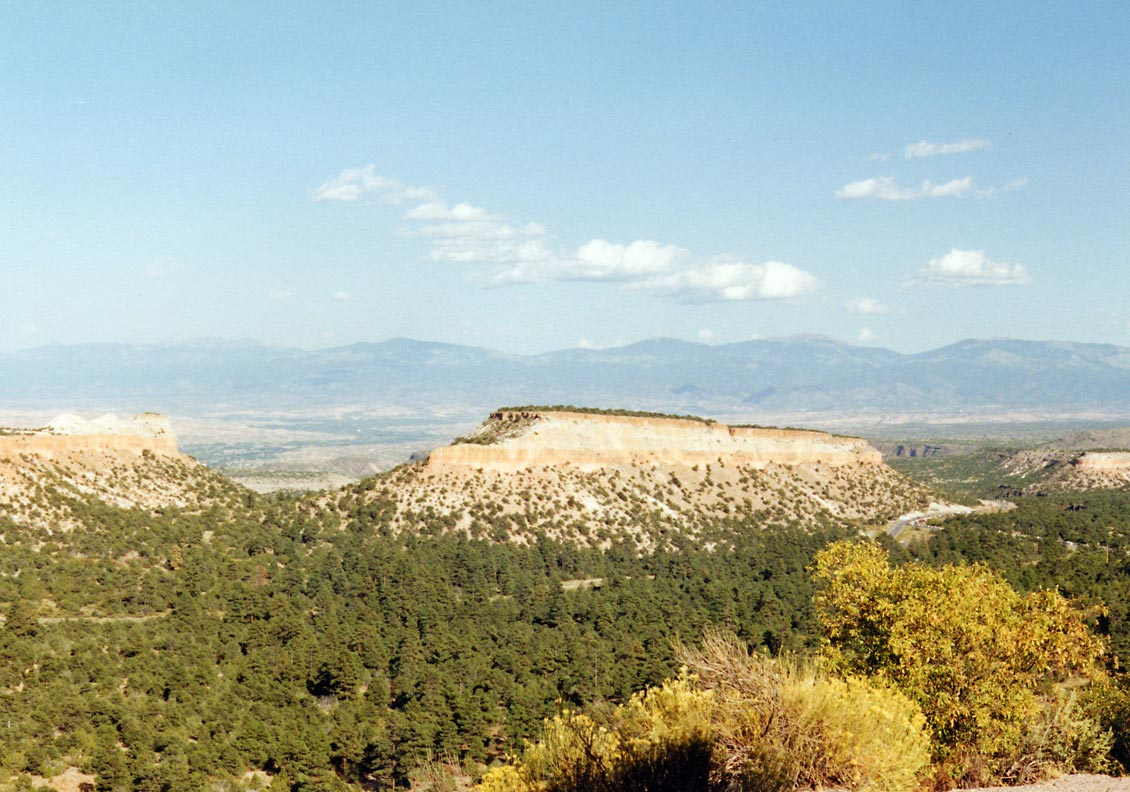
An isolated mesa of the Pajarito Plateau

Erosion has created a maze of canyons up to 800 feet (240 meters) deep that dissect the plateau into mesas. Many of these mesas climb on the western side rather than descending on all sides, thus sometimes are referred to as potreros. Rock climbing is popular here with locals and visitors alike, and is done in the canyons on basalt cliffs that lie within and below the tuff, which itself is too soft to be climbed safely.

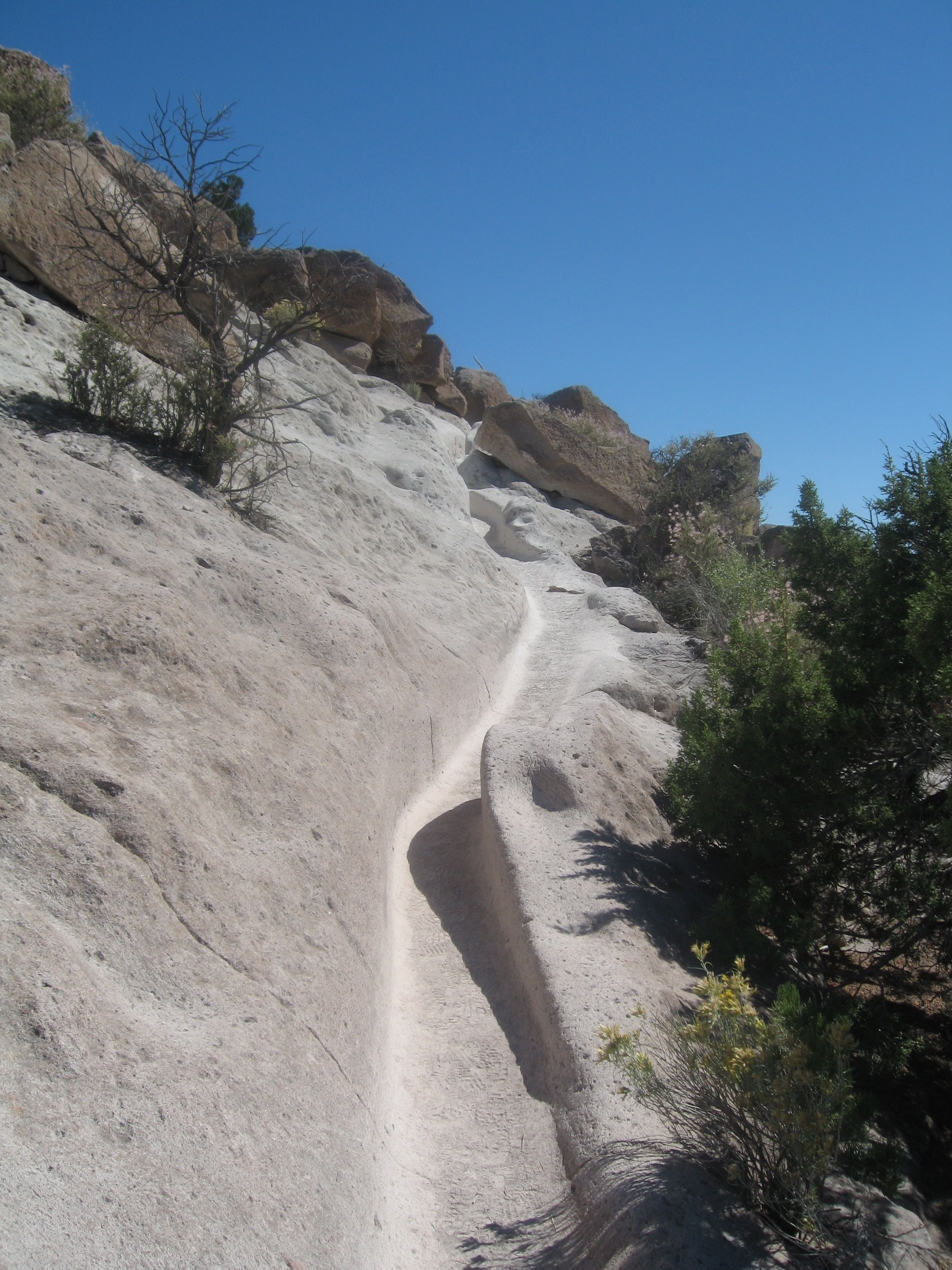
A trail worn in the soft Bandelier tuff

The canyons and mesas are highly scenic and well endowed with trails, about which numerous guidebooks have been written. Some trails reach the Rio Grande; others reach the rim of the Valles Caldera. Some are long distance trails, of which a few have been used for ultramarathons and endurance rides. Popular uses include walking, dog walking, running, orienteering and rogaining, mountain biking, and horse riding.

Due to constraints of geography and land ownership, both Los Alamos and White Rock are compact populated places. Outside of these, the plateau is sparsely populated and wildlife is abundant and diverse. A large elk herd that spends summers in the Jemez Mountains descends to the Pajarito Plateau during the winter, creating a significant driving hazard. Deer, black bear and coyote are common, and the plateau and mountains support a small but stable population of mountain lions, which typically flee from humans. Smaller mammals such as raccoons, skunks, and gophers are common. Parts of the Bandelier backcountry have been closed seasonally due to nesting bald eagles. The Rio Grande supports a significant migratory flyway that brings many other birds (notably sandhill cranes) to the plateau during migration seasons, and three species of hummingbirds are abundant during summer. White Rock Canyon, the major canyon containing the Rio Grande into which the plateau's canyons empty, is notorious for rattlesnakes.

The Pajarito Plateau has been home to Native American communities for at least 11,000 years. Archaeological evidence indicates both seasonal and permanent use of the Plateau throughout the Paleoindian, Archaic, Developmental, Coalition, Classic, and historic periods. Ancestral Puebloans who used the Plateau have ties to modern Puebloan tribes in New Mexico.

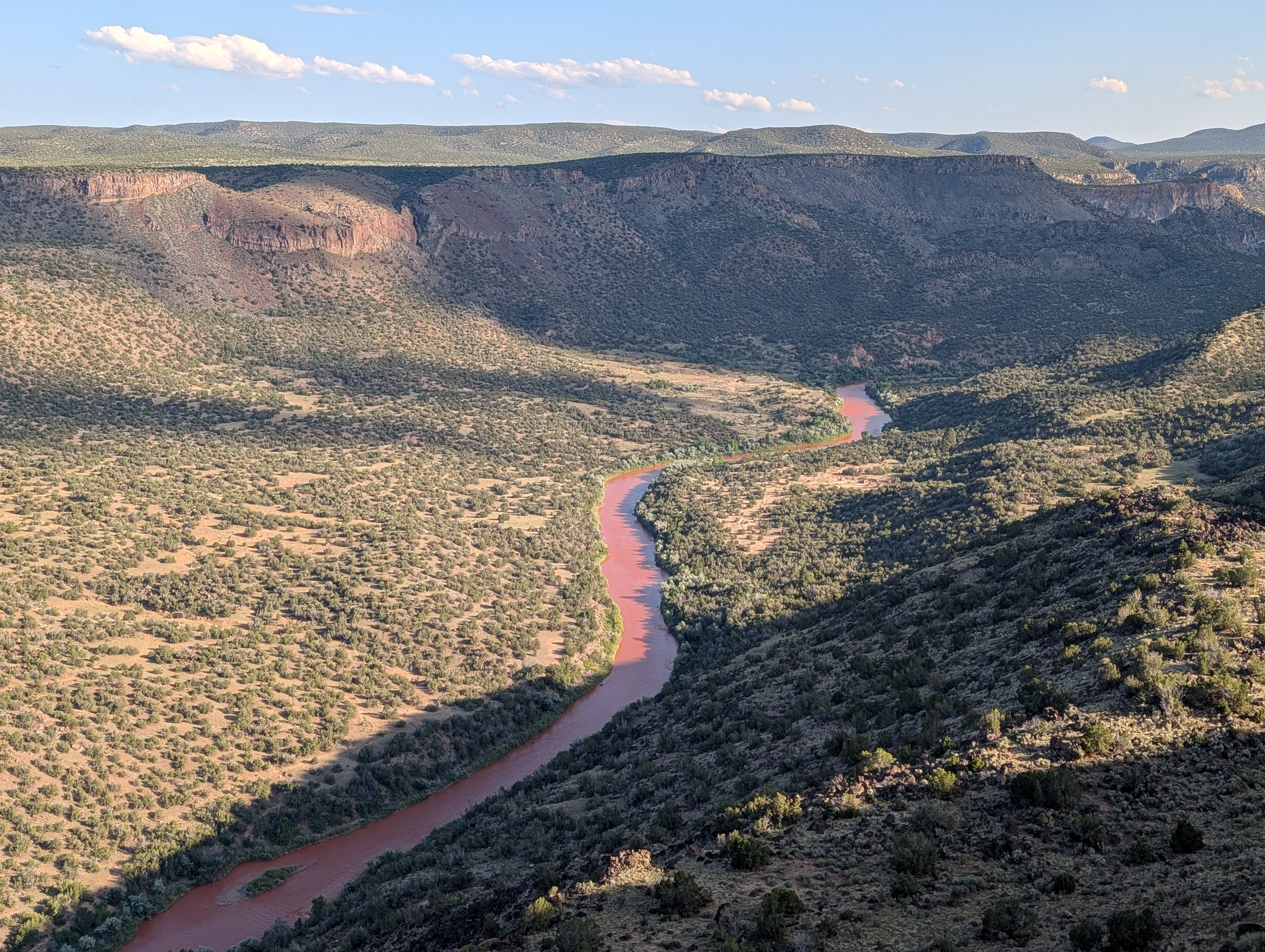
The Rio Grande in White Rock Canyon, red from recent storm runoff, viewed from the Puye escarpment, at White Rock, New Mexico

== See also ==
- Acquiring land for Los Alamos Laboratory
- Bandelier National Monument
- Caja del Rio
- Jemez Mountains
- Rio Grande rift
