= Acquiring land for Los Alamos Laboratory =

Coordinates: 35°52′32″N 106°19′27″W

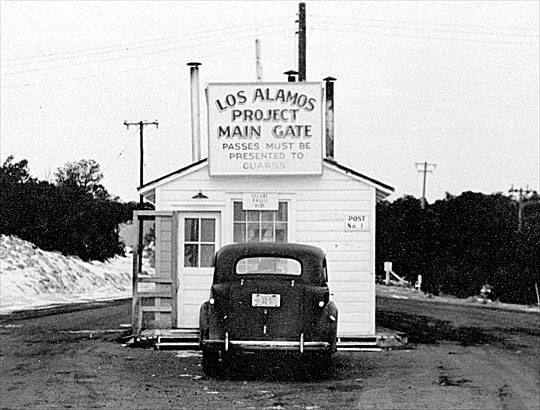
Entrance to Los Alamos Laboratory was highly restricted during World War II

Acquiring land for Los Alamos Laboratory in New Mexico during World War II required transfers of property from the U.S. Department of Agriculture to the Department of War, a donation of land by the San Ildefonso Pueblo, and the purchase or condemnation of private property. Almost 50,000 acres (20,000 ha) of land were acquired. The expectation of some of the previous owners was that the property would be returned to them at the end of the war, but the Los Alamos Laboratory, renamed the Los Alamos National Laboratory, retained ownership of most of the land.

The most adversely impacted by the land acquisition process were two dozen Hispano homesteaders who were forced to sell their land cheaply and move out of the project area. Protests and lawsuits concerning ownership of the lands continued into the 21st century as the descendants of former owners sought what they considered fair compensation for their former lands. Acts by the U.S. Congress helped redress some of the claims. The World War II acquisition process was called "unconstitutional" by land scholar Malcolm Ebright.

== Background ==
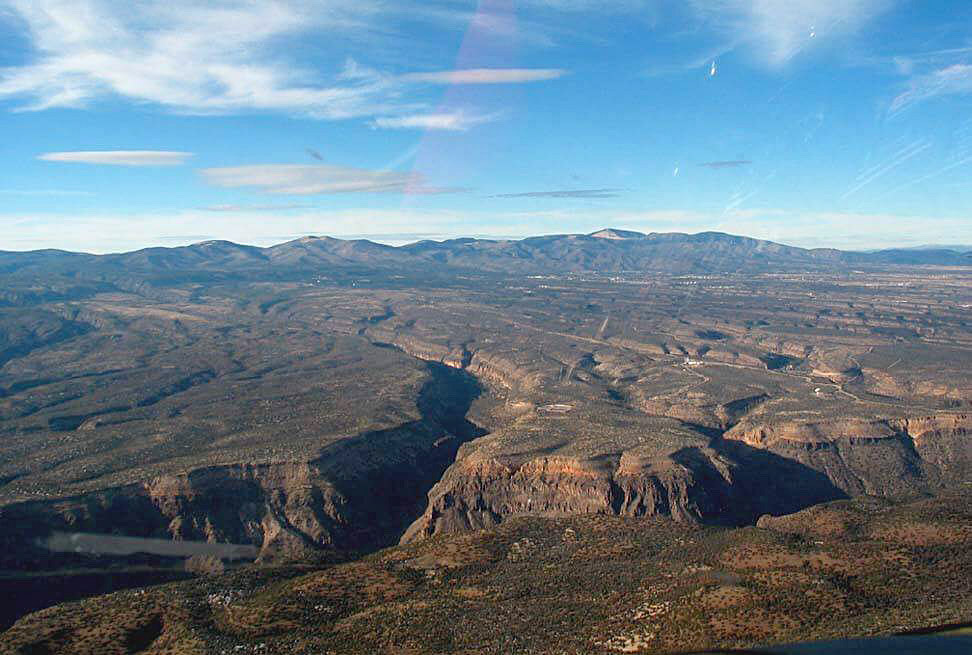
The Pajarito Plateau looking west to Los Alamos and the Jemez Mountains

The Los Alamos Laboratory was created during World War II to design and build the first nuclear weapons. Los Alamos is located on the semi-arid Pajarito Plateau at elevations ranging from about 6,000 ft (1,800 m) to 7,800 ft (2,400 m). The Pajarito Plateau consists of several finger-like mesas separated by steep canyons. The plateau is about 12 miles (19 km) wide from east to west, overlooking the Rio Grande on the east and merging with the higher elevations of the Jemez Mountains on the west.

Archaeological evidence of Native American (Indian) presence on the plateau dates back 10,000 years. Beginning about 1200 CE, Ancestral Puebloans built settlements and farmed the plateau. A cooler climate probably forced the Ancestral Puebloans to depart the plateau before 1550. Hispanic settlement of the plateau began in the late 19th century. In November 1942, the Pajarito Plateau was selected as the site for building a nuclear bomb. Acquisition of land for the project began in February 1943.

== Acquiring land ==
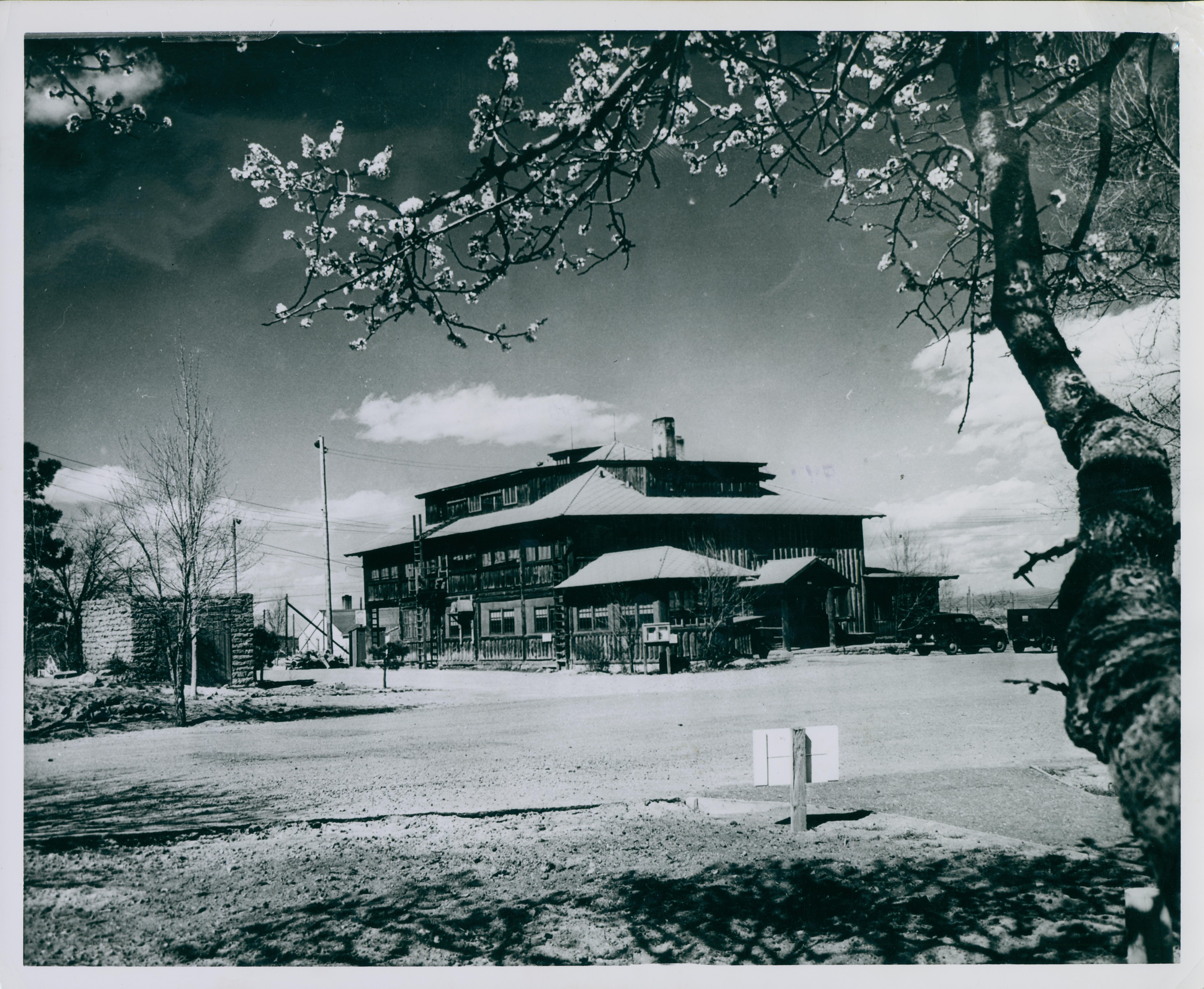
The Los Animas Ranch School before World War II

Security and secrecy were absolute priorities of the Manhattan Project. The Pajarito Plateau was selected because of its isolation and sparse settlement. To preserve security and secrecy, a large amount of land was needed with strict regulations regarding ingress and egress. Most of the needed land was owned by the federal government. In March 1943, 45,100 acres (18,300 ha) of federally owned land was transferred from the Department of Agriculture to the Department of War for the project. The remaining land was acquired by purchase of the Los Alamos Ranch School, one Anglo-owned ranch, and the land of 23 homesteaders, all or most of whom were Hispanics. After negotiations, the government paid $225 per acre for the 790 acres (320 ha) of the Anglo-owned school and its buildings and $43 per acre for the 322 acres (130 ha) of the Anglo-owned ranch. The Hispanic setttlers were paid as little as seven dollars per acre for their land. All permits to graze livestock in the project area were cancelled. Permit holders were paid $20 to $30 for each head of livestock which had grazed there.

Some of the land acquired belonged to the San Ildefonso Pueblo which claimed ownership of much of the Pajarito Plateau in addition to the land on its reservation. The Puebloans donated land to Los Alamos in late 1942 to help the war effort and later said they believed the land would be returned to them after World War II.

=== The homesteaders ===
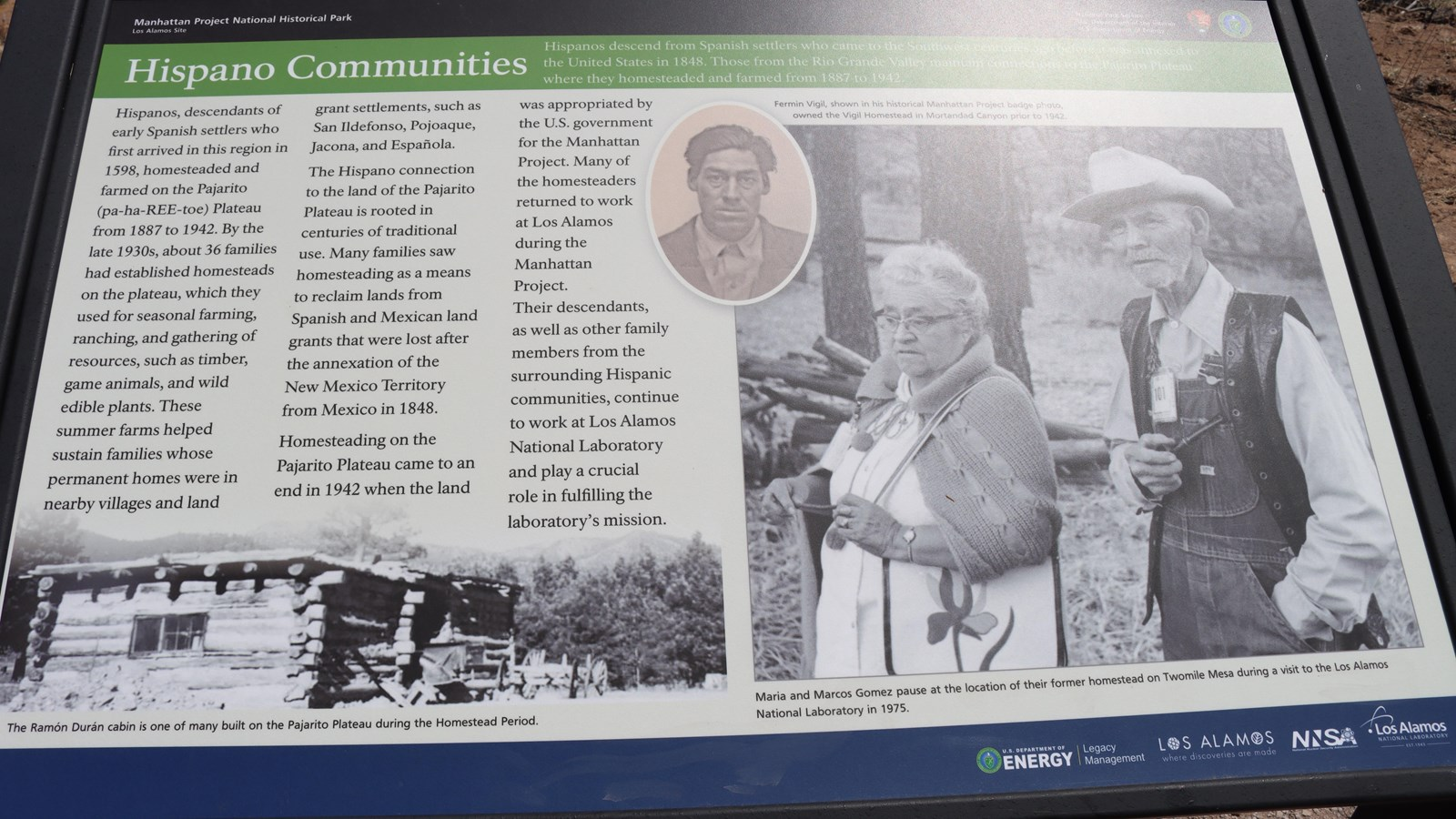
A wayside display in Los Alamos

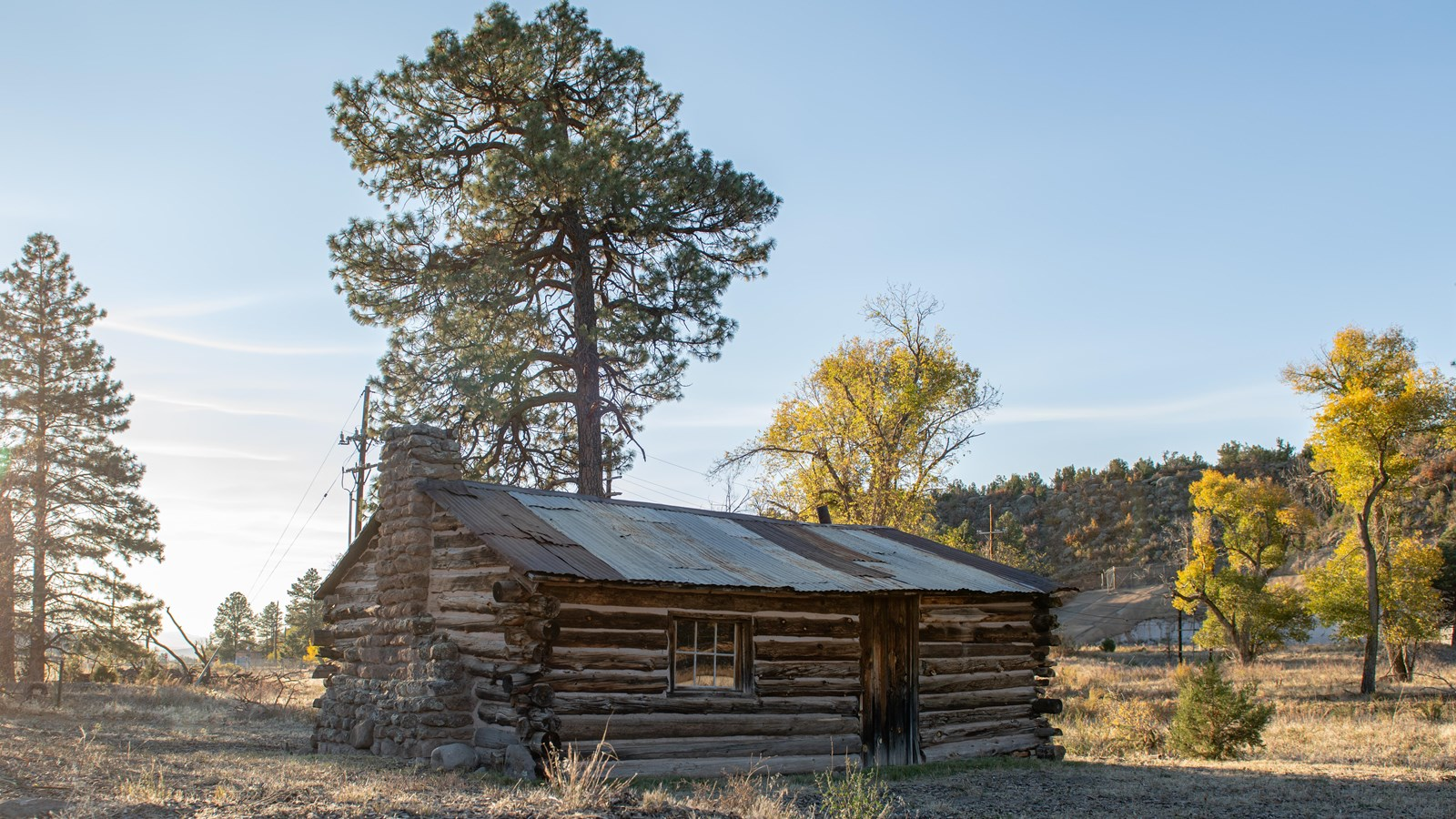
Pond Cabin is one of only two buildings surviving from before the creation of the Los Alamos Laboratory.

The Homestead Act of 1862 gave private citizens the right to select up to 160 acres (65 ha) from publicly-owned lands and become owners of the land after making improvements. The first homesteaders moved into the area in the 1880s. The 27 proprietors of 23 homesteads within the boundaries of the Los Alamos site owned 1,990 acres (810 ha). All or nearly all of the homesteaders were Hispanos. They were mostly poor people who spoke little or no English.

The expulsion of the homesteaders from their lands by the U.S. army was rapid and brutal. The six-member Gomez family, who had lived on the land since 1899 and had three cabins on their property, farmed 40 acres (16 ha), and owned 40 cows and 300 goats said that "they came and decimated everything....buildings, corrales, and homes." Their buildings were bulldozed and their livestock was shot. A check of a little more than $1,100 for their property was sent to an unknown address. The compensation the Gomez family received of $7 per acre was typical of that given Hispano homesteaders, far less than that paid to the Anglo-owned school and ranch. The homesteaders "held more than two-thirds of the privately owned land...but they received less than one-eighth of the money." Land scholar Ebright call the dispossession of the homesteaders as "unconstitutional."

Rosario Martinez Fiorillo described the expulsion of her family from their lands by the U.S. army:..."they were frightened by these people in uniform. They came with guns and whatnot, and all of a sudden they came to them and they told them...We're going to take over. The government wants your land...they did not understand most of the stuff [in English." Many local people, including some of the displaced homesteaders, became employed by the Los Alamos Laboratory, the "secret city," or its resident scientists as maids, construction workers, and janitors. One Hispano who spoke little English even worked as an armed guard for an Anglo female who spoke no Spanish and carried messages between Santa Fe and Los Alamos. For the locals, the secret city was not so secret. There was discrimination. Dimas Chavez said, "we had our share of Archie Bunkers up there" and told of being invited to Anglo birthday parties but served cake and ice cream outside the house rather than inside with the other guests.

== Protests and lawsuits ==
In the 1960s, activist Reies Tijerina, who led the "Courthouse Raid" in New Mexico, attempted to make a citizen's arrest of Norris Bradbury, head of what was now called the Los Alamos National Laboratory (LANL). The issue was land taken over by Los Alamos from Hispano owners. The issue simmered until the 1990s when descendants of the displaced homesteaders took legal action. The claim was that the land taken from Hispanos during World War II should have been returned to them after the war. The Pajarito Plateau Homesteader's Association was formed and in 2004, the U.S. Congress approved $10 million to compensate 973 descendants and one survivor of the original homesteaders. Lawyers received $2 million out of the $10 million compensation. The average payment was $8,000 to each of the descendants. The claimants accepted the settlement, although a fair settlement, according to the president of the Homesteader's Association, would have been $60 million.

The Homesteader's Association also filed a lawsuit alleging human rights violations during World War II. They claimed that their ancestors had been exposed to high levels of radiation and had been forced to work and live in Los Alamos for a wage of $1 per day. The government dismissed the suit because the statute of limitations had expired.

The San Ildefonso Pueblo began campaigning in the 1960s for land donated by them without compensation in 1942 to be returned. In 1996, the U.S. Congress approved legislation to turn over 4,600 acres (1,900 ha) of land from the Los Alamos National Laboratory to the Puebloans. In 2005, San Ildefonso waved its claim to ownership of much of the land within the Los Alamos National Laboratory in exchange for $7 million and the opportunity to acquire land from the Santa Fe National Forest.

== In fiction ==
2023 historical fiction and non-fiction film Oppenheimer shows the title character selecting the site based on personal familiarity with the area from childhood, centrality between the other sites of the Manhattan Project, and remoteness. After the atomic bombings of Hiroshima and Nagasaki, Oppenheimer argues to President Truman that the site should be returned to the previous owners; but as the nuclear arms race is escalating, there is only more demand for the laboratory's research and development capabilities.
