= Valles Caldera =

Volcanic caldera in New Mexico, United States

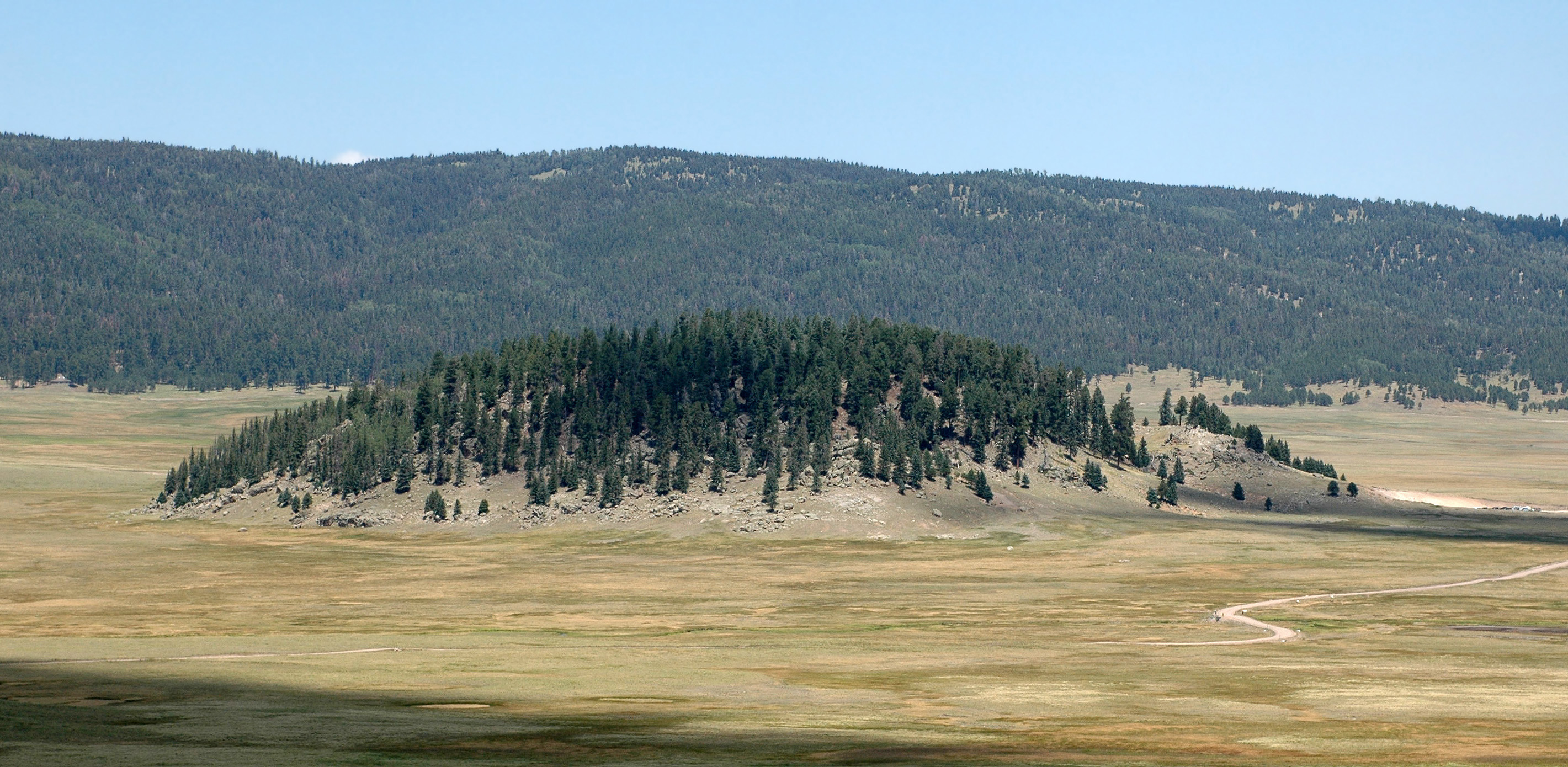
- Cerro la Jara, an approximately 246-foot (75 m) high forested rhyolite lava dome within the caldera

Highest point
- Elevation: 11,253 ft (3,430 m)
- Coordinates: 35°54′N 106°32′W

Geography
- Location within New Mexico
- Location: Sandoval County, New Mexico, U.S.
- Parent range: Jemez Mountains

Geology
- Mountain type: Complex Caldera
- Volcanic zone: Jemez Lineament and Rio Grande Rift
- Last eruption: 68,900 ± 1,000 years BP

Climbing
- Easiest route: New Mexico State Road 4

U.S. National Natural Landmark
- Designated: 1975

Valles Caldera National Preserve
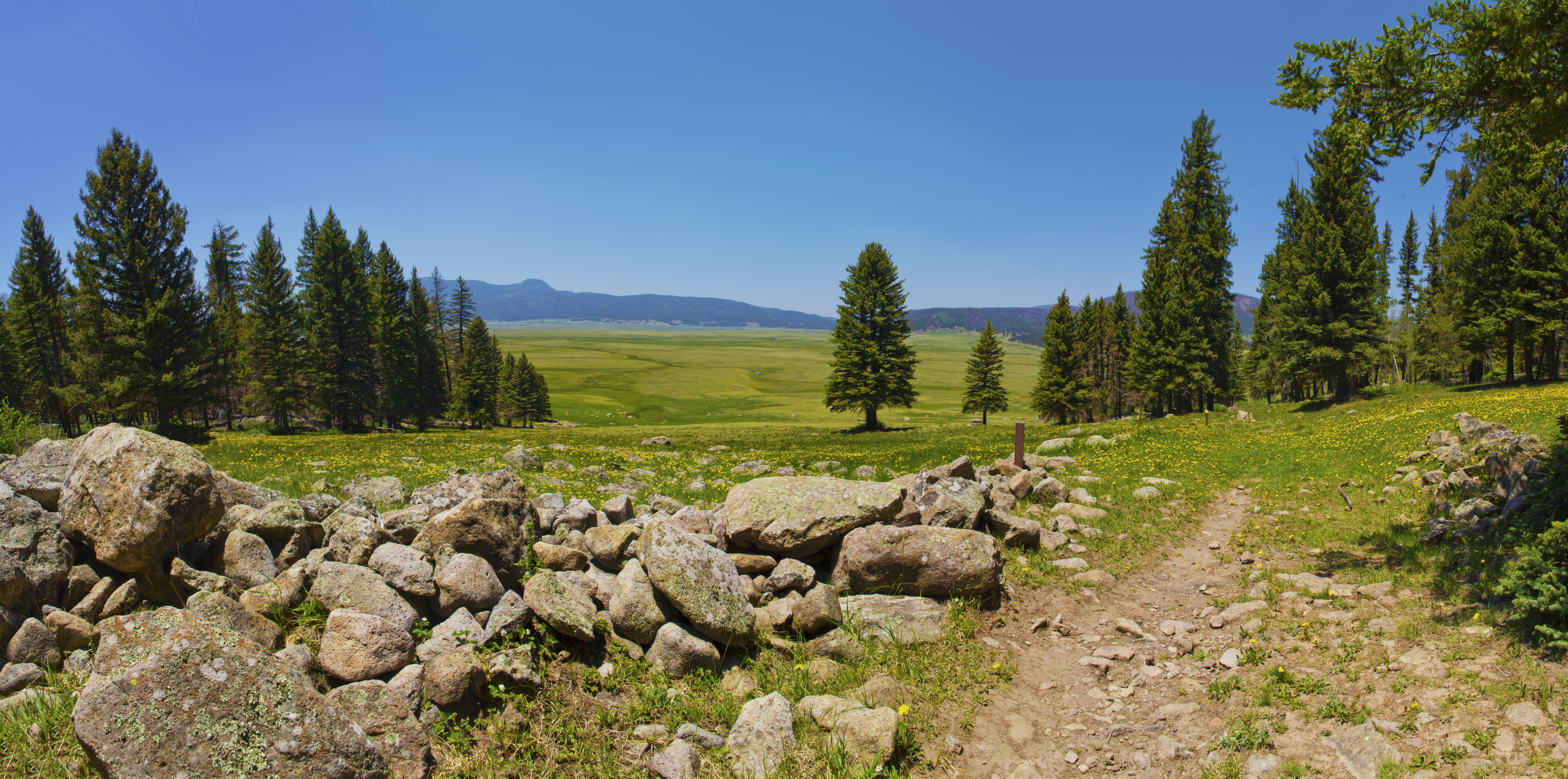
- Valles Caldera
- Interactive map of Valles Caldera National Preserve
- Location: Sandoval and Rio Arriba counties, New Mexico, United States
- Nearest city: Los Alamos, New Mexico
- Coordinates: 35.9°N 106.533°W
- Area: 89,766 acres (363.27 km^{2})
- Established: July 25, 2000
- Visitors: 84,952 (in 2025)
- Governing body: National Park Service
- Website: Valles Caldera National Preserve

The Valles Caldera (or Jemez Caldera) is a 13.7-mile-wide (22.0 km) volcanic caldera in the Jemez Mountains of northern New Mexico. Hot springs, streams, fumaroles, natural gas seeps, and volcanic domes dot the caldera landscape. The highest point in the caldera is Redondo Peak, an 11,254-foot (3,430 m) resurgent lava dome located entirely within the caldera and surrounded by moat-like flows of rhyolitic solidified lavas. Located within the caldera are several grass valleys, or valles, the largest of which is Valle Grande (locally /ˈvaɪ.eɪ ˈɡrɑːndeɪ/ VY-ay GRAHN-day), the only one accessible by a paved road. In 1975, Valles Caldera was designated as a National Natural Landmark by the National Park Service with much of the caldera being within the Valles Caldera National Preserve, a unit of the National Park System. The area has a varied history involving cultural significance, economic resources, scientific studies, and complex geological setting.

== History ==
Use of Valles Caldera dates back to prehistoric times: spear points dating to 11,000 years ago have been discovered. Several Native American tribes frequented the caldera for hunting prolific game and gathering obsidian that is common in this area. The obsidian was knapped into tools and weapons while wild game was followed and hunted seasonally. Obsidian from the caldera was traded by tribes across much of the Southwest. Eventually, the Spanish, and later Mexican settlers along with the Navajo and other tribes came to the caldera seasonally for grazing livestock. This often resulted in periodic clashes and raids between tribes and cultures. Later, as the United States acquired New Mexico as part of the Treaty of Guadalupe Hidalgo in 1848, the caldera became the backdrop for the Indian wars with the U.S. Army. Around the same time, the caldera and its forests began to be used commercially for ranching and logging.

=== Baca Ranch ===
The caldera became part of the Baca Ranch in 1876. The Bacas were a wealthy family given the land as compensation for the termination of a grant given to their family near Las Vegas, in northeastern New Mexico. The family was given four other parcels by the US Government as well, another one in New Mexico, one in Colorado, and two in Arizona. This area, 100,000 acres (40,000 ha), was called Baca Location Number One or Baca Float Number One. Since then, the land has been through a string of exchanges between private owners and business enterprises. It was owned by Frank Bond in the 1930s. Bond, a businessman based in nearby Española, ran up to 30,000 sheep in the caldera, significantly overgrazing the land and causing damage from which the watersheds of the landscape are still recovering.

The land was purchased by the Dunigan family from Abilene, Texas in 1963. Pat Dunigan did not obtain the timber rights and the New Mexico Lumber Company logged the property heavily - removing significant amounts of old-growth douglas fir and ponderosa pine. Dunigan bought out the timber rights in the 1970s and slowed the logging. He negotiated unsuccessfully with the National Park Service and the US Forest Service for possible sale of the property in the 1980s.

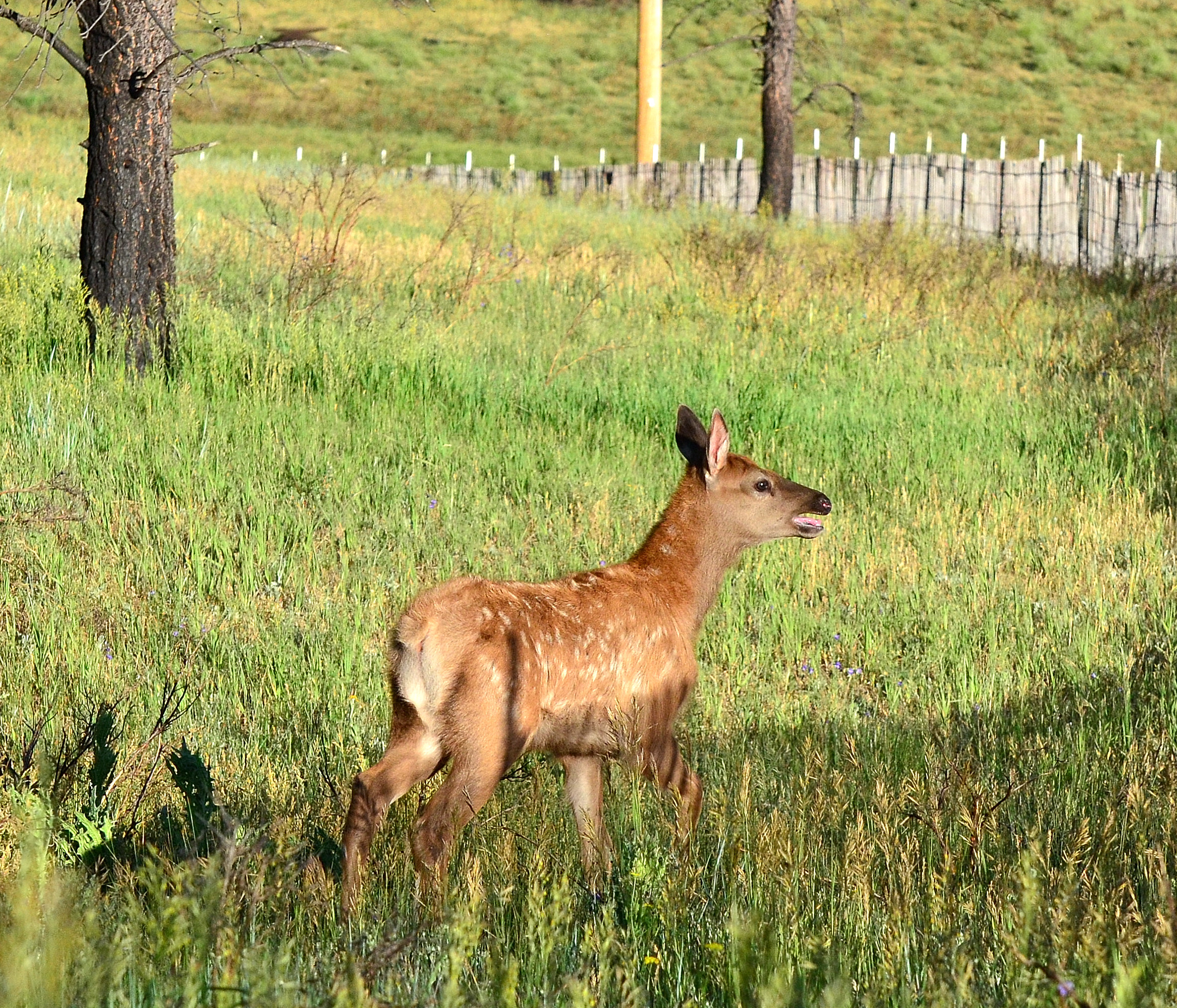
Elk Calf in the Valle Grande, 2012

=== Valles Caldera National Preserve ===
The Valles Caldera Preservation Act of 2000 signed by President Clinton on July 25, 2000, created the Valles Caldera National Preserve (VCNP). The legislation provided for the federal purchase of this historical ranch with funds coming from the Land and Water Conservation Fund derived from royalties the US government receives from offshore petroleum and natural gas drilling. The Dunigan family sold the entire surface estate of 95,000 acres (380 km^{2}) and seven-eighths of the geothermal mineral estate to the federal government for $101 million. As some sites of the Baca Ranch are sacred and of cultural significance to the Native Americans, 5,000 acres (20 km^{2}) of the purchase were given to the Santa Clara Pueblo, which borders the property to the northeast. These include the headwaters of Santa Clara Creek, which is sacred to the pueblo. On the southwest corner of the land, 300 acres (1.2 km^{2}) were to be ceded to Bandelier National Monument.

The Baca Ranch, also known as Baca Location No. 1, had possessed a mixed range of tree species and significant biodiversity. At the time of the purchase, the ranch was home to 40 miles (64 km) of pristine trout streams, 66,118 acres (26,757 ha) of conifer forest, 17 endangered plant and animal species, and 25,000 acres (10,000 ha) of grassland grazed by 8,000 elk, New Mexico's largest herd. The preserve is encircled by federal lands, including the Santa Fe National Forest, the Jemez National Recreation Area, and Bandelier National Monument.

The Valles Caldera Preservation Act of 2000 also created the Valles Caldera Trust, an experimental management organization consisting of nine board members, including seven appointed by the President of the United States. The Trust combined private-sector practices with federal land management protocol. Under the terms of the Valles Caldera Preservation Act, the preserve was to become financially self-sustaining by 2015.

Environmentalists lobbied for the more inclusive protections of national park status instead of the Trust model, but then-Senator Pete Domenici (R) insisted on the experimental approach as a condition for his support for public purchase. Beginning in 2010, US Senator Jeff Bingaman (D) introduced legislation that would transfer the property to the National Park Service as a national preserve. The 2011 bill was supported by the VCNP trustees and a majority of New Mexico's Congressional delegation. On December 19, 2014, President Barack Obama signed the 2015 National Defense Authorization Act, which transferred administrative jurisdiction of the preserve from the Valles Caldera Trust to the National Park Service. After a brief transition period, the National Park Service assumed day-to-day management on October 1, 2015. On October 10, the preserve held an official dedication with dignitaries including U.S. Secretary of the Interior Sally Jewell, U.S. Senator Tom Udall, U.S. Senator Martin Heinrich, former U.S. Senator Jeff Bingaman, National Park Service Intermountain Region Director Sue Masica, and the first National Park Service Superintendent of Valles Caldera National Preserve, Jorge Silva-Bañuelos.

On July 25, 2025, the Valles Caldera National Preserve opened their new Volcano Discovery Center. Superintendent Jorge Silva-Bañuelos cut the opening ribbon. Visitors can interact with a 12-foot topographic relief map at the center of an exhibit designed by local New Mexico company, Ideum. Guests can also explore detailed park maps, read FAQ's, check real-time alerts, access a live seismograph feed, digital docents, and review stories collected from the four themes: Geology, Ecology, Cultural History, and Scientific on interactive touchscreens.

=== Las Conchas Fire ===
In July 2011, the Las Conchas Fire, started by a power line on nearby private land, burned 30,000 acres (120 km^{2}) of the Valles Caldera National Preserve. The wildfire burned a total of 156,000 acres (630 km^{2}) in the Jemez Mountains, including most of neighboring Bandelier National Monument. The Jemez Mountains and surrounding areas of the southwest incorporate dry climates, grasslands, and certain tree species (like Pinon) that evolved to exist with wildfires. Changes in climate and anthropogenic interference with the fire cycle and habitats, has led to fires that are hotter and more intense. These types of fires are more difficult for ecosystems to recover from.

== Geoscience ==
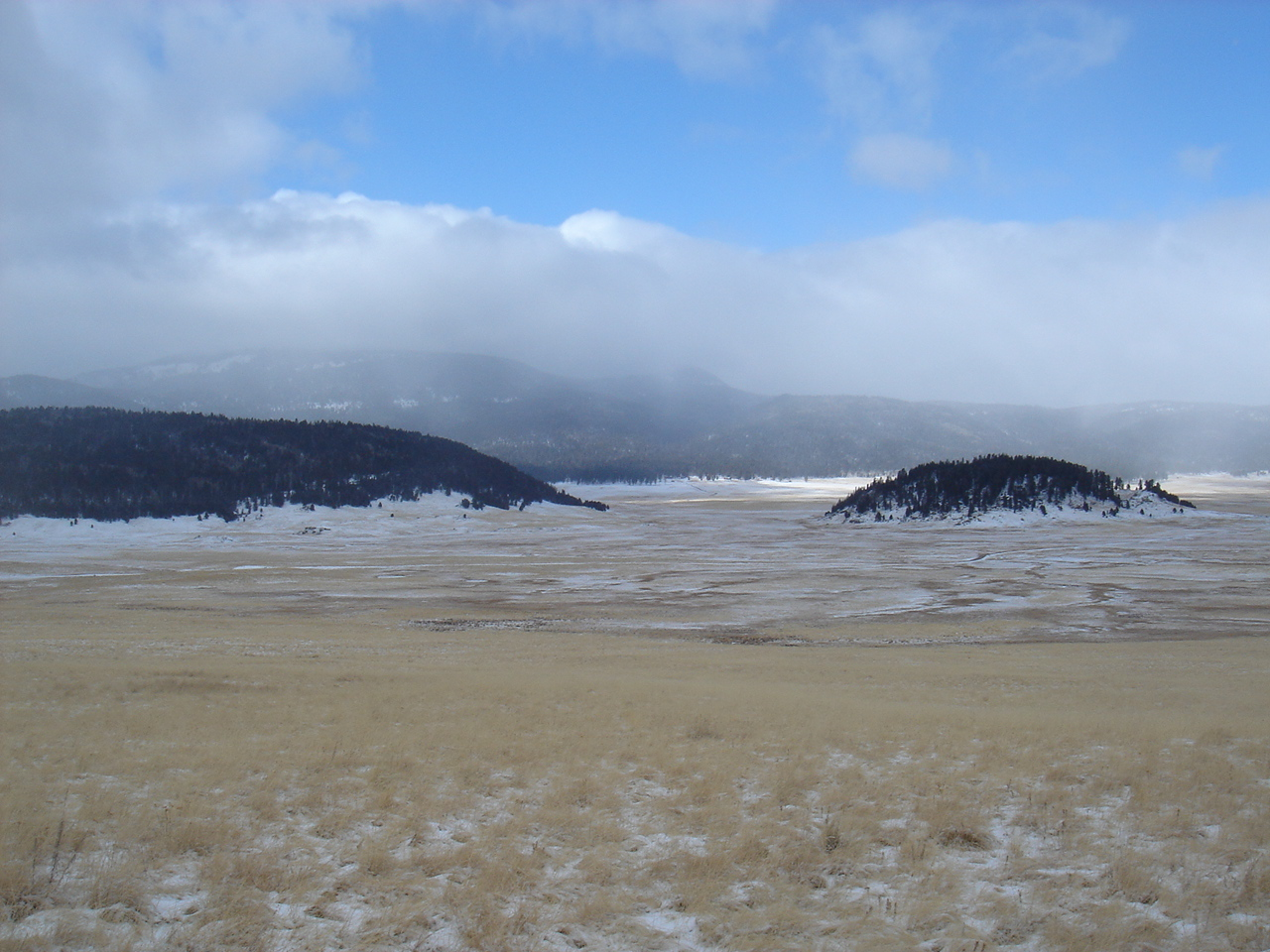
Cerro la Jara (right) in Valle Grande in winter

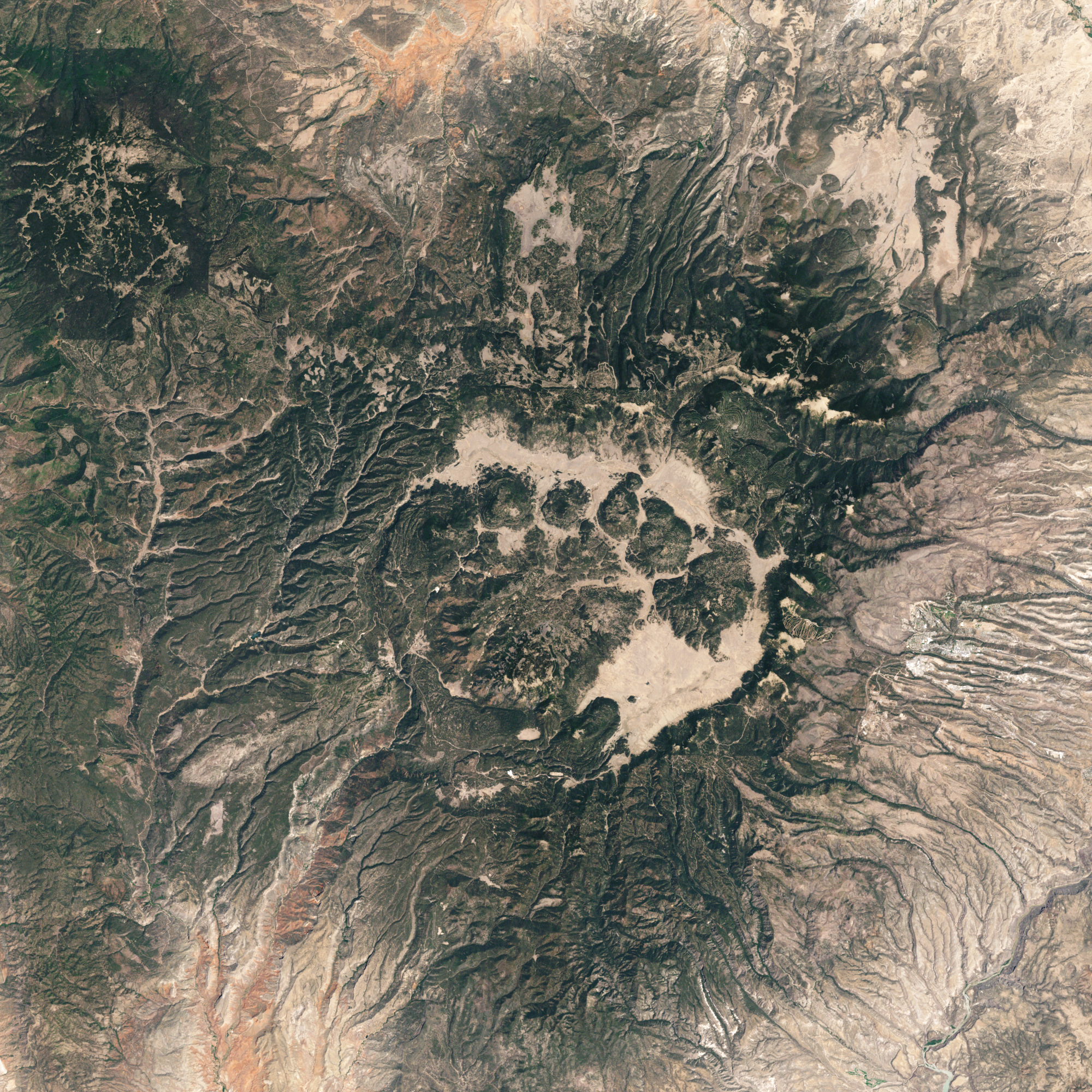
Satellite image of Valles Caldera

The circular topographic rim of the caldera measures 13.7 miles (22.0 km) in diameter. The caldera and surrounding volcanic structures are one of the most thoroughly studied caldera complexes in the United States. Research studies have focused on the fundamental processes of magmatism, hydrothermal systems, ore deposition, and glassy rhyolites. Nearly 40 deep cores have been examined, resulting in extensive subsurface data and geothermal information.

Valles Caldera is the younger of two calderas known at this location, having collapsed over and buried the older Toledo Caldera, which in turn may have collapsed over yet older calderas. The associated Cerros del Rio volcanic field, which forms the eastern Pajarito Plateau and the Caja del Rio, is older than the Toledo Caldera. The Toledo and Valles Calderas formed during eruptions 1.61 million and 1.25 million years ago, respectively. The caldera-forming Toledo eruption emplaced the Otowi member of the Bandelier Tuff 1.61 million years ago, which can be seen along canyon walls west of Valles Caldera, including San Diego Canyon. The younger Tshirege Member of the Bandelier Tuff was formed during the Valles Caldera eruption 1.23 million years ago. The now eroded and exposed orange-tan, light-colored Bandelier Tuff from these events creates the stunning mesas of the Pajarito Plateau.

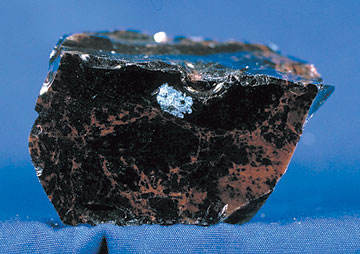
Obsidian with a conchoidal fracture, some weathering, and rust-red coloring. Obsidian is volcanic glass; often black and opaque.

Caldera is the type locality for a resurgent dome caldera, the formation of which was first developed by C.S. Ross, R.L. Smith, and R.A. Bailey during field work at Valles in the 1960s. This type locality and associated studies have been used to study other resurgent domes around the world, including Yellowstone Caldera. After the initial caldera-forming eruption at Valles, the Redondo Peak resurgent dome was uplifted beginning around 1.2 million years ago. Minor eruptions of moat rhyolitic flows occurred from approximately 1.16 million years ago at Cerro del Medio to 0.07 million years ago at Banco Bonito, along a structural ring fracture zone. The El Cajete Pumice and Battleship Rock Ignimbrite were emplaced in a single eruptive event 74,200 ± 1,100 years ago, followed by the eruption of the Banco Bonito obsidian flow during the youngest eruption of Valles Caldera, at 68,900 ± 1,000 years ago. The caldera and surrounding area continue to be shaped by ongoing volcanic activity. Seismic investigations show that a low-velocity zone lies beneath the caldera, suggesting the presence of partial melt within a remaining magma chamber at between 5 and 15 km depth. An active geothermal system with hot springs and fumaroles exists today. These calderas and associated volcanic structures lie within the Jemez Volcanic Field. This volcanic field lies at the intersection of the Rio Grande Rift, which runs north–south through New Mexico, and the Jemez Lineament, which extends from southeastern Arizona northeast to western Oklahoma. The volcanic activity here is related to the tectonic movements of this intersection.

NASA used the caldera in October to November 1964 and again in September 1966 to geologically train the Apollo Astronauts in recognizing volcanic features, such as ash flow tuffs, pumice air falls, and rhyolite domes. Notable geologist instructors included Roy Bailey.

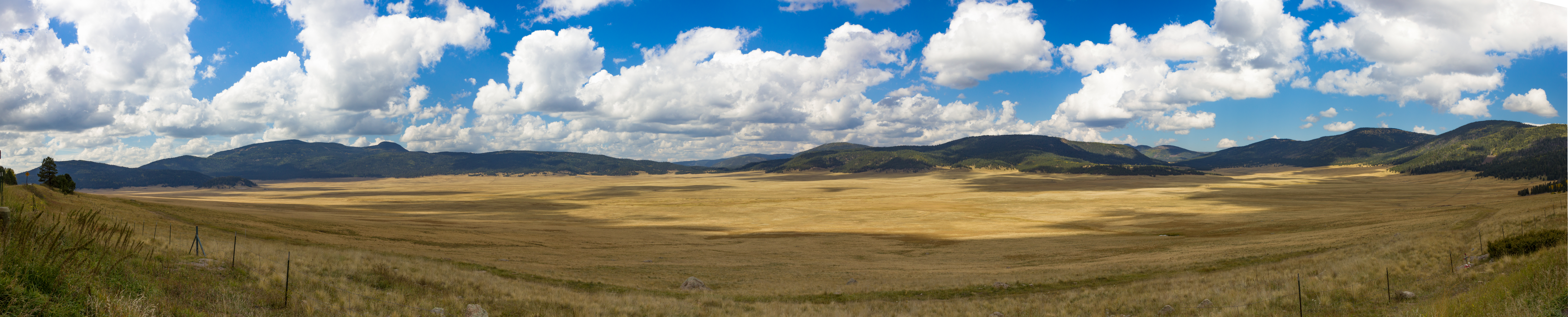
Panoramic view of the Valles Caldera, from the south east rim; in the distance Redondo Peak (a resurgent dome) and the rhyolite lava dome of Cerro la Jara are visible on the far left.

=== Climate ===
According to the Köppen climate classification, Valles Caldera has a subarctic climate (Dfc), with cold winters and mild summers. The caldera is subject to strong temperature inversions, causing very cold nights year round and high diurnal temperature variation.

Climate data for Los Alamos 13 W, New Mexico, 1991–2020 normals: 8716ft (2657m)
Month	Jan	Feb	Mar	Apr	May	Jun	Jul	Aug	Sep	Oct	Nov	Dec	Year
Record high °F (°C)	57 (14)	56 (13)	65 (18)	72 (22)	77 (25)	88 (31)	88 (31)	84 (29)	82 (28)	74 (23)	67 (19)	59 (15)	88 (31)
Mean maximum °F (°C)	48.8 (9.3)	49.6 (9.8)	58.8 (14.9)	65.2 (18.4)	71.9 (22.2)	81.3 (27.4)	80.9 (27.2)	77.1 (25.1)	74.2 (23.4)	68.1 (20.1)	61.2 (16.2)	52.7 (11.5)	82.3 (27.9)
Mean daily maximum °F (°C)	36.2 (2.3)	38.2 (3.4)	44.5 (6.9)	52.4 (11.3)	62.0 (16.7)	71.7 (22.1)	73.7 (23.2)	71.1 (21.7)	65.7 (18.7)	56.5 (13.6)	45.5 (7.5)	36.4 (2.4)	54.5 (12.5)
Daily mean °F (°C)	22.5 (−5.3)	25.2 (−3.8)	32.0 (0.0)	38.9 (3.8)	46.9 (8.3)	55.6 (13.1)	59.3 (15.2)	57.2 (14.0)	50.6 (10.3)	41.4 (5.2)	31.2 (−0.4)	22.7 (−5.2)	40.3 (4.6)
Mean daily minimum °F (°C)	8.7 (−12.9)	12.1 (−11.1)	19.5 (−6.9)	25.4 (−3.7)	31.8 (−0.1)	39.4 (4.1)	45.0 (7.2)	43.3 (6.3)	35.5 (1.9)	26.4 (−3.1)	16.9 (−8.4)	9.0 (−12.8)	26.1 (−3.3)
Mean minimum °F (°C)	−12.6 (−24.8)	−8.5 (−22.5)	0.9 (−17.3)	10.1 (−12.2)	19.2 (−7.1)	29.1 (−1.6)	37.2 (2.9)	35.2 (1.8)	25.4 (−3.7)	13.1 (−10.5)	−0.5 (−18.1)	−12.6 (−24.8)	−18.4 (−28.0)
Record low °F (°C)	−24 (−31)	−26 (−32)	−14 (−26)	2 (−17)	10 (−12)	22 (−6)	32 (0)	30 (−1)	19 (−7)	−2 (−19)	−9 (−23)	−26 (−32)	−26 (−32)
Average precipitation inches (mm)	1.76 (45)	1.98 (50)	2.35 (60)	1.76 (45)	1.39 (35)	1.15 (29)	3.68 (93)	3.66 (93)	2.18 (55)	2.17 (55)	1.63 (41)	1.77 (45)	25.48 (646)
Source 1: NOAA
Source 2: XMACIS2 (records & monthly max/mins)

Climate data for Wolfcanyon, New Mexico, 1991–2020 normals, 1912–2020 extremes: 8220ft (2505m)
Month	Jan	Feb	Mar	Apr	May	Jun	Jul	Aug	Sep	Oct	Nov	Dec	Year
Record high °F (°C)	63 (17)	69 (21)	75 (24)	78 (26)	86 (30)	95 (35)	99 (37)	96 (36)	91 (33)	80 (27)	74 (23)	68 (20)	99 (37)
Mean maximum °F (°C)	50.7 (10.4)	50.8 (10.4)	59.2 (15.1)	66.4 (19.1)	74.4 (23.6)	82.9 (28.3)	83.7 (28.7)	80.2 (26.8)	77.1 (25.1)	69.7 (20.9)	59.7 (15.4)	51.2 (10.7)	85.0 (29.4)
Mean daily maximum °F (°C)	38.2 (3.4)	40.1 (4.5)	47.8 (8.8)	55.8 (13.2)	64.7 (18.2)	75.3 (24.1)	77.0 (25.0)	74.7 (23.7)	69.2 (20.7)	58.8 (14.9)	46.6 (8.1)	38.0 (3.3)	57.2 (14.0)
Daily mean °F (°C)	23.7 (−4.6)	26.4 (−3.1)	33.3 (0.7)	39.9 (4.4)	47.3 (8.5)	56.1 (13.4)	60.4 (15.8)	58.8 (14.9)	52.6 (11.4)	42.8 (6.0)	32.1 (0.1)	24.1 (−4.4)	41.5 (5.3)
Mean daily minimum °F (°C)	9.3 (−12.6)	12.7 (−10.7)	18.8 (−7.3)	24.0 (−4.4)	29.9 (−1.2)	36.9 (2.7)	43.7 (6.5)	42.9 (6.1)	36.1 (2.3)	26.7 (−2.9)	17.6 (−8.0)	10.1 (−12.2)	25.7 (−3.5)
Mean minimum °F (°C)	−9.2 (−22.9)	−6.0 (−21.1)	0.3 (−17.6)	10.8 (−11.8)	19.9 (−6.7)	27.4 (−2.6)	36.0 (2.2)	35.3 (1.8)	24.8 (−4.0)	13.7 (−10.2)	0.2 (−17.7)	−9.3 (−22.9)	−13.6 (−25.3)
Record low °F (°C)	−38 (−39)	−41 (−41)	−26 (−32)	−12 (−24)	5 (−15)	14 (−10)	18 (−8)	22 (−6)	11 (−12)	−2 (−19)	−29 (−34)	−34 (−37)	−41 (−41)
Average precipitation inches (mm)	1.89 (48)	1.67 (42)	1.66 (42)	1.33 (34)	1.15 (29)	0.90 (23)	3.35 (85)	3.35 (85)	2.12 (54)	1.75 (44)	1.51 (38)	1.90 (48)	22.58 (572)
Average snowfall inches (cm)	22.8 (58)	20.1 (51)	16.8 (43)	11.9 (30)	2.2 (5.6)	0.1 (0.25)	0.0 (0.0)	0.0 (0.0)	0.2 (0.51)	3.5 (8.9)	11.4 (29)	22.3 (57)	111.3 (283.26)
Source 1: NOAA
Source 2: XMACIS2 (records & monthly max/mins)

Climate data for Hidden Valley (Valles Caldera), New Mexico (2011–2023): 8,470 ft (2,580 m)
Month	Jan	Feb	Mar	Apr	May	Jun	Jul	Aug	Sep	Oct	Nov	Dec	Year
Record high °F (°C)	59.1 (15.1)	57.9 (14.4)	66.6 (19.2)	72.9 (22.7)	76.0 (24.4)	90.0 (32.2)	85.0 (29.4)	82.5 (28.1)	83.2 (28.4)	74.8 (23.8)	68.0 (20.0)	64.2 (17.9)	90.0 (32.2)
Mean daily maximum °F (°C)	37.9 (3.3)	40.4 (4.7)	48.0 (8.9)	54.5 (12.5)	62.5 (16.9)	74.9 (23.8)	75.5 (24.2)	73.6 (23.1)	69.1 (20.6)	58.2 (14.6)	48.5 (9.2)	38.2 (3.4)	56.8 (13.8)
Daily mean °F (°C)	16.4 (−8.7)	22.4 (−5.3)	31.8 (−0.1)	38.9 (3.8)	45.7 (7.6)	55.7 (13.2)	58.3 (14.6)	55.6 (13.1)	49.5 (9.7)	37.7 (3.2)	27.4 (−2.6)	18.3 (−7.6)	38.1 (3.4)
Mean daily minimum °F (°C)	−3.5 (−19.7)	2.3 (−16.5)	13.6 (−10.2)	18.9 (−7.3)	22.7 (−5.2)	29.6 (−1.3)	39.2 (4.0)	37.0 (2.8)	29.5 (−1.4)	17.3 (−8.2)	8.4 (−13.1)	−1.1 (−18.4)	17.8 (−7.9)
Record low °F (°C)	−39.6 (−39.8)	−39.0 (−39.4)	−23.1 (−30.6)	−2.3 (−19.1)	−1.1 (−18.4)	8.4 (−13.1)	20.7 (−6.3)	20.9 (−6.2)	7.7 (−13.5)	−14.7 (−25.9)	−19.9 (−28.8)	−39.6 (−39.8)	−39.6 (−39.8)
Average precipitation inches (mm)	1.13 (29)	0.71 (18)	2.10 (53)	0.63 (16)	0.91 (23)	1.07 (27)	4.01 (102)	2.61 (66)	2.50 (64)	2.08 (53)	1.16 (29)	0.91 (23)	19.82 (503)
Average precipitation days (≥ 0.01 in)	8.9	7.7	9.9	7.7	8.1	5.8	16.1	14.7	10.6	9.1	9.1	7.7	115.4
Source: WRCC

== Geothermal energy exploration ==
The volcanic properties of Valles Caldera make it a likely source for renewable geothermal energy. Some people oppose the development of geothermal energy, considering it destructive to the scenic beauty, recreational and grazing use. Its impact on the hot springs and supplying aquifers is unknown as experiences from other past geothermal projects proved that production of reservoir fluids had dramatic impacts to the surface thermal features.

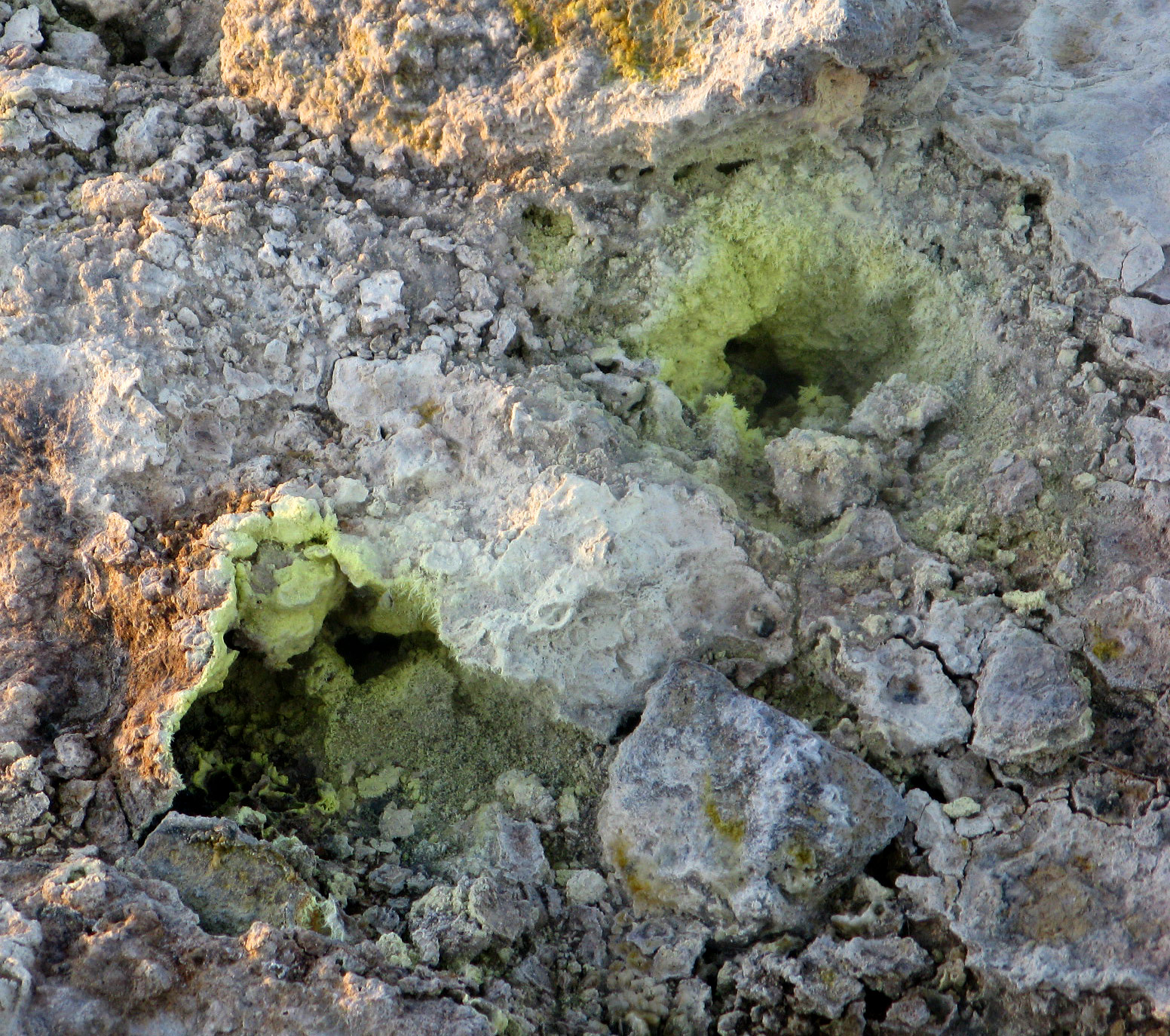
Sulphur fumaroles like these, found in Iceland, are often seen with such volcanic features and are related to the geothermal/geochemistry profile of the magma body.

Valles Caldera was home to the first experiments into development of an Enhanced geothermal system (EGS) or Hot-dry-rock (HDR) geothermal system, beginning in 1974 by the Los Alamos National Laboratory at the Fenton Hill reservoir, approximately 3 km west of Valles Caldera. Originally, the Fenton Hill site was chosen as an EGS laboratory in hopes that the proximity to Valles Caldera would increase the temperature of the bedrock, thus requiring shallower drill depths. The abundance of hydrothermal fluids discharged from the nearby caldera resulted in hydrothermal alteration of the rocks at depth, weakening the sealed nature of the reservoir. The Fenton Hill HDR experiment was finally abandoned in 1998. The experiments demonstrated that a potential EGS reservoir must be characterized by low permeability, crystalline basement rock with no active faults or joints.

From 1959 to 1983, approximately 40 exploratory geothermal wells were drilled into the Redondo Creek Graben as part of the Baca geothermal field, a joint operation by the United States Department of Energy and the Union Oil Company of California. Despite measuring a maximum temperature of 342 °C and having a likely production capacity of 20 MWe, the geothermal field was too small to be economic. Three scientific cores were drilled in Valles Caldera during the mid-1980s as part of the United States Continental Scientific Drilling Program in order to analyze the chemistry of geothermal fluids and the presence of a vapor-dominated cap in the Sulphur Springs region. The maximum bottom hole temperature measured during drilling was 295 °C. Overall, the geothermal reservoir at Valles Caldera is liquid-dominated rather than vapor-dominated and has a neutral-chloride fluid chemistry with a maximum temperature below 300 °C.

== Recreation ==
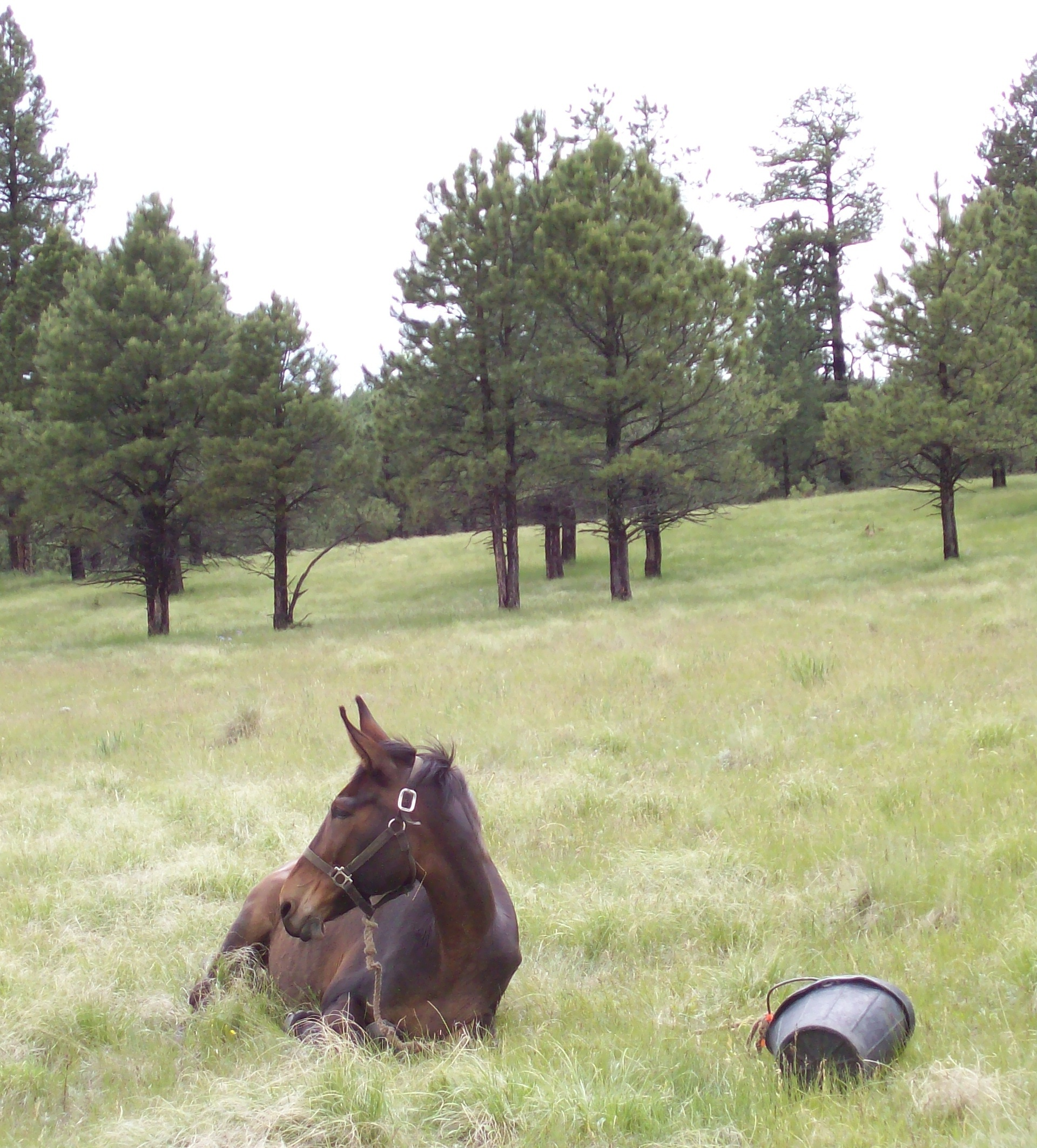
A mule resting in Valle Jaramillo during an endurance race; trees in the background lack lower branches due to browsing.

A number of recreational and/or historical uses take place in Valles Caldera. Many of these uses involve trails. Over two dozen official hiking and biking trails of varying length are available. Maps and trail descriptions may be found in "Hiking Trails in Valles Caldera National Preserve," by Coco Rae. Valles Caldera has many miles of ranch roads, livestock and game trails. These include a network of trails currently designated for horse riding. Historically, Valles Caldera was a location for equestrian endurance races. After establishment of VCNP, the first race in the caldera was held in 2009. The largest grass valley, Valle Grande, is a venue for ski orienteering. Activities are open to the public, though some require reservations. Customer service and concierge services are provided by the Public Lands Interpretive Association. The valley floor is above 8,000 ft (2,400 m) altitude.

== Wildlife and livestock ==
Throughout the caldera, the grass valleys appear groomed: there are few saplings and mature trees lack lower branches. This is due to heavy browsing by elk and cattle and because of frequent grass fires of human and natural origin which kill the lower branches on the Engelmann spruce, Douglas-fir and Ponderosa pine that populate the uplands around the lower-elevation Montane grasslands dominating the bottoms of the calderas. The grasslands were native perennial bunch grass maintained by frequent fire before sheep and cattle grazing. Although the grass appears abundant, it is a limited resource and its growing season is short. Through the VCNP's limited grazing program, it feeds hundreds of cattle in the summer and thousands more of elk in the warm seasons, in drought winters, and during most of the year. The nutritional value of the bunch grasses is considered low or poor quality. Other wildlife that inhabits the area are Golden Eagles, striped Badgers, and the Gunnison Prairie Dog, to name a few. The National Park Service states that elk population in Valles Caldera is the second largest herd in New Mexico. Hunting is permitted within the National Preserve under certain restrictions and times of the year.

== In popular culture ==
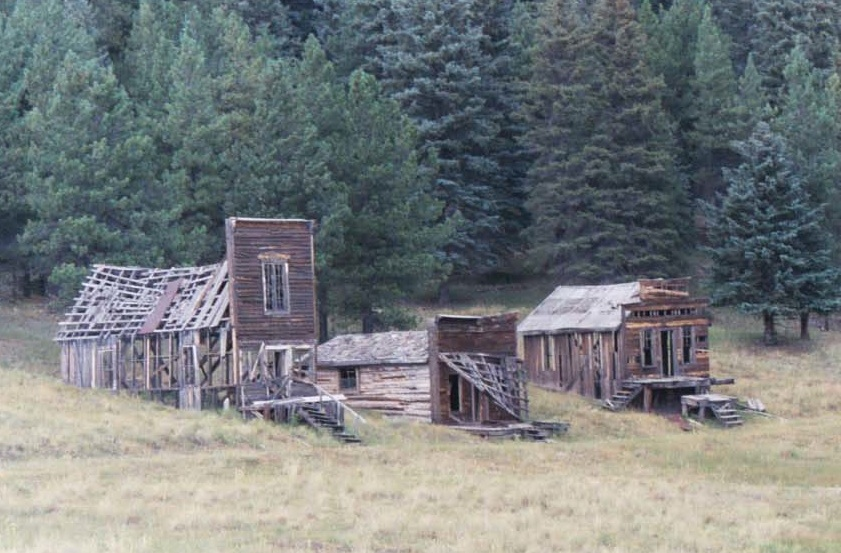
Exterior "town" set in Valle Grande

Valles Caldera has provided several filming locations, most for films in the Western genre. Some of these locations include exterior sets, such as the weathered "ranch house" that can be seen from the highway in Valle Grande, and a small "town".

- 1971 Shoot Out
- 1977 Peter Lundy and the Medicine Hat Stallion (TV)
- 1982 The Gambler (TV)
- 1994 Troublemakers
- 1995 Buffalo Girls (TV)
- 1997 Last Stand at Saber River (TV)
- 2003 The Missing
- 2007 Seraphim Falls
- 2010 Kites (film) (Hindi/Indian Film)
- 2013 The Lone Ranger
- 2012–2017 Longmire (TV series)

== See also ==
- Jemez Pueblo, New Mexico
- Valle Vidal
