= Puye Formation =

Geologic formation in New Mexico, USA

- Stratigraphic range: Miocene to Pliocene, 7–4 Ma
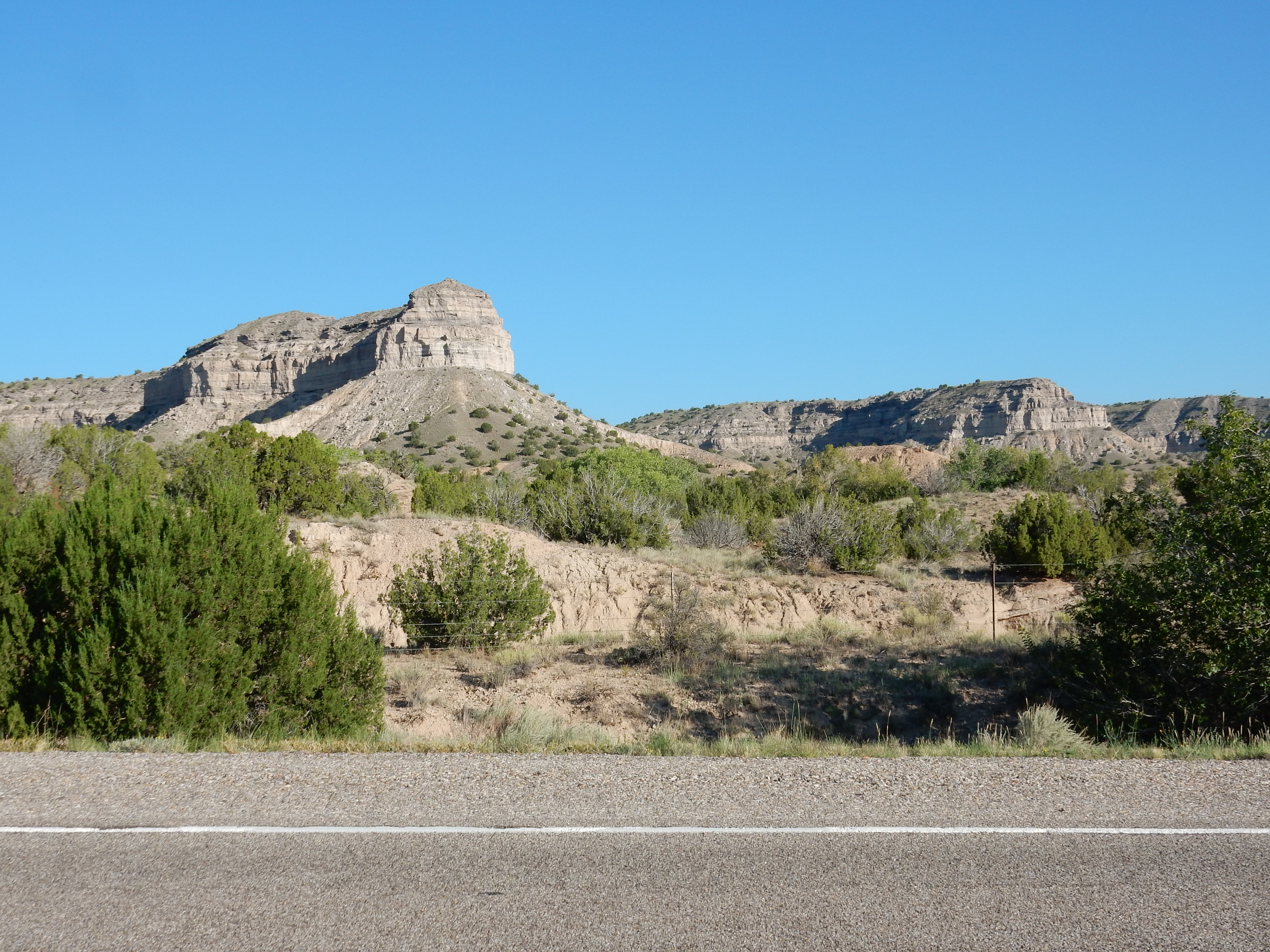
- Puye Formation at its type area, the Puye escarpment, near San Ildefonso Pueblo, New Mexico
- Type: Formation
- Unit of: Santa Fe Group
- Sub-units: Totavi Lentil
- Underlies: Tewa Group
- Overlies: Chamita Formation
- Area: 518 km^{2}
- Thickness: 221 metres (725 feet)

Lithology
- Primary: Volcaniclastic
- Other: Ignimbrite

Location
- Coordinates: 35.8914°N 106.1730°W
- Region: New Mexico
- Country: United States

Type section
- Named for: Puye escarpment
- Named by: H.T.U. Smith
- Year defined: 1938
- Puye Formation (the United States) Puye Formation (New Mexico)

The Puye Formation is a geologic formation exposed east of the Jemez Mountains of northern New Mexico. Radiometric dating constrains its age to between 5 and 2 million years, corresponding to the Pliocene epoch.

== Description ==
The Puye Formation is a fanglomerate containing 25 pyroclastic flows, including pumicious ignimbrites and block and ash flows, erupted by vents of the Tschicoma Formation. It is exposed from the mouth of Ancho Canyon in White Rock Canyon north to Santa Clara Peak, and generally underlies the Bandelier Tuff north and east of the city of Los Alamos, covering an area of 518 square kilometers (200 sq mi). It is best exposed in Guaje Canyon and on the southern end of the Puye escarpment where it is a cliff-forming formation. It is 71 meters (233 ft) thick at the type section but thickens westward towards the Sierra de los Valles, west of Los Alamos. Drilling has found that the formation is up to 221 meters (725 ft) thick.^{1964} The formation was deposited between 7 and 4 million years ago, based on radiometric dating of an ash bed in the upper part of the formation and the absence of Bearhead Rhyolite ash (~7 million years old) in the formation.

The Totavi Lentil is the lowest part of the formation, some 24 meters (79 ft) thick, which consists of pebbles, cobbles, and small boulders of quartzite and granite with only limited volcanic debris, contrasting with the remainder of the formation. This is separated by a significant unconformity from the underlying Chamita Formation. The Totavi Lentil is raised to formation rank by some investigators.

The main body of the Puye Formation consists of fanglomerates in which most of the detritus is volcanic rock of dacitic composition. There are also dacitic tephra beds and some basalt.^{1964} The formation shows cyclicity on the scale of 5 to 30 meters representing individual eruptive pulses in the northeastern Jemez highlands. Each sequence shows marked facies changes with increased distance from the eruptive center. Deposition ceased with reduction in Tschicoma volcanism and basinwide pedimentation due to downcutting of the Rio Grande. The formation is remarkably well preserved for a volcanic fanglomerate, due to its deposition in an active graben associated with Rio Grande Rift.

A notable feature of exposures of the formation is the presence of pedestal rocks.

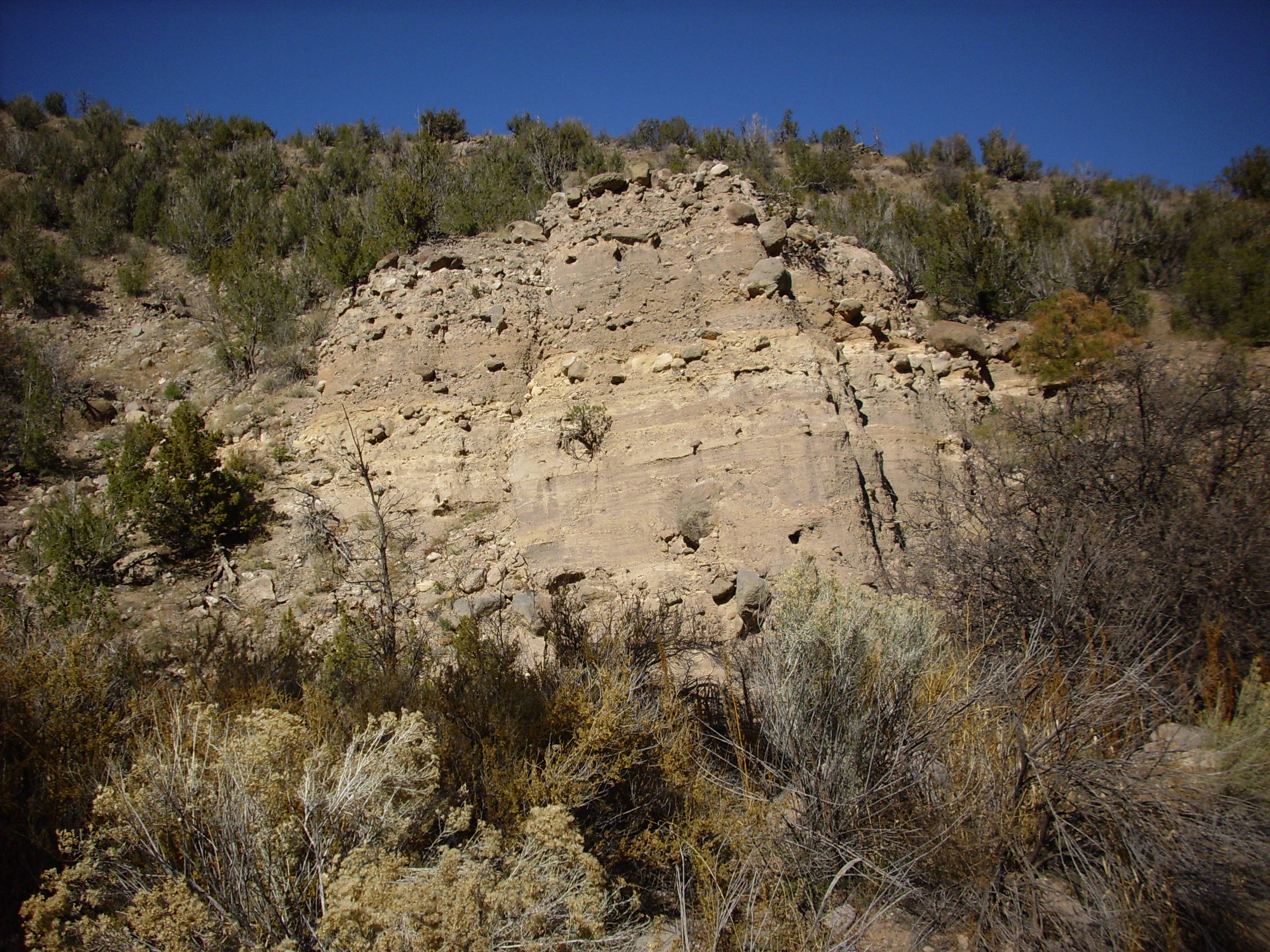
Puye Formation exposures in Rendija Canyon

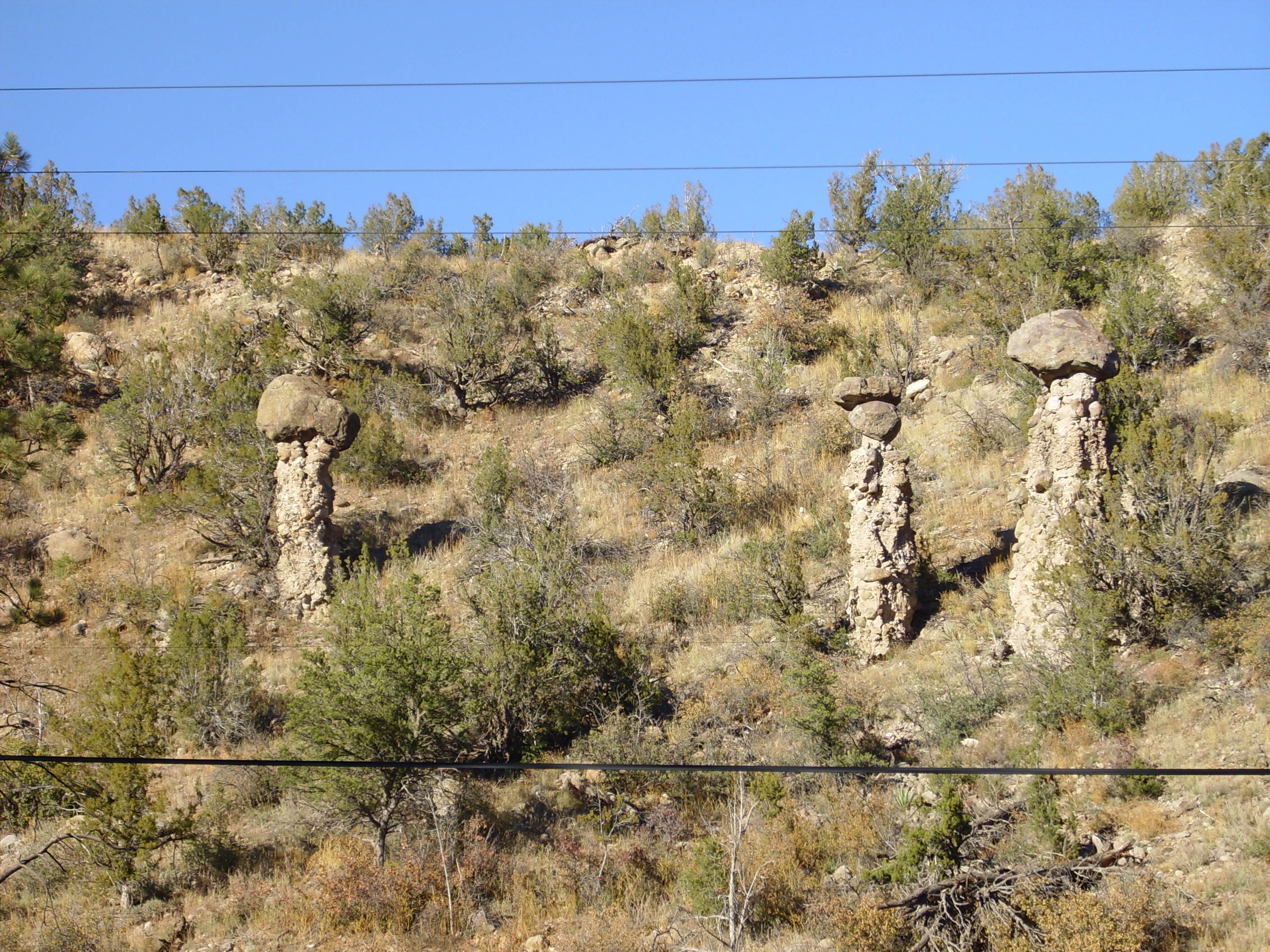
Pedestal rocks in the Puye Formation

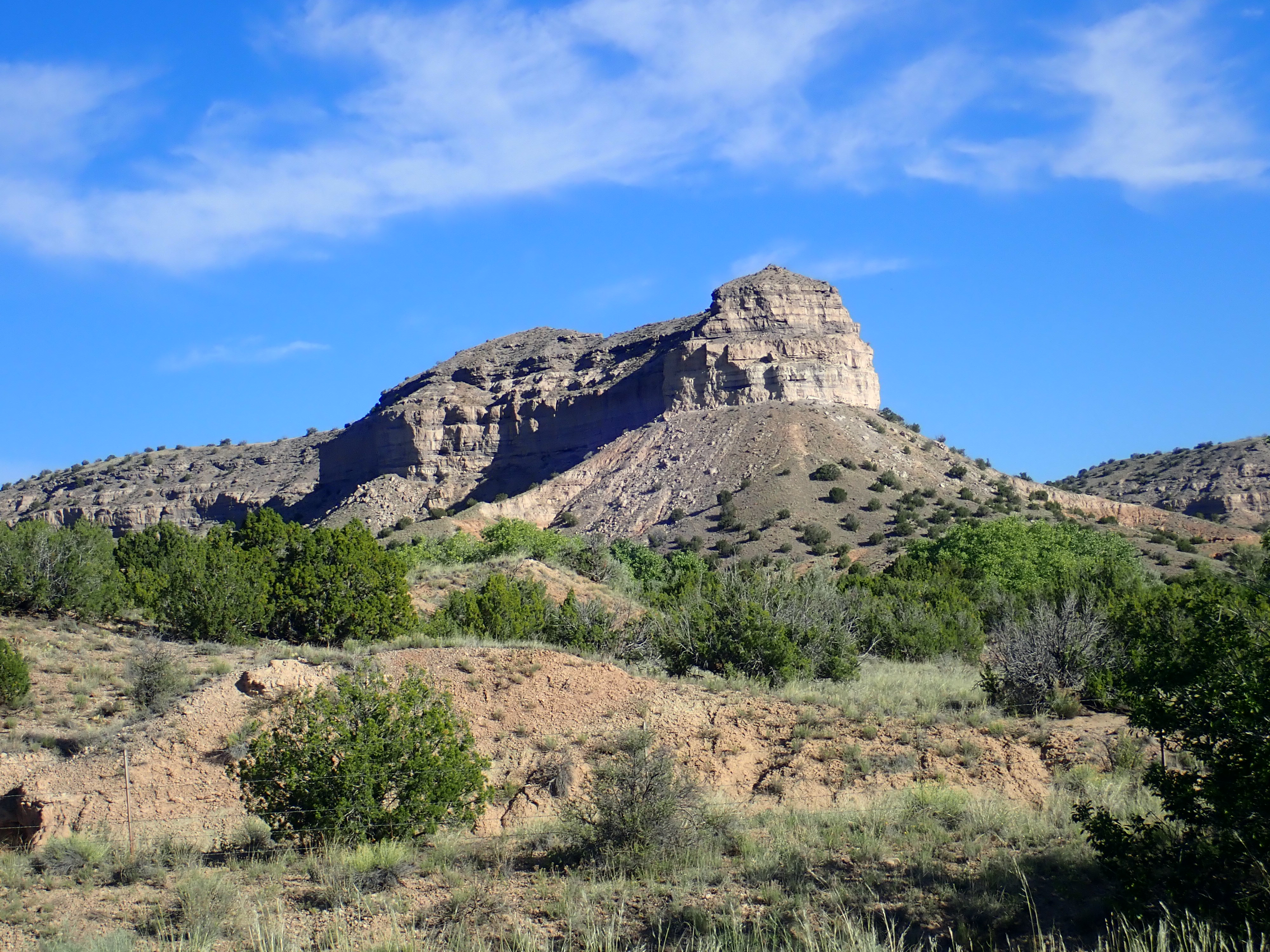
Cliffs of the Puye Formation along the Puye escarpment

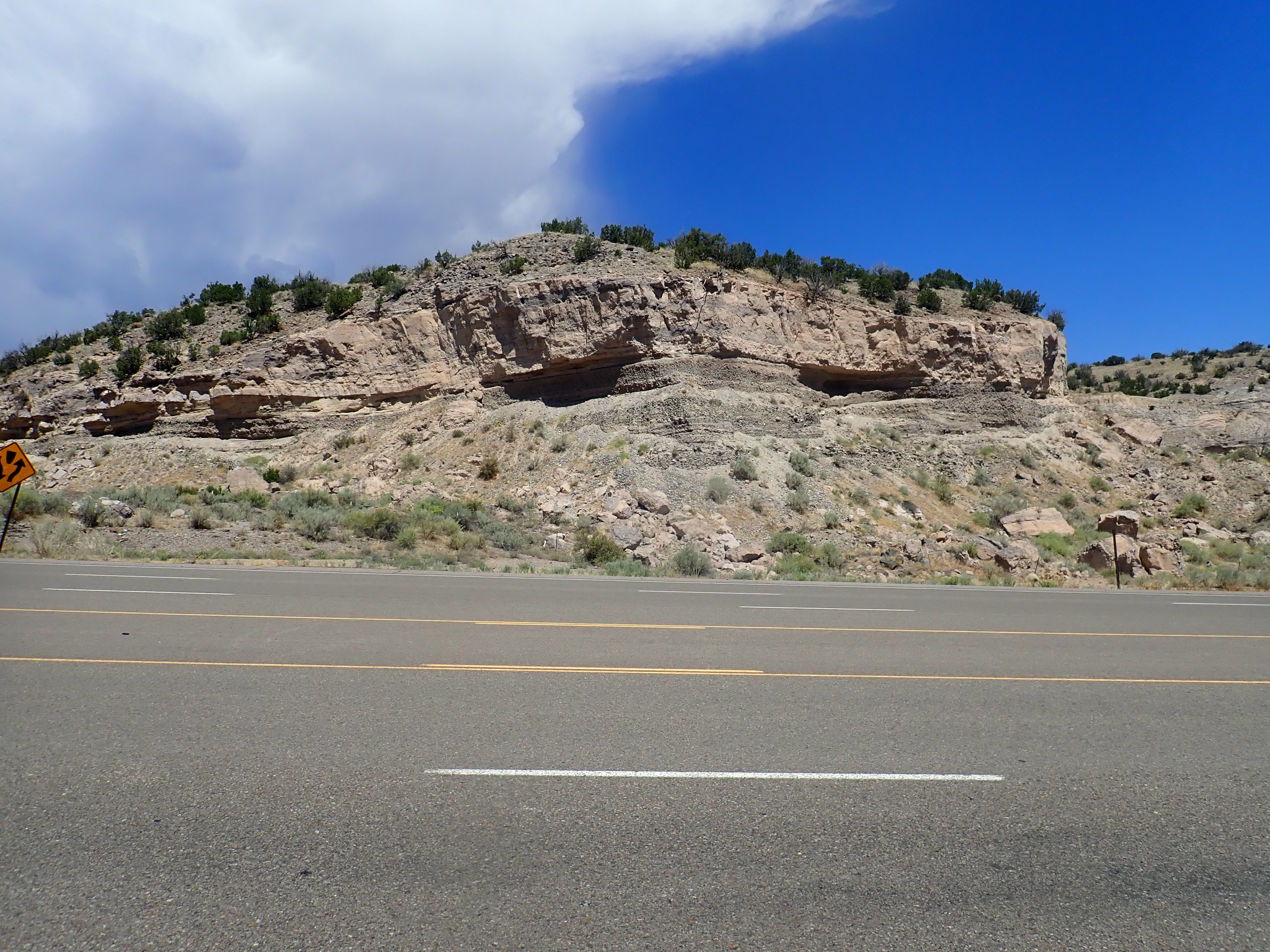
Road cut in Puye Formation, showing gravel beds of the Totavi Lentil near its type section.

== Economic geology ==
The formation is a high-yield aquifer exploited in the Los Alamos area. Use of potassium dichromate in a power plant created an unusually well-characterized source of chromium contamination in this aquifer, which has been studied to understand natural attenuation of such pollutants.

== History of investigation ==
The formation was first named the Puye Gravel by Harold T.U. Smith in his mapping of the Abiquiu quadrangle in 1938. The name was changed to Puye Conglomerate by Roy Griggs in 1964, since the exposures he studied were consolidated enough to stand as cliffs. Griggs also designated a type section and divided the unit into an upper unnamed fanglomerate and a lower Totavi Lentil, named for a nearby settlement. Griggs assigned the formation to the Santa Fe Group.

Because of its diverse lithology, the formation was renamed the Puye Formation by Bailey, Smith, and Ross in 1969 as part of their work establishing the stratigraphy of the Jemez Mountains.

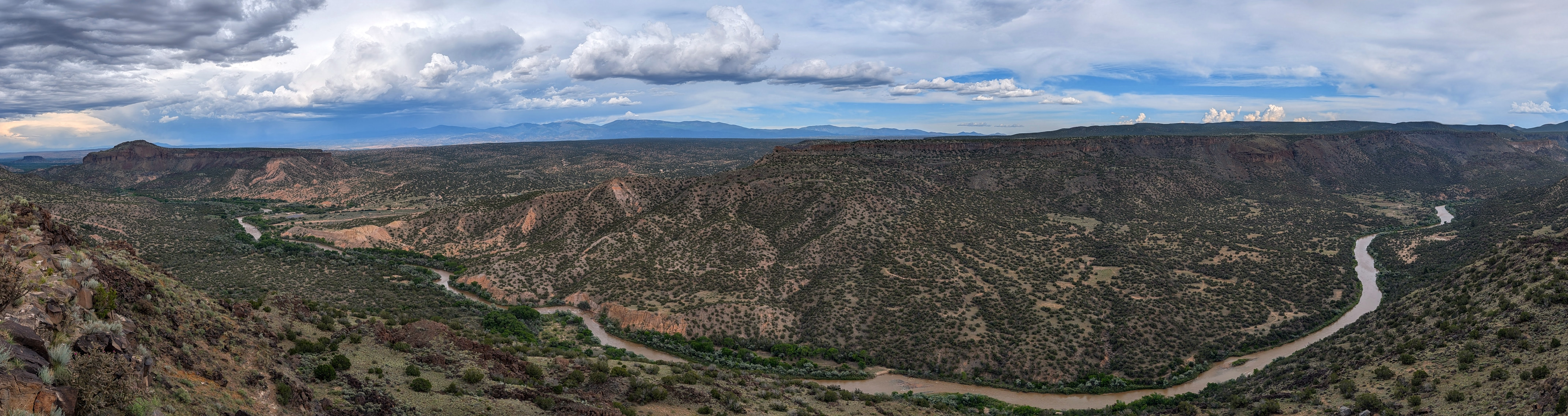
Panoramic view of the Rio Grande from atop the Puye escarpment, at Overlook Park, White Rock, New Mexico
