= Cochiti Formation =

Geologic formation in New Mexico, US

- Stratigraphic range: Miocene to Pliocene, 10–2.6 Ma
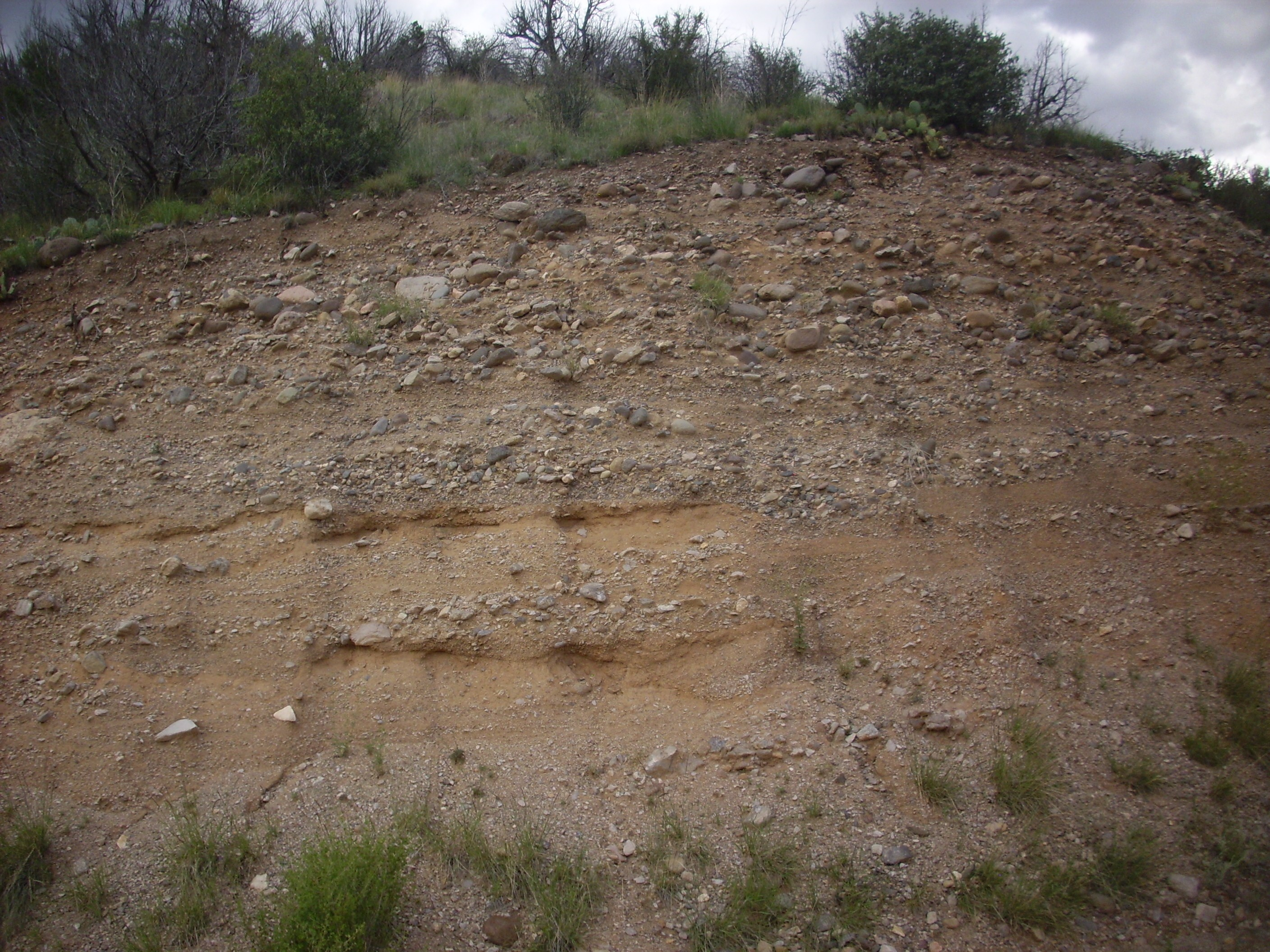
- Cochiti Formation in road cut at Kasha-Katuwe Tent Rocks National Monument
- Type: Formation
- Unit of: Santa Fe Group
- Sub-units: Lookout Park Gravel Member
- Overlies: Keres Group

Lithology
- Primary: Sandstone
- Other: Conglomerate

Location
- Coordinates: 35.673°N 106.453°W
- Region: New Mexico
- Country: United States

Type section
- Named for: Cochiti Pueblo
- Named by: Bailey, Smith, and Ross
- Year defined: 1969
- Cochiti Formation (the United States) Cochiti Formation (New Mexico)

The Cochiti Formation is a geologic formation exposed near the southwest Jemez Mountains of northern New Mexico. Its age is estimated as 10 to 2.6 million years, corresponding to the middle Miocene to Pliocene.

== Description ==
The formation consists of volcaniclastic sand and gravel eroded off exposures of the Keres Group of the southern Jemez Mountains. The formation is restricted to sedimentary strata composed purely of volcaniclastic sediments that overlie Keres Group volcanic rocks and Keres-age volcanic sediments south of the Jemez Mountain, and which in turn are in turn overlain by Pliocene and early Pleistocene gravels.

=== Members ===
The Lookout Park Gravel Member is a stratified cobble to boulder gravel composed almost entirely of Keres Group volcanic debris that underlies high level geomorphic surfaces sloping to the southeast. It is interbedded with basalt with an age of 2.5 million years.

== History of investigation ==
The formation was first defined by Bailey, Smith, and Ross in 1969 as part of their work establishing the stratigraphy of the Jemez Mountains. The formation was named for exposures near Cochiti Pueblo.

Gary A. Smith and Alexis Lavine argued in 1996 that the original definition was inconsistent and that volcanic and sedimentary basin stratigraphers had worsened the problem by their different approaches to regional stratigraphy. For example, Fraser Goff and his coinvestigators mapped volcaniclastic beds of the San Miguel Mountains as Cochiti Formation based on the original definition of the formation, while noting the inconsistency. Smith and Lavine identified a mappable, distinct stratigraphic unit that included most of the original exposures mapped by R.L. Smith, R.A. Bailey, and C.S. Ross in 1970 and excluded most strata added by other investigators.

R.M. Chamberlin and his coinvestigators tentatively assigned the Gravel of Lookout Park as a member of the Cochiti Formation in 1999.
