= Tewa Group =

Group of geologic formations in New Mexico, USA

- Stratigraphic range: Pleistocene, 1.85–0.068 Ma
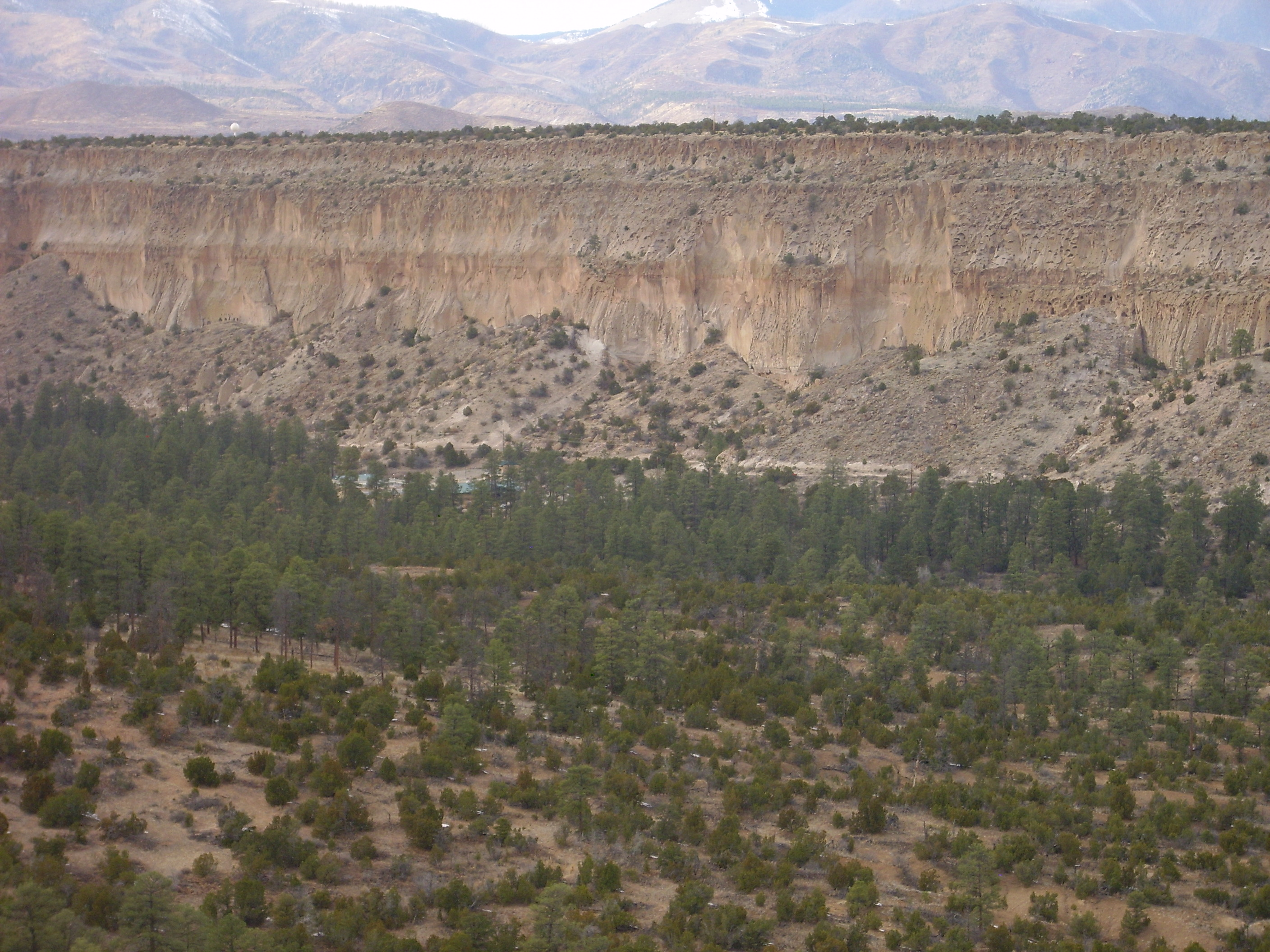
- Kwage Mesa, a finger mesa of the Bandelier Tuff, Tewa Group
- Type: Group
- Sub-units: Bandelier Tuff, Cerro Toledo Formation, Valles Rhyolite
- Overlies: Polvadera Group
- Thickness: 1,050 m (3,440 ft)

Lithology
- Primary: Rhyolite

Location
- Coordinates: 35.764°N 106.322°W
- Region: New Mexico
- Country: United States

Type section
- Named for: Tewa Mountains (obsolete name for Jemez Mountains)
- Named by: R.L. Griggs
- Year defined: 1964
- Tewa Group (the United States) Tewa Group (New Mexico)

The Tewa Group is a group of geologic formations exposed in and around the Jemez Mountains of northern New Mexico. Radiometric dating gives it an age of 1.85 million to 72 thousand years, corresponding to the Pleistocene epoch.

== Geology ==
The Jemez Mountains lie on the intersection of the western margin of the Rio Grande Rift and the Jemez Lineament. Here magma produced from the fertile rock of an ancient subduction zone has repeatedly found its way to the surface along faults produced by rifting. This has produced a long-lived volcanic field, with the earliest eruptions beginning at least 13 million years ago in both the northern (Polvadera Group) and southern (Keres Group) portions of the volcanic field. High-silica eruptions of the Tewa Group began about 1.85 million years ago (Ma) and continued almost to the present day.

The Tewa Group is a sequence of mostly rhyolite pyroclastic flows and domes that underlies much of the Valles Caldera and forms extensive outflow sheets surrounding the caldera. It has a maximum thickness of 1,050 m (3,440 ft). It overlies the Santa Fe, Keres, and Polvadera Groups to the east and south of the caldera and older rocks ranging in age from Paleoproterozoic to Permian to the west and north. It forms the upper surfaces of the Pajarito Plateau east of the caldera and the Jemez Plateau west of the caldera.

There is geochemical evidence that the Tewa Group originated through rejuvenation of intrusions associated with the Paliza Canyon Formation of the Keres Group.

=== Formations ===
From oldest to youngest, the formations recognized within the Tewa Group are the Bandelier Tuff, the Cerro Toledo Formation, and the Valles Rhyolite. However, the Pueblo Canyon Member of the Cerro Toledo Formation was deposited between the Otowi Member and Tsherige Member of the Bandelier Tuff.

The Bandelier Tuff is a sequence of rhyolitic pyroclastic flows erupted in three caldera eruptions, at 1.85 Ma (La Cueva Member), 1.62 Ma (Toledo event; Otowi Member), and 1.25 Ma (Valles event; Tsherige Member). These form a vast outflow sheet surrounding the Jemez Mountains.

The Cerro Toledo Formation consists of rhyolitic domes erupted in the Toledo Embayment, a structural feature in the northeast caldera rim, between the Toledo and Valles events. It also includes ring fracture dome remnants of the Toledo event and mixed pumice and sediment beds separating the Otowi and Tsherige Members (Pueblo Canyon Member). Ages range from 1.54 Ma for the west Los Posos dome to 1.20 Ma at Pinnacle Peak.

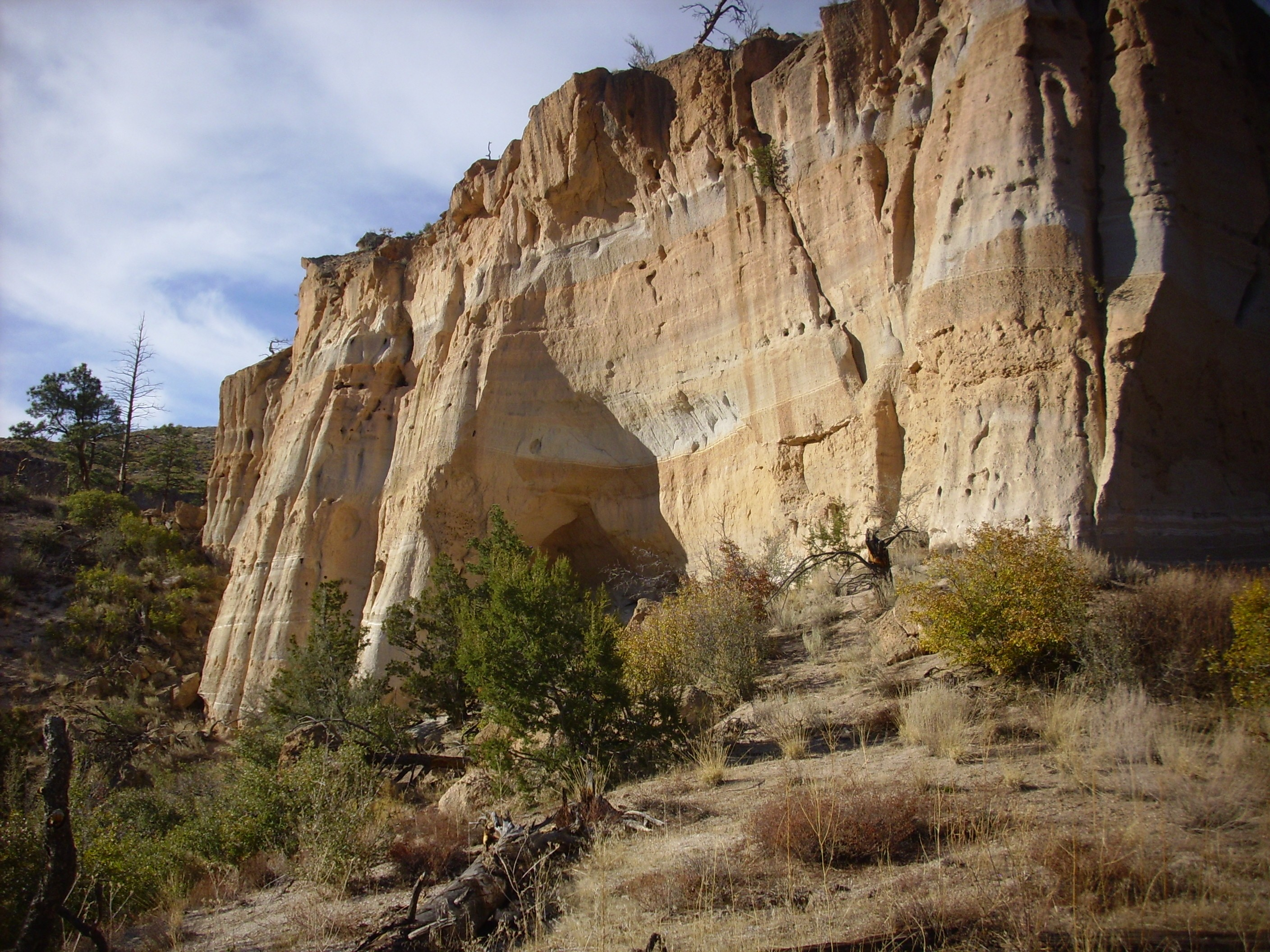
Pueblo Canyon Member north of Los Alamos

The Valles Rhyolite consists of rhyolite domes and flows associated with caldera resurgence and with the ring fracture of the Valles event. It includes the most recent eruptions in the Jemez Mountains, ending with the Banco Bonito flow. The earliest members, the Deer Canyon Member and Redondo Creek Member, are associated with resurgence, with argon-argon ages of 1.23 to 1.28 Ma. The Cerro del Medio Member (1.169-1.229 Ma), Cerros del Abrigo Member (0.973 Ma), Cerro Santa Rosa Member (0.787-0.936 Ma), Cerro San Luis Member (0.800 Ma), Cerro Seco Member (0.800 to 0.77 Ma), San Antonio Mountain Member (0.557 Ma), and South Mountain Member (0.52 to 0.53 Ma) are individual ring fracture dome complexes that show a progression in age counterclockwise along the presumed ring fracture of the Valles caldera. The El Cajete, Battleship Rock, and Banco Bonito flows are the youngest flows in the Jemez volcanic field, erupting from 77.4 to 68.3 ka.

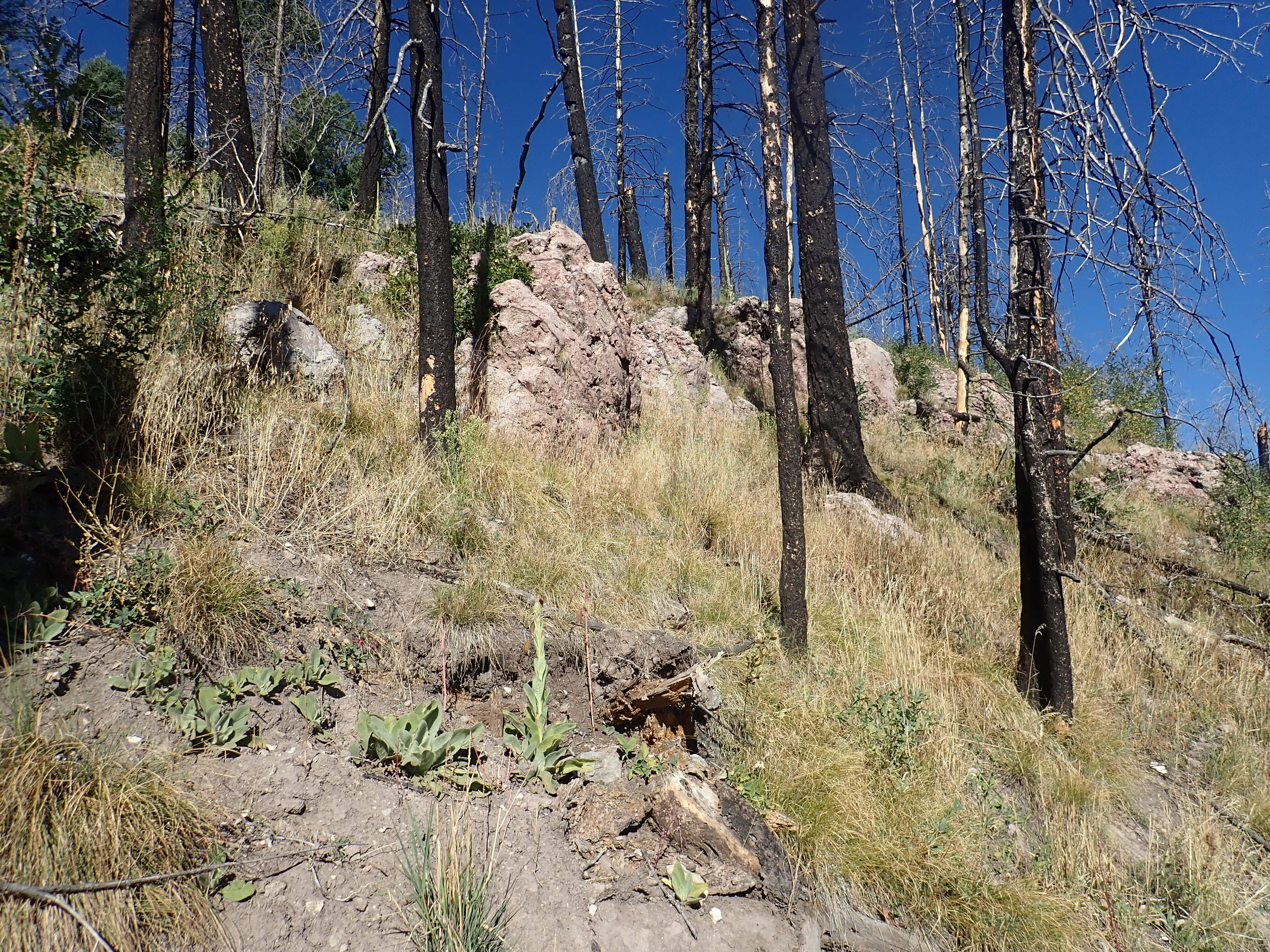
Exposures of Deer Canyon Member on the east flank of Redondo Peak

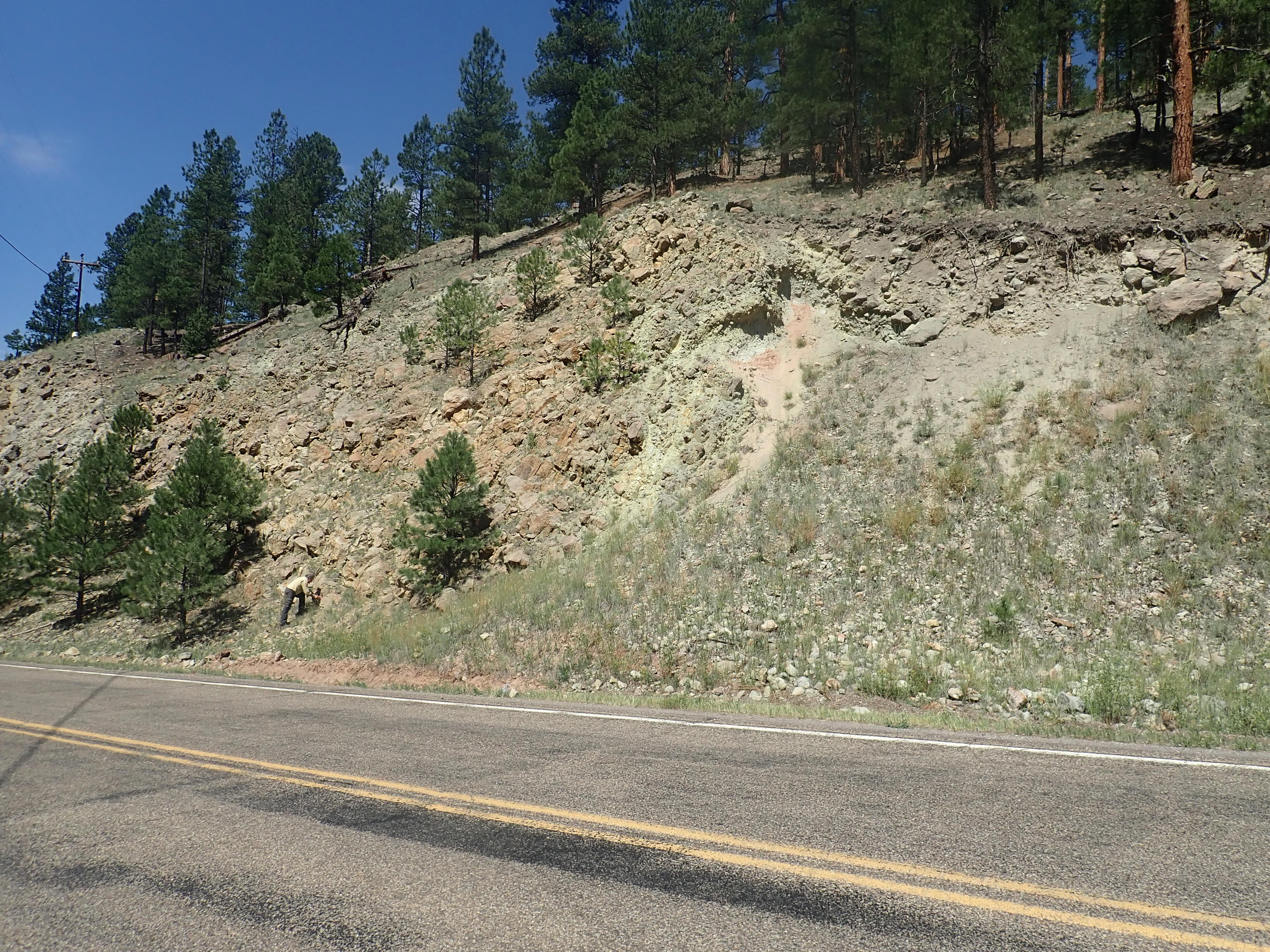
Redondo Creek Member at Thompson Ridge

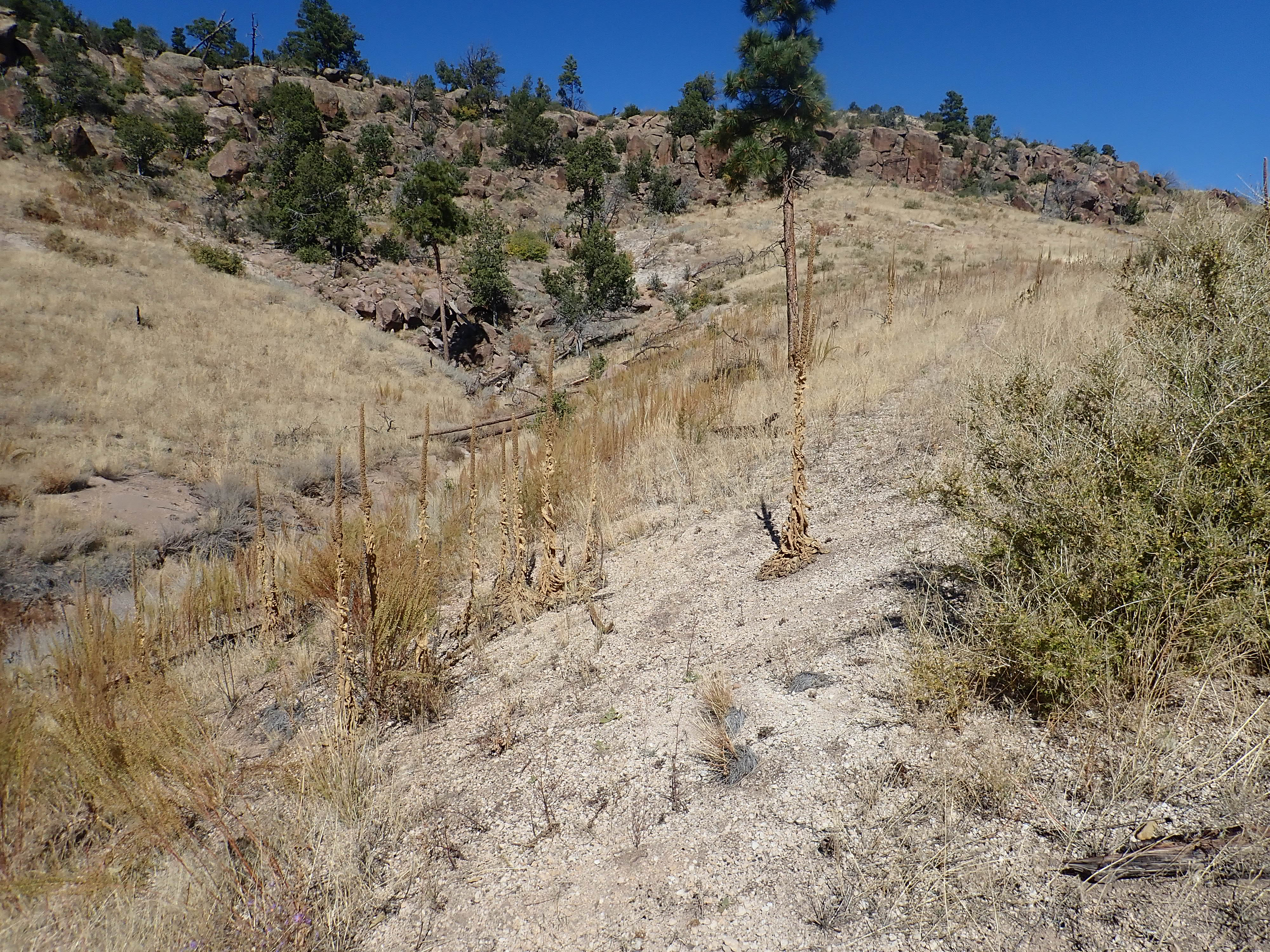
Beds of unconsolidated El Cajete Pumice in western Bandelier National Monument

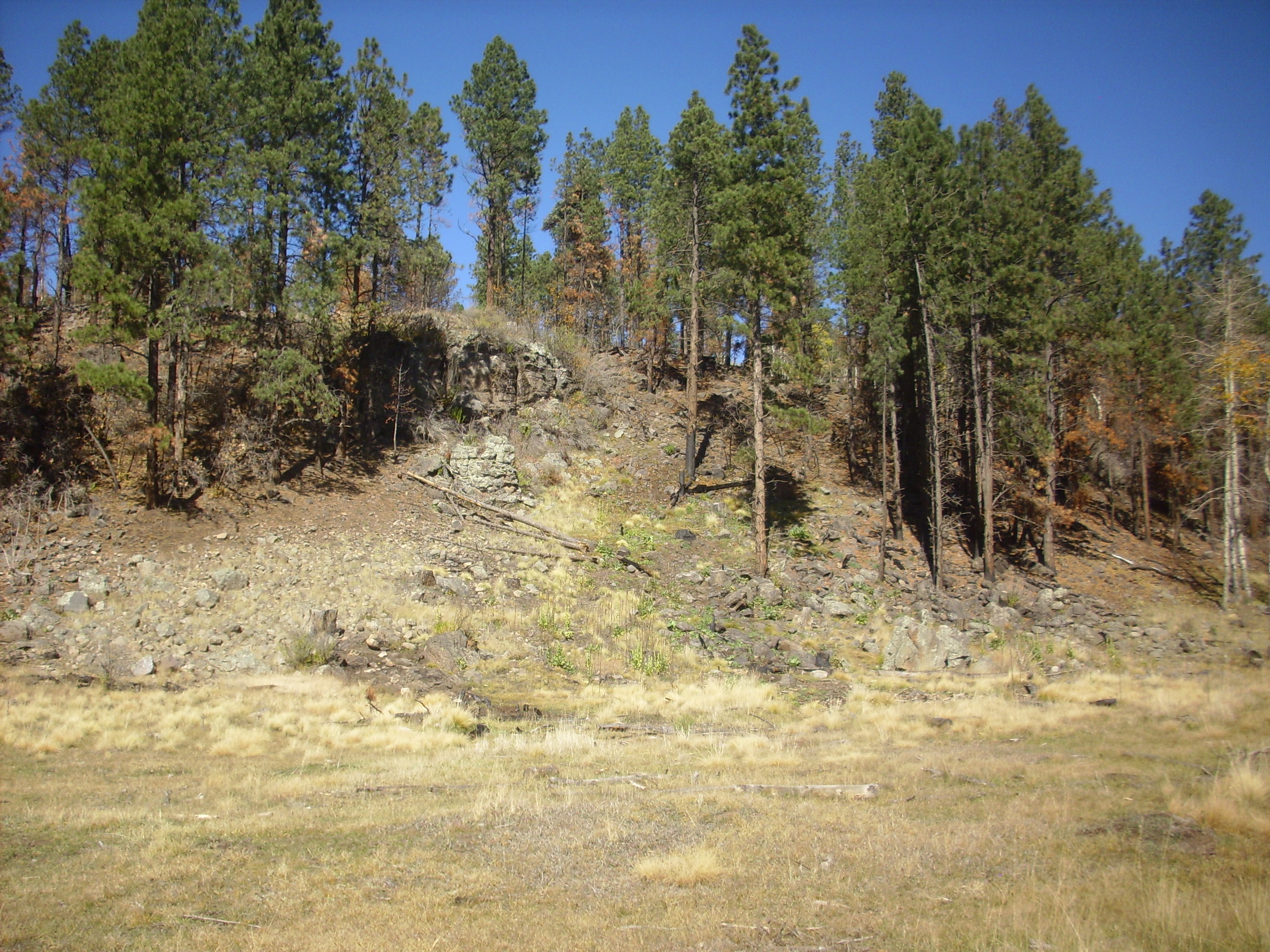
East face of Banco Bonito flow at El Cajete vent

The quartz latite of Cerro Rubio, originally included in the Tewa Group, has been reassigned to the Tschicoma Formation of the Polvadera Group based on radiometric dating and geochemistry.

== History of investigation ==
The group was first defined by R.L. Griggs in 1964 his study of groundwater resources near the town of Los Alamos, New Mexico. The group was named for the Tewa Mountains, an obsolete name for the Jemez Mountains. R.L. Smith, R.A. Bailey, and C.S. Ross adopted Grigg's nomenclature in 1969 as part of their work establishing the stratigraphy of the Jemez Mountains, but proposing some further subdivisions of formations and members. The stratigraphy was further refined by Gardner and collaborators in 2010.
