= Keres Group =

Group of geologic formations in New Mexico, USA

- Stratigraphic range: Mid-Late Miocene; ~13–6 Ma
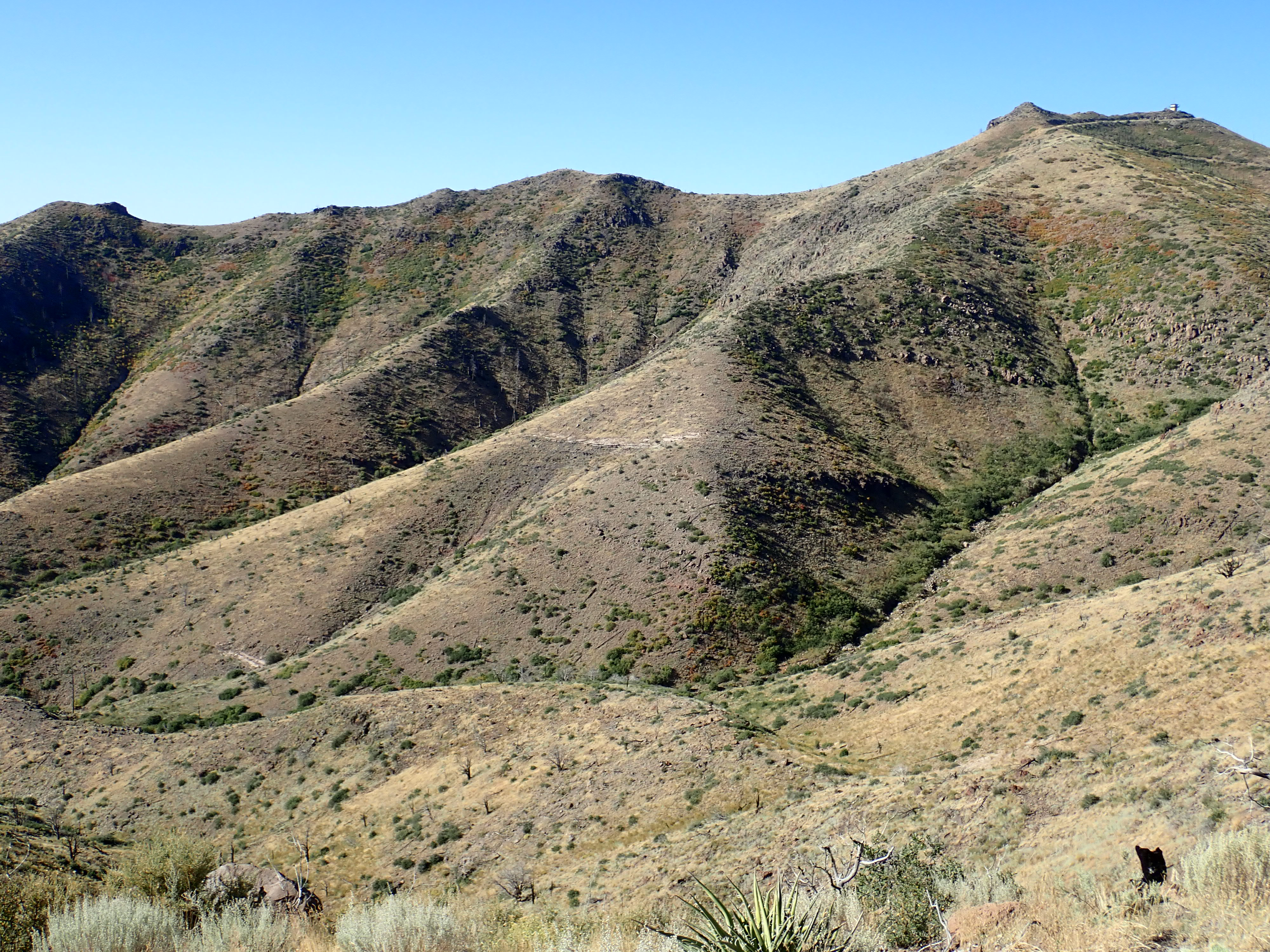
- St Peters Dome, a mountain underlain by Keres Group beds
- Type: Group
- Sub-units: See text
- Underlies: Polvadera & Tewa Groups
- Overlies: Santa Fe Group
- Thickness: 900 m (3,000 ft)

Lithology
- Primary: Andesite
- Other: Basalt, dacite, rhyolite

Location
- Coordinates: 35.796°N 106.547°W
- Region: New Mexico
- Country: United States
- Extent: Jemez Mountains

Type section
- Named for: Keresean Range (see text)
- Named by: Bailey, Smith & Ross
- Year defined: 1969
- Keres Group (the United States) Keres Group (New Mexico)

The Keres Group is a group of geologic formations exposed in and around the Jemez Mountains of northern New Mexico. Radiometric dating gives it an age of 13 to 6 million years, corresponding to the Miocene epoch.

== Geology ==
The Jemez Mountains lie on the intersection of the western margin of the Rio Grande Rift and the Jemez Lineament. Here magma produced from the fertile rock of an ancient subduction zone has repeatedly found its way to the surface along faults produced by rifting. This has produced a long-lived volcanic field, with the earliest eruptions beginning at least 13 million years ago in both the northern (Polvadera Group) and southern (Keres Group) portions of the volcanic field. High-silica eruptions of the Tewa Group began about 1.85 million years ago and continued almost to the present day.

The Keres Group is a sequence of basalt, andesite, dacite, and rhyolite flows that underlie the southern Jemez Mountains. It overlaps the Polvadera Group to the north and has a maximum thickness of about 900 meters (3,000 feet). It overlies the Santa Fe Group to the south and is overlain by the Tewa Group. Keres volcanism began about 12 million years ago and continued to 6 million years ago. Volcanic activity generally shifted eastward over time during this interval.

=== Formations ===
From oldest to youngest, the formations recognized within the Keres Group are the Paliza Canyon Formation, the Canovas Canyon Rhyolite, and the Bearhead Rhyolite.

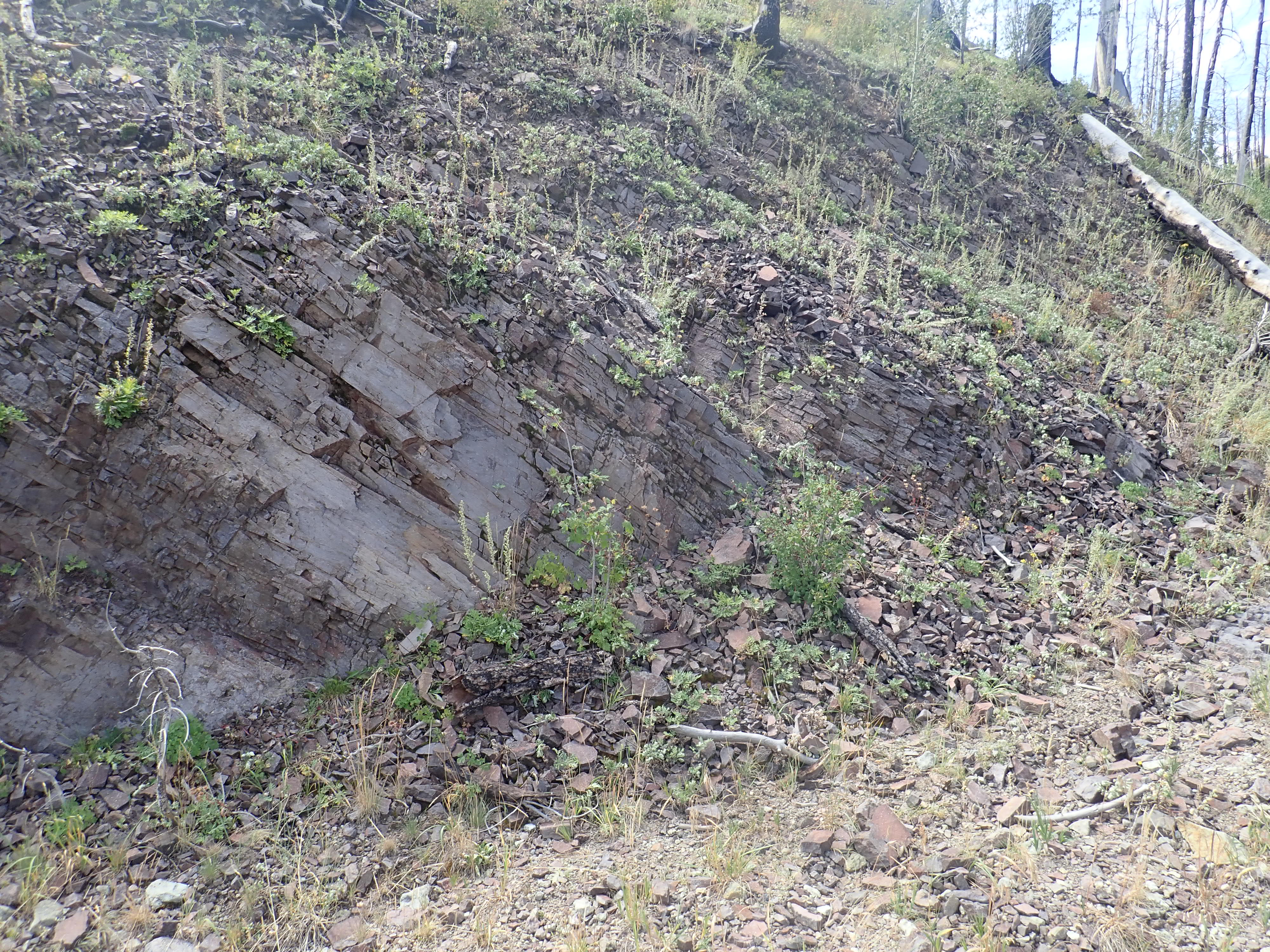
Paliza Canyon Formation andesite near south rim of Valles caldera

The Paliza Canyon Formation is a sequence of mostly andesite flows that is widely exposed in the southern Jemez Mountains. The formation was erupted by numerous coalesced composite volcanoes centered on an axis from the northern Valles Caldera wall south through Paliza and Peralta Canyons to Ruiz Peak (35.717°N 106.544°W). Exposures along this axis generally exceed 500 meters (1,600 feet) in thickness. The base of the formation is not exposed along this axis, so its total thickness is unknown, but it is estimated from exposures to the west to be about 900 meters (3,000 feet).

The formation rests on rocks dating from the Permian to the Miocene. These include red beds of the Abo Formation in the valley of the Rio Guadalupe in the western Jemez and in upper Canon de San Diego; Chinle Formation beds in lower Paliza Canyon; Abiquiu Formation on the west wall of the Valles caldera and in upper San Juan Canyon; and Santa Fe Group at the east foot of St. Peter's Dome to the east. The Paliza Canyon Formation is intruded and locally overlain by Bearhead Rhyolite. In the north and northeast wall of the Valles caldera, the Paliza Canyon Formation appears to be conformably overlain with dacite and quartz latite flows of the Tschicoma Formation (Polvadera Group). However, the alteration of the Paliza Canyon beds in contrast with the fresh appearance of the Tschicoma beds suggests a disconformity between the formations. The Paliza Canyon Formation is also locally overlain unconformably by the Bandelier Tuff.

Beds assigned to the Basalt of Chamisa Mesa, once thought to be the earliest volcanic rock of the Jemez Mountains, have since been found to be unremarkable in age and composition and are now assigned to the Paliza Canyon Formation.

The Canovas Canyon Formation is a sequence of rhyolite flows, tuffs, domes, and associated shallow intrusions exposed primarily around Bear Springs Peak (35.669°N 106.559°W). The formation is named for exposures in Canovas Canyon (35.607°N 106.573°W). It has a maximum exposed thickness of 300 meters (980 feet) and extends to Borrego Mesa to the southwest. Isolated exposures are found further to the east as far as the San Miguel Mountains. The formation is generally overlain and interbedded with flows of the Paliza Canyon Formation. It overlies beds of the Santa Fe Group. Radimetric ages for this formation range from 12 to 8 million years.

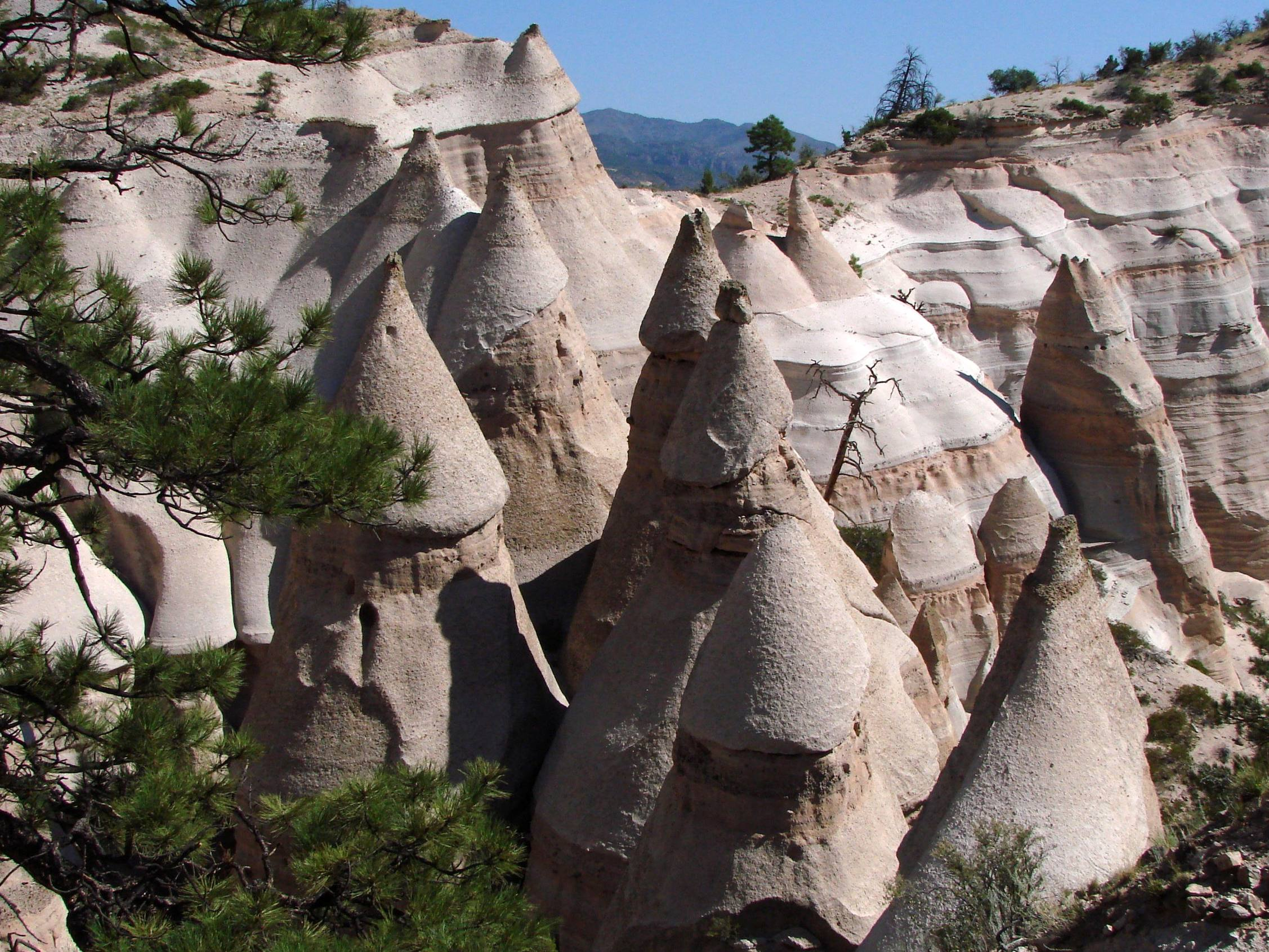
Peralta Tuff at Kasha-Katuwe Tent Rocks National Monument

The Bearhead Rhyolite is a thick stack of rhyolite tuffs, flows, domes, and associated shallow intrusions exposed from the northeastern Valles caldera rim to north of Cochiti Pueblo. It is named for exposures on Bearhead Peak (35.725°N 106.483°W), one of the major source vents of the formation. The formation ranges in age from 7.1 to 6.5 million years. High-silica volcanism shifted to the north around 7.5 million years ago, producing the separation between the Canovas Canyon Rhyolite and the Bearhead Rhyolite.

The Bearhead Rhyolite is similar to the Canovas Canyon Rhyolite, but is distinguished by field relationships: It rests on an erosional surface cut mostly on flows of the Paliza Canyon Formation. Its uppermost beds interfinger with the Cochiti Formation.

Unlike most felsic volcanism, the Bearhead Rhyolite seems to have been erupted effusively. This has been attributed to rapid crustal extension associated with the Rio Grande rift, whose faulting opened numerous paths to the surface for the magma before it could build up to a catastrophic caldera eruption.

Tuffs of the Bearhead Rhyolite, extensively exposed at Kasha-Katuwe Tent Rocks National Monument, are assigned to the Peralta Tuff Member, a name first used by Kirk Bryan and J. E. Upson. The member is named for its exposures in Peralta Canyon. It consists mainly of bedded air-fall tuffs but includes pyroclastic flows and reworked tuffs.

== Economic geology ==
Gold has been mined from the Bland district, from beds identified as the exhumed interior of a Keres Group volcano.

== History ==
The group was first defined by Bailey, Smith, and Ross in 1969 as part of their work establishing the stratigraphy of the Jemez Mountains. The group was named for the Keresean Range, an older name for the southern Jemez Mountains. They included in the group the Basalt of Chamisa Mesa, the Canovas Canyon Rhyolite, the Paliza Canyon Formation, and the Bearhead Rhyolite. The Basalt of Chamisa Mesa has since been abandoned as a formation name, since it is similar in age and composition to the Paliza Canyon Formation.

The division of the precaldera formations of the Jemez Mountains into the Keres and Polvadera Groups, based largely on geography, has been criticized as artificial. Fraser Goff and coinvestigators abandoned the Polvadera Group in their 2011 mapping of the Valles Caldera and included its formations in the Keres Group.
