= Quartz latite =

Rock composed mostly of alkali feldspar and plagioclase

- Volcanic rock
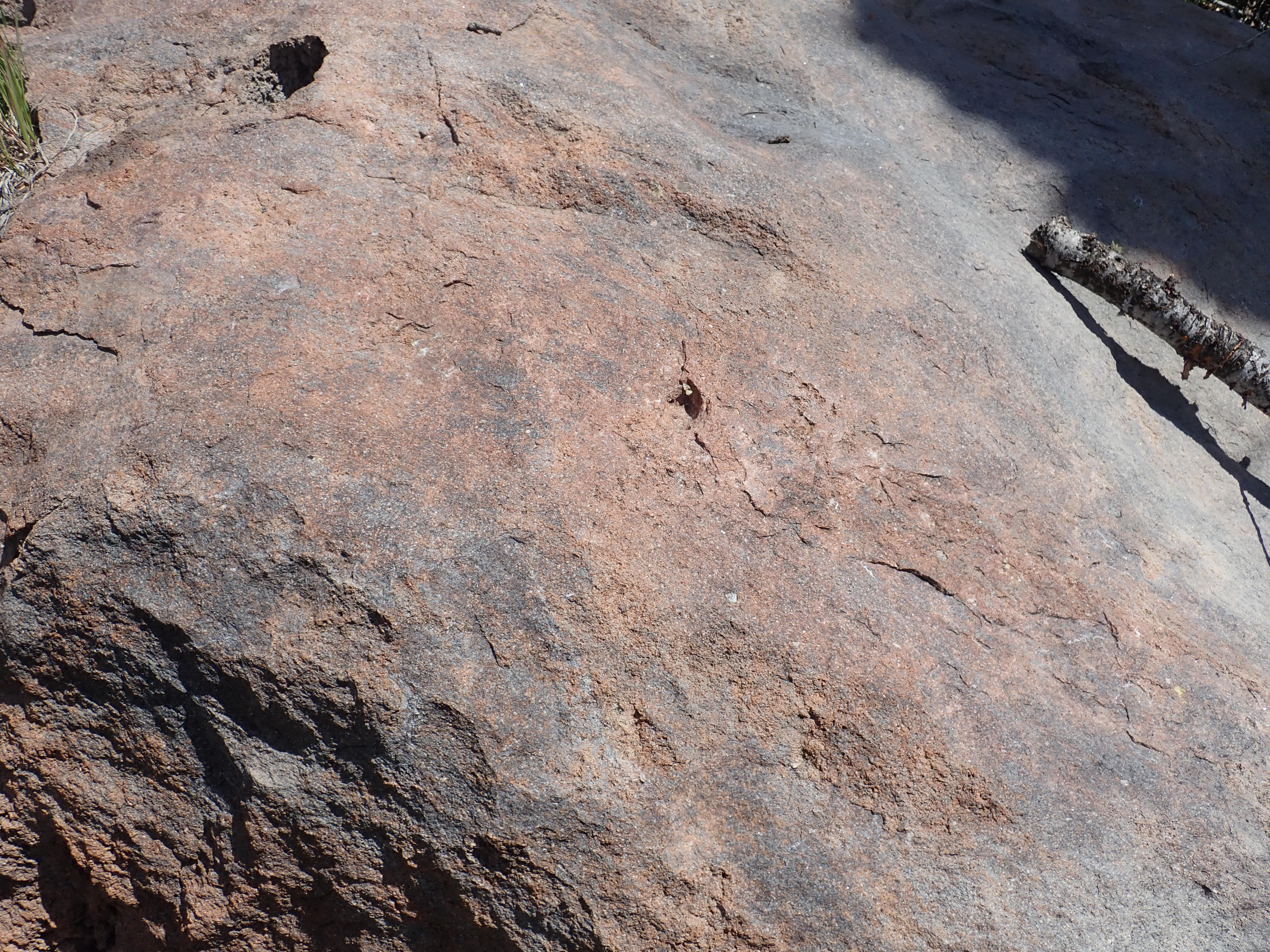
- A boulder of quartz latite from the Cerro Rubio plug, Jemez Mountains, New Mexico, USA. Field of view is about 50 cm.

Composition
- Intermediate; Major minerals: plagioclase, alkali feldspar, quartz

A quartz latite is a volcanic rock or fine grained extrusive rock composed mostly of alkali feldspar and plagioclase with some quartz. It forms from the rapid cooling of magma of intermediate composition but moderately enriched in alkali metal oxides.

Quartz latite is intermediate between latite and rhyolite in its mineralogy.

== Description ==
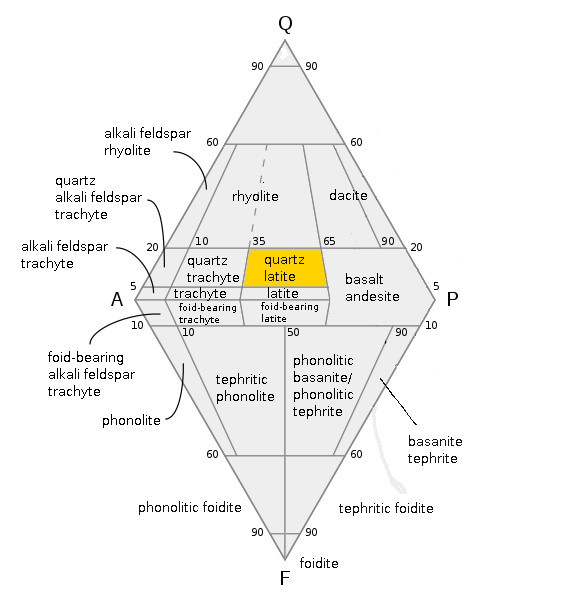
QAPF diagram for volcanic rock with quartz latite field highlighted in yellow

Quartz latite is the fine-grained equivalent of a quartz monzonite, containing approximately equal amounts of plagioclase and alkali feldspar and between 5% and 20% quartz and with plagioclase making up 35% to 65% of its total feldspar content. Quartz latite is not a recognized rock type in the TAS classification used to chemically classify glassy or very fine-grained volcanic rock.

== Occurrence ==
Quartz latite is found in the 130-135 Mya Etendeka Formation of Namibia, where it forms extensive sheets in association with tholeiitic basalt. These are interpreted as densely welded ash flow tuffs. Some of the quartz latite flows were enormous, with estimated volumes of 2,320 cubic kilometers (560 cu mi) and 6,340 cubic kilometers (1,520 cu mi) for two of the flows.

Paleoproterozoic quartz latite is abundant in the Roxby Downs area of Australia, and may have been a source rock for younger granitoids.

Quartz latite is found at the Bingham mine in Utah in association with its plutonic counterpart, quartz monzonite.
