= Jemez Mountains =

Mountain range in New Mexico, United States

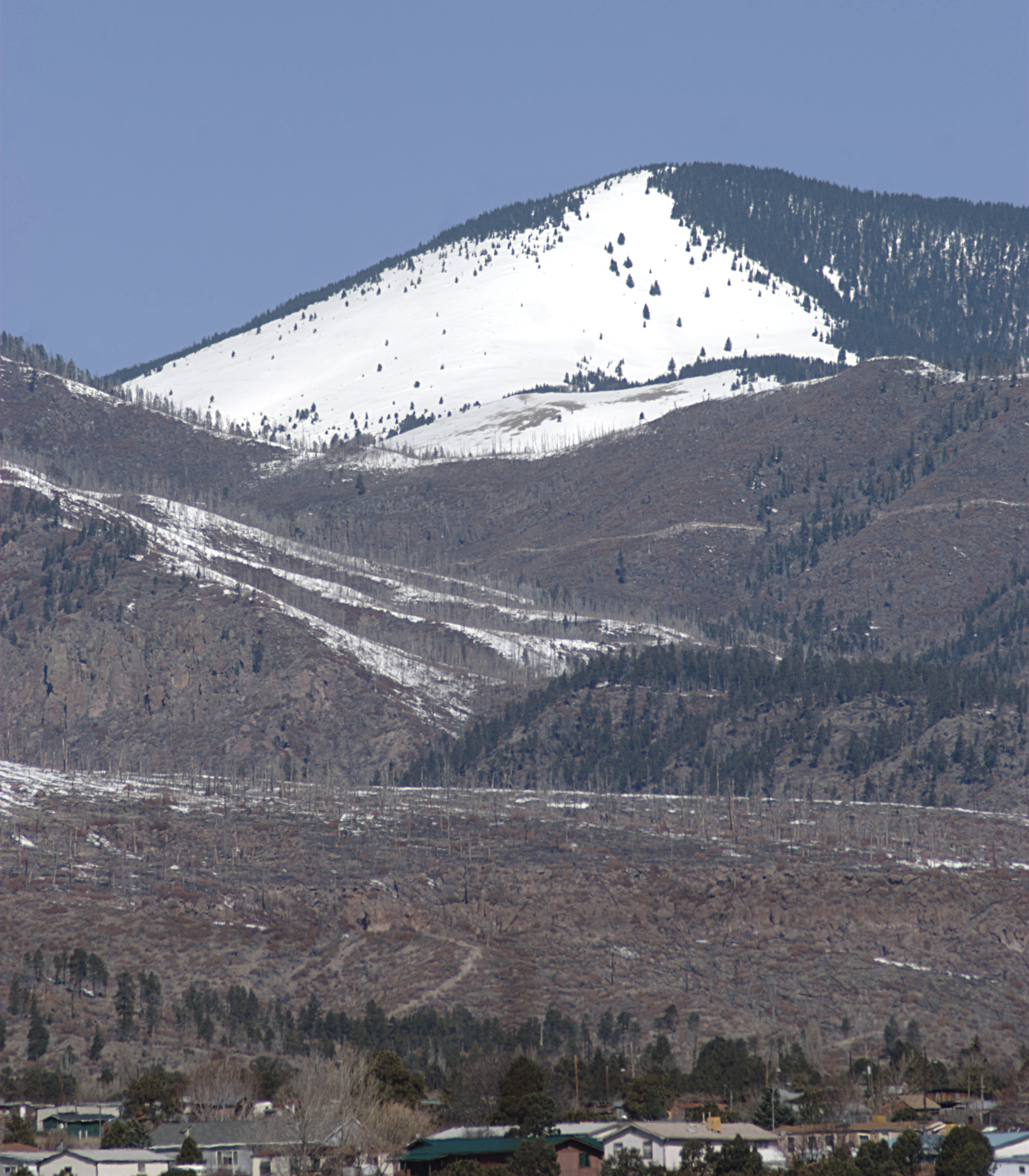
- Chicoma Mountain, the highest peak of the Jemez

Highest point
- Peak: Chicoma Mountain
- Elevation: 3,524 m (11,562 ft); NAVD 88
- Coordinates: 36°00′26″N 106°23′04″W

Geography
- Location within New Mexico
- Country: United States
- State: New Mexico
- Topo map: USGS Polvadera Peak (1977)

The Jemez Mountains (/ˈheɪmɛz/, Tewa: Tsąmpiye'ip'įn, Navajo: Dził Łizhinii) are a group of mountains in Rio Arriba, Sandoval, and Los Alamos counties, New Mexico, United States.

Numerous Puebloan Indian tribes have lived in the Jemez Mountains region for centuries before the Spanish arrived in New Mexico. The Pueblo Nations of this region are the Towa-speaking Jemez people, after whom the mountain range is named, and the Keres-speaking Zia People. Pueblos in the Jemez Mountains of New Mexico consisted of compact multistoried buildings which enclosed small plazas. Most of their several hundred rooms were probably occupied by single families, but some were storerooms.

The Jemez Mountains include climates varying from desert at the lowest elevations to sub-arctic conditions at the highest elevations. A significant diversity of climate and vegetation is linked to gradients in elevation and the region's topographical features. The highest point in the range is Chicoma Mountain (also spelled as Tschicoma or Tchicoma) at an elevation of 11,561 feet (3,524 meters). The town of Los Alamos and the Los Alamos National Laboratory adjoin the eastern side of the range while the town of Jemez Springs is to the west. Pajarito Mountain Ski Area is the only ski area in the Jemez. New Mexico State Highway 4 is the primary road that provides vehicular access to locations in the Jemez Mountains.

== Geology ==
The Jemez Mountains lie in north-central New Mexico, to the north of the Albuquerque Basin in the Rio Grande rift, and span altitudes from 1,590 meters at the Rio Grande to 3,526 meters at the peak of Tschicoma Peak. This geological demarcation encompasses approximately 543,522 hectares, according to Smith et al.'s 1976 study. They are a classic example of intracontinental volcanism and consist of a broadly circular ridge surrounding the Valles Caldera. The latter is the type location for resurgent caldera eruptions.

The mountains lie on the intersection of the western margin of the Rio Grande rift and the Jemez Lineament. Here magma produced from the fertile rock of an ancient subduction zone has repeatedly found its way to the surface along faults produced by rifting. This has produced a long-lived volcanic field, with the earliest eruptions beginning at least 13 million years ago and continuing almost to the present day. The most recent known eruption is the obsidian of the Banco Bonito flow, dated to 68.3 ± 1.5 thousand years before the present.

Most of the volume of the range is composed of pre-caldera basalts, andesites, and dacites of the Keres Group and Polvadera Group, but there are extensive outflow sheets of the Bandelier Tuff and young rhyolites associated with caldera resurgence, all assigned to the Tewa Group.

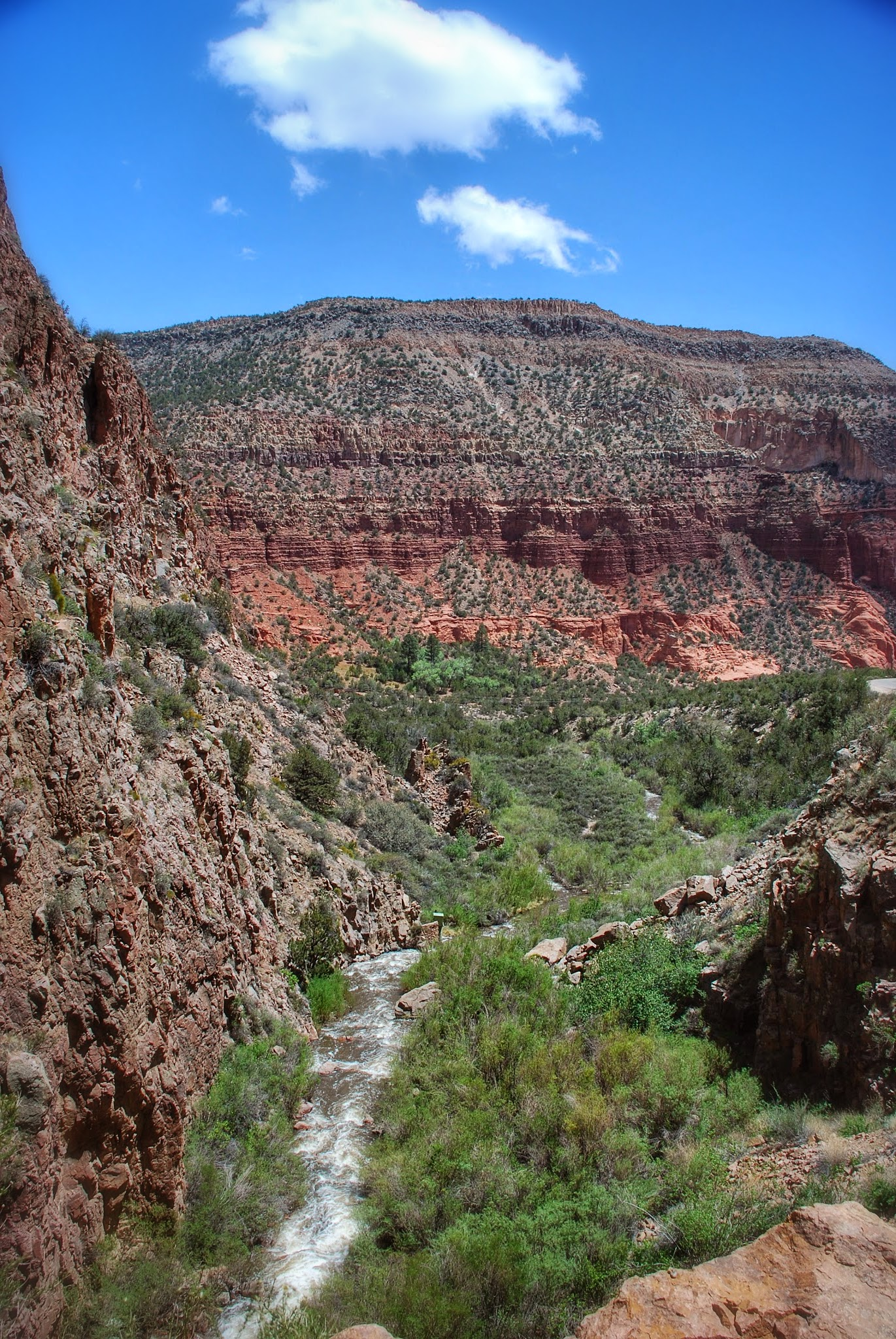
Guadelupita Mesa in the southwestern Jemez

The two most recent caldera-forming eruptions, dated to about 1.62 million and 1.256 million years ago, produced massive ignimbrite deposits known as the Otowi and Tshirege members, respectively, of the Bandelier Tuff. Much of the material in these deposits now forms the Pajarito Plateau, a scenic region of canyons and mesas on which Los Alamos is situated. Redondo Peak, the second-highest summit in the range at 11,254 ft (3431 m), is a resurgent dome in the middle of the Valles Caldera, which also contains several smaller volcanos. In the Jemez Mountains, the Quaternary volcanic field, encompasses the Valles caldera and the connected Bandelier Tuff. The caldera is segregated by these structures and its rim into multiple lush grass valleys (valles in Spanish, hence the name).

The western part of the Valles Caldera is underlain by a seismic low-velocity zone with an area of 10 by 14 kilometers (6.2 by 8.7 mi) and extending to depths of 5 to 15.5 kilometers (3.1 to 9.6 mi). This zone consists of at least 10% molten rock and represents a new pulse of magmatic activity. This is monitored by the Los Alamos Seismic Network, which has detected no unusual volcano-seismic activity since it was installed in the 1970s.

== Public use ==
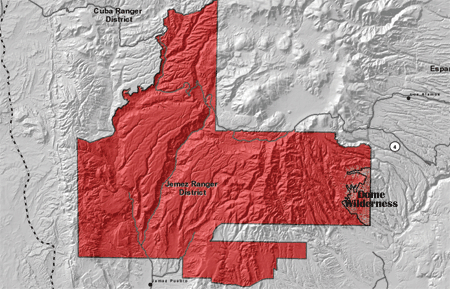
Jemez Ranger District, Santa Fe National Forest

Much of the range is federal land, including Santa Fe National Forest, Bandelier National Monument, and the Valles Caldera National Preserve. State lands include Fenton Lake State Park at 35°52′58″N 106°43′46″W in Sandoval County. Hiking trails, including a section of the Continental Divide Trail, crisscross the range and lead to many of the summits, although some regions are closed to hikers either because of environmental restrictions or because they are on the territory of Santa Clara Pueblo or private landholders. (Access to pueblo lands is available by permit.) The summits are generally easy to climb (in good weather) and require no technical climbing skills, but rock climbing is popular on some of the basalt cliffs near Los Alamos, Caja del Rio and elsewhere in the range. There are several hot and cold springs throughout the mountains, including the popular Spence Springs and Seven Springs, as well as Soda Dam. There are five official established campsites in the mountains, and many additional locations for backpackers as well. Another popular recreational activity is fishing in the Jemez River and San Antonio Creek. The mountains also are home to Pajarito Mountain, a small downhill ski area. Cross country skiing and snowshoeing are available on trails in the winter. However, not every winter produces enough snow to support activities that require significant snowfall. The region is prone to forest fires because of the tendency for spring weather to be dry and windy, creating conditions under which fires caused by human activities or lightning can spread rapidly. The Las Conchas Fire in 2011 was the most recent large wildfire. Parts of Los Alamos National Laboratory were also damaged, although none of the laboratory's special nuclear materials were threatened or released.

== Historical communities ==
Around the early 14th century, the Towa people built pueblos in the Jemez Mountains. The pueblos include Unshagi, Nanishagi, and Giusewa pueblos. Before the arrival of the Spanish in the 17th century, the area was well-populated, and had established farming communities and trade systems. Outside of the pueblos, the ruins of around 300 small structures have been discovered. Potsherds have been found near a majority of the structures, and arrowheads have been found in many of the surrounding areas.

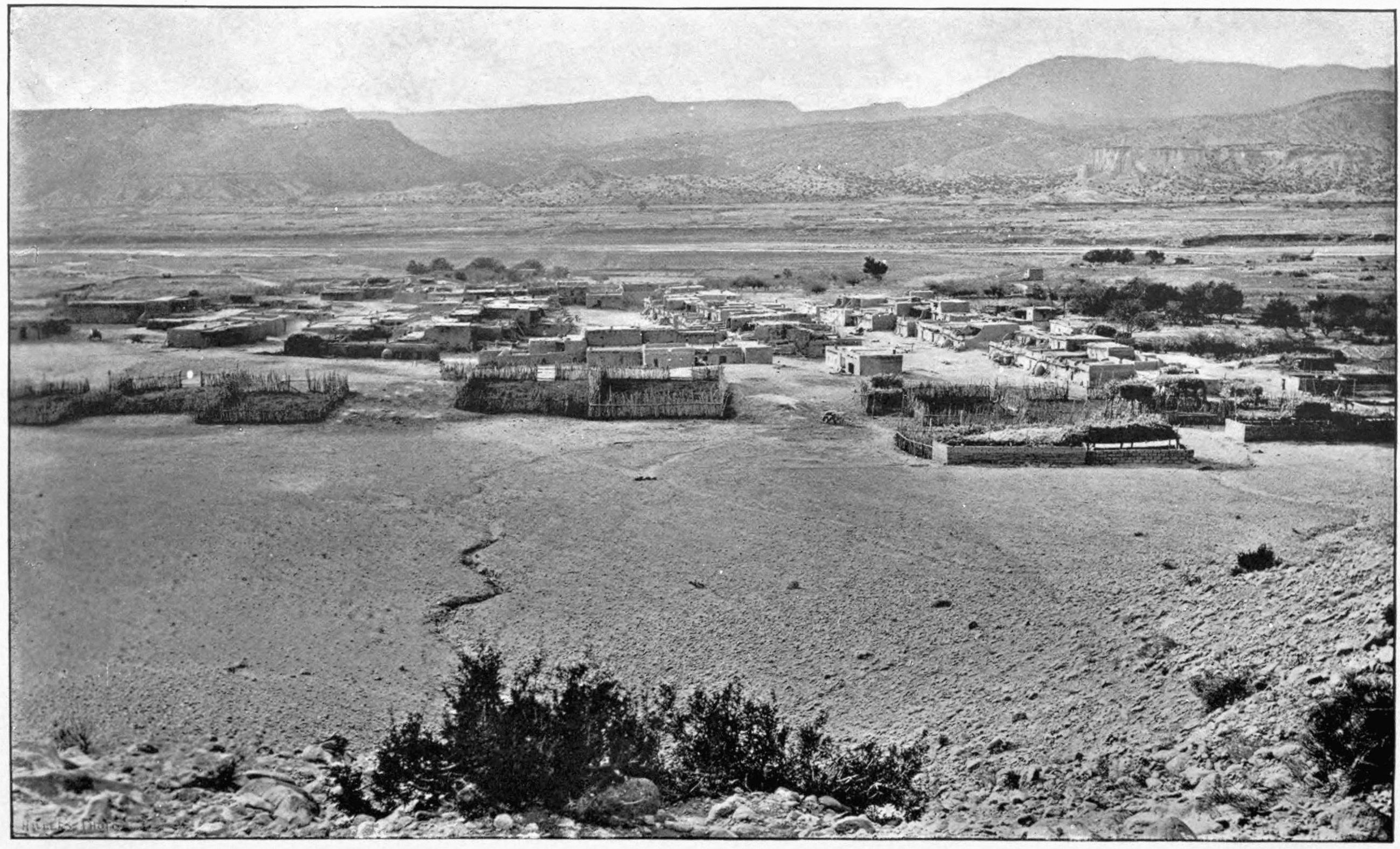
Jemez Pueblo, photograph taken between 1879–1882

When the Spanish began their colonization efforts in the 17th century, they heard the Towa word Hemes, meaning "the people." They then translated it to the Spanish spelling, Jemez. The Spanish forced the Towa living in Giusewa pueblo (the most significant pueblo of the region at the time) to abandon their traditional practice, and to adopt Catholicism. From the very beginning, the Jemez resisted the Spanish oppression, initiating two uprisings against them prior to the occurrence of the Pueblo Revolt in 1680. After the Pueblo Revolt in 1680, the Spanish set about a campaign of reoccupation in 1692. the Towa were able to resist for longer because of the distance of the Jemez mountains from the Rio Grande Valley, which was where the main concentration of Spanish activity was. Giusewa was reoccupied in 1694, and revolted again in 1696. This revolt was ultimately a failure, and many Towa people sought refuge among the Navajo. In 1703, the majority of individuals had come back to the Jemez Valley, reconstructing their pueblo. In 1838, as Pecos Pueblo, a different village speaking Towa in the Galisteo Basin, was deserted, its seventeen inhabitants relocated to Jemez Pueblo.

== Modern communities ==
Census-designated places within the Jemez Mountains include Jemez Springs and Jemez Pueblo (referred to as Walatowa in Towa). Jemez Springs is a small town with a population of 198 according to the 2020 census. In the Jemez Pueblo, more than 90% of around 3400 members speak the Towa language. Within this community, all decisions are made by the tribal government, which are heavily influenced by traditional connections to the Jemez land. Increases in wildfires and bark-beetle outbreaks in the most recent decade are likely related to extreme drought and high temperatures during this period.

== Flora ==
There are over 720 plant species in the Jemez Mountain region with six community types that include, subalpine grassland, spruce-fir, mixed conifer, ponderosa pine, pinyon juniper, and juniper-grassland. Adding a touch of color to the landscape are wildflowers like alpine larkspur, forget-me-nots, saxifrages, and sedges. Ponderosa pine are found between 2100 and 2300 meters on the east side of the Jemez Mountains while mixed conifer forests are found between 2100 and 3200 meters in elevation. Spruce-fir forests are mostly found at the summits of mountains due to suitable climate conditions. Additionally, oak shrublands have emerged on certain mountain slopes and in high mountain meadows as a result of wildfires. The San Pedro Parks Wilderness in the northwest region, White Rock Canyon along the Rio Grande, and the desert shrublands at the extreme southwest part of the Jemez Mountains, particularly capture attention due to their distinctive plant life.

== Fauna ==
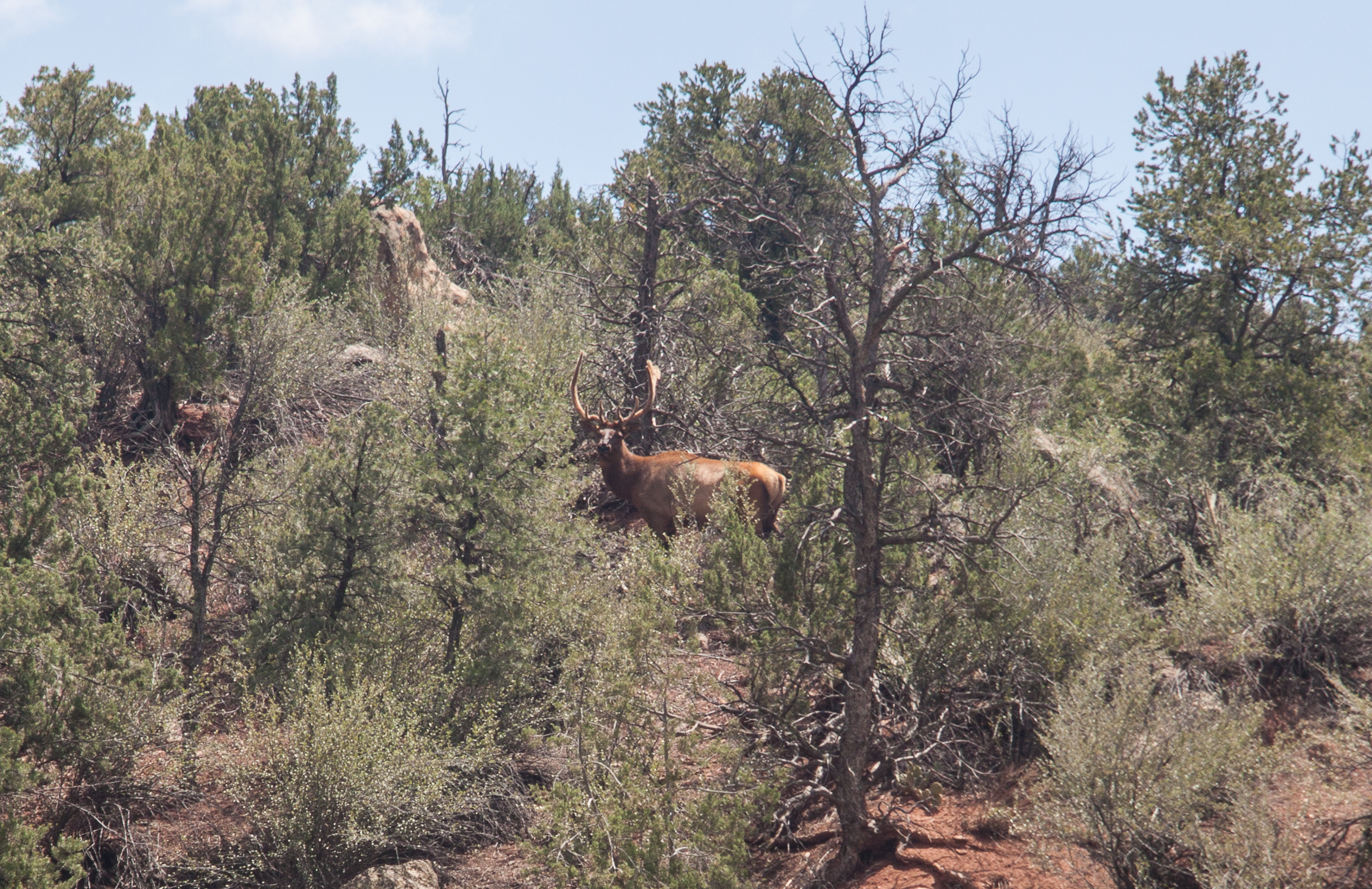
Jemez Mountain American Elk

The Jemez Mountains house the American elk (wapiti), the golden-mantled ground squirrel, the Gunnison's prairie dog, American beavers, black bears, and mountain lions. The Jemez Mountains are also home to a federally endangered species, the Jemez Mountains salamander. This species is mostly found in mixed-conifer forests and was listed under the Endangered Species Act in 2013. The Jemez Mountains salamander's habitat is in danger due to forest fires, increased tree density, the destruction of habitat, and climate change.
