= The Light That Failed (1939 film) =

1939 film by William A. Wellman

- Poster
- Directed by: William A. Wellman
- Screenplay by: Robert Carson
- Based on: The Light That Failed; 1891 novel by Rudyard Kipling
- Produced by: William A. Wellman
- Starring: Ronald Colman; Walter Huston; Muriel Angelus; Ida Lupino
- Cinematography: Theodor Sparkuhl
- Edited by: Thomas Scott
- Music by: Victor Young
- Production company: Paramount Pictures
- Distributed by: Paramount Pictures
- Release date: December 1939 (New York)
- Running time: 97 minutes
- Country: United States
- Box office: 1,121,789 admissions (France)

The Light That Failed is a 1939 American period drama film based on Rudyard Kipling's 1891 novel of the same name. It stars Ronald Colman as an artist who is going blind.

== Plot ==
In 1865, youngster Dick Heldar is briefly blinded when his girlfriend Maisie accidentally fires his pistol too close to his head. She later tells him that her guardians are sending her away somewhere to be educated, but she agrees when he says she belongs to him "forever and ever."

Years later, Dick is a British soldier during the Mahdist War in Sudan. When the natives attack suddenly, he saves the life of his friend, war correspondent "Torp" Torpenhow, but receives a head wound as a result.

He turns to painting to try to make a living. When his works start to sell, he returns to England. His realistic paintings of scenes from the war become immensely popular with the critics and the public. In London, he moves in with Torp and is reunited with a grown-up Maisie, also a painter, though not as successful. Liking the financial rewards, Dick is persuaded to sanitize his gritty realism to make his works more attractive to the masses. Torp and fellow war correspondent "The Nilghai" try to warn him about it, but he pays no heed; he becomes complacent and lazy. Maisie decides to move away and stop seeing him.

One night, Dick returns to his lodgings to find a young, bedraggled woman lying on his sofa. Torp explains that she fainted from hunger outside, so he brought her in and fed her Dick's dinner. She bitterly gives her name as Bessie Broke. Dick becomes fascinated; she is the ideal model for Melancholia, a painting that Maisie had struggled to complete. He hires her to pose for him.

When his vision starts to blur, he goes to see a doctor who gives him a grim prognosis: as a result of his old war injury, he will go blind in a year if he avoids strain, "not very long" if he does not.

Before he completely loses his sight, Dick resolves to paint his masterpiece, Melancholia. He drinks heavily and drives Bessie to hysteria to evoke the desired expression. When Torp returns from his latest assignment, Dick tells him about his blindness and shows him the painting. While Dick sleeps, Bessie (furious with Dick for having told Torp not to pursue a romance with her) sneaks in and destroys it, unaware of his ailment. When Dick awakens, he is blind. Torp tries to hide Bessie's act from him and sends for Maisie. When Dick shows her his masterpiece, Maisie cannot bring herself to tell him it is ruined, and leaves.

One day, while he is out on a walk, Dick's servant recognizes Bessie, and Dick invites her to his home. He shows her the balance in his bank book, proposes that she take care of him and kisses her. Realizing that he will learn the truth at some point, she confesses what she has done. As the news sinks in, he changes his plans.

Dick travels back to Sudan, where he wears his old uniform and hires a guide to take him to join Torp. They ride on horseback into the midst of a battle. Sensing that the British cavalry is about to deploy, Dick has Torp to direct him into the charge, where he is shot and killed by a native.

== Cast ==
- Ronald Colman as Dick Heldar
  - Ronald Sinclair as Dick Heldar (as a boy)
- Walter Huston as Torpenhow
- Muriel Angelus as Maisie
- Ida Lupino as Bessie Broke
- Dudley Digges as The Nilghai
- Ernest Cossart as Beeton
- Ferike Boros as Madame Binat, a friend in Port Said
- Pedro de Cordoba as Monsieur Binat
- Colin Tapley as Gardner
- Halliwell Hobbes as Doctor
- Francis McDonald as George, the guide
- George Regas as Cassavetti

== Production ==
The film had some outdoor scenes shot in New Mexico, between Otowi and Buckman in White Rock Canyon, along the Denver & Rio Grande Western Railroad's Chili Line, where it ran alongside the Rio Grande. The producers had decided that the area would stand in for a British military campaign along the Nile flowing through Sudan, with D&RGW C-19 2-8-0 No. 343 disguised with sand bags and other alterations as an Egyptian locomotive pulling an armored train. The river alongside the tracks was temporarily dammed to raise the water level, and 300 people from the local Tewa pueblos were cast as a Sudanese rebel army.

== Reception ==
Frank Nugent, critic for The New York Times, praised the film, calling it a "letter-perfect edition of Kipling's 'The Light That Failed'". He also lauded the star ("Mr. Colman has rarely handled a role with greater authority or charm"), Lupino ("Ida Lupino's Bessie is another of the surprises we get when a little ingenue suddenly bursts forth as a great actress.") and the rest of the principal actors.

== Cinema murder ==
On May 29, 1946, in Bristol, England, cinema manager Robert Parrington Jackson was shot in his office during an evening showing of The Light That Failed. It was believed that the murder was timed to coincide with gunshots from the scene in which young Dick is blinded in order to obscure the sound of the murder gunshots. The murder remains unsolved to this day.
