= Chili Line =

Narrow-gauge branch of the Denver and Rio Grand Western Railroad

Overview
- Status: Closed
- Termini: Antonito, Colorado; Santa Fe, New Mexico

Service
- Operator: Denver and Rio Grande Western Railroad

History
- Opened: 1880s
- Closed: 1941

Technical
- Line length: 125.6 mi (202.13 km)
- Track gauge: 3 ft (914 mm)

The Chili Line, officially known as the Santa Fe Branch, was a 3 ft (914 mm) narrow-gauge branch of the Denver and Rio Grande Western Railroad (D&RGW). It ran 125.6 miles (202.1 km) from Antonito, Colorado, to Santa Fe, New Mexico. The Denver and Rio Grande Railway (D&RG) began construction of the line in 1880 and completed the line from Antonito to Española, New Mexico, but could not build any further because of an agreement with the Atchison, Topeka and Santa Fe Railroad (AT&SF). The Texas, Santa Fe and Northern Railroad was incorporated to complete the line, and the line between Española and Santa Fe opened in 1886 and was transferred to the Denver and Rio Grande shortly thereafter. The D&RGW closed the Chili Line in 1941 because of competition from road transportation, and the line was abandoned shortly thereafter.

== Name ==
The Chili Line was officially known as the Santa Fe Branch. Its nickname has been attributed to its freight, which prominently featured New Mexico chile peppers, and to the gastronomy of its patrons.

== History ==
The original ambitious plans of Denver and Rio Grande Railway founder William J. Palmer projected a 2,400-mile (3,900 km) north-south narrow gauge route from Denver to Mexico City following the course of the Rio Grande for much of the distance. As early as 1878 it was reasoned that such a route would not be possible, but Palmer did receive a concession in September 1880 from the Mexican government to build a different north-south line, the National Railroad of Mexico. Initially planning to access the Territory of New Mexico via Raton Pass, a route that the AT&SF had already begun grading for the construction of its own east-west transcontinental route, the D&RG had to look for alternative routes to the south as its conflict with the ATSF festered. The conflict eventually resulted in the D&RG shifting its attention to lucrative mining opportunities to the west. Palmer's "dream of a road to Mexico City finally went glimmering" but the line along the Rio Grande became the exotic southern extent of the D&RGW's famous network in the Rocky Mountains. Prior to the conflict, the D&RG had built tracks over La Veta Pass to Alamosa in the San Luis Valley. By 1880 narrow gauge tracks were in place as far south as Antonito and the construction of a line towards Albuquerque was underway.

The AT&SF reached Santa Fe (as a branch of its main line) in February 1880. In March the AT&SF and the D&RG publicly signed a restrictive territorial agreement that prevented the southward expansion of the D&RG beyond Española, where service began on New Year's Eve 1880, for ten years. To fill the approximately 35-mile (56 km) gap the Texas, Santa Fe and Northern Railroad (TSF&N) was formed. The long-term plans of the TSF&N called for the construction of a 1,258-mile (2,025 km) railroad spanning from Texas to Utah. The company proposed to first connect Española to the territorial capital and then south to coal fields near Madrid, New Mexico. Work on the link to Santa Fe was stalled for several years because of money problems and the line further south was not built. With new management in place construction resumed in earnest in October 1886 and by January 1887 the narrow gauge tracks from Santa Fe to Española were complete. An excursion train between the two cities on January 9, 1887 was attended by 200 people. The TSF&N was absorbed by the Santa Fe Southern Railway in 1889 and by 1895 was a unit of the D&RG as the Rio Grande and Santa Fe Railroad.

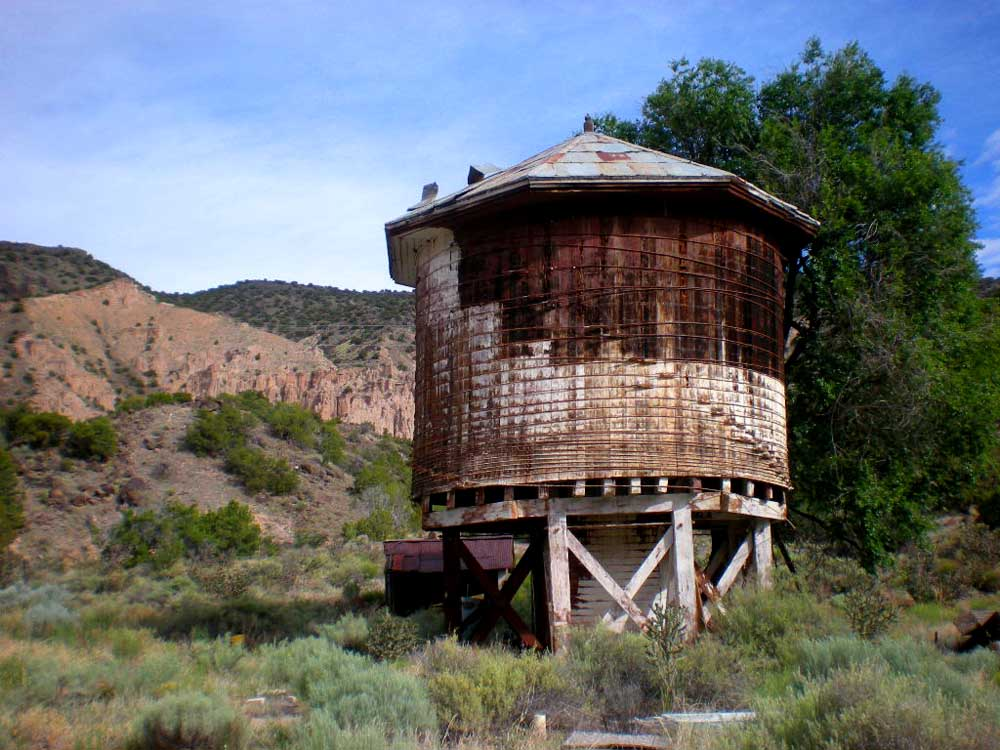
Old water tower at the Embudo Station

Only a few branches were constructed along the Chili Line. During the 1880s and 1890s two short timber spurs were built, one from No Agua to Stewart Junction, and another west from Taos Junction to La Madera for use by the Hallack & Howard Lumber Company for finished lumber products. A line along the Rio Chama from Chamita to the D&RG's San Juan Extension was under construction, with a railbed built as far as Abiquiú. This line started at a wye junction north of the depot at Española and immediately south of the Chili Line's Rio Chama trestle, however, no track was ever laid beyond the wye. In 1903 the D&RG and the New Mexico Central Railway opened Santa Fe Union Station on a site adjacent to the AT&SF's depot. The new station replaced an older one on the north side of the Santa Fe River next to the D&RG's terminal facilities. The D&RG was interested, along with others, in connecting Taos to its system, but surveys indicated that such a connection was not feasible. Instead the name of a station 20 miles (32 km) from Taos was restyled Taos Junction in 1915. The line struggled to turn a profit; road transportation began to outcompete the train, and the quality of the timber shipments was low. The railroad continued to operate until the Interstate Commerce Commission approved DRG&W's abandonment in 1941. The line closed amid Santa Fe's annual fiesta in September 1941. The DR&GW proposed reusing some of the line's infrastructure for use on a railroad along the Burma Road in a then embattled Southeast Asia. Despite some local outcry and national media attention the railway was completely dismantled in 1942. As of 2017, the majority of the Chili Line's former right of way is still relatively intact.

The socio-economic impact of the Chile Line was important to the farmers and residents of Northern New Mexico. For generations the primary mode of production was subsistence farming. The introduction of the railway meant that farmers could now transport their goods to market much faster. Trains would deliver the mail and barrels of potable water from Antonito and San Antonio creeks for sale in localities with severe water shortages. When engineers would pass by towns and blow their whistles, women would bring laundry baskets and collect hot water to do laundry. Brakemen would deliver newspapers from Alamosa to the various stops free of charge by tossing them from the moving trains. One engineer reportedly would deliver a bone daily from an Alamosa butcher shop to Taos Junction for a "loyal newspaper delivery dog ('Minnie')".

== Operations ==
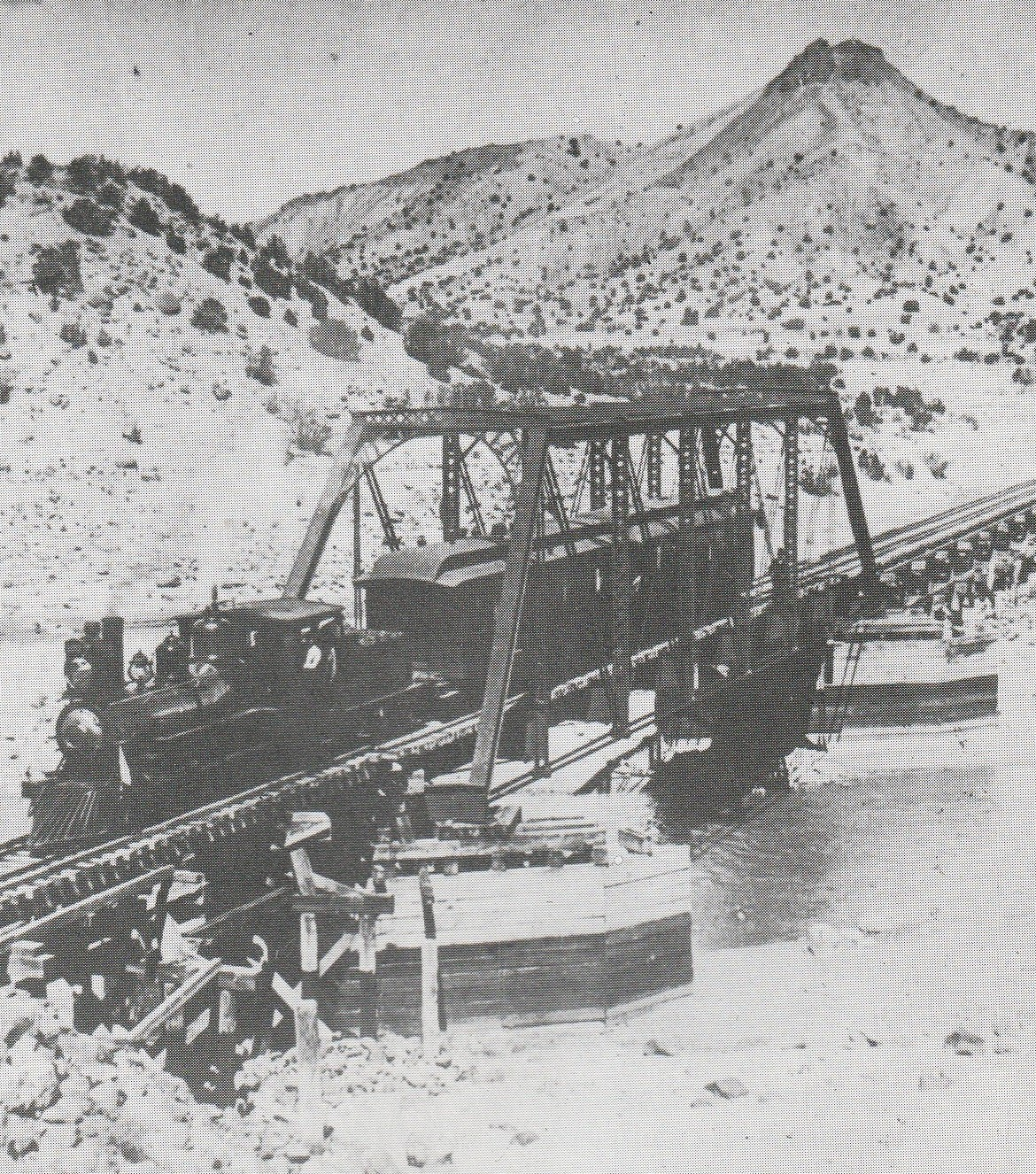
Bridge at Otowi in 1890 by W H Jackson

The railroad was almost completely narrow gauge; Palmer had reasoned that the smaller-scale railroads were advantageous in mountainous areas. There was some dual-gauge track in the Santa Fe Railyard where the railroad shared a station with the 4 ft 8 1/2 in (1,435 mm) New Mexico Central Railway, and also at the line's northern terminal. The original terminal facilities in Santa Fe included a three-stall engine house and a coal shed on the tail of a wye opposite a two-story island depot. These facilities were later replaced by infrastructure capable of tendering petroleum-fueled engines and a union station. Operations of the line were often described as adventurous. The branch served remote areas such as the stop at Buckman, New Mexico, which was the Los Alamos Ranch School's link to the outside world until 1921; a stop near a new road bridge across the Rio Grande at Otowi served this purpose when a new road serving the Pajarito Plateau was completed in 1924.

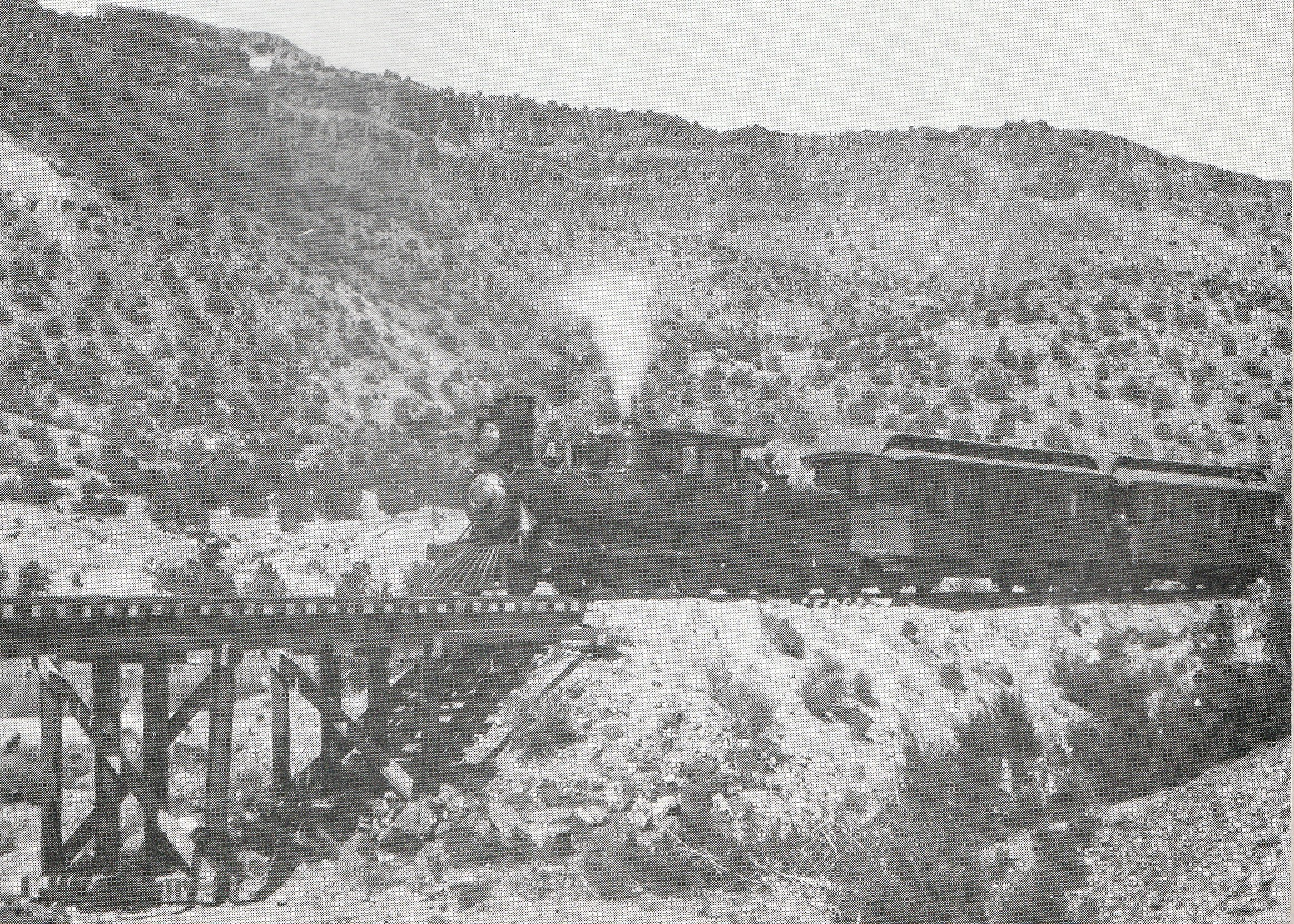
In White Rock Canyon just north of Buckman, 1890 by W H Jackson

Passenger trains were pulled by 4-4-0s until replaced by class T-12 4-6-0s in the early 1900s. Freight trains pulled by C-class 2-8-0s carried livestock, wool, fruit, chili, beans, sugar, flour, manufactured goods, timber coal, petroleum products, cement, minerals and ores. Heavier rail was laid in 1928 so class K-28 2-8-2s could replace the older locomotives and eliminate need for helper engines. In later years a daily mixed train typically operated providing connections at Alamosa to an overnight standard gauge train to and from Denver. A meal stop was often scheduled at Embudo. In 1890 a trip from Santa Fe to Antonito was scheduled to take eight hours. In 1941 the same trip on train 426 took seven hours and fifteen minutes, an average speed of 17.3 miles per hour (27.8 km/h), nevertheless the trip to Denver was easily much quicker though longer by way of the AT&SF.

== Route description ==
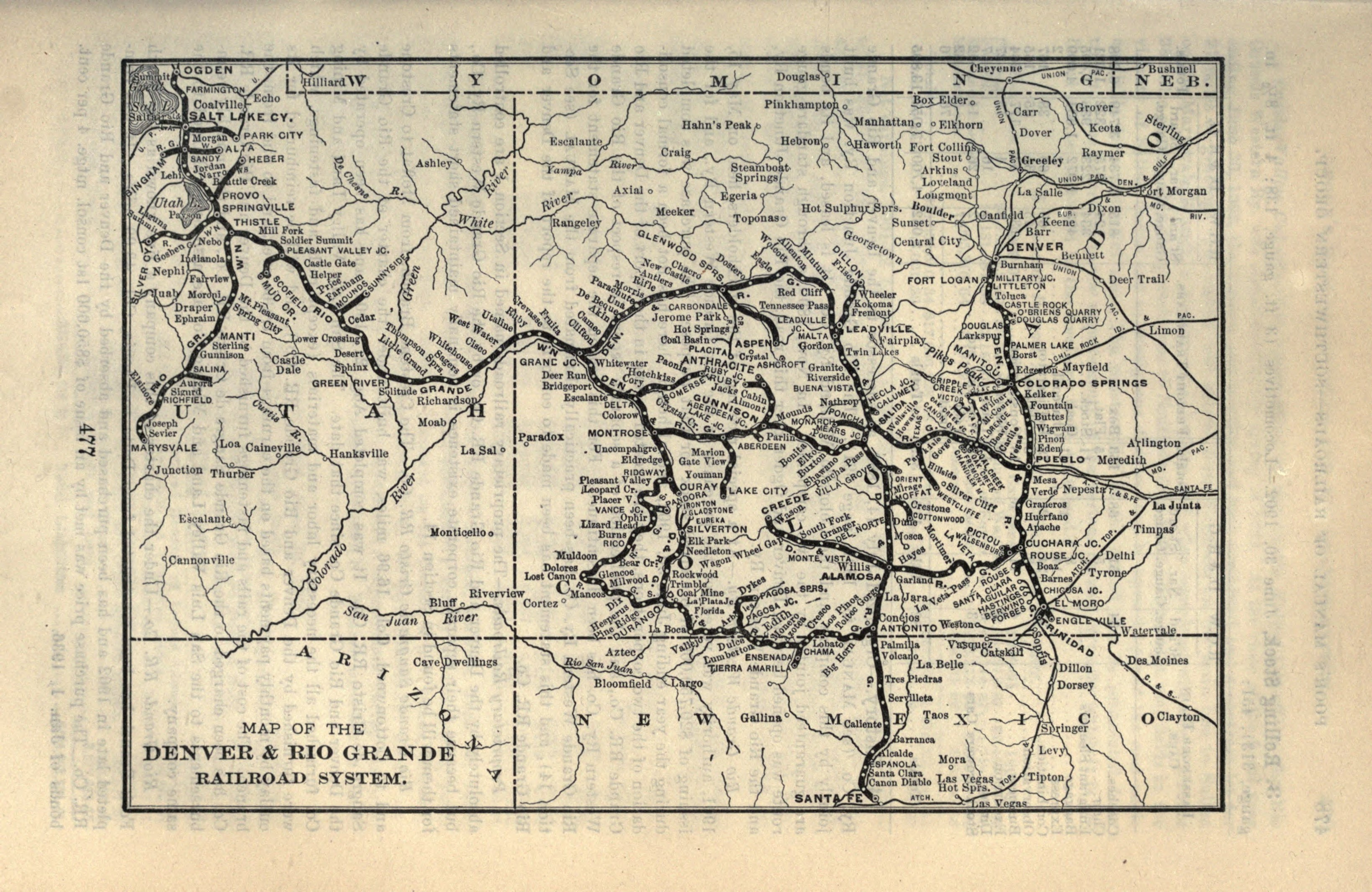
1903 map of the D&RG's system. Antonito and Santa Fe are at bottom right-center.

Just north of Santa Fe's Union Station the line began street running Guadalupe Street before crossing a trestle over the Santa Fe River and entering the line's servicing facilities near the original depot. The railroad then crossed another trestle as it meandered through Santa Fe. The tracks then followed the right-of-way of Rio Grande Boulevard to a crest above the northwestern part of the city. A 22-mile (35 km) two percent grade descended to a townsite at Buckman along the edge of the Caja del Rio where a plank bridge crossed the Rio Grande, providing access to the Pajarito Plateau at the foot of the Jemez Mountains. Today's Old Buckman Road roughly traces this part of the Chili Line and remnants of its grade are still visible. From Buckman, the line closely follows the easy grades alongside the Rio Grande northward, through an iron truss bridge crossing the river at Otowi and passing through Santa Clara and Española. From Embudo the line began its steep and twisting climb through the Rio Grande Gorge, rising 1128 ft (371m) in 7.5 miles (12.1 km) of mostly 4% gradient to Barranca, where alternating but steady 1% grades led the line away from the Rio Grande towards Antonito and Alamosa.

== Popular culture ==
- The Texas Rangers (1936 film) had outdoor scenes shot in and around Española, with a T-12 ten-wheeler redecorated to resemble its 1890 appearance and labelled as "Old Montezuma D&RG No. 1" for the occasion.
- The Light That Failed (1939 film) had scenes filmed in White Rock Canyon between Otowi and Buckman. The producers had decided that the area would stand in for a British military campaign along the Nile flowing through Sudan, with D&RGW 2-8-0 no.343 disguised with sand bags and other alterations as an Egyptian locomotive pulling an armored train. The river, alongside the tracks, was temporarily dammed to raise the water level, and 300 people from the local Tewa pueblos were cast as a Sudanese rebel army.
