= Great Blizzard of 1899 =

1899 blizzard in the United States

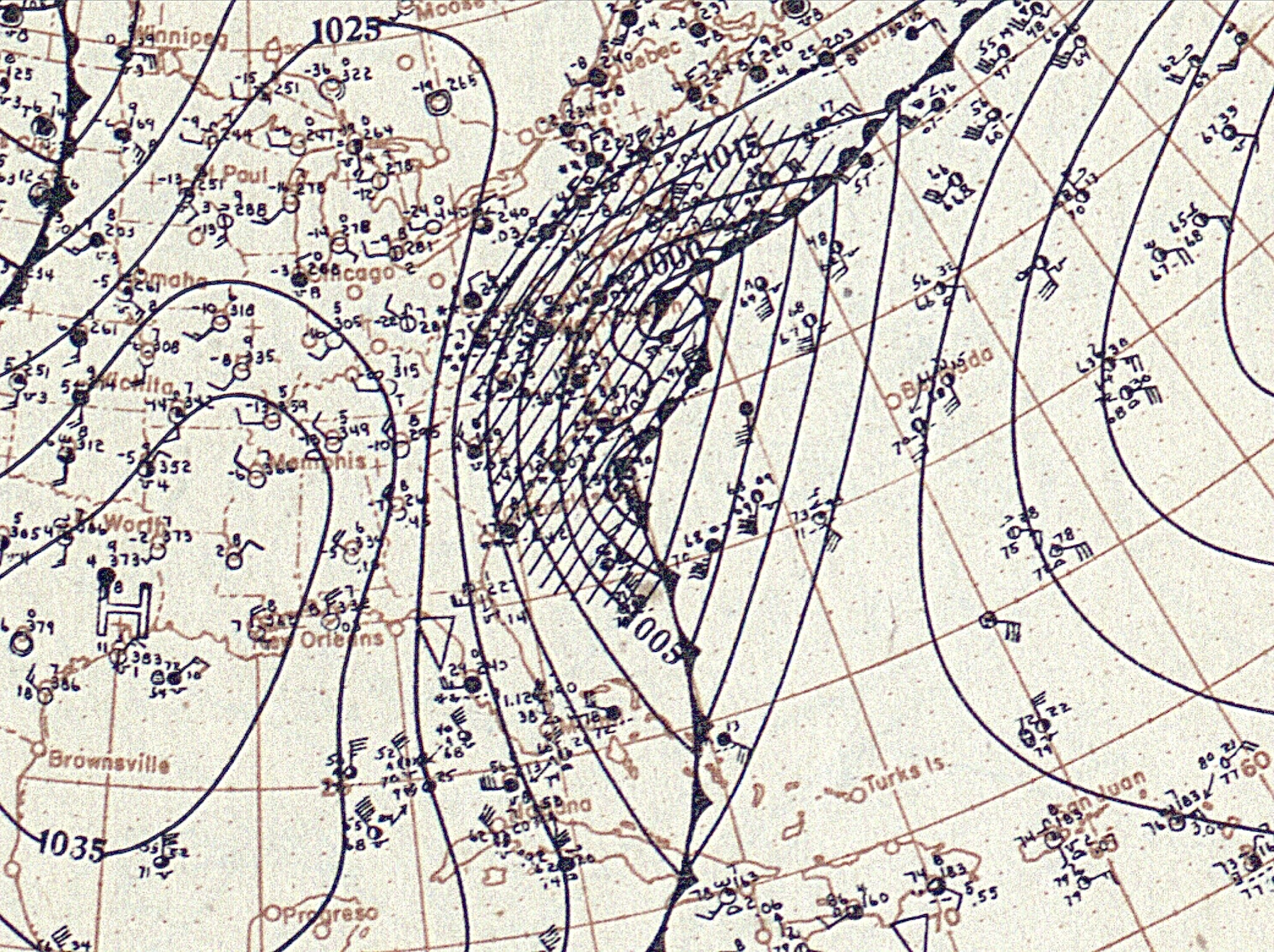
- Surface weather analysis on February 13, showing the storm off the U.S East Coast

Meteorological history
- Formed: February 10, 1899
- Dissipated: February 14, 1899

Overall effects
- Fatalities: Over 100
- Areas affected: United States, particularly east of the Rocky Mountains

The Great Blizzard of 1899, also known as the Great Arctic Outbreak of 1899 and the St. Valentine's Day Blizzard, was an exceptionally severe winter weather event that affected most of the United States, particularly east of the Rocky Mountains. On February 11, Swift Current in present-day Saskatchewan reported a record-high barometric pressure of 31.42 inches of mercury (1,064 mb).

== Temperatures and records ==
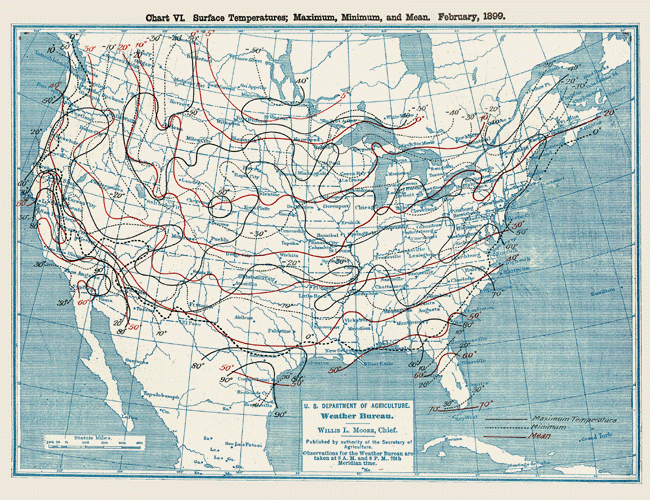
Temperature map of the United States during the storm

For the 1895–2017 period of record:

- February 1899 was the second-coldest February in the contiguous U.S. (behind only 1936). The average temperature was 25.50 °F (−3.61 °C), which was 8.36 °F (4.64 °C) colder than the 1895–2017 average of 33.86 °F (1.03 °C) and 0.27 °F (0.15 °C) warmer than February 1936.
- December 1898 through February 1899 was the third-coldest meteorological winter in the contiguous U.S., with the coldest winter occurring in 1978–79 and the second-coldest in 1935–36. The average temperature was 27.95 °F (−2.25 °C), which was 4.47 °F (2.48 °C) colder than the 1895–2017 average of 32.42 °F (0.23 °C) and 1.33 °F (0.74 °C) warmer than the 1978–79 winter.
- February 1899 was the coldest February in Kansas, Missouri, and Wyoming.
- February 1899 was the second-coldest February in Arkansas, Colorado, Mississippi, Montana, Nebraska, Oklahoma, and South Dakota.

The following low temperatures occurred during the last ten days of January and the first three weeks of February. The climate regions are defined by the National Centers for Environmental Information.

=== Northeast ===
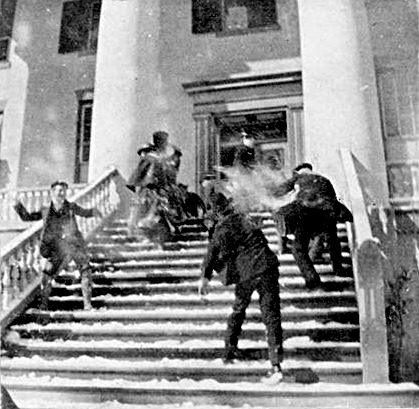
Snowball fight on the steps of the Florida State Capitol in Tallahassee on February 10, 1899

For the 1895–2017 period of record in the Northeast climate region:

- February 1899 was the 18th-coldest February. The average temperature was 18.1 °F (−7.7 °C), which was 4.7 °F (2.6 °C) colder than the 1895–2017 average of 22.8 °F (−5.1 °C) and 7.7 °F (4.3 °C) warmer than the coldest February of 1934.
- December 1898 through February 1899 was the 24th-coldest meteorological winter. The average temperature was 20.9 °F (−6.2 °C), which was 2.6 °F (1.4 °C) colder than the 1895–2017 average of 23.5 °F (−4.7 °C) and 5.5 °F (3.1 °C) warmer than the coldest winter of 1917–18.

==== Connecticut ====
Equal 16th-coldest February, 1895–2017.

- Hartford: −6 °F (−21.1 °C)

==== Delaware ====
Ninth-coldest February, 1895–2017.

- Milford: −12 °F (−24.4 °C)
- Millsboro: −10 °F (−23.3 °C)
- Newark: −12 °F (−24.4 °C) all-time record as of December 31, 2006
- Seaford: −11 °F (−23.9 °C)
- Wilmington: −2 °F (−18.9 °C)
- Wyoming: −14 °F (−25.6 °C)
- Temperatures not available: Dover, Elsmere, Georgetown, Middletown, New Castle, Smyrna

==== Maine ====
28th-coldest February, 1895–2017.

- Flaggstaff: −30 °F (−34.4 °C)
- Gardiner: −15 °F (−26.1 °C)
- Kineo: −24 °F (−31.1 °C)
- North Bridgton: −20 °F (−28.9 °C)
- Portland: −6 °F (−21.1 °C)
- Temperatures not available: Auburn, Augusta, Bangor, Biddeford, Caribou, Lewiston, Saco, Sanford, South Portland, Westbrook

==== Maryland ====
Eighth-coldest February, 1895–2017.

- Annapolis: −6 °F (−21.1 °C)
- Baltimore: −7 °F (−21.7 °C) tied with February 9, 1934, January 29, 1963, January 17, 1982, and January 22, 1984, for all-time record
- College Park: −9 °F (−22.8 °C)
- Frederick: −10 °F (−23.3 °C)
- Princess Anne: −10 °F (−23.3 °C) All-time record tied with January 28, 1987
- Hagerstown: −19 °F (−28.3 °C)
- Laurel: −18 °F (−27.8 °C) all-time record for February
- Solomons: −5 °F (−20.6 °C) all-time record
- Temperatures not available: Bowie, Gaithersburg, Salisbury

==== Massachusetts ====
25th-coldest February, 1895–2017.

- Boston: −4 °F (−20.0 °C)
- Milton: −10 °F (−23.3 °C)
- Worcester: −10 °F (−23.3 °C)

==== New Hampshire ====
33rd-coldest February, 1895–2017.

- Concord: −18 °F (−27.8 °C)
- Grafton: −27 °F (−32.8 °C)
- Keene: −28 °F (−33.3 °C)
- Nashua: −19 °F (−28.3 °C)
- Temperatures not available: Derry, Dover, Hudson, Londonderry, Manchester, Merrimack, Rochester, Salem

==== New Jersey ====
Eleventh-coldest February, 1895–2017.

- Atlantic City: −7 °F (−21.7 °C)
- Cape May: −3 °F (−19.4 °C)
- Trenton: −10 °F (−23.3 °C)

==== New York ====
Equal 25th-coldest February, 1895–2017.

- Albany: −8 °F (−22.2 °C)
- Buffalo: −8 °F (−22.2 °C)
- New York City - Central Park: −6 °F (−21.1 °C)
- Rochester: −7 °F (−21.7 °C)
- Watertown: −24 °F (−31.1 °C)
- West Point: −5 °F (−20.6 °C)

==== Pennsylvania ====
Twelfth-coldest February, 1895–2017.

- Erie: −12 °F (−24.4 °C)
- Hamburg: −13 °F (−25.0 °C) tied for all-time record for February
- Harrisburg: −13 °F (−25.0 °C) all-time record for February
- Philadelphia: −6 °F (−21.1 °C)
- Pittsburgh: −20 °F (−28.9 °C) all-time record for February
- Scranton: −15 °F (−26.1 °C)
- State College: −20 °F (−28.9 °C) all-time record
- Temperatures not available: Allentown, Bethlehem, Lancaster, Reading

==== Rhode Island ====
Fourteenth-coldest February, 1895–2017.

- Kingston: −10 °F (−23.3 °C)
- Providence: not available

==== Vermont ====
37th-coldest February, 1895–2017.

- Burlington: −10 °F (−23.3 °C)
- Montpelier: not available
- Northfield: −25 °F (−31.7 °C)

=== Northern Rockies and Plains ===
For the 1895–2017 period of record in the Northern Rockies and Plains climate region:

- February 1899 was the second-coldest February, behind only 1936. The average temperature was 6.3 °F (−14.3 °C), which was 14.5 °F (8.1 °C) colder than the 1895–2017 average of 20.8 °F (−6.2 °C) and 7.0 °F (3.9 °C) warmer than February 1936.
- December 1898 through February 1899 was the eighth-coldest meteorological winter. The average temperature was 13.1 °F (−10.5 °C), which was 6.2 °F (3.4 °C) colder than the 1895–2017 average of 19.3 °F (−7.1 °C) and 3.8 °F (2.1 °C) warmer than the coldest winter of 1978–79.

==== Montana ====
Second-coldest February, 1895–2017.

- Adel: −50 °F (−45.6 °C) second-coldest ever
- Big Timber: −44 °F (−42.2 °C)
- Billings (water treatment plant): −49 °F (−45.0 °C) all-time record
- Butte: −28 °F (−33.3 °C)
- Chinook: −46 °F (−43.3 °C)
- Ekalaka: −39 °F (−39.4 °C)
- Fort Keogh: −55 °F (−48.3 °C)
- Fort Logan: −61 °F (−51.7 °C) all-time record (as of November 19, 1978)
- Glasgow:−50 °F (−45.6 °C)
- Great Falls: −35 °F (−37.2 °C)
- Havre: −43 °F (−41.7 °C)
- Helena: −30 °F (−34.4 °C)
- Kalispell: −26 °F (−32.2 °C)
- Miles City: −49 °F (−45.0 °C)
- Missoula: −22 °F (−30.0 °C)
- Temperatures not available: Anaconda, Bozeman

==== Nebraska ====
Second-coldest February, 1895–2017.

- Alliance: −40 °F (−40.0 °C)
- Bridgeport: −47 °F (−43.9 °C) all-time record for Nebraska, which Oshkosh tied on December 22, 1989
- Culbertson: −38 °F (−38.9 °C) all-time record
- Hay Springs: −41 °F (−40.6 °C) all-time record as of July 31, 2012
- Imperial: −35 °F (−37.2 °C) all-time record
- Kimball: −30 °F (−34.4 °C) all-time record for February
- Lincoln: −26 °F (−32.2 °C) tied for all-time record for February
- Lodgepole: −36 °F (−37.8 °C) tied with February 8, 1936, for all-time record
- North Platte: −35 °F (−37.2 °C) tied with January 15, 1888, for all-time record
- Omaha: −26 °F (−32.2 °C) all-time record for February
- Scottsbluff: −45 °F (−42.8 °C) all-time record
- Springview: −30 °F (−34.4 °C) tied for all-time record for February
- Valentine: −37 °F (−38.3 °C) all-time record for February

==== North Dakota ====
Fourth-coldest February, 1895–2017.

- Ashley: −46 °F (−43.3 °C) tied with February 1, 1893, and February 2, 1905, for second-lowest ever
- Bismarck: −37 °F (−38.3 °C)
- Bottineau: −46 °F (−43.3 °C)
- Dickinson: −38 °F (−38.9 °C)
- Fargo: −35 °F (−37.2 °C)
- Grand Forks: −39 °F (−39.4 °C)
- Jamestown: −36 °F (−37.8 °C)
- Minnewaukan: −55 °F (−48.3 °C) all-time record
- Minot: −39 °F (−39.4 °C)
- Mohall: −48 °F (−44.4 °C) tied with March 14, 1897, and February 9, 1900, for all-time record
- Williston: −41 °F (−40.6 °C)
- Temperatures not available: Mandan, West Fargo

==== South Dakota ====
Second-coldest February, 1895–2017.

- Aberdeen: −35 °F (−37.2 °C)
- Alexandria: −38 °F (−38.9 °C) tied with February 2, 1905, and January 13, 1916, for second-lowest ever and tied for all-time record for February
- Bowdle: −39 °F (−39.4 °C) all-time record as of April 30, 1944
- Brookings: −41 °F (−40.6 °C) tied with January 12, 1912, for all-time record
- Camp Crook: −40 °F (−40.0 °C)
- De Smet: −40 °F (−40.0 °C) second-lowest ever and all-time record for February
- Flandreau: −38 °F (−38.9 °C) all-time record for February
- Forestburg: −46 °F (−43.3 °C) all-time record
- Highmore: −40 °F (−40.0 °C)
- Hot Springs: −41 °F (−40.6 °C) tied with January 11, 1909, for all-time record
- Howard: −42 °F (−41.1 °C) tied with February 2, 1917, for all-time record for February
- Huron: −37 °F (−38.3 °C) all-time record for February
- Kennebec: −45 °F (−42.8 °C) all-time record
- LaDelle: −47 °F (−43.9 °C) tied with January 12, 1912, for all-time record (as of October 27, 1974)
- Mitchell: −39 °F (−39.4 °C) tied with February 2, 1905, for second-lowest ever (as of March 31, 2003)
- Oelrichs: −41 °F (−40.6 °C) all-time record
- Pierre: −39 °F (−39.4 °C)
- Rapid City: −34 °F (−36.7 °C)
- Sioux Falls: −42 °F (−41.1 °C) all-time record
- Spearfish: −29 °F (−33.9 °C)
- Watertown: −38 °F (−38.9 °C) tied for all-time record for February
- Wentworth: −40 °F (−40.0 °C) all-time record (as of August 14, 2006)
- Wessington Springs: −39 °F (−39.4 °C) all-time record
- Yankton: −30 °F (−34.4 °C)
- Temperatures not available: Vermillion

==== Wyoming ====
Coldest February, 1895–2017.

- Basin: −51 °F (−46.1 °C) all-time record
- Cheyenne: −28 °F (−33.3 °C)
- Evanston: −30 °F (−34.4 °C)
- Laramie: −40 °F (−40.0 °C)
- Lovell: −48 °F (−44.4 °C) all-time record
- Sheridan: −45 °F (−42.8 °C)
- Yellowstone National Park, Mammoth Hot Springs: −35 °F (−37.2 °C) tied for all-time record for February
- Temperatures not available: Casper, Gillette, Green River, Jackson, Riverton, Rock Springs

=== Northwest ===
For the 1895–2017 period of record in the Northwest climate region:

- February 1899 was the 13th-coldest February. The average temperature was 26.4 °F (−3.1 °C), which was 5.1 °F (2.8 °C) colder than the 1895–2017 average of 31.5 °F (−0.28 °C) and 4.8 °F (2.7 °C) warmer than the coldest February of 1929.
- December 1898 through February 1899 was the 19th-coldest meteorological winter. The average temperature was 26.5 °F (−3.1 °C), which was 2.8 °F (1.6 °C) colder than the 1895–2017 average of 29.3 °F (−1.5 °C) and 6.2 °F (3.4 °C) warmer than the coldest winter of 1948–49.

==== Idaho ====
Nineteenth-coldest February, 1895–2017.

- Boise: −9 °F (−22.8 °C)
- Idaho Falls: −29 °F (−33.9 °C)
- Lewiston: −8 °F (−22.2 °C)
- Riggins: −8 °F (−22.2 °C) all-time record for February
- Temperatures not available: Caldwell, Coeur d'Alene, Meridian, Nampa, Post Falls, Twin Falls

==== Oregon ====
Fourteenth-coldest February, 1895–2017.

- Corvallis: −5 °F (−20.6 °C) all-time record for February
- Eugene: 0 °F (−17.8 °C)
- Hillsboro/Forest Grove: −1 °F (−18.3 °C)
- Portland: 9 °F (−12.8 °C)
- Salem: 3 °F (−16.1 °C)
- Temperatures not available: Beaverton, Bend, Gresham, Medford, Springfield

==== Washington ====
Equal eleventh-coldest February, 1895–2017.

- Pullman: −18 °F (−27.8 °C)
- Seattle: 12 °F (−11.1 °C)
- Spokane: −12 °F (−24.4 °C)
- Tacoma: 9 °F (−12.8 °C)
- Tri-Cities: −6 °F (−21.1 °C)
- Vancouver: 6 °F (−14.4 °C)
- Temperatures not available: Bellevue, Everett, Federal Way, Kent, Renton, Yakima

=== Ohio Valley ===
For the 1895–2017 period of record in the Ohio Valley climate region:

- February 1899 was the equal third-coldest February alongside 1905, with the coldest being 1978 and the second-coldest 1895. The average temperature was 22.20 °F (−5.44 °C), which was 10.60 °F (5.89 °C) colder than the 1895–2017 average of 32.80 °F (0.44 °C) and 1.90 °F (1.06 °C) warmer than February 1978.
- December 1898 through February 1899 was the ninth-coldest meteorological winter. The average temperature was 27.0 °F (−2.8 °C), which was 5.0 °F (2.8 °C) colder than the 1895–2017 average of 32.0 °F (0.0 °C) and 3.5 °F (1.9 °C) warmer than the coldest winter of 1977–78.

==== Illinois ====
Sixth-coldest February, 1895–2017.

- Albion: −21 °F (−29.4 °C) all-time record as of December 31, 2006
- Aurora: −22 °F (−30.0 °C)
- Champaign: −25 °F (−31.7 °C) tied with February 13, 1905, January 19, 1994, and January 5, 1999, for all-time record
- Chicago: −21 °F (−29.4 °C) all-time record for February
- Elgin: −23 °F (−30.6 °C)
- Fairfield: −21 °F (−29.4 °C) all-time record for February
- Joliet: −20 °F (−28.9 °C)
- Mt. Vernon: −22 °F (−30.0 °C) tied with February 10, 1982, for all-time record
- Nashville: −21 °F (−29.4 °C) tied with December 22, 1989, for all-time record
- Ottawa: −23 °F (−30.6 °C) tied for all-time record for February
- Palestine: −27 °F (−32.8 °C) all-time record
- Peoria: −22 °F (−30.0 °C)
- Sparta: −23 °F (−30.6 °C) all-time record as of December 31, 2006
- Springfield: −21 °F (−29.4 °C)
- Temperatures not available: Cicero, Naperville, Rockford, Waukegan

==== Indiana ====
Equal seventh-coldest February, 1895–2017.

- Anderson: −19 °F (−28.3 °C) all-time record for February
- Angola: −20 °F (−28.9 °C) all-time record for February
- Bloomington: −20 °F (−28.9 °C) all-time record for February
- Columbus: −27 °F (−32.8 °C) tied with January 13, 1912, for all-time record
- Evansville: −15 °F (−26.1 °C)
- Fort Wayne: −19 °F (−28.3 °C) all-time record for February
- Hammond: −22 °F (−30.0 °C)
- Indianapolis: −18 °F (−27.8 °C)
- Lafayette: −22 °F (−30.0 °C)
- Oolitic: −18 °F (−27.8 °C) tied for all-time record for February
- Shelbyville: −20 °F (−28.9 °C) all-time record for February
- South Bend: −20 °F (−28.9 °C) all-time record for February
- Vincennes: −19 °F (−28.3 °C) tied with February 2, 1951, for all-time record
- Washington: −19 °F (−28.3 °C) tied with December 22–23, 1989, for all-time record
- Temperatures not available: Carmel, Fishers, Gary

==== Kentucky ====
Third-coldest February, 1895–2017.

- Ashland: −23 °F (−30.6 °C) tied for all-time record for February
- Bowling Green: −17 °F (−27.2 °C)
- Georgetown: −26 °F (−32.2 °C) (short period of record: 1896–1902)
- Henderson: −13 °F (−25.0 °C)
- Hopkinsville: −19 °F (−28.3 °C)
- Lexington: −20 °F (−28.9 °C) all-time record for February
- Louisville: −14 °F (−25.6 °C)
- Maysville: −22 °F (−30.0 °C) all-time record for February
- Owensboro: −21 °F (−29.4 °C)
- Richmond: −24 °F (−31.1 °C)
- Temperatures not available: Covington, Florence

==== Missouri ====
Coldest February, 1895–2017.

- Bowling Green: −26 °F (−32.2 °C) all-time record
- Columbia: −26 °F (−32.2 °C) all-time record
- Caruthersville: −22 °F (−30.0 °C) all-time record
- Jefferson City: −25 °F (−31.7 °C) all-time record
- Kansas City: −22 °F (−30.0 °C) all-time record for February
- Marble Hill: −31 °F (−35.0 °C) all-time record
- Maryville: −28 °F (−33.3 °C) tied for all-time record for February
- Oregon: −26 °F (−32.2 °C) second-lowest ever
- Poplar Bluff: −25 °F (−31.7 °C) all-time record
- Sedalia: −30 °F (−34.4 °C) all-time record
- Springfield: −29 °F (−33.9 °C) all-time record
- St. Charles: −22 °F (−30.0 °C)
- St. Louis: −16 °F (−26.7 °C)
- Warrensburg: −26 °F (−32.2 °C) tied with February 13, 1905, for all-time record
- Temperatures not available: Independence, Lee's Summit, St. Joseph, St. Peters

==== Ohio ====
Tenth-coldest February, 1895–2017.

- Akron: −20 °F (−28.9 °C) all-time record for February
- Bellefontaine: −21 °F (−29.4 °C) all-time record for February
- Canton: −20 °F (−28.9 °C)
- Celina: −24 °F (−31.1 °C) all-time record
- Cincinnati: −17 °F (−27.2 °C) all-time record for February
- Circleville: −21 °F (−29.4 °C) all-time record for February
- Cleveland: −16 °F (−26.7 °C)
- Columbus: −20 °F (−28.9 °C) all-time record for February
- Dayton: −28 °F (−33.3 °C) all-time record
- Hillsboro: −30 °F (−34.4 °C) all-time record
- McArthur: −38 °F (−38.9 °C) all-time record (as of February 28, 1935)
- McConnellsville: −29 °F (−33.9 °C) all-time record for February (as of March 31, 2012)
- Milligan: −39 °F (−39.4 °C) all-time record for Ohio
- Napoleon: −22 °F (−30.0 °C) all-time record for February
- Portsmouth: −18 °F (−27.8 °C) all-time record for February
- Toledo: −15 °F (−26.1 °C)
- Waverly: −29 °F (−33.9 °C) all-time record for February
- Zanesville: −20 °F (−28.9 °C) all-time record for February
- Temperatures not available: Lorain, Parma, Youngstown

==== Tennessee ====
Fourth-coldest February, 1895–2017.

- Carthage: −15 °F (−26.1 °C) all-time record for February
- Chattanooga: −10 °F (−23.3 °C) tied with January 31, 1966, and January 21, 1985, for all-time record
- Clarksville: −14 °F (−25.6 °C) all-time record for February
- Elizabethton: −17 °F (−27.2 °C) all-time record for February
- Franklin: −15 °F (−26.1 °C) all-time record for February
- Jackson: −13 °F (−25.0 °C)
- Knoxville: −10 °F (−23.3 °C) tied for all-time record for February
- McMinnville: −26 °F (−32.2 °C) all-time record
- Memphis: −9 °F (−22.8 °C)
- Murfreesboro: −16 °F (−26.7 °C) second-lowest ever and all-time record for February
- Nashville: −13 °F (−25.0 °C) tied with February 2, 1951, for all-time record
- Newport: −16 °F (−26.7 °C) all-time record for February
- Rogersville: −17 °F (−27.2 °C) all-time record for February
- Sewanee: −11 °F (−23.9 °C) all-time record
- Tellico Plains: −15 °F (−26.1 °C) all-time record
- Tullahoma: −20 °F (−28.9 °C) second-lowest ever
- Union City: −16 °F (−26.7 °C) second-lowest for February
- Temperatures not available: Bartlett, Bristol TN, Cookeville, Covington, Crossville, Gatlinburg, Johnson City, Kingsport

==== West Virginia ====
Eighth-coldest February, 1895–2017.

- Beckley: −20 °F (−28.9 °C) all-time record for February
- Buckhannon: −31 °F (−35.0 °C) all-time record
- Glenville: −29 °F (−33.9 °C) all-time record
- Hamlin: −27 °F (−32.8 °C) all-time record for February
- Huntington: −24 °F (−31.1 °C) all-time record
- Marlinton: −23 °F (−30.6 °C) all-time record for February
- Martinsburg: −13 °F (−25.0 °C)
- Moorefield: −25 °F (−31.7 °C) all-time record for February
- Morgantown: −25 °F (−31.7 °C) all-time record
- New Cumberland: −23 °F (−30.6 °C) all-time record
- Parkersburg: −27 °F (−32.8 °C) all-time record
- Parsons: −18 °F (−27.8 °C) tied with February 28, 1934, for all-time record for February
- Philippi: −28 °F (−33.3 °C) all-time record for February
- Upper Tract: −22 °F (−30.0 °C) all-time record for February
- Weston: −31 °F (−35.0 °C) all-time record
- Wheeling: −16 °F (−26.7 °C)
- Temperatures not available: Charleston, Clarksburg, Fairmont, Weirton

=== South ===
For the 1895–2017 period of record in the South climate region:

- February 1899 was the second-coldest February behind only 1905. The average temperature was 34.3 °F (1.3 °C), which was 11.3 °F (6.3 °C) colder than the 1895–2017 average of 45.6 °F (7.6 °C) and 0.5 °F (0.28 °C) warmer than February 1905.
- December 1898 through February 1899 is tied with 1904–05 for the coldest meteorological winter of all time. The average temperature was 37.6 °F (3.1 °C), which was 6.1 °F (3.4 °C) colder than the 1895–2017 average of 43.7 °F (6.5 °C).

==== Arkansas ====
Second-coldest February, 1895–2017.

- Amity: −12 °F (−24.4 °C) all-time record
- Bee Branch: −16 °F (−26.7 °C)
- Blanchard Springs: −15 °F (−26.1 °C)
- Brinkley: −12 °F (−24.4 °C) all-time record
- Camden: −10 °F (−23.3 °C) tied with January 12, 1918, for all-time record
- Canton: −23 °F (−30.6 °C)
- Conway: −15 °F (−26.1 °C) all-time record
- Corning: −25 °F (−31.7 °C) all-time record
- Fayetteville: −24 °F (−31.1 °C) all-time record
- Fort Smith: −15 °F (−26.1 °C) all-time record
- Gravette: −24 °F (−31.1 °C) second lowest for February
- Hardy: −19 °F (−28.3 °C) all-time record
- Hot Springs: −12 °F (−24.4 °C)
- Jonesboro: −13 °F (−25.0 °C) all-time record for February
- LaCrosse: −20 °F (−28.9 °C)
- Little Rock: −12 °F (−24.4 °C) all-time record
- Mena: −15 °F (−26.1 °C) all-time record
- Mossville: −22 °F (−30.0 °C)
- Newport: −14 °F (−25.6 °C) all-time record for February
- Ozark: −15 °F (−26.1 °C)
- Pine Bluff: −5 °F (−20.6 °C) all-time record for February
- Pocahontas: −22 °F (−30.0 °C) all-time record
- Powell: −24 °F (−31.1 °C)
- Russellville: −15 °F (−26.1 °C) all-time record
- Winslow: −25 °F (−31.7 °C)
- Witts Springs: −24 °F (−31.1 °C)
- Temperatures not available: Benton, Bentonville, Booneville, Eureka Springs, Harrison, Paragould, Rogers, Searcy, Springdale

==== Kansas ====
Coldest February, 1895–2017.

- Abilene: −29 °F (−33.9 °C) all-time record
- Atchison: −25 °F (−31.7 °C) all-time record for February
- Concordia: −25 °F (−31.7 °C) all-time record for February
- Dodge City: −26 °F (−32.2 °C) all-time record
- Concordia: −25 °F (−31.7 °C) all-time record for February
- Fall River Lake: −21 °F (−29.4 °C) tied for all-time record for February
- Lawrence: −25 °F (−31.7 °C) all-time record
- Manhattan: −35 °F (−37.2 °C) all-time record
- Meade: −23 °F (−30.6 °C) all-time record
- Norwich: −22 °F (−30.0 °C) all-time record
- Olathe: −29 °F (−33.9 °C) all-time record
- Pratt: −25 °F (−31.7 °C) all-time record
- Salina: −27 °F (−32.8 °C)
- Sedan: −24 °F (−31.1 °C) all-time record for February
- Topeka: −25 °F (−31.7 °C) all-time record for February and second-lowest ever
- Wellington: −20 °F (−28.9 °C) all-time record
- Wichita: −22 °F (−30.0 °C) all-time record
- Yates Center: −28 °F (−33.3 °C) all-time record
- Temperatures not available: Kansas City, Lenexa, Overland Park, Shawnee

==== Louisiana ====
Fourth-coldest February, 1895–2017.

- Alexandria: 3 °F (−16.1 °C) all-time record
- Bastrop: −12 °F (−24.4 °C) all-time record
- Baton Rouge: 2 °F (−16.7 °C) all-time record
- Franklin: 8 °F (−13.3 °C) all-time record
- Jennings: 9 °F (−12.8 °C) all-time record
- Lafayette: 6 °F (−14.4 °C) all-time record for February
- Lake Charles: 3 °F (−16.1 °C) all-time record
- Minden: −16 °F (−26.7 °C) all-time record for Louisiana
- Monroe: −3 °F (−19.4 °C)
- New Orleans: 6 °F (−14.4 °C) all-time record
- Plain Dealing: −14 °F (−25.6 °C) all-time record as of March 31, 1999
- Ruston: −3 °F (−19.4 °C) tied for all-time record for February
- Shreveport: −5 °F (−20.6 °C) all-time record

==== Mississippi ====
Second-coldest February, 1895–2017.

- Aberdeen: −15 °F (−26.1 °C) all-time record
- Biloxi: 1 °F (−17.2 °C)
- Booneville: −9 °F (−22.8 °C) all-time record for February and second-lowest ever
- Brookhaven: −10 °F (−23.3 °C) all-time record
- Canton: −3 °F (−19.4 °C) all-time record for February
- Hattiesburg: −1 °F (−18.3 °C) all-time record
- Kosciusko: −8 °F (−22.2 °C) all-time record
- Louisville: −13 °F (−25.0 °C) all-time record
- Meridian: −6 °F (−21.1 °C) all-time record
- Natchez: 4 °F (−15.6 °C) tied with January 27, 1940, for all-time record
- State University (Starkville): −12 °F (−24.4 °C) all-time record
- Vicksburg: −1 °F (−18.3 °C)
- Temperatures not available: Clarksdale, Cornith, Greenville, Gulfport, Hernando, Jackson, Oxford, Southaven, Tupelo

==== Oklahoma ====
Second-coldest February, 1895–2017.

- Anadarko: −17 °F (−27.2 °C) tied with January 4, 1947, and December 23, 1989, for all-time record (as of December 4, 2016)
- Beaver: −25 °F (−31.7 °C) all-time record
- Guthrie: −17 °F (−27.2 °C) all-time record for February
- Healdton: −14 °F (−25.6 °C) all-time record
- Hennessey: −17 °F (−27.2 °C) second-lowest ever (as of March 31, 2012)
- Newkirk: −22 °F (−30.0 °C) all-time record (as of September 13, 2012)
- Norman: −17 °F (−27.2 °C) tied with February 13, 1905, for all-time record
- Oklahoma City: −17 °F (−27.2 °C) all-time record
- Perry: −17 °F (−27.2 °C) all-time record for February
- Stillwater: −17 °F (−27.2 °C)
- Temperatures not available: Enid, Lawton, Tulsa

==== Texas ====
Third-coldest February, 1895–2018.

- Abilene: −6 °F (−21.1 °C) second all-time record for February
- Amarillo: −16 °F (−26.7 °C) all-time record
- Austin: −1 °F (−18.3 °C) second-lowest ever
- Blanco: −6 °F (−21.1 °C) tied with January 31, 1949, for all-time record
- Brenham: 0 °F (−17.8 °C) all-time record for February
- Brownsville: 12 °F (−11.1 °C) all-time record
- College Station: 1 °F (−17.2 °C) all-time record for February
- Conroe: 6 °F (−14.4 °C) tied with February 2, 1951, for all-time record for February
- Corpus Christi: 11 °F (−11.7 °C) all-time record
- Crosbyton: −14 °F (−25.6 °C) all-time record
- Dallas & Fort Worth: −8 °F (−22.2 °C) all-time record
- Danevang: 3 °F (−16.1 °C) all-time record
- El Paso: 5 °F (−15.0 °C)
- Galveston: 8 °F (−13.3 °C) all-time record
- Hallettsville: 5 °F (−15.0 °C) tied with December 23, 1989, for all-time record
- Houston: 6 °F (−14.4 °C) second-lowest ever
- Marshall: −9 °F (−22.8 °C) all-time record
- New Braunfels: 2 °F (−16.7 °C) tied with January 31, 1949, and December 23, 1989, for all-time record (as of December 19, 2017)
- San Antonio: 4 °F (−15.6 °C) second-lowest ever
- Temple: −4 °F (−20.0 °C) tied with December 23 and 24, 1989, for all-time record (as of November 8, 2003)
- Tulia: −23 °F (−30.6 °C) all-time record for Texas, which Seminole tied on February 8, 1933
- Tyler (Pounds Regional Airport): 0 °F (−17.8 °C) all-time record
- Temperatures not avalibile: Beaumont, Del Rio, Eagle Pass, Laredo, McAllen, Midland, San Angelo, Odessa, Victoria, Wichita Falls

=== Southeast ===
For the 1895–2017 period of record in the Southeast climate region:

- February 1899 was the seventeenth-coldest February. The average temperature was 42.8 °F (6.0 °C), which was 4.7 °F (2.6 °C) colder than the 1895–2017 average of 47.5 °F (8.6 °C) and 5.5 °F (3.1 °C) warmer than the coldest February of 1895.
- December 1898 through February 1899 was the 21st-coldest meteorological winter. The average temperature was 44.4 °F (6.9 °C), which was 2.4 °F (1.3 °C) colder than the 1895–2017 average of 46.7 °F (8.2 °C) and 3.5 °F (1.9 °C) warmer than the coldest winter of 1976–77.

==== Alabama ====
Fifth-coldest February, 1895–2017.

- Ashville: −12 °F (−24.4 °C)
- Birmingham: −10 °F (−23.3 °C) all-time record
- Decatur: −12 °F (−24.4 °C)
- Florence: −11 °F (−23.9 °C)
- Gadsden: −13 °F (−25.0 °C)
- Hamilton: −16 °F (−26.7 °C)
- Mobile: −1 °F (−18.3 °C) all-time record
- Montgomery: −5 °F (−20.6 °C) all-time record
- Muscle Shoals: −11 °F (−23.9 °C)
- Oneonta: −15 °F (−26.1 °C) all-time record
- Rock Mills: −10 °F (−23.3 °C)
- Scottsboro: −13 °F (−25.0 °C) all-time record
- Talladega: −10 °F (−23.3 °C) all-time record
- Tuscaloosa: −7 °F (−21.7 °C)
- Valley Head: −17 °F (−27.2 °C) second-lowest ever
- Temperatures not available: Anniston, Auburn, Cullman, Dothan, Fairhope, Gadsden, Greenville, Hoover, Huntsville, Madison, Troy

==== District of Columbia ====
- Washington: −15 °F (−26.1 °C) all-time record

==== Florida ====
51st-coldest February, 1895–2017.

- Bartow: 22 °F (−5.6 °C) all-time record for February
- Brooksville: 18 °F (−8 °C) second all-time record for February
- Crawfordville: 3 °F (−16.1 °C)
- De Funiak Springs: 0 °F (−17.8 °C) all-time record
- Federal Point: 13 °F (−10.6 °C) all-time record for February
- Gainesville: 6 °F (−14.4 °C) all-time record
- Inverness: 18 °F (−7.8 °C) second all-time lowest for February
- Jacksonville: 10 °F (−12.2 °C) all-time record for February
- Jasper: 5 °F (−15.0 °C)
- Key West: 44 °F (6.7 °C) tied for all-time record for February
- Lake Butler: 6 °F (−14.4 °C)
- Lake City: 6 °F (−14.4 °C) all-time record
- Live Oak: 5 °F (−15.0 °C) all-time record
- Macclenny: 8 °F (−13.3 °C)
- Miami: 29 °F (−1.7 °C)
- Miami Beach: 32 °F (0.0 °C)
- Ocala: 12 °F (−11.1 °C) all-time record for February
- Orlando: 20 °F (−6.7 °C)
- Plant City: 20 °F (−6.7 °C) all-time record for February
- Pensacola: 8 °F (−13 °C) all-time record for February
- Saint Leo: 19 °F (−7.2 °C) all-time record for February
- Tallahassee: −2 °F (−18.9 °C) all-time record for Florida
- Tampa: 22 °F (−5.6 °C) tied for all-time record for February
- Tarpon Springs: 20 °F (−6.7 °C) all-time record for February
- Wausau: 2 °F (−16.7 °C)
- West Palm Beach: 28 °F (−2.2 °C) second lowest for February
- Temperatures not available: Bradenton, Daytona Beach, Fernandina Beach, Fort Lauderdale, Fort Myers, Fort Pierce, Hialeah, Lakeland, Melbourne, Naples, Pembroke Pines, Port St. Lucie, Punta Gorda, Sarasota, Stuart, St. Petersburg, Vero Beach

==== Georgia ====
Equal 22nd-coldest February, 1895–2017.

- Atlanta: −9 °F (−22.8 °C) all-time record
- Americus: 3 °F (−16.1 °C) all-time record for February
- Augusta: 3 °F (−16.1 °C) all-time record for February
- Blakely: −1 °F (−18.3 °C) all-time record
- Clayton: −3 °F (−19.4 °C) second-lowest for February
- Columbus: −3 °F (−19.4 °C) all-time record
- Covington: −10 °F (−23.3 °C) all-time record
- Elberton: 9 °F (−13 °C)
- Gainesville: −6 °F (−21.1 °C) all-time record for February
- Rome: −5 °F (−20.6 °C)
- Savannah: 8 °F (−13.3 °C) all-time record for February
- Waycross: 4 °F (−15.6 °C) second-lowest ever
- Temperatures not available: Albany, Athens, Brunswick, Macon, Statesboro, Saluda, Tifton, Toccoa, Valdosta

==== North Carolina ====
Twelfth-coldest February, 1895–2017.

- Cape Hatteras: 12 °F (−11 °C) second-lowest ever for February
- Chapel Hill: −6 °F (−21.1 °C) all-time record for February
- Charlotte: −5 °F (−20.6 °C) tied with December 30, 1880, and January 21, 1985, for all-time record
- Fayetteville: −5 °F (−20.6 °C) all-time record
- Greenville: −2 °F (−18.9 °C) all-time record for February
- Henderson: −9 °F (−22.8 °C) all-time record for February
- Highlands: −19 °F (−28.3 °C) tied with January 21, 1985, for all-time record
- Monroe: −10 °F (−23.3 °C) all-time record
- Mount Airy: 0 °F (−17.8 °C)
- Raleigh: −2 °F (−18.9 °C) all-time record for February
- Salisbury: 4 °F (−15.6 °C)
- Tarboro: −3 °F (−19.4 °C) all-time record for February
- Wilmington: 5 °F (−15.0 °C) all-time record for February
- Temperatures not available: Asheville, Boone, Concord, Durham, Elizabeth City, Gastonia, Greensboro, High Point, Lenoir, Lumberton, Morganton, Winston-Salem

==== South Carolina ====
20th-coldest February, 1895–2017.

- Charleston: 7 °F (−13.9 °C) all-time record at Downtown Charleston
- Columbia: −2 °F (−18.9 °C) all-time record
- Greenville: −5 °F (−20.6 °C) all-time record for February
- Santuc: −11 °F (−23.9 °C) all-time record
- Summerville: −5 °F (−20.6 °C) all time record
- Yemassee: 4 °F (−15.6 °C) all time record for February
- Temperatures not available: Aiken, Florence, Myrtle Beach, Pickens, Rock Hill, Spartanburg, Sumter, Walterboro

==== Virginia ====
Equal sixth-coldest February, 1895–2017.

- Alexandria: −12 °F (−24.4 °C)
- Bedford: −6 °F (−21.1 °C) all-time record for February
- Blacksburg: −11 °F (−23.9 °C) all-time record for February
- Charlottesville: −9 °F (−22.8 °C) all-time record for February
- Dale Enterprise: −22 °F (−30.0 °C) all-time record for February
- Hampton: 4 °F (−15.6 °C)
- Hot Springs: −14 °F (−25.6 °C) all-time record for February
- Lynchburg: −3 °F (−19.4 °C)
- Monterey: −29 °F (−33.9 °C)
- Newport News: 3 °F (−16.1 °C)
- Norfolk: 3 °F (−16.1 °C)
- Richmond: −3 °F (−19.4 °C)
- Staunton: −12 °F (−24.4 °C) all-time record for February
- Virginia Beach/Cape Henry: 5 °F (−15.0 °C)
- Warrenton: −9 °F (−22.8 °C) all-time record for February
- Woodstock: −23 °F (−30.6 °C) all-time record
- Wytheville: −9 °F (−22.8 °C) tied for all-time record for February
- Temperatures not available: Bristol, Chesapeake, Danville, Portsmouth, Roanoke, Wallops Island

=== Southwest ===
For the 1895–2017 period of record in the Southwest climate region:

- February 1899 was the tenth-coldest February. The average temperature was 30.4 °F (−0.9 °C), which was 5.3 °F (2.9 °C) colder than the 1895–2017 average of 35.7 °F (2.1 °C) and 4.4 °F (2.4 °C) warmer than the coldest February of 1903.
- December 1898 through February 1899 was the third-coldest meteorological winter, with the coldest winter being that of 1932–33 and the second-coldest that of 1948–49. The average temperature was 28.7 °F (−1.8 °C), which was 4.7 °F (2.6 °C) colder than the 1895–2017 average of 33.4 °F (0.8 °C) and 1.5 °F (0.83 °C) warmer than 1932–33.

==== Arizona ====
37th-coldest February, 1895–2017.

- Fort Apache: −15 °F (−26.1 °C)
- Fort Defiance: −24 °F (−31.1 °C)
- Mesa: 24 °F (−4.4 °C)
- Peoria: 26 °F (−3.3 °C)
- Phoenix: 24 °F (−4.4 °C) tied for all-time record for February
- Prescott: −12 °F (−24.4 °C) all-time record for February
- Tucson: 17 °F (−8.3 °C) all-time record for February
- Willams: −18 °F (−27.8 °C) all-time record for February
- Temperatures not available: Chandler, Gilbett, Glendale, Scottsdale, Surprise, Tempe

==== Colorado ====
Second-coldest February, 1895–2017.

- Boulder: −14 °F (−25.6 °C)
- Breckenridge: −37 °F (−38.3 °C)
- Colorado Springs: −24 °F (−31.1 °C)
- Denver: −22 °F (−30.0 °C)
- Fort Collins: −38 °F (−38.9 °C)
- Lamar: −30 °F (−34.4 °C) all-time record
- Las Animas: −31 °F (−35.0 °C) all-time record
- Mancos: −26 °F (−32.2 °C) all-time record
- Pueblo: −27 °F (−32.8 °C)
- Wray: −32 °F (−35.6 °C) all-time record for February

==== New Mexico ====
Equal ninth-coldest February, 1895–2017.

- Alamogordo: 14 °F (−10.0 °C)
- Albuquerque: 1 °F (−17.2 °C)
- Buckman: −30 °F (−34.4 °C)
- Clayton (Municipal Airpark): −18 °F (−27.8 °C) all-time record for February
- Las Vegas: −22 °F (−30.0 °C)
- Roswell: −6 °F (−21.1 °C)
- Santa Fe: −5 °F (−20.6 °C)
- Temperatures not available: Clovis, Farmington, Hobbs, Las Cruces, Rio Rancho, South Valley

==== Utah ====
26th-coldest February, 1895–2017.

- Heber: −38 °F (−38.9 °C) all-time record
- Logan: −19 °F (−28.3 °C)
- Salt Lake City: −10 °F (−23.3 °C)
- St. George: 1 °F (−17.2 °C) all-time record for February

=== Upper Midwest ===
For the 1895–2017 period of record in the Upper Midwest climate region:

- February 1899 is tied with 1917 for the third-coldest February, with the coldest occurring in 1936 and the second-coldest in 1904. The average temperature was 6.20 °F (−14.33 °C), which was 10.8 °F (6.0 °C) colder than the 1895–2017 average of 17.0 °F (−8.33 °C) and 5.8 °F (3.2 °C) warmer than February 1936.
- December 1898 through February 1899 was the seventh-coldest meteorological winter. The average temperature was 10.4 °F (−12.0 °C), which was 6.1 °F (3.4 °C) colder than the 1895–2017 average of 16.5 °F (−8.6 °C) and 3.0 °F (1.7 °C) warmer than the coldest winter of 1935–36.

==== Iowa ====
Third-coldest February, 1895–2017.

- Ames: −27 °F (−32.8 °C)
- Cedar Rapids: −25 °F (−31.7 °C)
- Council Bluffs: −24 °F (−31.1 °C)
- Davenport: −23 °F (−30.6 °C)
- Des Moines: −24 °F (−31.1 °C)
- Dubuque: −26 °F (−32.2 °C)
- Iowa City: −26 °F (−32.2 °C)
- New Hampton: −33 °F (−36.1 °C) all-time record for February
- Sioux City: −31 °F (−35.0 °C) all-time record for February
- Spencer: −36 °F (−37.8 °C) all-time record for February
- Waterloo: −27 °F (−32.8 °C)

==== Michigan ====
Equal fifth-coldest February, 1895–2017.

- Ann Arbor: −16 °F (−26.7 °C)
- Baldwin: −49 °F (−45.0 °C) all-time record
- Battle Creek: −24 °F (−31.1 °C) all-time record
- Big Rapids: −36 °F (−37.8 °C) all-time record
- Clinton Charter Township: −20 °F (−28.9 °C)
- Detroit: −13 °F (−25.0 °C)
- Flint: −26 °F (−32.2 °C)
- Frankfort: −32 °F (−35.6 °C) all-time record
- Grand Rapids: −24 °F (−31.1 °C) all-time record
- Hart: −35 °F (−37.2 °C) all-time record
- Hastings: −31 °F (−35.0 °C) all-time record
- Howell: −24 °F (−31.1 °C) tied for all-time record for February
- Ionia: −25 °F (−31.7 °C) tied with January 15, 1963, for all-time record
- Lake City: −41 °F (−40.6 °C) all-time record
- Lansing: −24 °F (−31.1 °C)
- Manistee: −38 °F (−38.9 °C) all-time record
- Muskegon: −30 °F (−34.4 °C) all-time record
- Newberry: −32 °F (−35.6 °C) all-time record
- Owosso: −21 °F (−29.4 °C)
- Saginaw: −20 °F (−28.9 °C)
- Sault Ste Marie: −37 °F (−38.3 °C) tied with February 8, 1934, for all-time record
- South Haven: −22 °F (−30.0 °C) all-time record
- Three Rivers: −20 °F (−28.9 °C) all-time record for February
- Temperatures not available: Dearborn, Livonia, Sterling Heights, Warren

==== Minnesota ====
Fifth-coldest February, 1895–2017.

- Bemidji: −48 °F (−44.4 °C) all-time record for February (as of November 29, 2004)
- Brainerd: −41 °F (−40.6 °C)
- Caledonia: −35 °F (−37.2 °C) tied for all-time record for February
- Detroit Lakes: −53 °F (−47.2 °C) all-time record
- Duluth: −36 °F (−37.8 °C)
- Grand Meadow: −36 °F (−37.8 °C) all-time record for February
- Leech Lake: −59 °F (−50.6 °C)
- Long Prairie: −40 °F (−40.0 °C)
- Milaca: −41 °F (−40.6 °C)
- Milan: −40 °F (−40.0 °C)
- Minneapolis: −33 °F (−36.1 °C) all-time record for February
- Park Rapids: −51 °F (−46.1 °C) tied with February 2, 1996, for all-time record
- Pipestone: −38 °F (−38.9 °C) all-time record for February
- Pokegama Falls: −50 °F (−45.6 °C)
- Saint Paul: −33 °F (−36.1 °C)
- St. Cloud: −35 °F (−37.2 °C)
- Tower: −49 °F (−45.0 °C)
- Zumbrota: −41 °F (−40.6 °C) all-time record for February
- Temperatures not available: Bloomington, Brooklyn Park, Eagan, Plymouth, Rochester, Woodbury

==== Wisconsin ====
Fourth-coldest February, 1895–2017.

- Amherst: −48 °F (−44.4 °C)
- Barron: −48 °F (−44.4 °C)
- Chilton: −34 °F (−36.7 °C) all-time record
- Eau Claire: −40 °F (−40.0 °C) all-time record for February
- Green Bay: −33 °F (−36.1 °C) all-time record for February
- Hayward: −45 °F (−42.8 °C)
- Manitowoc: −29 °F (−33.9 °C) all-time record
- Madison: −28 °F (−33.3 °C)
- Medford: −45 °F (−42.8 °C) all-time record
- Milwaukee: −22 °F (−30.0 °C)
- Neillsville: −46 °F (−43.3 °C) all-time record for February
- New London: −37 °F (−38.3 °C) all-time record
- Osceola: −47 °F (−43.9 °C)
- Oshkosh: −33 °F (−36.1 °C) second-lowest ever
- Port Washington: −29 °F (−33.9 °C) tied with February 3, 1996, for all-time record
- Racine: −21 °F (−29.4 °C)
- Shawano: −39 °F (−39.4 °C) all-time record
- Spooner: −45 °F (−42.8 °C) second-lowest ever
- Stevens Point: −48 °F (−44.4 °C) all-time record
- Waukesha: −26 °F (−32.2 °C)
- Wausau: −40 °F (−40.0 °C) tied with January 30, 1951, for all-time record
- Temperatures not available: Appleton, Kenosha, West Allis

=== West ===
For the 1895–2017 period of record in the West climate region:

- February 1899 was the 48th-coldest February. The average temperature was 40.4 °F (4.7 °C), which was 0.5 °F (0.28 °C) colder than the 1895–2017 average of 40.9 °F (4.9 °C) and 9.3 °F (5.2 °C) warmer than the coldest February of 1903.
- December 1898 through February 1899 was the 38th-coldest meteorological winter. The average temperature was 38.4 °F (3.6 °C), which was 0.5 °F (0.28 °C) colder than the 1895–2017 average of 38.9 °F (3.8 °C) and 7.9 °F (4.4 °C) warmer than the coldest winter of 1948–49.

==== California ====
47th-coldest February, 1895–2017.

- Berkeley: 30 °F (−1.1 °C)
- Fresno: 24 °F (−4.4 °C) tied for all-time record for February
- Los Angeles: 33 °F (0.6 °C)
- Oakland: 31 °F (−0.6 °C)
- Pomona: 22 °F (−5.6 °C) all-time record for February
- Sacramento: 24 °F (−4.4 °C)
- San Diego: 34 °F (1.1 °C) tied for all-time record for February
- San Francisco: 34 °F (1.1 °C)
- Santa Barbara: 29 °F (−1.7 °C)
- Yreka: −2 °F (−18.9 °C)
- Temperatures not available: Anaheim, Bakersfield, Long Beach, San Jose

==== Nevada ====
52nd-coldest February, 1895–2017.

- Carson City: −4 °F (−20.0 °C)
- Elko: −26 °F (−32.2 °C)
- Las Vegas: 11 °F (−11.7 °C)
- Reno: 0 °F (−17.8 °C)
- Temperatures not available: Boulder City, Fernley, Henderson, Mesquite, North Las Vegas, Sparks

== Winter weather ==
On February 12, snow flurries were reported in the air from some areas from New Orleans eastward to Tampa. The storm crossed the Florida peninsula and intensified as it moved rapidly up the east coast. High Point, North Carolina recorded 10–12 inches or 0.25–0.30 metres of snow. Washington, D.C. recorded a single-day snowfall of 20.5 inches or 0.52 metres, which was a record for the time. (Note: On January 28, 1772, 36 inches or 0.91 metres of snow fell in the Washington area during the "Washington and Jefferson Snowstorm"; however that was before official record-keeping began.)

On February 19, ice floes were reported to be moving out of the Mississippi River into the Gulf of Mexico. On February 14, New Orleans dropped to 6 °F (−14.4 °C), an all-time record. The previous day, the city experienced its coldest-ever Mardi Gras low temperature of 7 °F (−13.9 °C). The Rex parade was delayed while snow was removed from the route.

The low temperature in Miami, Florida on February 14 dropped to 29 °F (−1.7 °C) with a high of only 48 °F (8.9 °C). The city has only recorded a lower temperature twice since record-keeping commenced on September 6, 1895.

== Casualties, damages, and inconveniences ==
The Great Arctic Outbreak of 1899 had disastrous impact across many areas of the continental U.S. and Cuba as people, livestock, and wildlife succumbed to the frigid cold. Bird populations were decimated across the nation. Henderson County, Tennessee saw nearly the complete extinction of its bluebird population, while Culpeper County alongside most northern and central Virginia counties lost nearly all of its quail, having to import new birds in the late teens and 1920s to repopulate the areas. Pine Warblers were also especially decimated.

Some of the bird species affected:

- Bluebird
- Blue-headed vireo
- Catbirds
- Chipping sparrow
- Dark-eyed junco (also known as snowbird)
- Fox sparrow
- Grass finch
- Hermit thrush
- Killdeer
- Meadowlark
- Mourning dove
- Pine warbler
- Quail
- Savannah sparrow
- Song sparrow
- Swamp sparrow
- Woodcock

It has been estimated that over 100 people died. In Brooklyn, 31 year-old Mary Goodwin was frozen to death and a thinly clad, unidentified woman in The Dalles, Oregon was found frozen to death in a hallway in an attempt to find warmth. Mail carriers Palmer and Hawkins of New York were thought to have drowned attempting to deliver the mail. It is believed that their boat, overturned by the high winds, was crushed by the floating ice.

In Georgia, crops were ruined and orchards utterly destroyed. The majority of wheat at Walla Walla, Washington was frozen out, with Eureka Flat seeing the most damage.

Traffic was brought to a complete standstill in all parts of the country. Barges on the Mississippi river, which was in some parts entirely frozen through, and the Great Lakes were brought to a complete standstill by ice. Traffic across all railroads were delayed or paralyzed indefinitely and steamers and liners were likewise delayed.
