= Otowi Historic District =

Historic district in New Mexico, United States

- U.S. National Register of Historic Places
- U.S. Historic district
- NM State Register of Cultural Properties
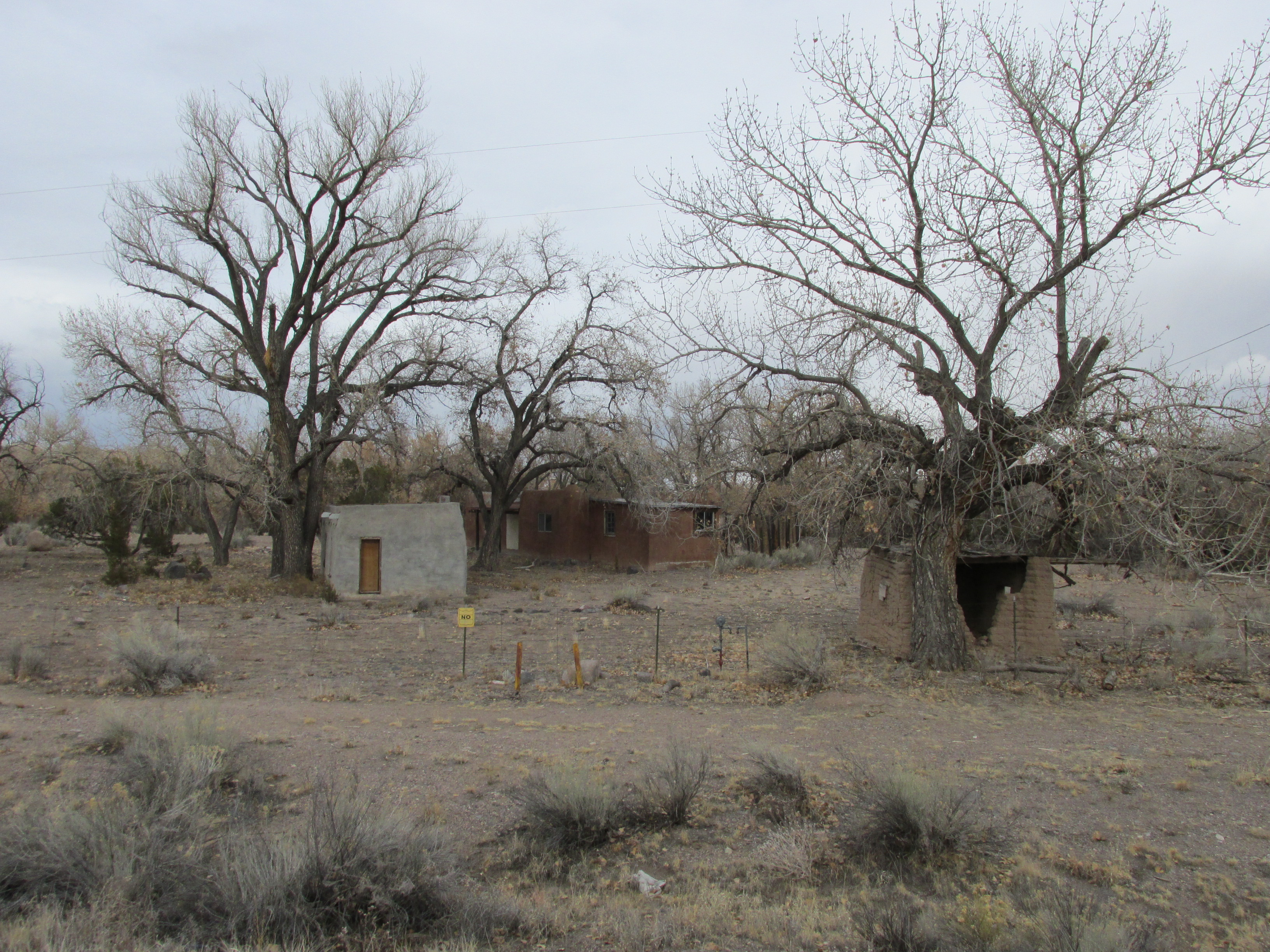
- Buildings at Otowi Crossing

- Location within New Mexico Location within the United States
- Nearest city: Santa Fe, New Mexico
- Coordinates: 35°52′31″N 106°8′31″W
- Area: 29 acres (12 ha)
- Built: 1886
- Built by: Union Bridge Company
- NRHP reference No.: 75001170
- NMSRCP No.: 295

Significant dates
- Added to NRHP: December 4, 1975
- Designated NMSRCP: August 20, 1973

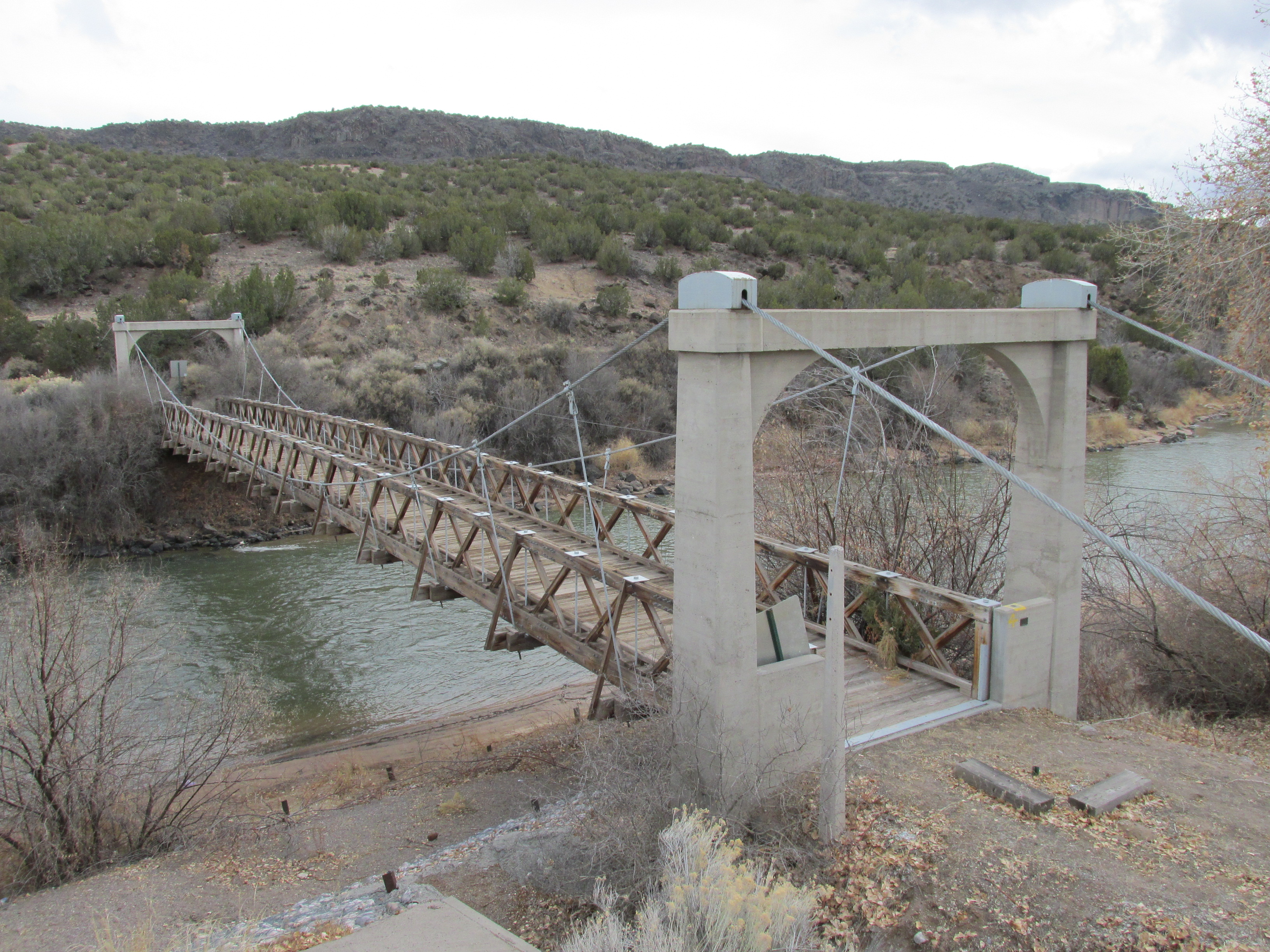
Otowi suspension bridge

The Otowi Historic District is a 29-acre (0.12 km^{2}) historic district in northern Santa Fe County, New Mexico, having four contributing buildings and three contributing structures including Otowi Suspension Bridge and was listed on the National Register of Historic Places in 1975.

Otowi (Tewa: P’otsuwiˀi, "gap where water sinks") is a place on the west bank of the Rio Grande at the head of White Rock Canyon. Established in 1886 with the name White Rock Cañon, it was little more than a stop (with a salvaged boxcar for a station building) and a river crossing on the D&RGW's Santa Fe Branch, the narrow-gauge railroad popularly known as the Chili Line.

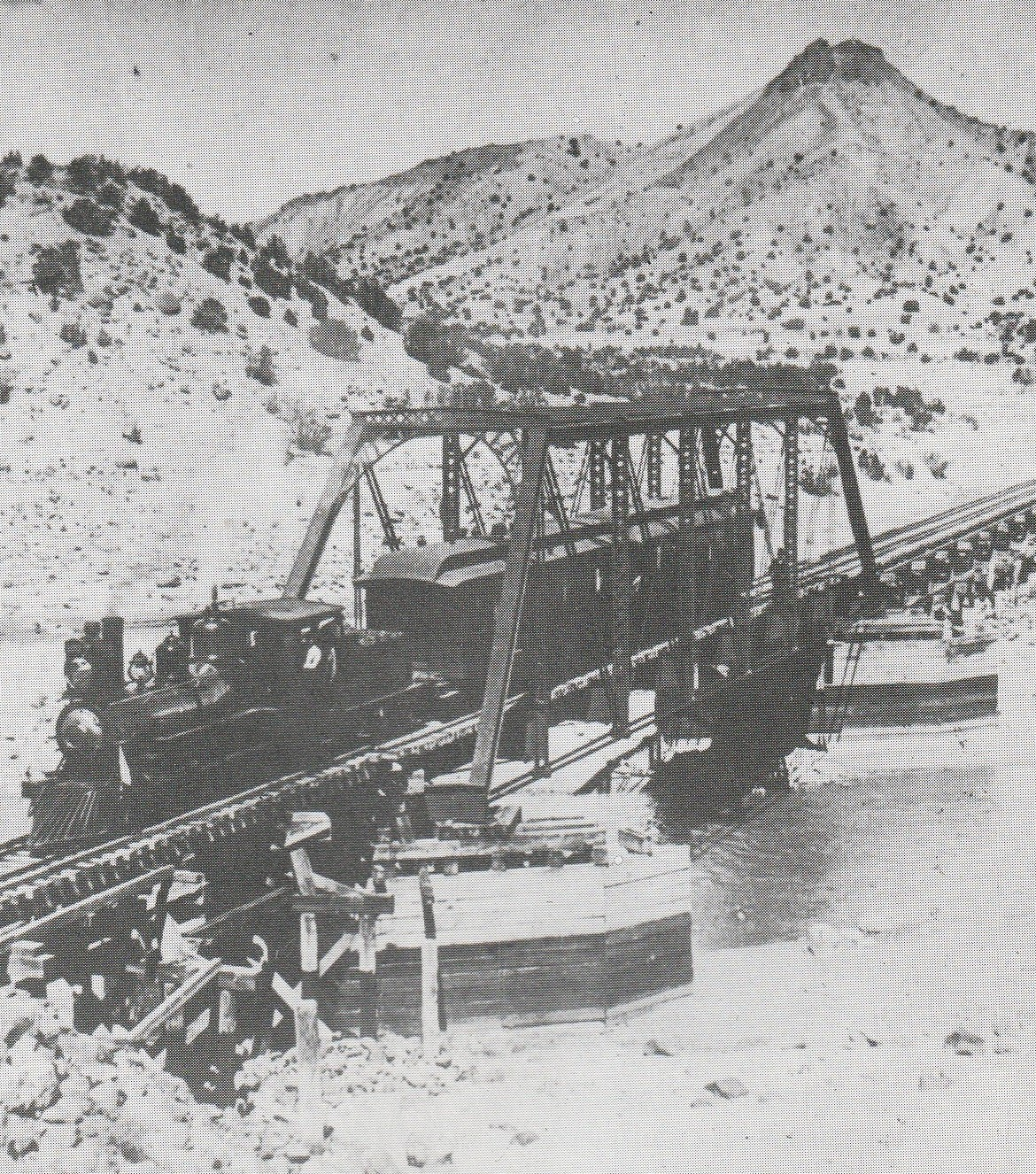
Railroad bridge at Otowi in 1890 by W H Jackson (the road bridges would later be built to the right of this image)

In 1923, nearby Los Alamos Ranch School requested a post office here using the ranch name. But a place near Las Vegas already had that name, so three other names were submitted, and the US Post Office Department chose Otowi. A single-lane, suspension road bridge was built in 1924. The railroad was removed and the post office closed in 1941. When Los Alamos Ranch School was taken over by the US Government in 1943 to become the secret Los Alamos nuclear physics laboratory, most passenger traffic serving the town and laboratory travelled on New Mexico State Road 4 (now renumbered NM 502), crossing the river at Otowi (heavy freight traffic was routed further north, crossing the river at Española, due to limited loading on the suspension bridge).

This place is the setting for Peggy Pond Church's historical memoir, The House at Otowi Bridge, (1959) which chronicles the life of Edith Warner from 1921 to 1951. She was postmistress and shopkeeper in the early years, and later the hostess of tearooms which became popular with scientists from the Manhattan Project.

== See also ==
- National Register of Historic Places listings in Santa Fe County, New Mexico
