= Buckman, New Mexico =

Ghost town in New Mexico, United States

- Ghost town
- Location within the state of New Mexico Buckman, New Mexico (the United States)
- Coordinates: 35°50′06″N 106°09′46″W
- Country: United States
- State: New Mexico
- County: Santa Fe

Population (2000)
  - Total: 0
- Time zone: UTC-5 (Mountain (MST))
  - Summer (DST): MDT
- Area code: 505

Buckman is a ghost town in Santa Fe County, New Mexico, United States of America, about 5 miles (8.0 km) south of San Ildefonso Pueblo, within the Caja del Rio on the east bank of the Rio Grande in White Rock Canyon.

== History ==
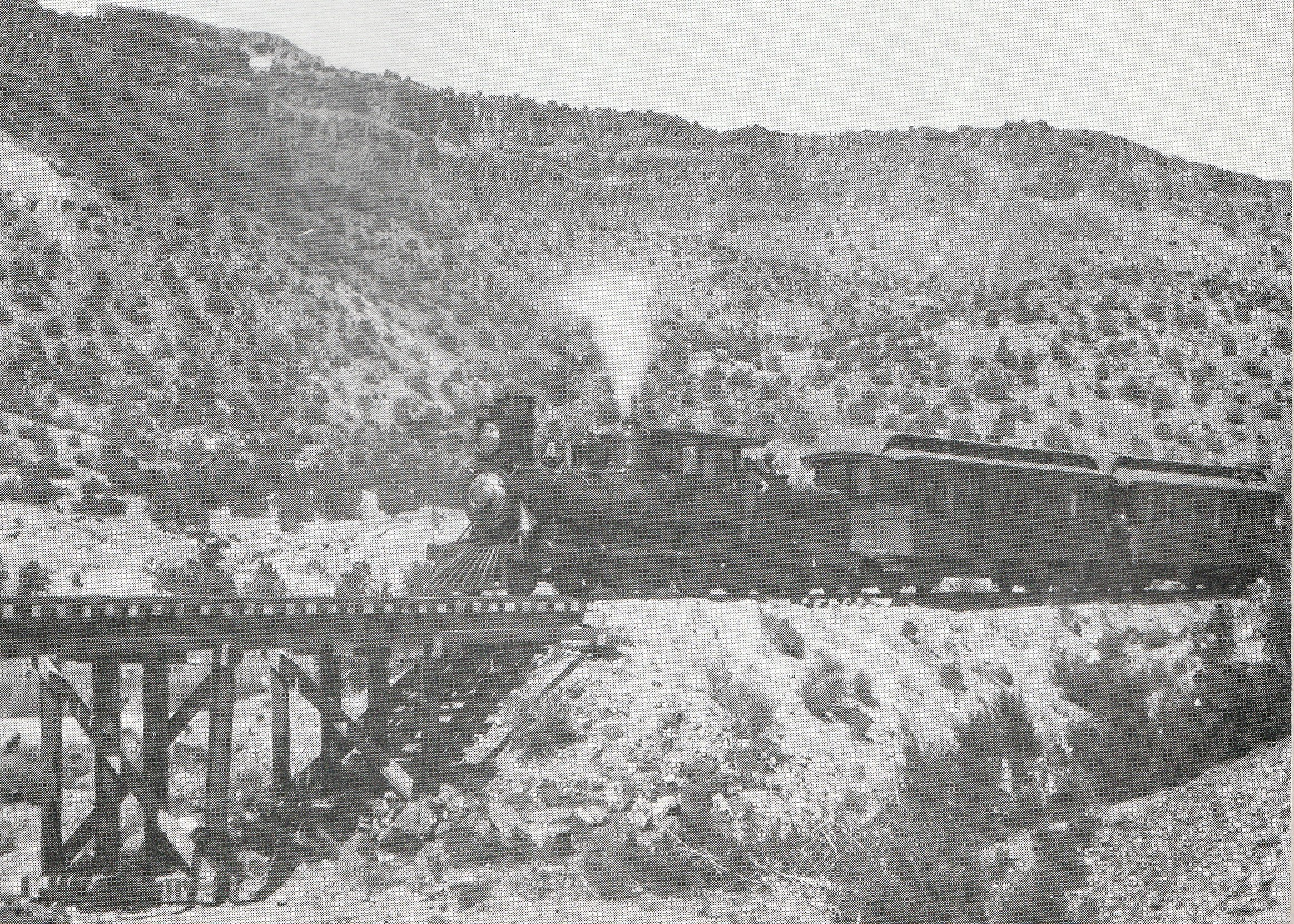
In White Rock Canyon just north of Buckman, 1890 by W H Jackson

About 1899, Henry F. (or Henry S, depending on source) Buckman, a lumberman from Oregon, constructed a plank bridge across the Rio Grande at the point where the narrow-gauge D&RG railroad's Santa Fe Branch, popularly known as the Chili Line, diverged south-eastward toward Santa Fe from its route along the river bank. Buckman had contracted to have a road blasted up a side canyon onto the Pajarito Plateau, and he moved a sawmill in to harvest stands of Ponderosa Pine. A small community grew at the railway stop, supported by the timber harvesting, and a post office was established on July 22, 1899 with Mr. Buckman as the postmaster. By 1903 Mr. Buckman's sawmills had stripped all of the pine for which he had been licensed (and allegedly much more) and he departed, with the closure of the post office on January 5, 1903 and the collapse of the community. The post office was activated again 1913 - 1925.

The stop on the railway, the bridge, livestock pens and the road remained for several years, and continued to serve a number of homesteads on the Plateau, as well as the Los Alamos Ranch School and Bandelier National Monument. After a road bridge was constructed in 1924 at Otowi, about 3 miles north, the Buckman bridge and its road fell into disuse and were abandoned. The railroad closed in 1941 and was removed during the following year.

== Present Day ==
Virtually no trace now remains of the community or bridge.

In 2001 the site was chosen for the Buckman Direct Diversion Project, a water supply development owned by, and serving the city and county of Santa Fe. The BDDP became operational in 2011.
