= Los Alamos History Museum =

Museum in Los Alamos, New Mexico, United States

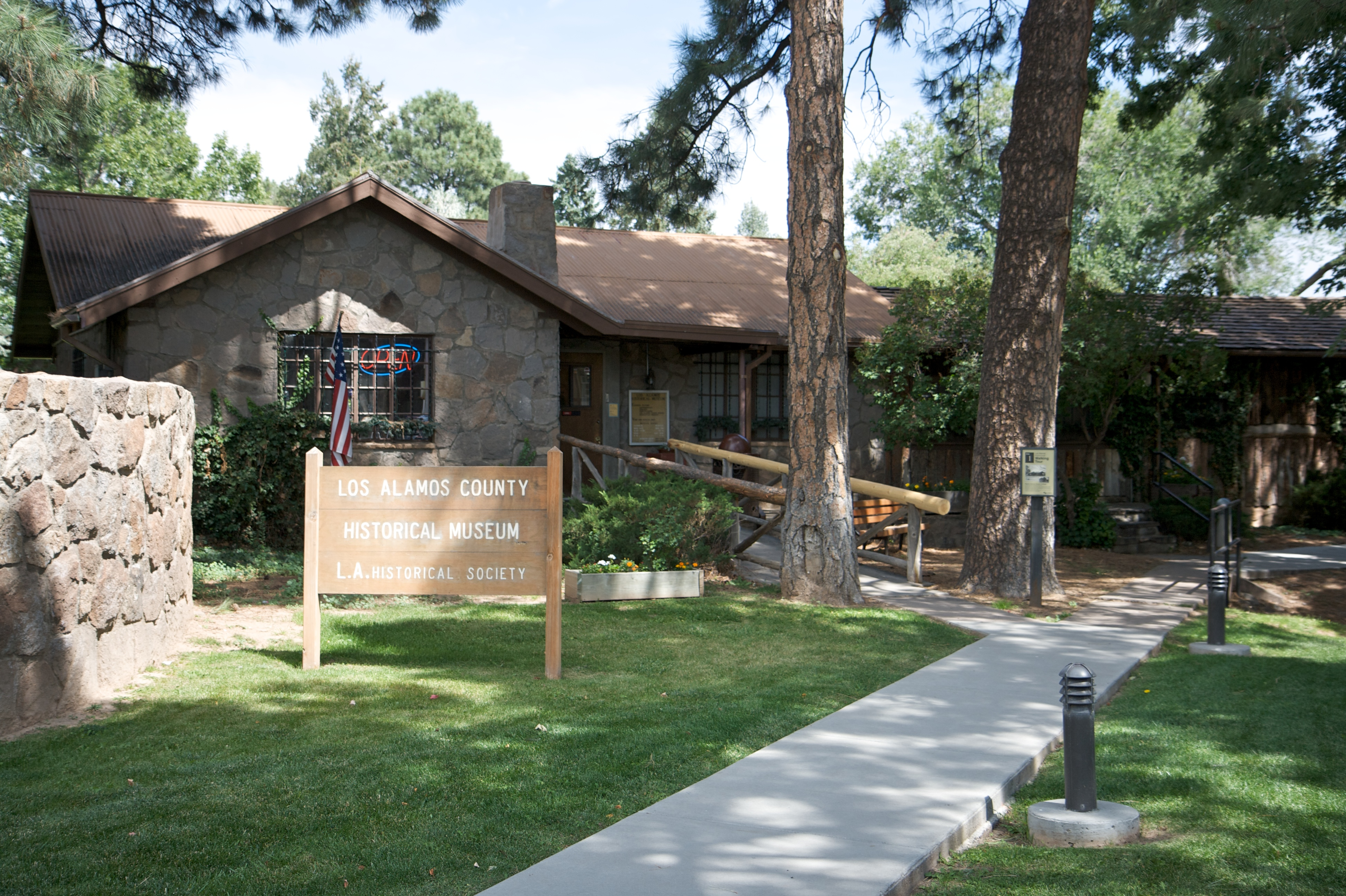
- Established: July 28, 1968
- Location: Los Alamos, New Mexico
- Coordinates: 35.8825°N 106.3020°W
- Website: losalamoshistory.org

The Los Alamos History Museum is housed in three buildings: the historic Guest Cottage, located next to Fuller Lodge, of Los Alamos Ranch School, which was General Leslie Groves's favorite place to stay during the Manhattan Project; the Bethe House a short distance away, where Hans Bethe lived for a brief time after the end of World War II.; and the Oppenheimer House, where J. Robert Oppenheimer lived during his time as Scientific Director of the Los Alamos Laboratory during the Manhattan Project.

The museum features exhibits on the early settlers of the area, the Ancestral Pueblo Indians and the early homesteaders. The museum displays the history of the Los Alamos Ranch School, an elite educational institution for wealthy boys. It was founded by Ashley Pond II using the methods of the Boy Scouts of America to build both the bodies and the minds of boys, who wore shorts as part of their school uniforms, even during the winter. The school closed in 1943 when the United States government seized the property for the Manhattan Project, the top secret project to create the atomic bomb. Photos and artifacts in the museum document this time and tell the stories of the people who lived it.

Other displays cover the Manhattan Project, the post-War years, and prizes awarded to scientists who worked at the Los Alamos laboratory.

The museum also has an area for temporary exhibits which have featured a wide variety of exhibitions about New Mexico history and World War II.

The museum properties include the Oppenheimer House, where J Robert Oppenheimer lived during the Manhattan Project. The house is awaiting a series of renovation projects before being opened to museum visitors.
