= Otowi Suspension Bridge =

- Coordinates: 35°52′30″N 106°08′28″W

Characteristics
- Design: Suspension bridge
- Material: Wood

History
- Opened: 1924
- Otowi Suspension Bridge
- U.S. National Register of Historic Places
- U.S. Historic district – Contributing property
- NM State Register of Cultural Properties
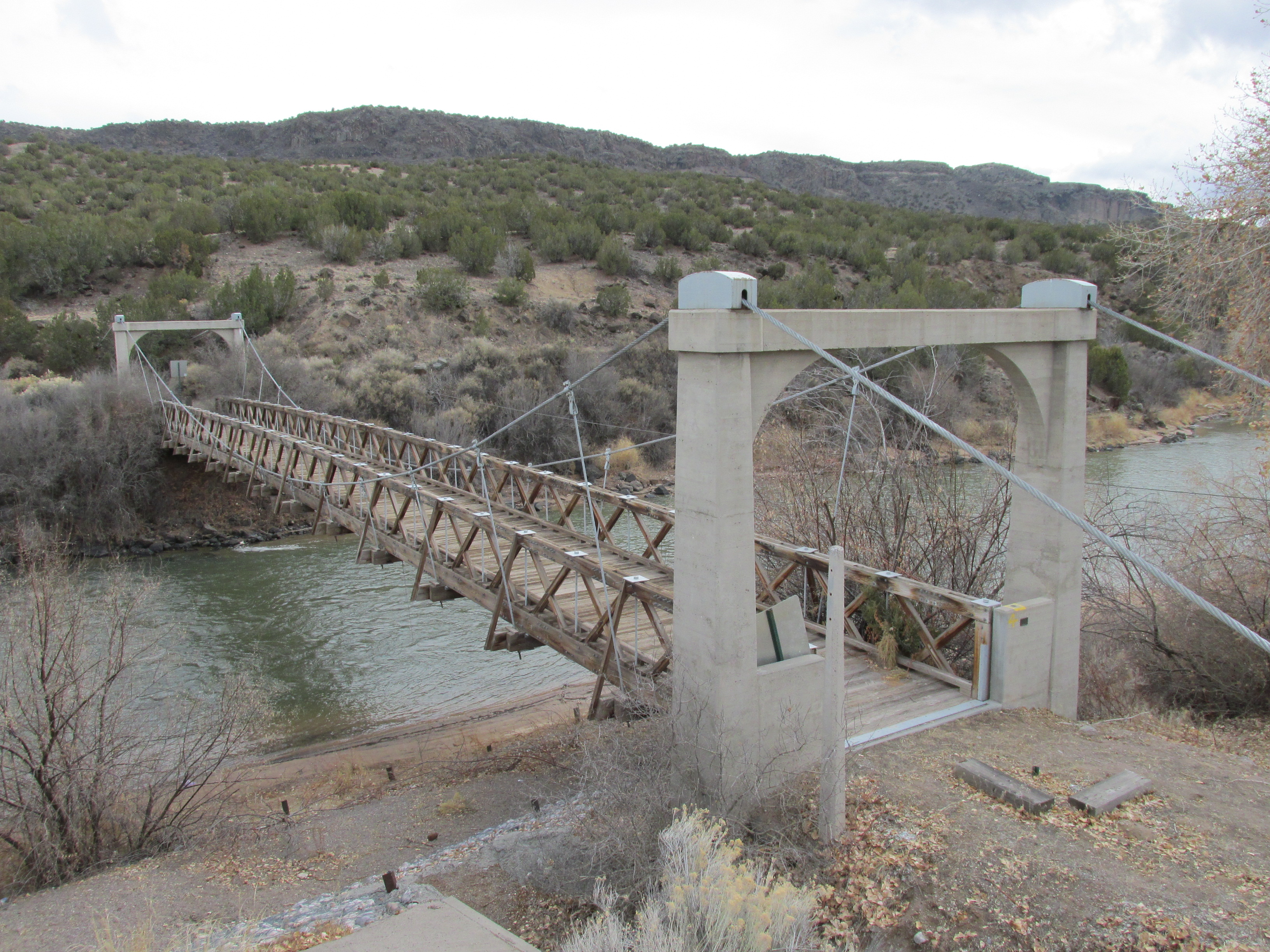
- Otowi Suspension Bridge

- Location within New Mexico Location within the United States
- Nearest city: San Ildefonso, New Mexico
- Coordinates: 35°52′29″N 106°8′29″W
- Area: less than one acre
- Built: 1924
- Architect: Lee W. Campbell
- Architectural style: Suspension bridge
- Part of: Otowi Historic District (ID75001170)
- MPS: Historic Highway Bridges of New Mexico MPS
- NRHP reference No.: 97000730
- NMSRCP No.: 1670

Significant dates
- Added to NRHP: July 15, 1997
- Designated CP: December 4, 1975
- Designated NMSRCP: May 9, 1997

Location
- Interactive map of Otowi Suspension Bridge

The Otowi Suspension Bridge, spanning the Rio Grande River near San Ildefonso, New Mexico, is a wooden single-lane suspension bridge for road traffic, built in 1924. It was listed on the National Register of Historic Places in 1997.

In its 1996 NRHP nomination, it is asserted to be significant in the areas of transportation and engineering. It was important for having opened a large part of New Mexico to automobile traffic, including Bandelier National Monument, the Pajarito Plateau, the townsite of Los Alamos and the Los Alamos National Laboratory, which became nationally important during World War II. It was also the only public highway suspension bridge in the state and was the best-rated bridge in the state in a 1987 survey.

The bridge was closed to vehicular traffic when a two-lane steel through truss bridge was opened in Spring 1948 just north of it. The steel bridge, with its 290-foot (88 m) length, was the longest road span in New Mexico at the time. In turn, it has since been replaced with a four-lane concrete deck bridge.

Now a pedestrian bridge, it was a contributing property in the listing of the Otowi Historic District to the National Register in 1975.

== See also ==
- National Register of Historic Places listings in Santa Fe County, New Mexico
