= Peggy Pond Church =

American writer (1903–1986)

- Born: Margaret Hallett Pond; December 1, 1903; Valmora, New Mexico, US
- Died: October 23, 1986 (aged 82); Santa Fe, New Mexico, US
- Occupation: Author
- Years active: 1915–1986
- Known for: Poetry and stories
- Notable work: Foretaste; Familiar Journey; The House at Otowi Bridge

Margaret Hallett Pond (December 1, 1903 – October 23, 1986), known under the pen name Peggy Pond Church, was an American author and poet. She was known as "one of the American west's major poets" and was compared to poet Witter Bynner.

Born in New Mexico, her family had to return to her grandfather's home city of Detroit after a flood destroyed her father's under-construction school when she was a baby. She grew up in the area of Three Mile Lake and the family moved back to New Mexico when she was nine years old. Her father established a new school named the Los Alamos Ranch School, which she returned to after obtaining a university degree. Her teenage years would see her begin an interest in poetry and publish several prize winning pieces even as young as twelve years old

Marrying a teacher at the school, Fermor Spencer Church, soon after returning to work at the Ranch School, she worked on and published both poetry and writing pieces throughout the 1920s and 1930s. By the end of the 1930s, Church's family settled in Los Alamos while continuing to work at the Ranch School, where she met and befriended restaurateur Edith Warner.

The creation of the Manhattan Project and closing of Los Alamos to residents, along with her personal aversion to the work being done on the project, would result in Church becoming a lifelong pacifist and supporter of the anti-violence Quaker movement. Moving several more times throughout the 1940s, the family once again settled and permanently resided in Santa Fe, New Mexico, where Church would continue to publish her work until her death in 1986.

== Childhood and education ==
She was born as Margaret Hallett Pond on December 1, 1903, to Ashley Pond Jr. and Hazel Hallett Pond in Valmora, New Mexico, though her birth place was listed as Watrous, New Mexico. The family moved back to her grandfather's home in Detroit after a massive flood in October 1904 destroyed the school her father was in the process of building. She grew up in the nature of Three Mile Lake, but the family ended up making several home moves after the death of her grandfather. They went to California and then to Roswell, New Mexico before her father in 1914 set up a private fishing club on the Pajarito Plateau. He then worked with a partner in 1916 to establish the Los Alamos Ranch School.

Church attended Santa Fe High School in addition to separate boarding schools in California and Connecticut, where she began studying and publishing poetry. After turning eighteen, she traveled to Massachusetts to attend Smith College from 1922 through 1924. She completed her degree and returned home to work at the Los Alamos Ranch School.

== Career ==
Later in her life, she moved frequently, including to Berkeley, California in 1938 to accompany her husband while he studied at Stanford University. She later returned to Los Alamos to continue work at the school, becoming friends with fellow school employee and restauranteur Edith Warner. During her time there, she also became acquainted in 1942 with J. Robert Oppenheimer just prior to the establishment of the Manhattan Project. When the military took over the area later that year and forced out all of the inhabitants and closed the school, it had a profound effect on Church's life. She was especially angry at the military research going on, opposed to the harm and destruction that the development of atomic bombs would have, particularly that said research was happening where her family had lived for so many years. This resulted in her becoming a strong pacifist and a part of the Society of Friends in 1948 with her husband.

Prior to that, her family had to move in 1942 and they resettled in Taos, New Mexico in a rental home next door to her brother. She became close friends with many of the well known writers and artists in the local Taos collective, which may have also influenced her pacifist beliefs. Then, in the latter half of the 1940's, her husband took a job in Carpinteria, California at a private school, but returned a year later due to missing his family. Instead, they established a new school in Taos, but the low number of students caused the school to close a year later, resulting in Church having to take work at the Harwood Foundation and at the local Taos bookshop. They moved again in 1952 to Berkeley, California where Fermor became a field engineer. By 1960, they moved back to New Mexico and settled in Santa Fe. After Fermor's death in 1975, Church gave a series of poetry readings and attended events at nearby universities, but eventually moved to a retirement home named El Castillo in the Santa Fe area.

=== Writing ===
Church composed her first poem at the age of twelve, titled "Ode to a Flower". Later, she officially published a poem in St. Nicholas and her later early work would win $50 awards, including her work that was published in Atlantic Monthly. Throughout the 1920s, she struggled with depression and raising her children left her with little writing time. As a joint request from painter Gustave Baumann, however, she did produce a series of poems titled "New Mexico Santos" that was meant to go alongside Baumann's woodblock prints, though neither of the two's work would be published. Her poetry would be included in Alice Corbin Henderson's 1928 anthology The Turquoise Trail. To help with her writing, a "poem cabin" was constructed in the 1930s to give Church a space to work.

The death of her father in 1933 caused Church to have a breakdown in her marriage and health, leading her to enter a rehabilitation hospital in New Haven, Connecticut nearby to her sister near the end of 1933. Despite affairs by her and her husband, they reconciled and remained married. This experience would result in Church looking into the work of Carl Jung in 1934, which would influence her writing after she began studying and recording her dreams. Michael S. Begnal in the Arizona Quarterly commented that Church's early collections of poetry, such as Foretaste and Familiar Journey, features a form of "dark ecology" that is a conflict between human existence and the environment.

In addition to her published work, Church kept a large number of personal writing and journals. She also had one named the "Journal of Death", which was written during the death of her husband. Not all of her journals survived, with several having been burned by her personally. But, of those that remained as she was nearing her death, she gave the rest in the autumn of 1986 to Shelley Armitage and they would go on to be published by Armitage in the book Bones Incandescent.

== Awards and honors ==
For her 1959 publication The House at Otowi Bridge, Church was given the Longmont award for the book's quality. The book was also named one of the 27 winners of the 1960 Southern Books Competition. Church's 1976 poetry book New & Selected Poems was chosen as a finalist for the 1976 Pushcart Prize as one of the best books published through American small presses. The New Mexico Governor's Award for Excellence and Achievements in the Arts was presented to her in 1984.

A literary biography of Church's life was released by Sharon Snyder in 2011 as a publication of the Los Alamos Historical Society that was titled At Home on the Slopes of Mountains: The Story of Peggy Pond Church.

== Personal life ==
Church first met Fermor Spencer Church in the summer of 1923 when he arrived to teach at the Los Alamos Ranch School. They were married in June 1924 and spent their honeymoon at Camp May on the nearby mountain. In her writings, she said that her relationship and marriage with Fermor was not one of love, but of companionship, that his personality was "a quiet harbor" that attracted her. They had three children together. She died on October 23, 1986, at her home by taking her own life, following the guidelines of the Hemlock Society that she was a member of.

== Bibliography ==
- Church, Peggy Pond (1933). Foretaste, Poems. Writer's Editions. p. 108. ISBN 9780865341418.
- — (1936). The Burro of Angelitos. Suttonhouse Limited. p. 34.
- —; Long, Haniel; Long, Anton V.; Sanders, Mark (1936). Interlinear to Cabeza de Vaca: His Relation of the Journey from Florida to the Pacific 1528-1536. Peccary Press. p. 47. ISBN 9780932337009.
- — (1937). Familiar Journey, Poems. Writer's Editions. p. 94. ISBN 9780865341340.
- — (1947). Ultimatum for Man. J.L. Delkin. p. 32.
- — (1954). The Ripened Fields: Fifteen Sonnets of a Marriage. Lightning Tree Press. p. 32. ISBN 9780890160435.
- — (1960). The House at Otowi Bridge: The Story of Edith Warner and Los Alamos. University of New Mexico Press. p. 149. ISBN 9780826302816.
- —; Church, Fermor S. (1974). When Los Alamos was a Ranch School. Los Alamos Historical Society. p. 60.
- — (1976). New & Selected Poems. Ahsahta Press. p. 77. ISBN 9780916272029.
- —; Macleod, Norman; Walsh, Marnie; Krieger, Robert; Wright, Carolyne; Beasley Jr., Conger; Flanner, Hildegarde; Deal, Susan Strayer; Ehrlich, Gretel; Romero, Leo; Baker, David; Speakes, Richard; Ferril, Thomas Hornsby; Crews, Judson (1983). Ahsahta Cassette Sampler. Ahsahta Press. ISBN 9780916272227.
- — (1985). Birds of Daybreak: Landscapes and Elegies. W. Gannon. p. 71. ISBN 9780883076644.
- — (1990). Armitage, Shelley (ed.). Wind's Trail: The Early Life of Mary Austin. Museum of New Mexico Press. p. 215. ISBN 9780890132005.
- — (1993). This Dancing Ground of Sky: The Selected Poetry of Peggy Pond Church. Red Crane Books. p. 184. ISBN 9781878610287.
- — (2001). Armitage, Shelley (ed.). Bones Incandescent: The Pajarito Journals of Peggy Pond Church. Texas Tech University Press. p. 236. ISBN 9780896724389.
- — (2004). Accidental Magic. Wildflower Press. p. 144. ISBN 9780971434363.
- — (2010). Shoes for the Santo Niño. Río Grande Books. p. 61. ISBN 9781890689643.
- — (2013). The Pancake Stories. University of New Mexico Press. p. 96. ISBN 9780826353870.
