= Totavi, New Mexico =

Unincorporated community in New Mexico, United States

Totavi
- Unincorporated community
- Location within New Mexico Location within the United States
- Coordinates: 35°52′28″N 106°10′47″W
- Country: United States
- State: New Mexico
- County: Santa Fe
- Elevation: 5,781 ft (1,762 m)
- Time zone: UTC-7 (Mountain (MST))
  - Summer (DST): UTC-6 (MDT)
- ZIP code: 87506
- GNIS feature ID: 918386

Totavi is an unincorporated community in Santa Fe County, New Mexico, United States along New Mexico Highway 502. It is the location of a Tewa Market & Fuel, operated by San Ildefonso Services, LLC, the only buildings in the community.

== History ==
Totavi (from Tewa: tʼotą̈vi; "quail") was founded in 1948 as a trailer park for construction workers expanding the nearby Los Alamos National Laboratory and the adjoining townsite of Los Alamos, with a post office from that date until 1953. The former gravel excavation facility at Totavi supplied gravel and was the staging location of construction of the "Road to Los Alamos" during development of the Manhattan Project during World War II and eventually, the Los Alamos National Laboratory, according to the Pueblo of San Ildefonso's enterprise website (https://tewamarkets.com/tewa-market-totavi/).

== Geography ==
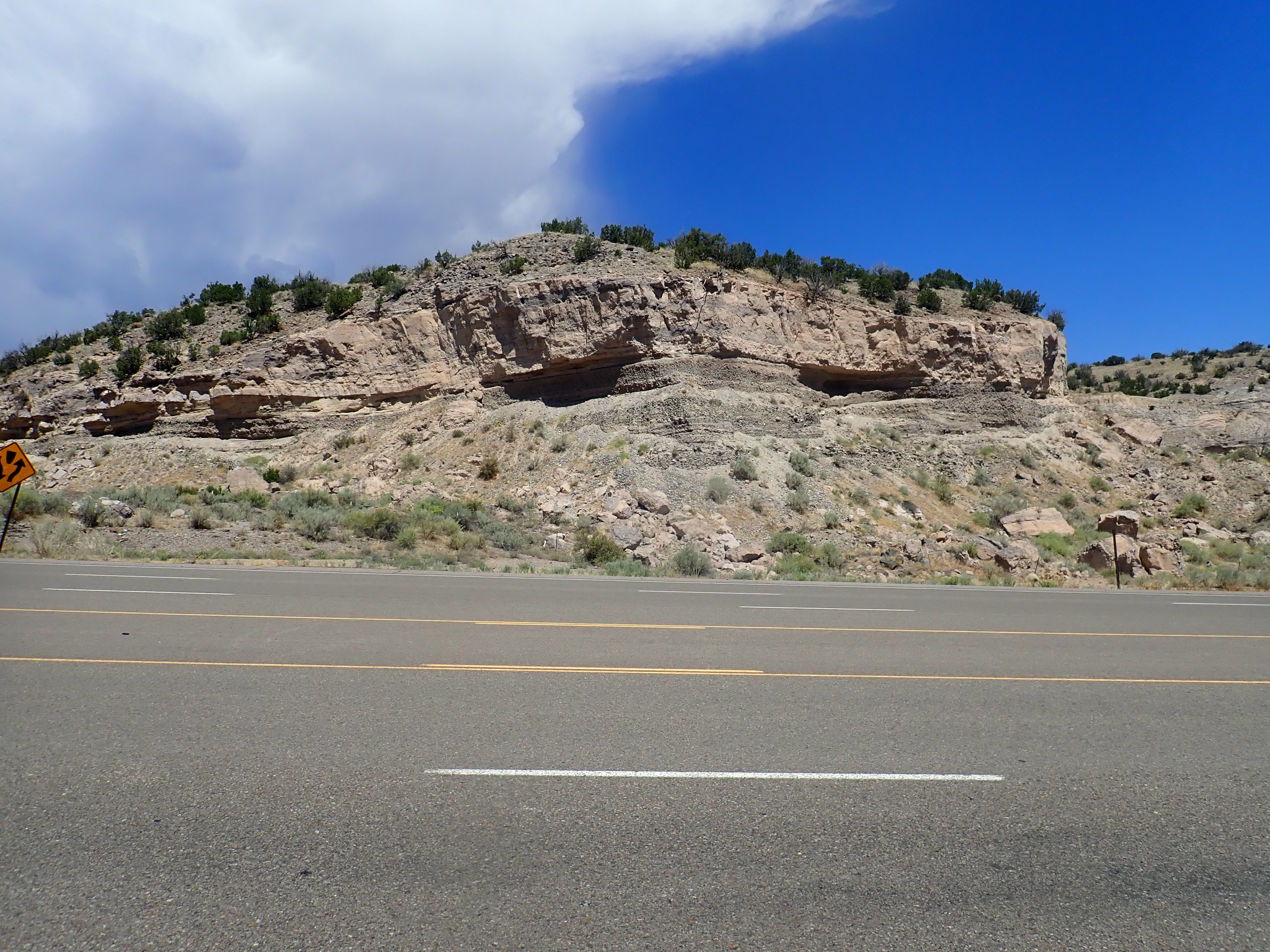
Totavi Lentil, part of the Puye Formation.

Totavi has an elevation of 5,781 feet (1,762 m) and is located in Bayo Canyon. Located nearby is the Totavi Lentil, part of the Puye Formation.
