= Los Alamos Ranch School =

Coordinates: 35°52′55″N 106°18′08″W

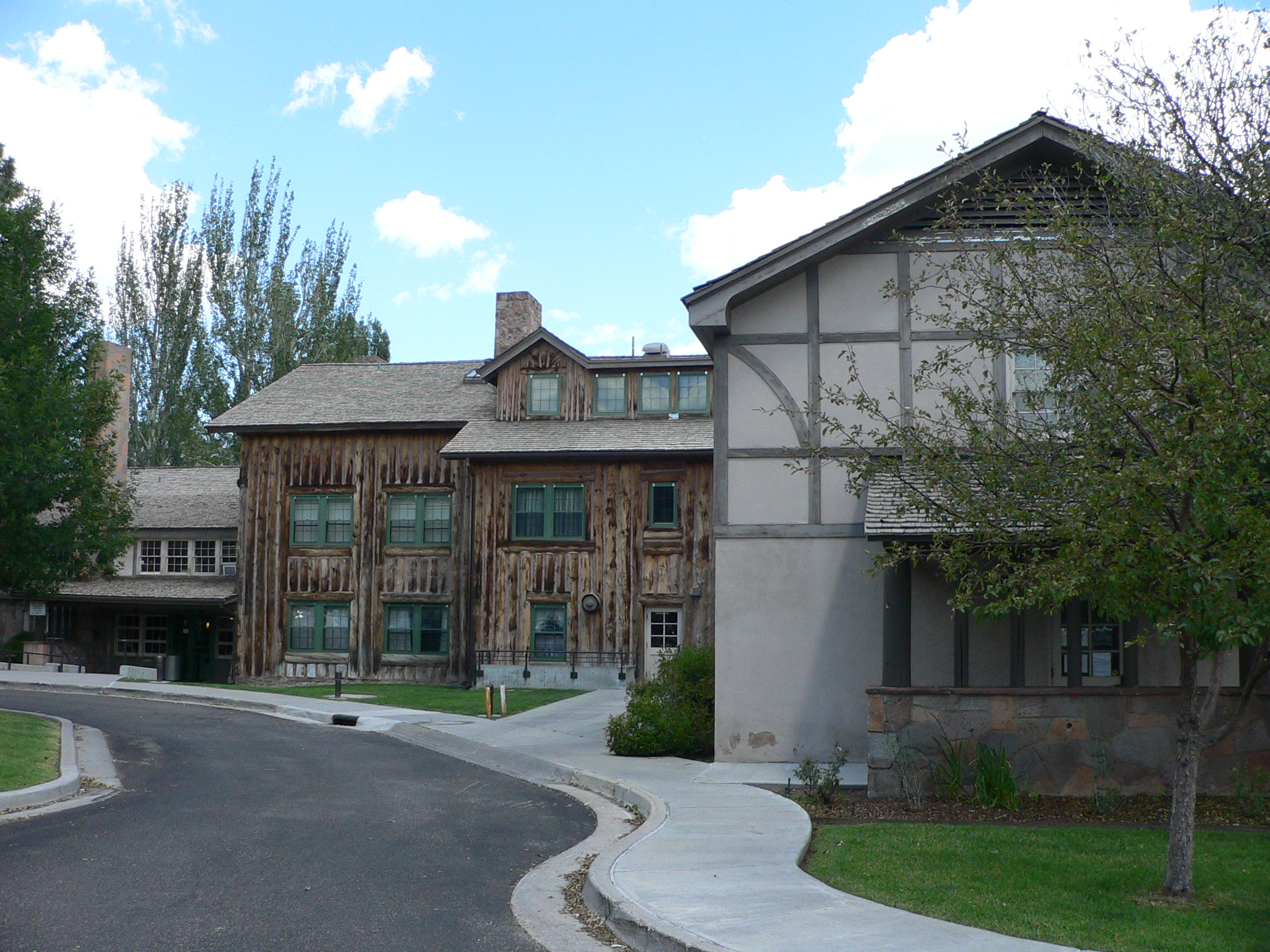

Location
- 2132 Central Avenue; Los Alamos, New Mexico; 87544; United States

Information
- Opened: 1917
- Closed: January 22, 1943
- Gender: Unisex, Male
- Age range: 12-18
- Average class size: 6
- Language: English
- Campus size: 732 acres
- Graduates: 600+/-
- Alumni: Gore Vidal; William S. Burroughs

Los Alamos Ranch School was a private ranch school for boys in the northeast corner of Sandoval County, New Mexico (since 1949, within Los Alamos County), U.S., founded in 1917 near San Ildefonso Pueblo. During World War II, the school was bought and converted into the secret nuclear research campus for Project Y, which later became the Los Alamos National Laboratory. The surrounding location has developed into the town of Los Alamos.

== School ==
The school was founded in 1917 by a Detroit businessman, Ashley Pond Jr., father of Peggy Pond Church, the New Mexican poet and author, and Dr Ashley Pond III. It offered a program modeled after the Boy Scouts of America, combining a college preparatory curriculum with a rigorous outdoor life. All students were organized into patrols of Troop 22 and wore Scout uniforms & neckerchiefs. Obtaining First Class Rank in the Boy Scouts was a requirement for graduation.

In 1939, the students' routines included calisthenics in the yard at 6:45 am, regardless of the weather; classes through 1 pm and athletic recreation in the afternoon. Students provided one half-day a week of "community service" (campus maintenance). Every Saturday was a mandatory all-day excursion on horseback into the surrounding countryside, often with overnight stays.

New Mexican architect John Gaw Meem designed the school's Fuller Lodge in 1928, constructed from some 770 ponderosa pine and aspen logs selected personally by Meem and the LARS director A.J. Connell.

Throughout its 25-year existence, the School remained small, with yearly enrollment never exceeding 46 boys (aged 12 to 18 years), but its graduates were an impressive group. Famous alumni included writer Gore Vidal; anthropologist Edward T. Hall, brothers Arthur and Robert Wood (president and general counsel of Sears Roebuck, respectively); Roy D. Chapin Jr., CEO of American Motors Corporation; and the founder of the Santa Fe Opera, John Crosby. C. Whitney Ashbridge, as a Lieutenant Colonel, returned as Post Commander of Project Y in 1943, and Stirling Colgate, later a nuclear physicist, returned to Los Alamos in 1975 and remained there for the rest of his life. Writer William S. Burroughs and Bill Veeck, owner of the Chicago White Sox, also attended but did not graduate.

== Manhattan Project ==
In November 1942, the school and the surrounding land were purchased by the United States Army's Manhattan Engineer District for use in the top-secret effort to develop the first atomic bomb. The school awarded its final diplomas in January 1943 and the Army took control of the property the following month.

The site was chosen by Brigadier General Leslie Groves for the Manhattan Project because of its isolation, access to water, ample space, pre-existing buildings which could be used for housing and the fact that much of the surrounding land was already owned by the federal government. It was also located on a mesa in which all entrances could be secured. The facility originally was referred to as "Site Y", but later became known as Los Alamos Scientific Laboratory, then Los Alamos National Laboratory. During World War II, the school's Fuller Lodge and the Big House were used as social gathering places for Los Alamos project personnel and some other buildings were used for housing. The school buildings were known as "Bathtub Row" because they were the only houses in Los Alamos with bathtubs.

The guest house is the site of the Los Alamos Historical Museum and has an extensive display on the school and its use of Scouting. The adjacent Fuller Lodge is open for visitor viewing and is frequently used for meetings or weddings. The Los Alamos Art Center is housed in the south wing by Central Avenue.

== See also ==
- The Day After Trinity, a 1981 documentary about the building of the first atomic bomb
- When Los Alamos Was a Ranch School, a 1973 book by Peggy Pond Church
- Los Alamos--the Ranch School years, 1917-1943, John D. Wirth (son of longtime Los Alamos master Cecil Wirth) and Linda Harvey Aldrich, University of New Mexico Press, 2003.
