= 2014 United States gubernatorial elections =

- November 4, 2014

39 governorships 36 states; 3 territories
	Majority party	Minority party
Party	Republican	Democratic
Seats before	29	21
Seats after	31	18
Seat change	▲2	▼3
Popular vote	32,353,526	29,722,192
Percentage	50.33%	46.24%
Seats up	22	14
Seats won	24	11
	Third party
Party	Independent
Seats before	0
Seats after	1
Seat change	▲1
Popular vote	475,101
Percentage	0.74%
Seats up	0
Seats won	1
- Map of the results Democratic gain Republican gain Democratic hold Republican hold Independent gain No election The 2013 special elections, although covered in this article, are not included in this infobox summary.

United States gubernatorial elections were held on November 4, 2014, in 36 states and three territories, concurrent with other elections during the 2014 United States elections.

The Republicans defended 22 seats, compared to the Democrats' 14. The Republicans held open seats in Arizona, Nebraska, and Texas; and gained open Democratic-held seats in Massachusetts, Maryland, and Arkansas. Republican Bruce Rauner also defeated Democratic incumbent Pat Quinn in Illinois. The only Republican losses were incumbents Tom Corbett of Pennsylvania, who lost to Democrat Tom Wolf, and Sean Parnell of Alaska, who lost to independent Bill Walker. Democrats held their open seat in Rhode Island, as well as Hawaii, where incumbent governor Neil Abercrombie was defeated in the primary.

All totaled, the Republicans had a net gain of two seats (giving them 31 total), the Democrats had a net loss of three seats (leaving them with 18 total), and an independent picked up one seat (giving them 1 total). As a result of these races, Republican Terry Branstad was re-elected to his sixth full four-year term as governor of Iowa, and thus became the longest-serving governor in U.S. history.

As of 2026, this is the last time that Republicans have won gubernatorial races in Illinois, Kansas, Maine, Michigan, New Mexico, and Wisconsin; that Democrats won races in New Hampshire and Vermont; that a candidate outside of the two major parties won the governorship of Alaska or any state; and that Michigan, Pennsylvania, and Wisconsin did not vote for gubernatorial candidates of the same party.

== Election predictions ==
Several sites and individuals published predictions of competitive seats. These predictions looked at factors such as the strength of the incumbent (if the incumbent is running for re-election), the strength of the candidates, and the partisan leanings of the state (reflected in part by the state's Cook Partisan Voting Index rating). The predictions assigned ratings to each seat, with the rating indicating the predicted advantage that a party has in winning that seat.

Most election predictors use:

- "tossup": no advantage
- "tilt" (used by some predictors): advantage that is not quite as strong as "lean"
- "lean": slight advantage
- "likely": significant, but surmountable, advantage
- "safe" or "solid": near-certain chance of victory

State	PVI	Incumbent	Last race	Cook Nov 3, 2014	IE Nov 3, 2014	Sabato Nov 3, 2014	RCP Nov 2, 2014	Result
Alabama	R+14	Robert J. Bentley	57.9% R	Solid R	Solid R	Safe R	Safe R	Bentley; 63.6% R
Alaska	R+12	Sean Parnell	59.1% R	Tossup	Tossup	Lean I (flip)	Tossup	Walker; 48.1% I (flip)
Arizona	R+7	Jan Brewer (term-limited)	54.3% R	Lean R	Lean R	Likely R	Lean R	Ducey; 53.4% R
Arkansas	R+14	Mike Beebe (term-limited)	64.4% D	Lean R (flip)	Lean R (flip)	Likely R (flip)	Lean R (flip)	Hutchinson; 55.4% R (flip)
California	D+9	Jerry Brown	53.8% D	Solid D	Solid D	Safe D	Safe D	Brown; 60.0% D
Colorado	D+1	John Hickenlooper	51.1% D	Tossup	Tilt D	Lean D	Tossup	Hickenlooper; 49.3% D
Connecticut	D+7	Dan Malloy	49.5% D	Tossup	Tossup	Lean D	Tossup	Malloy; 50.7% D
Florida	R+2	Rick Scott	48.9% R	Tossup	Tossup	Lean D (flip)	Tossup	Scott; 48.1% R
Georgia	R+6	Nathan Deal	53.0% R	Tossup	Lean R	Lean R	Tossup	Deal; 52.1% R
Hawaii	D+20	Neil Abercrombie (lost renomination)	57.8% D	Lean D	Lean D	Likely D	Likely D	Ige; 49.5% D
Idaho	R+18	Butch Otter	59.1% R	Solid R	Likely R	Likely R	Likely R	Otter; 53.5% R
Illinois	D+8	Pat Quinn	46.8% D	Tossup	Tossup	Lean D	Tossup	Rauner; 50.3% R (flip)
Iowa	D+1	Terry Branstad	52.9% R	Likely R	Solid R	Safe R	Safe R	Branstad; 59.0% R
Kansas	R+12	Sam Brownback	63.3% R	Tossup	Tossup	Lean D (flip)	Tossup	Brownback; 49.8% R
Maine	D+6	Paul LePage	37.6% R	Tossup	Tossup	Lean D (flip)	Tossup	LePage; 48.2% R
Maryland	D+10	Martin O'Malley (term-limited)	56.2% D	Tossup	Tilt D	Lean D	Tossup	Hogan; 51.0% R (flip)
Massachusetts	D+10	Deval Patrick (retiring)	48.4% D	Tossup	Tilt R (flip)	Lean R (flip)	Tossup	Baker; 48.4% R (flip)
Michigan	D+4	Rick Snyder	58.1% R	Tossup	Tilt R	Lean R	Tossup	Snyder; 50.9% R
Minnesota	D+2	Mark Dayton	43.6% D	Likely D	Solid D	Likely D	Lean D	Dayton; 50.1% D
Nebraska	R+12	Dave Heineman (term-limited)	74.3% R	Solid R	Solid R	Safe R	Likely R	Ricketts; 57.2% R
Nevada	D+2	Brian Sandoval	53.4% R	Solid R	Solid R	Safe R	Safe R	Sandoval; 70.6% R
New Hampshire	D+1	Maggie Hassan	54.6% D	Lean D	Likely D	Lean D	Tossup	Hassan; 52.4% D
New Mexico	D+4	Susana Martinez	53.3% R	Likely R	Solid R	Safe R	Likely R	Martinez; 57.2% R
New York	D+11	Andrew Cuomo	54.3% D	Solid D	Solid D	Safe D	Safe D	Cuomo; 54.3% D
Ohio	R+1	John Kasich	49.0% R	Solid R	Solid R	Safe R	Safe R	Kasich; 63.6% R
Oklahoma	R+19	Mary Fallin	60.4% R	Solid R	Solid R	Safe R	Likely R	Fallin; 55.8% R
Oregon	D+5	John Kitzhaber	49.3% D	Likely D	Safe D	Likely D	Lean D	Kitzhaber; 49.9% D
Pennsylvania	D+1	Tom Corbett	54.5% R	Likely D (flip)	Likely D (flip)	Safe D (flip)	Likely D (flip)	Wolf; 54.9% D (flip)
Rhode Island	D+11	Lincoln Chafee (retiring)	36.1% I (Note: Chafee was elected as an independent, but became a Democrat on May 30, 2013.)	Tossup	Tilt D	Lean D	Tossup	Raimondo; 40.7% D
South Carolina	R+8	Nikki Haley	51.4% R	Likely R	Likely R	Likely R	Likely R	Haley; 55.9% R
South Dakota	R+10	Dennis Daugaard	61.5% R	Solid R	Solid R	Safe R	Safe R	Daugaard; 70.5% R
Tennessee	R+12	Bill Haslam	65.0% R	Solid R	Solid R	Safe R	Safe R	Haslam; 70.3% R
Texas	R+10	Rick Perry (retiring)	55.0% R	Likely R	Solid R	Safe R	Likely R	Abbott; 59.3% R
Vermont	D+16	Peter Shumlin	57.8% D	Solid D	Solid D	Safe D	Likely D	Shumlin; 46.4% D
Wisconsin	D+2	Scott Walker	53.1% R	Tossup	Tilt R	Lean R	Tossup	Walker; 52.3% R
Wyoming	R+22	Matt Mead	65.7% R	Solid R	Solid R	Safe R	Safe R	Mead; 59.4% R

== Race summary ==
=== States ===
Data from The New York Times

State	Incumbent	Party	First elected	Result	Candidates
Alabama	Robert J. Bentley	Republican	2010	Incumbent re-elected.	▌ ✓ Robert J. Bentley (Republican) 63.6%; ▌Parker Griffith (Democratic) 36.2%
Alaska	Sean Parnell	Republican	2009 (Note: Parnell took office after his predecessor (Sarah Palin) resigned. He was subsequently elected in the 2010 Alaska gubernatorial election.)	Incumbent lost re-election. New governor elected. Independent gain.	▌ ✓ Bill Walker (Independent) 48.1%; ▌Sean Parnell (Republican) 45.9%; ▌Carolyn Clift (Libertarian) 3.2%; ▌J. R. Myers (Constitution) 2.5%
Arizona	Jan Brewer	Republican	2009 (Note: Brewer took office after her predecessor (Janet Napolitano) resigned. She was subsequently elected in the 2010 Arizona gubernatorial election.)	Incumbent term-limited. New governor elected. Republican hold.	▌ ✓ Doug Ducey (Republican) 53.4%; ▌Fred DuVal (Democratic) 41.6%; ▌Barry Hess (Libertarian) 3.8%; ▌John Lewis Mealer (Americans Elect) 1.0%
Arkansas	Mike Beebe	Democratic	2006	Incumbent term-limited. New governor elected. Republican gain.	▌ ✓ Asa Hutchinson (Republican) 55.4%; ▌Mike Ross (Democratic) 41.5%; ▌Frank Gilbert (Libertarian) 1.9%; ▌Josh Drake (Green) 1.2%
California	Jerry Brown	Democratic	1974; 1982 (retired); 2010	Incumbent re-elected.	▌ ✓ Jerry Brown (Democratic) 60.0%; ▌Neel Kashkari (Republican) 40.0%
Colorado	John Hickenlooper	Democratic	2010	Incumbent re-elected.	▌ ✓ John Hickenlooper (Democratic) 49.3%; ▌Bob Beauprez (Republican) 46.0%; ▌Matthew Hess (Libertarian) 1.9%; ▌Harry Hempy (Green) 1.3%; ▌Mike Dunafon (Independent) 1.2%
Connecticut	Dannel Malloy	Democratic	2010	Incumbent re-elected.	▌ ✓ Dannel Malloy (Democratic) 50.7%; ▌Thomas C. Foley (Republican) 48.2%; ▌Joe Visconti (Independent) 1.1%
Florida	Rick Scott	Republican	2010	Incumbent re-elected.	▌ ✓ Rick Scott (Republican) 48.1%; ▌Charlie Crist (Democratic) 47.1%; ▌Adrian Wyllie (Libertarian) 3.8%
Georgia	Nathan Deal	Republican	2010	Incumbent re-elected.	▌ ✓ Nathan Deal (Republican) 52.7%; ▌Jason Carter (Democratic) 44.9%; ▌Andrew Hunt (Libertarian) 2.4%
Hawaii	Neil Abercrombie	Democratic	2010	Incumbent lost renomination. New governor elected. Democratic hold.	▌ ✓ David Ige (Democratic) 49.5%; ▌Duke Aiona (Republican) 37.1%; ▌Mufi Hannemann (Independent) 11.7%; ▌Jeff Davis (Libertarian) 1.8%
Idaho	Butch Otter	Republican	2006	Incumbent re-elected.	▌ ✓ Butch Otter (Republican) 53.5%; ▌A. J. Balukoff (Democratic) 38.6%; ▌John Bujak (Libertarian) 4.1%; ▌Jill Humble (Independent) 2.0%; ▌Steven Pankey (Constitution) 1.2%
Illinois	Pat Quinn	Democratic	2009 (Note: Quinn took office after his predecessor (Rod Blagojevich) was removed from office. He was subsequently elected in the 2010 Illinois gubernatorial election.)	Incumbent lost re-election. New governor elected. Republican gain.	▌ ✓ Bruce Rauner (Republican) 50.3%; ▌Pat Quinn (Democratic) 46.4%; ▌Chad Grimm (Libertarian) 3.4%
Iowa	Terry Branstad	Republican	1982; 1998 (retired); 2010	Incumbent re-elected.	▌ ✓ Terry Branstad (Republican) 59.0%; ▌Jack Hatch (Democratic) 37.3%; ▌Lee Hieb (Libertarian) 1.8%
Kansas	Sam Brownback	Republican	2010	Incumbent re-elected.	▌ ✓ Sam Brownback (Republican) 49.8%; ▌Paul Davis (Democratic) 46.1%; ▌Keen Umbehr (Libertarian) 4.1%
Maine	Paul LePage	Republican	2010	Incumbent re-elected.	▌ ✓ Paul LePage (Republican) 48.2%; ▌Mike Michaud (Democratic) 43.4%; ▌Eliot Cutler (Independent) 8.4%
Maryland	Martin O'Malley	Democratic	2006	Incumbent term-limited. New governor elected. Republican gain.	▌ ✓ Larry Hogan (Republican) 51.0%; ▌Anthony Brown (Democratic) 47.3%; ▌Shawn Quinn (Libertarian) 1.5%
Massachusetts	Deval Patrick	Democratic	2006	Incumbent retired. New governor elected. Republican gain.	▌ ✓ Charlie Baker (Republican) 48.4%; ▌Martha Coakley (Democratic) 46.5%; ▌Evan Falchuk (United Independent) 3.3%
Michigan	Rick Snyder	Republican	2010	Incumbent re-elected.	▌ ✓ Rick Snyder (Republican) 50.9%; ▌Mark Schauer (Democratic) 46.9%; ▌Mary Buzuma (Libertarian) 1.1%
Minnesota	Mark Dayton	DFL	2010	Incumbent re-elected.	▌ ✓ Mark Dayton (DFL) 50.1%; ▌Jeff Johnson (Republican) 44.5%; ▌Hannah Nicollet (Independence) 2.9%; ▌Chris Wright (GLC) 1.6%
Nebraska	Dave Heineman	Republican	2005 (Note: Heineman took office after his predecessor (Mike Johanns) resigned. He was subsequently elected in the 2006 Nebraska gubernatorial election.)	Incumbent term-limited. New governor elected. Republican hold.	▌ ✓ Pete Ricketts (Republican) 57.2%; ▌Chuck Hassebrook (Democratic) 39.2%; ▌Mark Elworth Jr. (Libertarian) 3.5%
Nevada	Brian Sandoval	Republican	2010	Incumbent re-elected.	▌ ✓ Brian Sandoval (Republican) 70.6%; ▌Bob Goodman (Democratic) 23.9%; ▌David VanDerBeek (Independent American) 2.7%
New Hampshire	Maggie Hassan	Democratic	2012	Incumbent re-elected.	▌ ✓ Maggie Hassan (Democratic) 52.4%; ▌Walt Havenstein (Republican) 47.4%
New Mexico	Susana Martinez	Republican	2010	Incumbent re-elected.	▌ ✓ Susana Martinez (Republican) 57.2%; ▌Gary King (Democratic) 42.8%
New York	Andrew Cuomo	Democratic	2010	Incumbent re-elected.	▌ ✓ Andrew Cuomo (Democratic) 54.3%; ▌Rob Astorino (Republican) 40.3%; ▌Howie Hawkins (Green) 4.8%
Ohio	John Kasich	Republican	2010	Incumbent re-elected.	▌ ✓ John Kasich (Republican) 63.6%; ▌Ed FitzGerald (Democratic) 33.0%; ▌Anita Rios (Green) 3.3%
Oklahoma	Mary Fallin	Republican	2010	Incumbent re-elected.	▌ ✓ Mary Fallin (Republican) 55.8%; ▌Joe Dorman (Democratic) 41.0%; ▌Kimberly Willis (Independent) 2.1%; ▌Richard Prawdzienski (Independent) 1.1%
Oregon	John Kitzhaber	Democratic	1994; 2002 (term-limited); 2010	Incumbent re-elected.	▌ ✓ John Kitzhaber (Democratic) 49.9%; ▌Dennis Richardson (Republican) 44.1%; ▌Jason Levin (Green) 2.0%; ▌Paul Grad (Libertarian) 1.5%; ▌Aaron Auer (Constitution) 1.1%; ▌Chris Henry (Progressive) 1.0%
Pennsylvania	Tom Corbett	Republican	2010	Incumbent lost re-election. New governor elected. Democratic gain.	▌ ✓ Tom Wolf (Democratic) 54.9%; ▌Tom Corbett (Republican) 45.1%
Rhode Island	Lincoln Chafee	Democratic	2010 (Note: Chafee was elected as an independent in 2010. He joined the Democratic Party in May 2013.)	Incumbent retired. New governor elected. Democratic hold.	▌ ✓ Gina Raimondo (Democratic) 40.7%; ▌Allan Fung (Republican) 36.2%; ▌Robert J. Healey (Moderate) 21.4%; ▌Kate Fletcher (Independent) 1.1%
South Carolina	Nikki Haley	Republican	2010	Incumbent re-elected.	▌ ✓ Nikki Haley (Republican) 55.9%; ▌Vincent Sheheen (Democratic) 41.4%; ▌Steve French (Libertarian) 1.2%
South Dakota	Dennis Daugaard	Republican	2010	Incumbent re-elected.	▌ ✓ Dennis Daugaard (Republican) 70.5%; ▌Susan Wismer (Democratic) 25.4%; ▌Michael J. Myers (Independent) 4.1%
Tennessee	Bill Haslam	Republican	2010	Incumbent re-elected.	▌ ✓ Bill Haslam (Republican) 70.3%; ▌Charles Brown (Democratic) 22.8%; ▌John Jay Hooker (Independent) 2.3%; ▌Shaun Crowell (Constitution) 2.0%; ▌Isa Infante (Green) 1.4%
Texas	Rick Perry	Republican	2000 (Note: Perry took office after his predecessor (George W. Bush) resigned. He was subsequently elected in the 2002 Texas gubernatorial election.)	Incumbent retired. New governor elected. Republican hold.	▌ ✓ Greg Abbott (Republican) 59.3%; ▌Wendy Davis (Democratic) 38.9%; ▌Kathie Glass (Libertarian) 1.4%
Vermont	Peter Shumlin	Democratic	2010	Incumbent re-elected.	▌ ✓ Peter Shumlin (Democratic) 46.4%; ▌Scott Milne (Republican) 45.1%; ▌Dan Feliciano (Libertarian) 4.4%; ▌Emily Peyton (Independent) 1.6%
Wisconsin	Scott Walker	Republican	2010	Incumbent re-elected.	▌ ✓ Scott Walker (Republican) 52.3%; ▌Mary Burke (Democratic) 46.6%
Wyoming	Matt Mead	Republican	2010	Incumbent re-elected.	▌ ✓ Matt Mead (Republican) 59.4%; ▌Pete Gosar (Democratic) 27.3%; ▌Don Wills (Independent) 5.9%; ▌Dee Cozzens (Libertarian) 2.4%

=== Territories and federal district ===
Territory	Incumbent	Party	First elected	Result	Candidates
District of Columbia	Vincent C. Gray	Democratic	2010	Incumbent lost renomination. New mayor elected. Democratic hold.	▌ ✓ Muriel Bowser (Democratic) 54.5%; ▌David Catania (Independent) 34.6%; ▌Carol Schwartz (Independent) 7.0%
Guam	Eddie Calvo	Republican	2010	Incumbent re-elected.	▌ ✓ Eddie Calvo (Republican) 63.7%; ▌Carl Gutierrez (Democratic) 36.0%
Northern Mariana Islands	Eloy Inos	Republican	2013 (Note: Inos took office after his predecessor (Benigno Fitial) resigned.)	Incumbent re-elected.	▌ ✓ Eloy Inos (Republican) 57.0%; ▌Heinz Hofschneider (Independent) 43.0%
U.S. Virgin Islands	John de Jongh	Democratic	2006	Incumbent term-limited. New governor elected. Independent gain.	▌ ✓ Kenneth Mapp (Independent) 63.9%; ▌Donna Christian-Christensen (Democratic) 35.9%

== Closest races ==
States where the margin of victory was under 5%:

1. Florida, 1.0%
2. Vermont, 1.3%
3. Massachusetts, 1.9%
4. Alaska, 2.2%
5. Connecticut, 2.5%
6. Colorado, 3.3%
7. Kansas, 3.7%
8. Maryland, 3.8%
9. Illinois, 3.9%
10. Michigan, 4.0%
11. Rhode Island, 4.5%
12. Maine, 4.8%

States where the margin of victory was under 10%:

1. New Hampshire, 5.0%
2. Minnesota, 5.6%
3. Wisconsin, 5.7%
4. Oregon, 5.8%
5. Georgia, 7.8%
6. Pennsylvania, 9.8%

Red denotes states won by Republicans. Blue denotes states won by Democrats. Grey denotes states won by Independents.

== Alabama ==
2014 Alabama gubernatorial election
- November 4, 2014
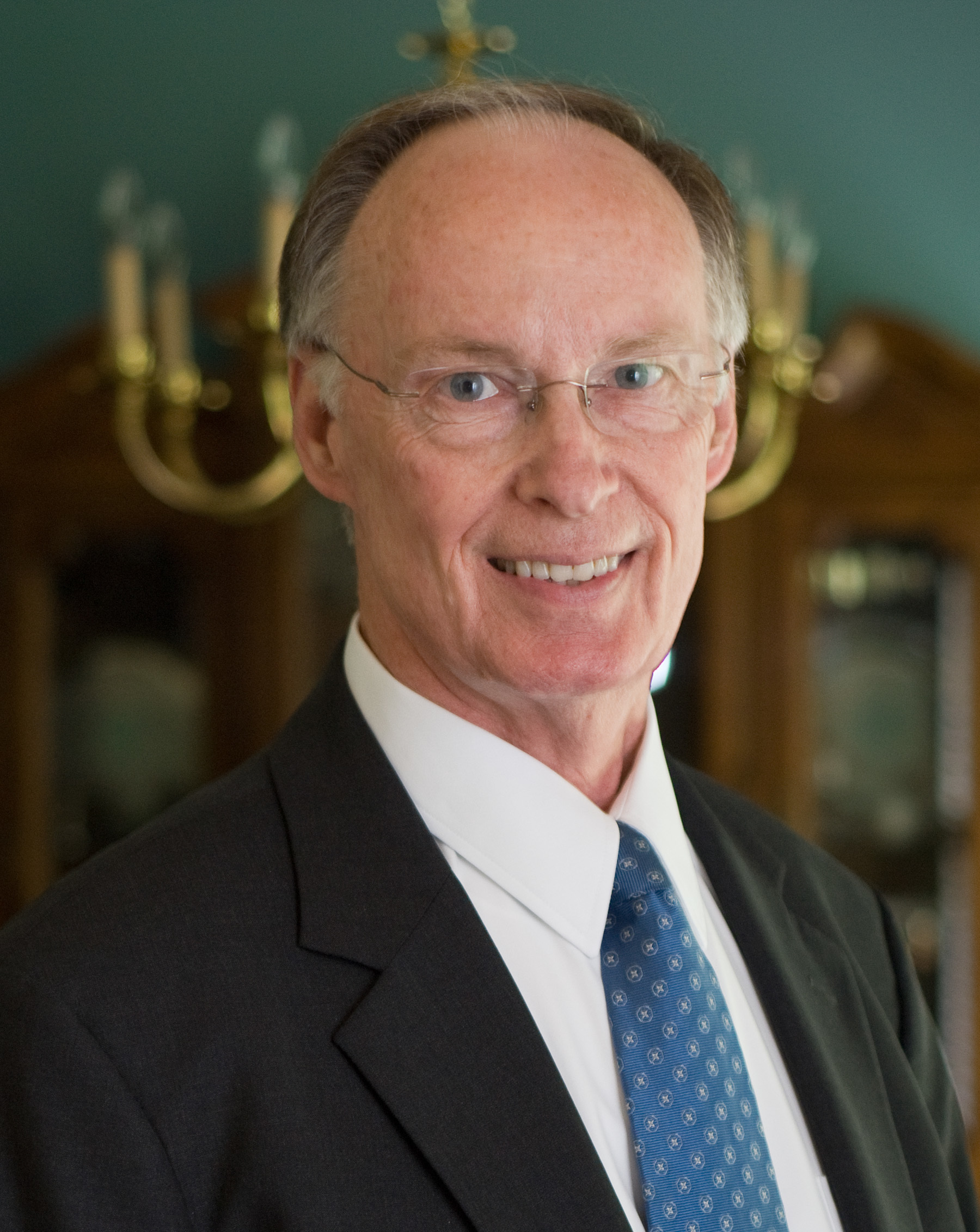

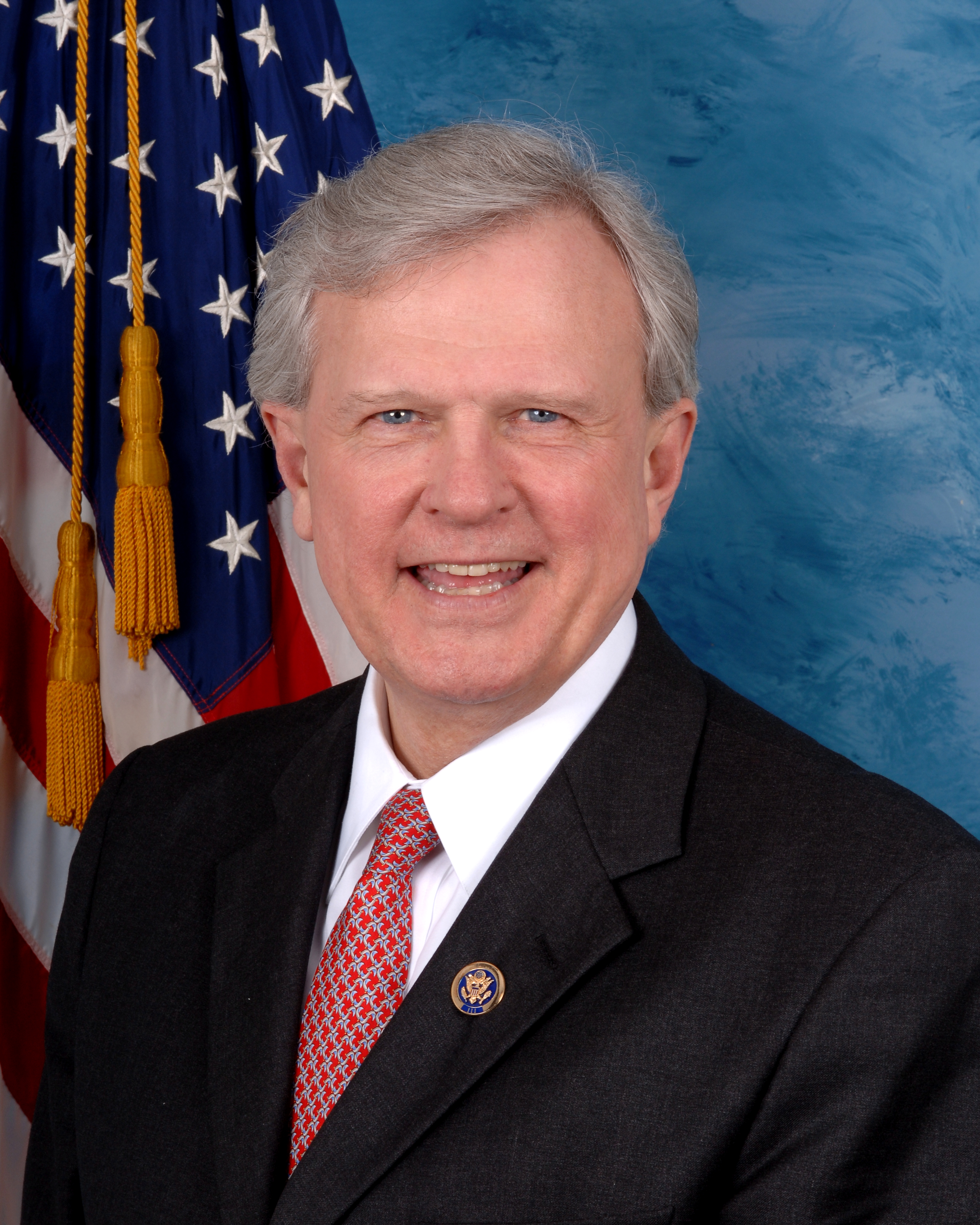
Nominee	Robert J. Bentley	Parker Griffith
Party	Republican	Democratic
Popular vote	750,231	427,787
Percentage	63.6%	36.2%
- County results
Governor before election
Robert J. Bentley
Republican
Elected Governor
Robert J. Bentley
Republican

Governor Robert J. Bentley ran for re-election. Bentley was elected with 57.9% of the vote in 2010.

Former Morgan County commissioner Stacy Lee George challenged Bentley in the Republican primary, as did Bob Starkey, a retired software company executive.

Former baseball player and businessman Kevin Bass and former U.S. representative Parker Griffith pursued the Democratic nomination, which Griffith won.

Bentley won re-election to a second term.

Alabama general election
Party	Candidate	Votes	%
Republican	Robert J. Bentley (incumbent)	750,231	63.56
Democratic	Parker Griffith	427,787	36.24
Write-in		2,395	0.20
Total votes		1,180,413	100.00
Republican hold			

== Alaska ==
2014 Alaska gubernatorial election
- November 4, 2014
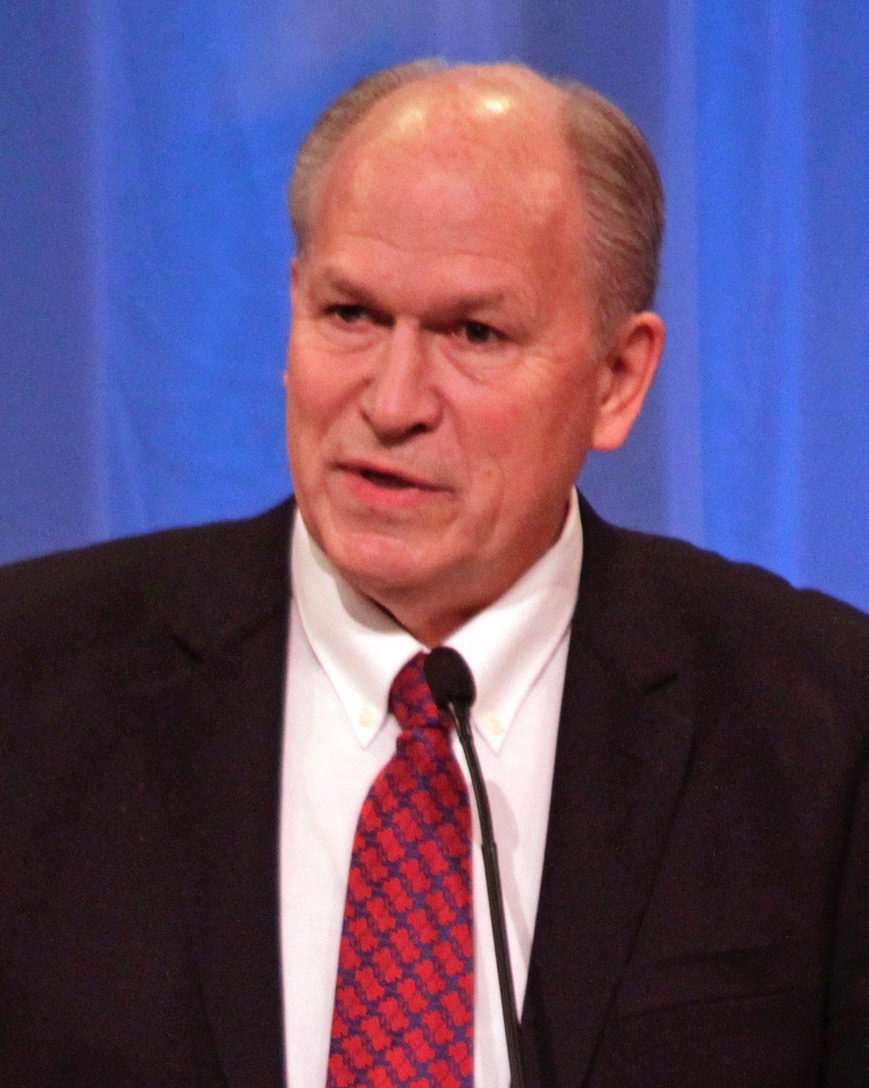

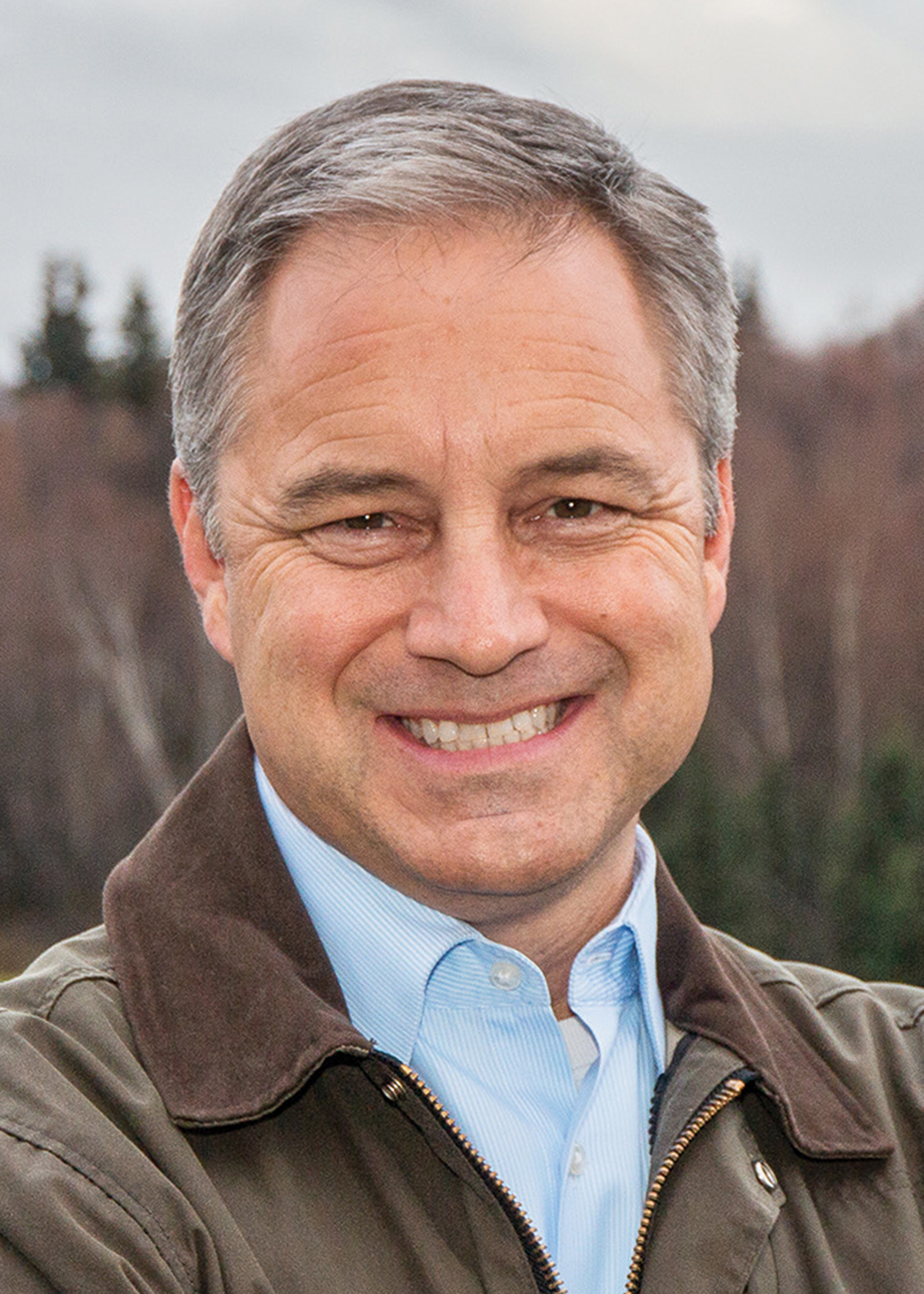
Nominee	Bill Walker	Sean Parnell
Party	Independent	Republican
Running mate	Byron Mallott	Dan Sullivan
Popular vote	134,658	128,435
Percentage	48.1%	45.9%
- State house district results
Governor before election
Sean Parnell
Republican
Elected Governor
Bill Walker
Independent

Governor Sean Parnell ran for another term. Attorney and 2010 Republican primary candidate Bill Walker at first ran in the Republican primary, but withdrew and instead ran as an independent. Governor Parnell was defeated by Independent Bill Walker.

Former Mayor of Juneau Byron Mallott won the Democratic gubernatorial primary on August 19 with 80% of the vote. On September 2, Walker and Mallott merged their campaigns, with Walker, who ran for governor and Mallott, who ran for lieutenant governor.

Alaska general election
Party	Candidate	Votes	%
Independent	Bill Walker	134,658	48.10
Republican	Sean Parnell (incumbent)	128,435	45.88
Libertarian	Carolyn Clift	8,985	3.21
Constitution	J. R. Myers	6,987	2.50
Write-in		893	0.32
Total votes		279,958	100.00
Independent gain from Republican			

== Arizona ==
2014 Arizona gubernatorial election
- November 4, 2014
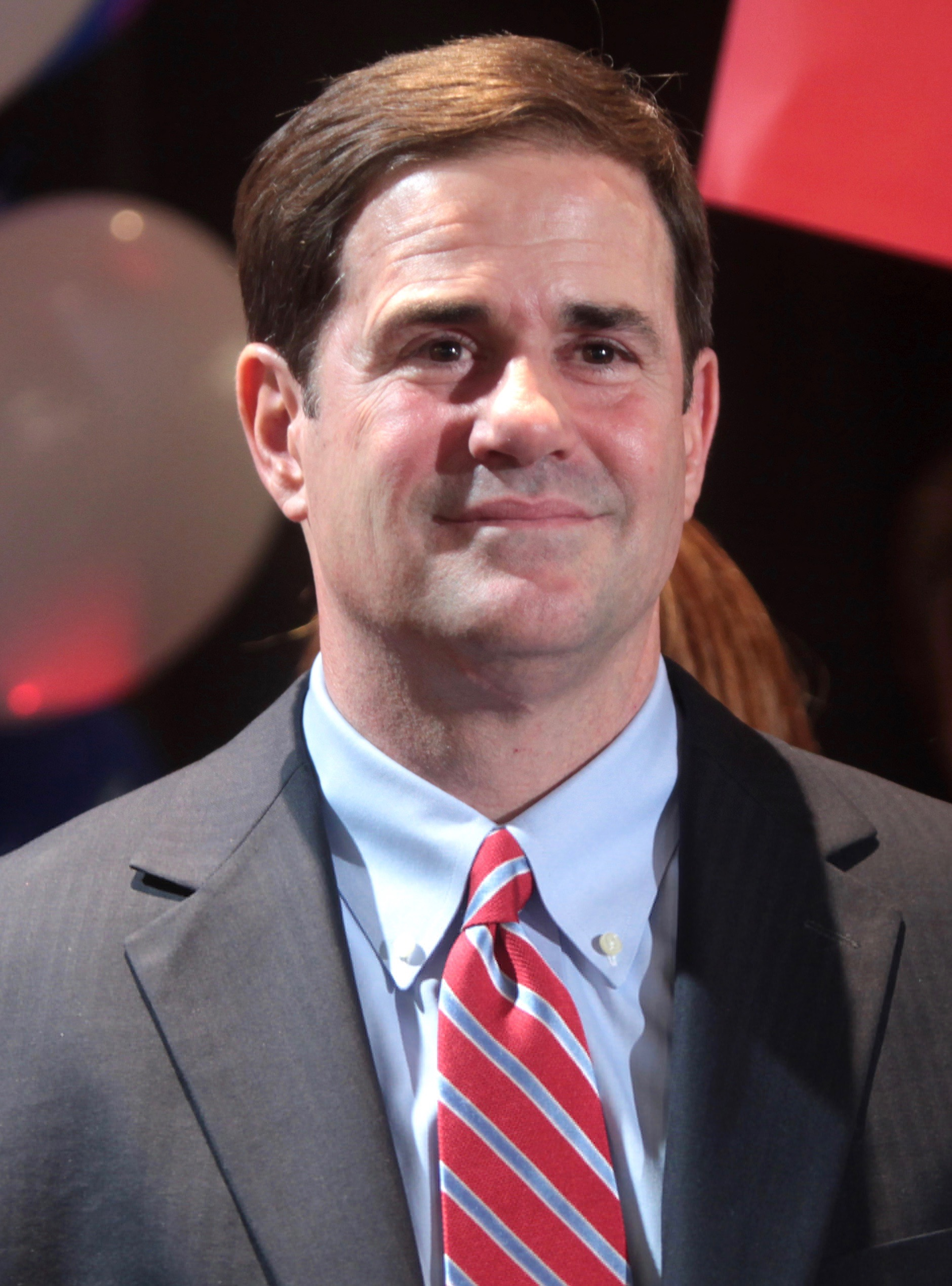

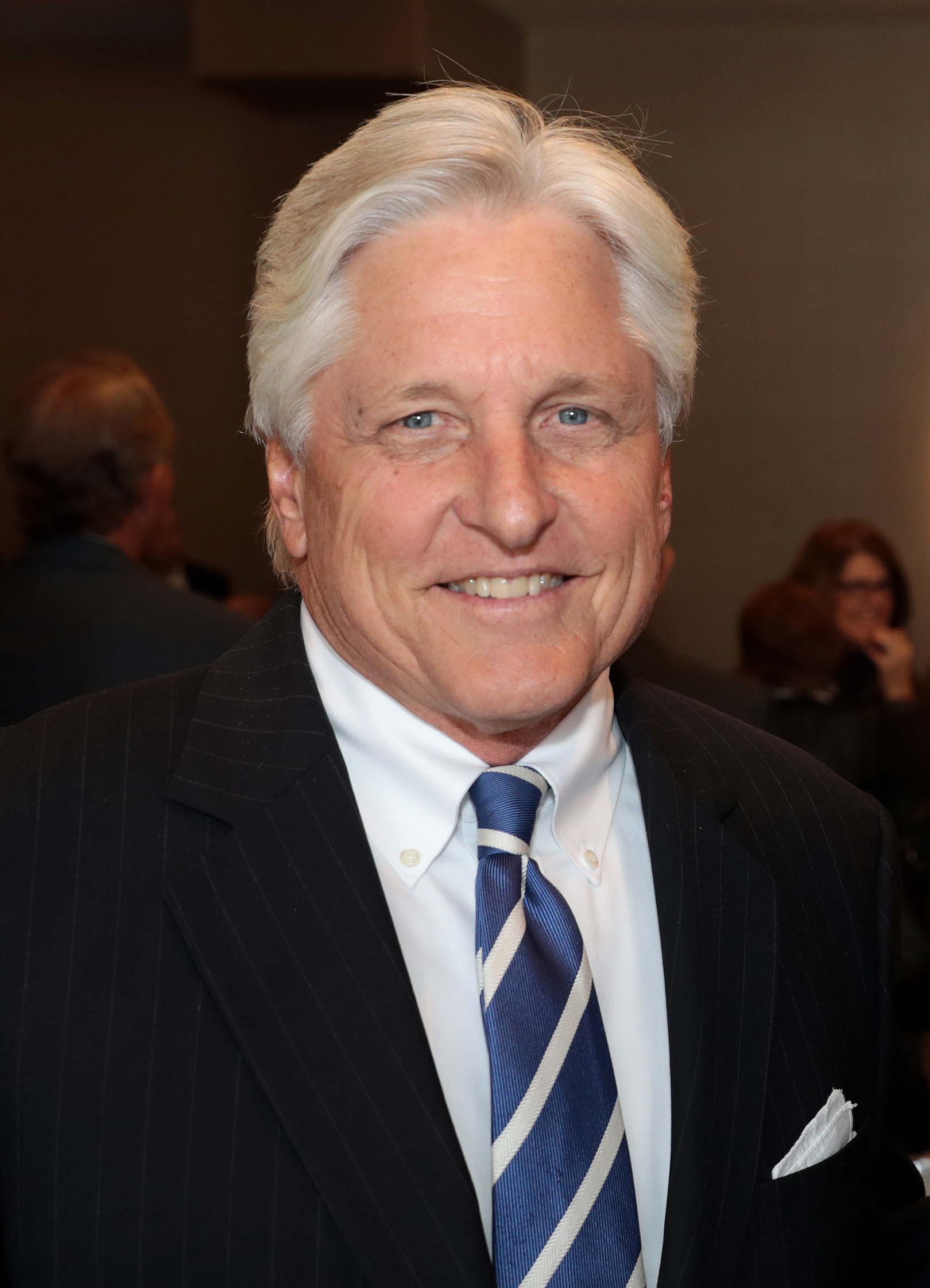
Nominee	Doug Ducey	Fred DuVal
Party	Republican	Democratic
Popular vote	805,062	626,921
Percentage	53.4%	41.6%
- County results
Governor before election
Jan Brewer
Republican
Elected Governor
Doug Ducey
Republican

Governor Jan Brewer was term-limited in 2014 despite only serving one full term, as Arizona state law limits office holders to two consecutive terms, regardless of whether they are full or partial terms. In November 2012, Brewer declared she was looking into what she called "ambiguity" in Arizona's term-limit law to seek a second full four-year term.

On March 12, 2014, Brewer announced she would not seek re-election to another four-year term, which would have required a "longshot court challenge" to the Arizona Constitution.

Arizona Secretary of State Ken Bennett, Mesa Mayor Scott Smith, State Treasurer of Arizona Doug Ducey, State Senator Al Melvin, former Go Daddy executive vice president Christine Jones, and former county attorney of Maricopa County Andrew Thomas sought the Republican nomination. Ducey won.

Fred DuVal, former chairman of the Arizona Board of Regents won the Democratic nomination.

Ducey won the election.

Arizona general election
Party	Candidate	Votes	%
Republican	Doug Ducey	805,062	53.44
Democratic	Fred DuVal	626,921	41.62
Libertarian	Barry Hess	57,337	3.81
Americans Elect	John Lewis Mealer	15,432	1.02
Write-in		1,664	0.11
Total votes		1,506,416	100.00
Republican hold			

== Arkansas ==
2014 Arkansas gubernatorial election
- November 4, 2014
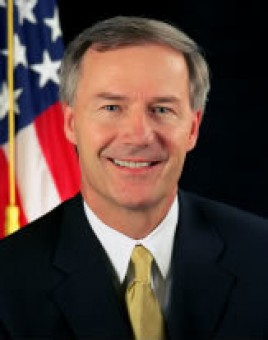

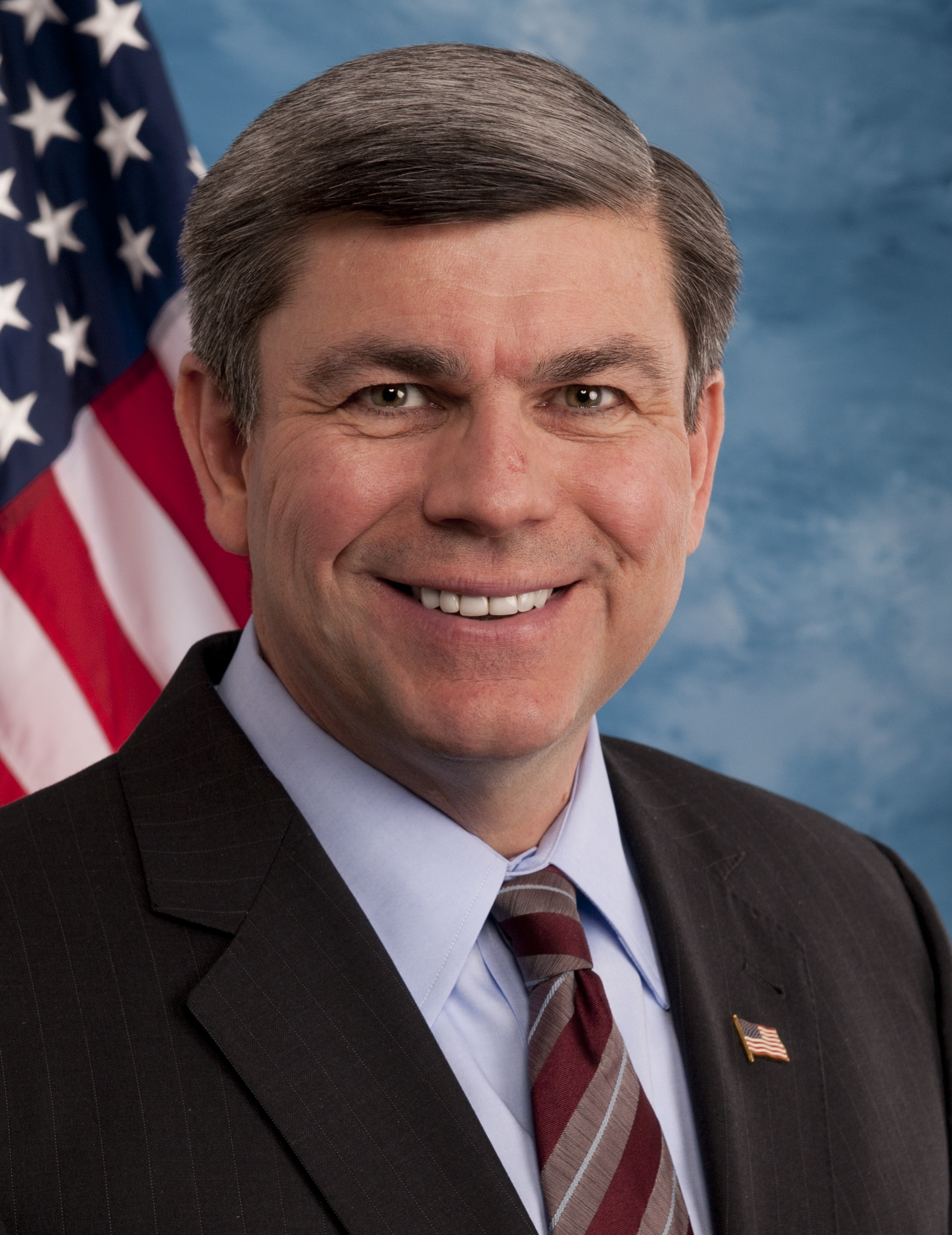
Nominee	Asa Hutchinson	Mike Ross
Party	Republican	Democratic
Popular vote	470,429	352,115
Percentage	55.4%	41.5%
- County results
Governor before election
Mike Beebe
Democratic
Elected Governor
Asa Hutchinson
Republican

Governor Mike Beebe was term-limited in 2014. Former representative Mike Ross was the Democratic nominee, while former representative Asa Hutchinson was the Republican nominee.

Hutchinson won the election.

Arkansas general election
Party	Candidate	Votes	%
Republican	Asa Hutchinson	470,429	55.44
Democratic	Mike Ross	352,115	41.49
Libertarian	Frank Gilbert	16,319	1.92
Green	Josh Drake	9,729	1.15
Total votes		848,592	100.00
Republican gain from Democratic			

== California ==
2014 California gubernatorial election
- November 4, 2014
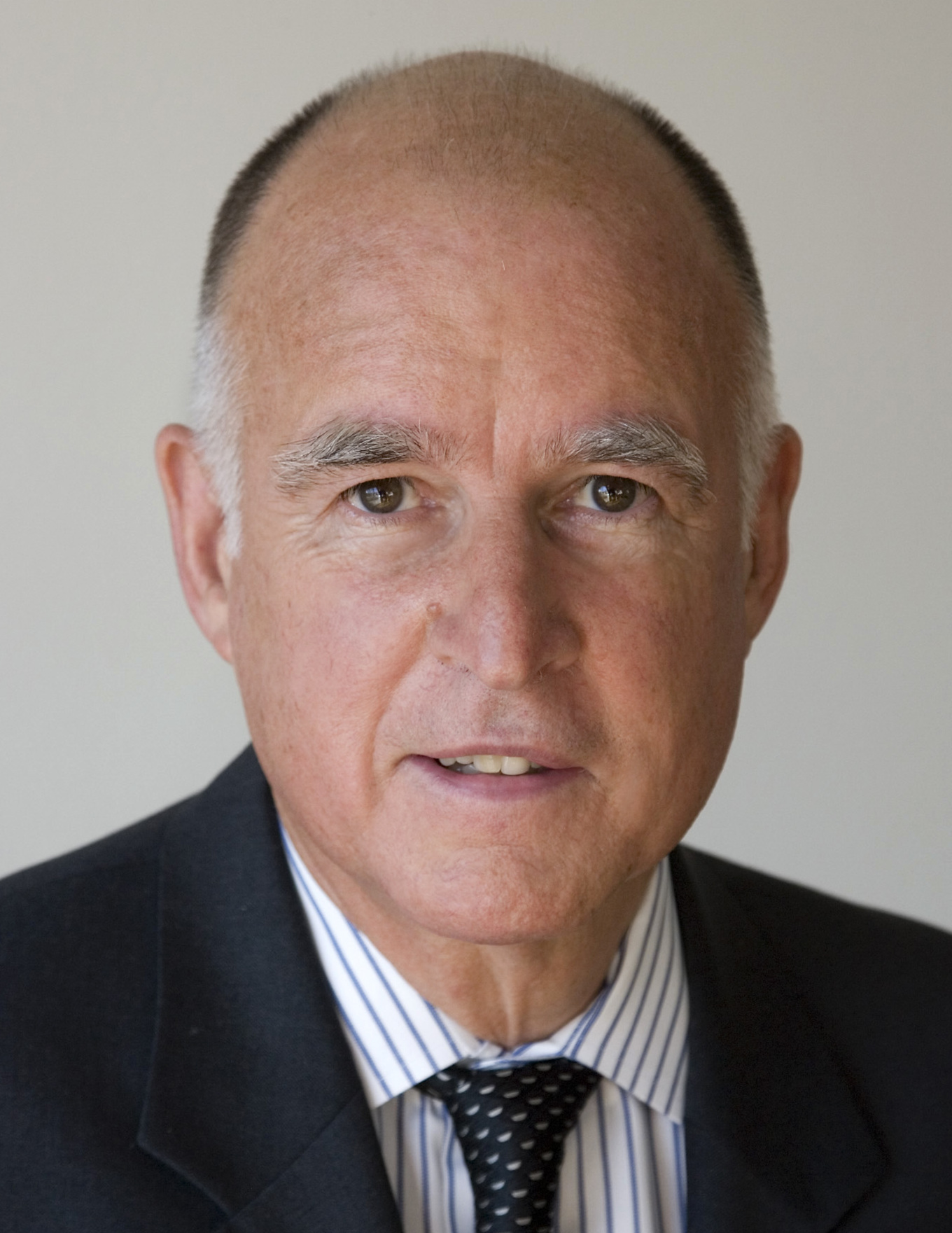

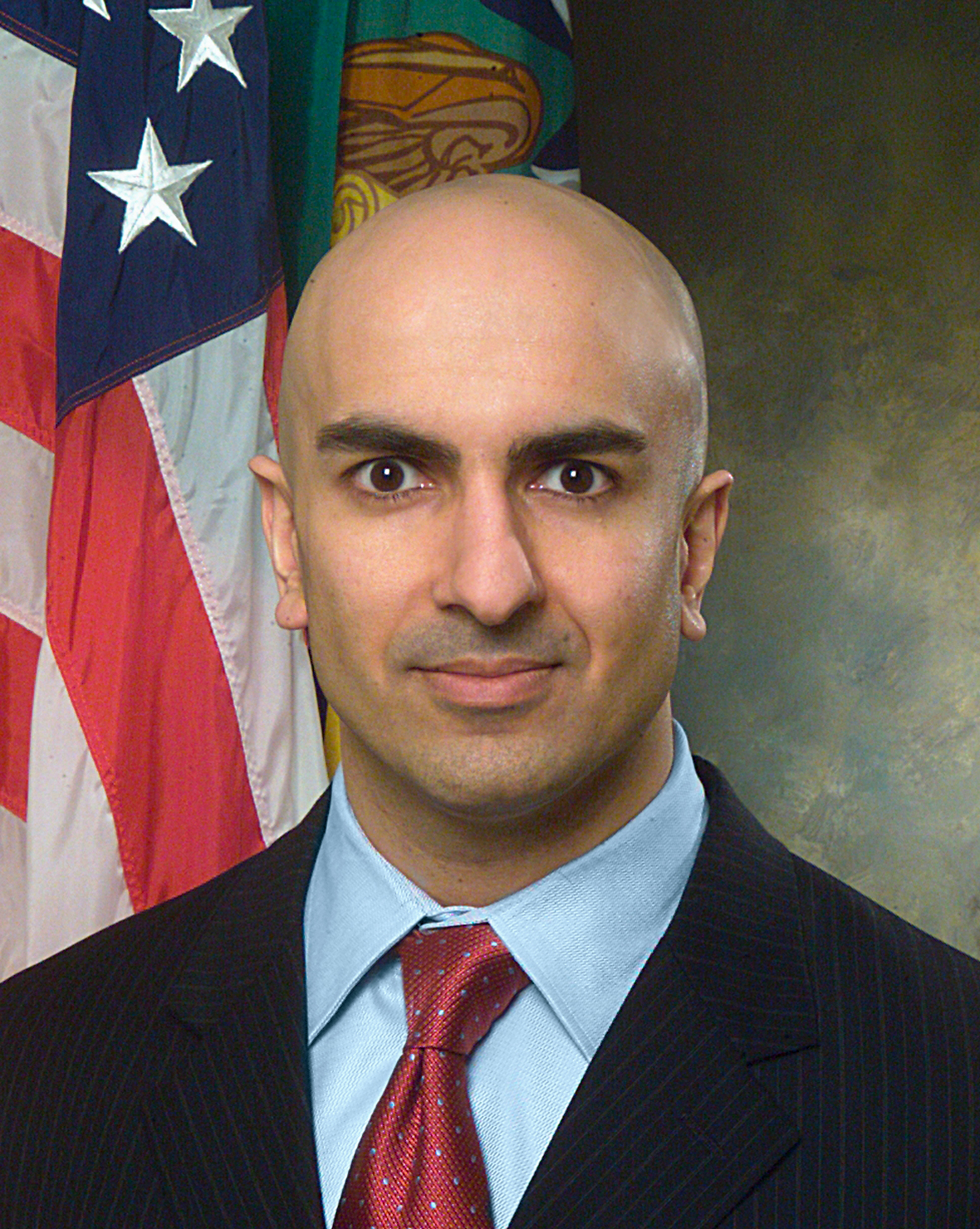
Nominee	Jerry Brown	Neel Kashkari
Party	Democratic	Republican
Popular vote	4,388,368	2,929,213
Percentage	60.0%	40.0%
- County results
Governor before election
Jerry Brown
Democratic
Elected Governor
Jerry Brown
Democratic

Governor Jerry Brown sought re-election. He was elected to a third non-consecutive term with 53.1% of the vote in 2010, having previously served as governor from 1975 to 1983.

State Assemblyman Tim Donnelly and former U.S. Treasury Department Official Neel Kashkari were running for the Republican nomination. Former lieutenant governor Abel Maldonado launched a campaign but then withdrew. With 19 percent of the vote Kashkari came in second after Governor Jerry Brown (54 percent) under California's new Nonpartisan blanket primary.

California general election
Party	Candidate	Votes	%
Democratic	Jerry Brown (incumbent)	4,388,368	59.97
Republican	Neel Kashkari	2,929,213	40.03
Total votes		7,317,581	100.00
Democratic hold			

== Colorado ==
2014 Colorado gubernatorial election
- November 4, 2014
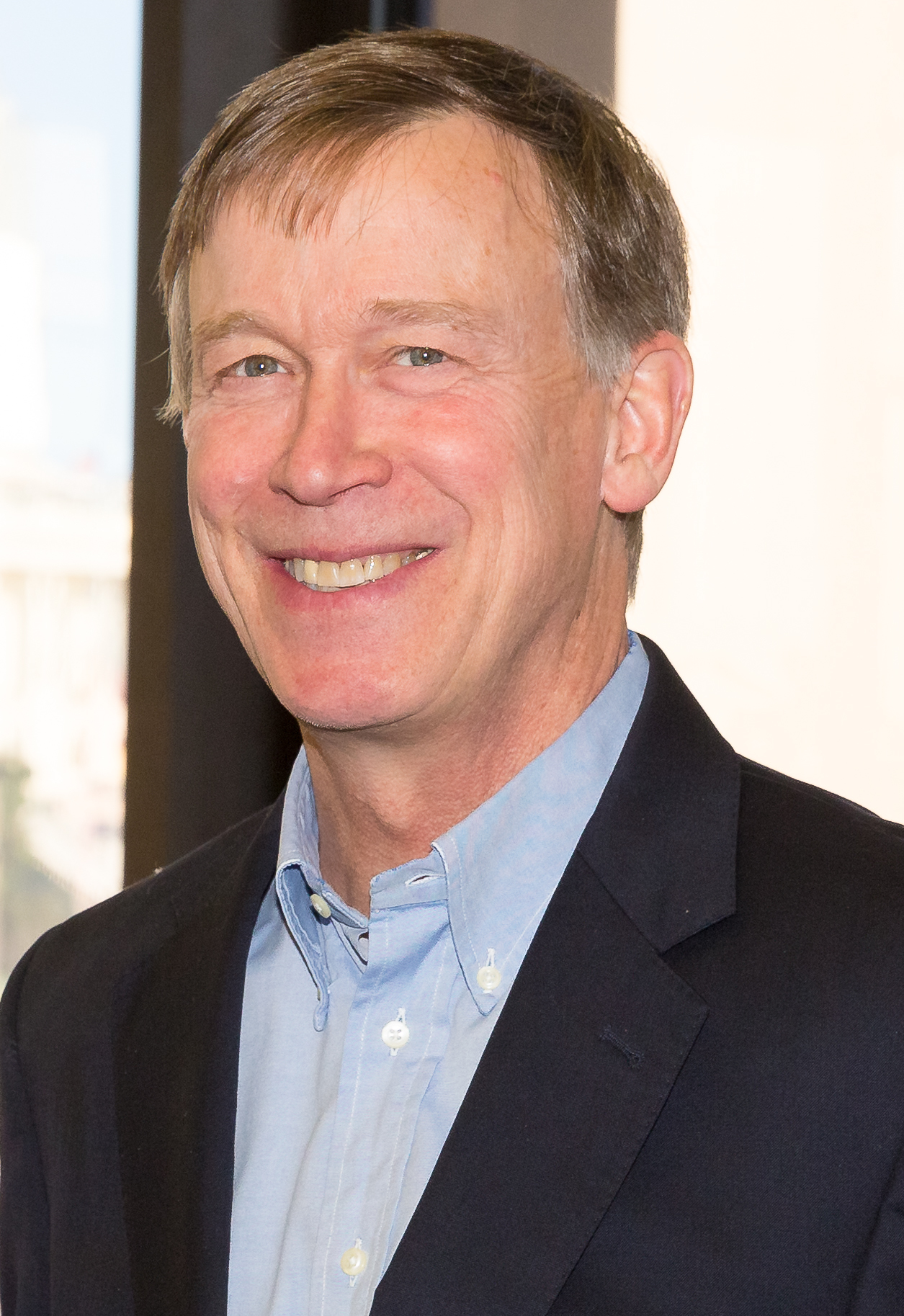

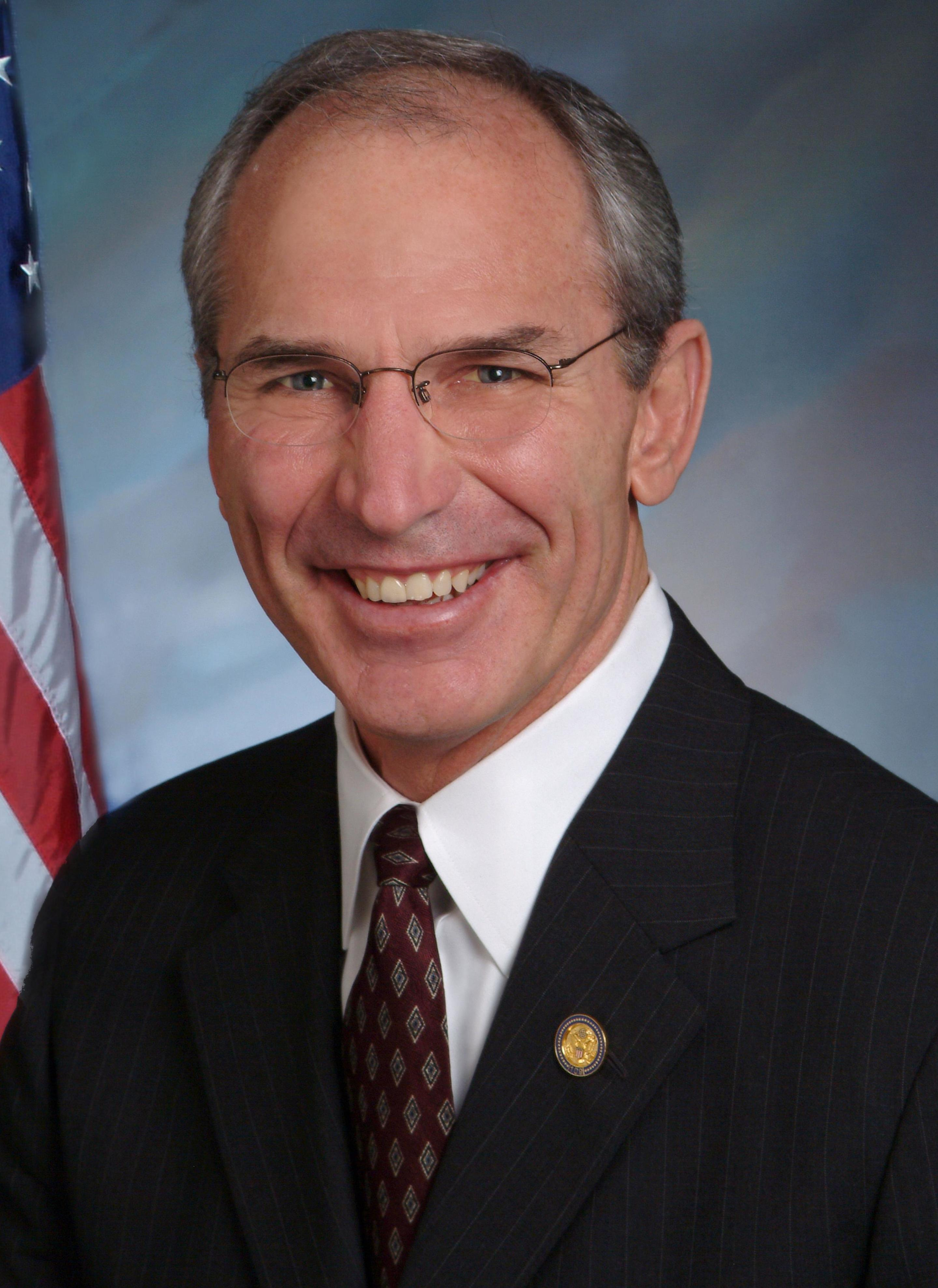
Nominee	John Hickenlooper	Bob Beauprez
Party	Democratic	Republican
Running mate	Joe Garcia	Jill Repella
Popular vote	1,006,433	938,195
Percentage	49.3%	46.0%
- County results
Governor before election
John Hickenlooper
Democratic
Elected Governor
John Hickenlooper
Democratic

Governor John Hickenlooper sought re-election. Hickenlooper was elected with 50.7% of the vote in 2010.

State Senator Greg Brophy, former congressman Tom Tancredo, Colorado secretary of state Scott Gessler, and former congressman Bob Beauprez all ran for the Republican nomination. Beauprez was the Republican nominee.

Hickenlooper won re-election to a second term.

Colorado general election
Party	Candidate	Votes	%
Democratic	John Hickenlooper (incumbent)	1,006,433	49.30
Republican	Bob Beauprez	938,195	45.95
Libertarian	Matthew Hess	39,590	1.94
Green	Harry Hempy	27,391	1.34
Independent	Mike Dunafon	24,042	1.18
Independent	Paul Fiorino	5,923	0.29
Write-in		31	0.00
Total votes		2,041,605	100.00
Democratic hold			

== Connecticut ==
2014 Connecticut gubernatorial election
- November 4, 2014
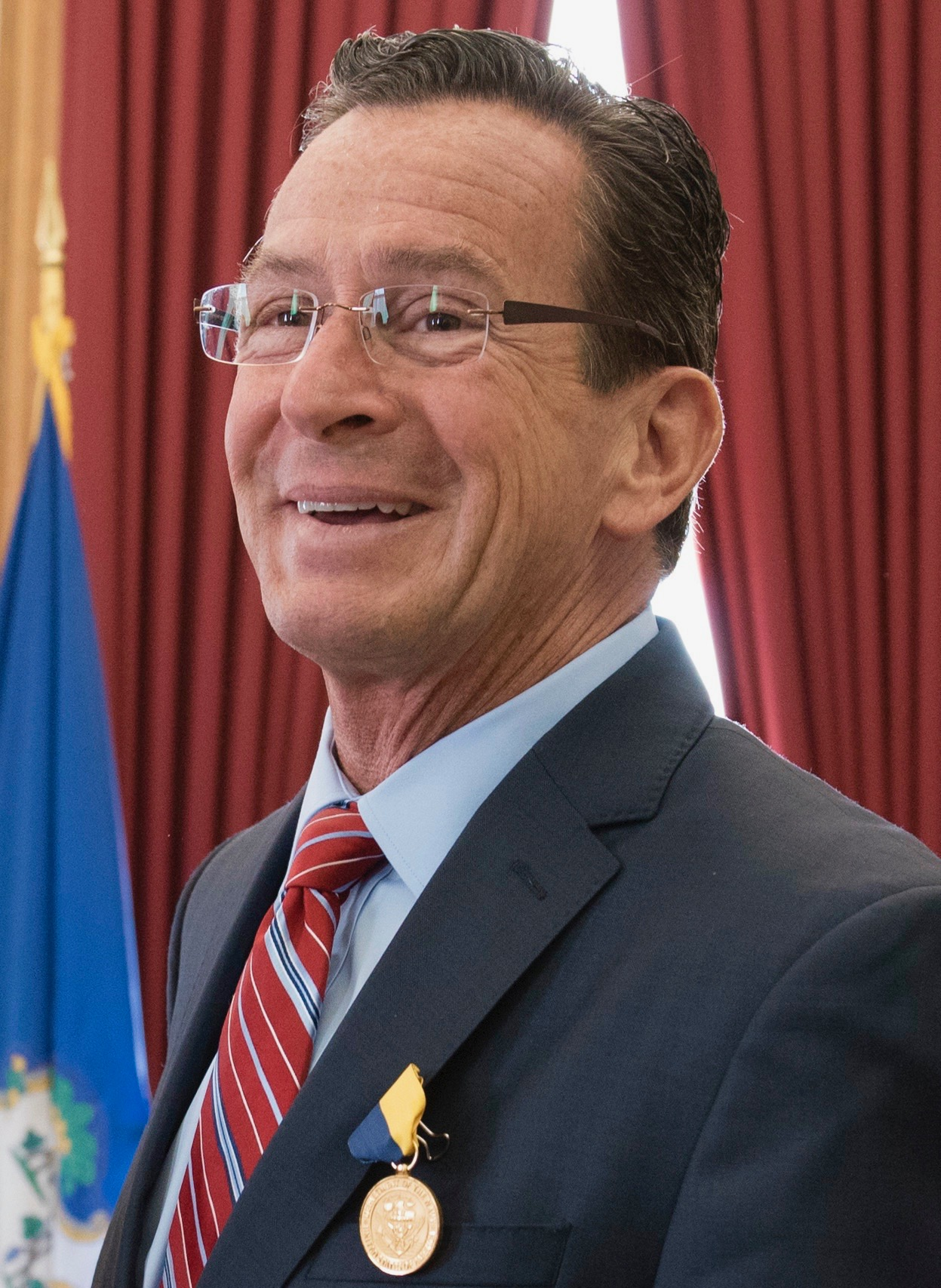

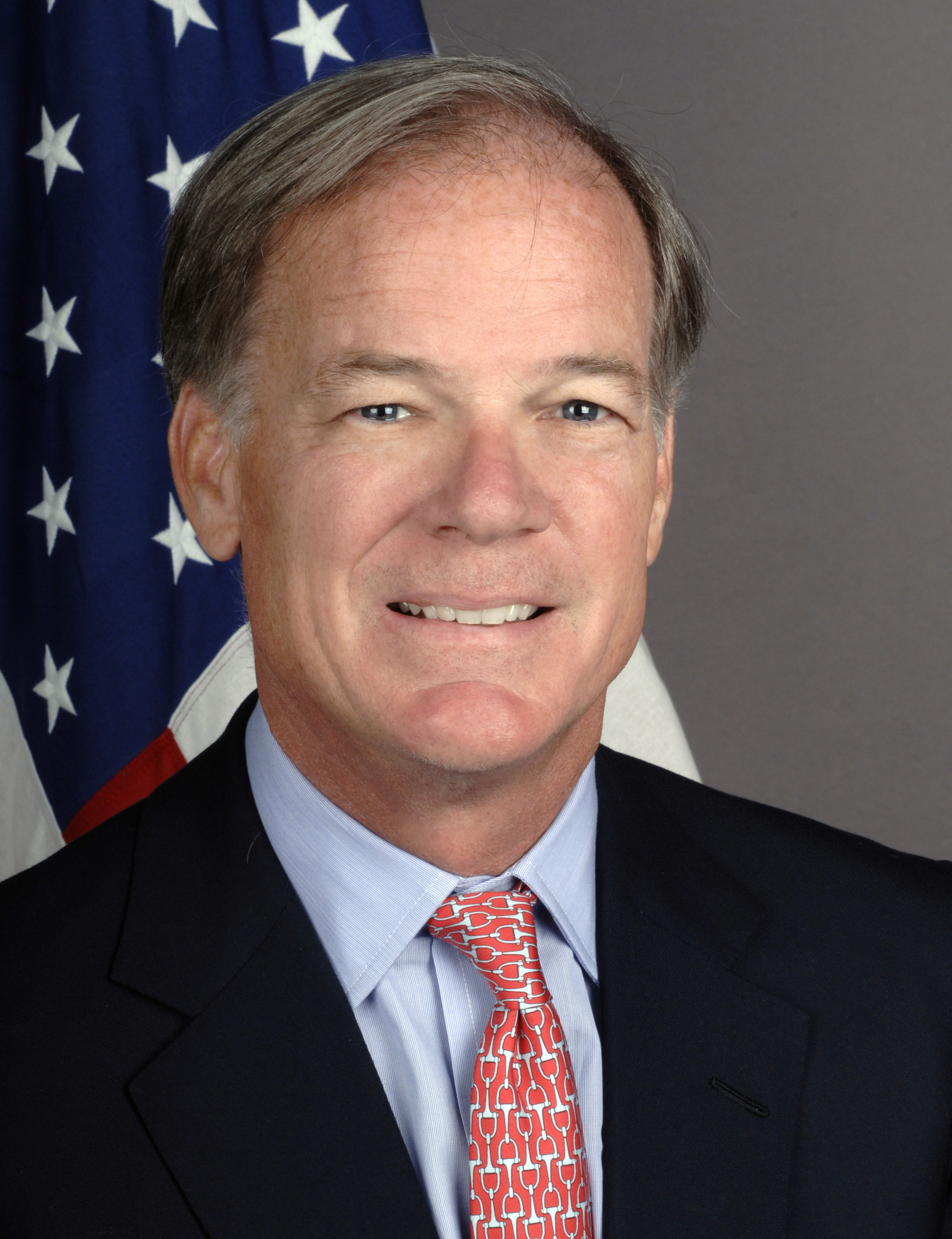
Nominee	Dannel Malloy	Thomas C. Foley
Party	Democratic	Republican
Popular vote	554,314	526,295
Percentage	50.7%	48.2%
- County results
Governor before election
Dannel Malloy
Democratic
Elected Governor
Dannel Malloy
Democratic

Governor Dan Malloy sought re-election. Malloy was elected with 49.51% of the vote in 2010.

Former U.S. ambassador to Ireland and 2010 Republican gubernatorial candidate Thomas C. Foley challenged Malloy again after losing by less than 1% of the vote in 2010.

Malloy won re-election to a second term.

Connecticut general election
Party	Candidate	Votes	%
Democratic	Dannel Malloy (incumbent)	554,314	50.73
Republican	Thomas C. Foley	526,295	48.16
Independent	Joe Visconti	11,456	1.05
Write-in		708	0.06
Total votes		1,092,773	100.00
Democratic hold			

== Florida ==
2014 Florida gubernatorial election
- November 4, 2014
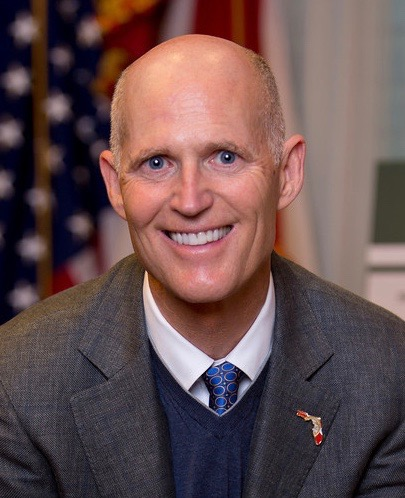

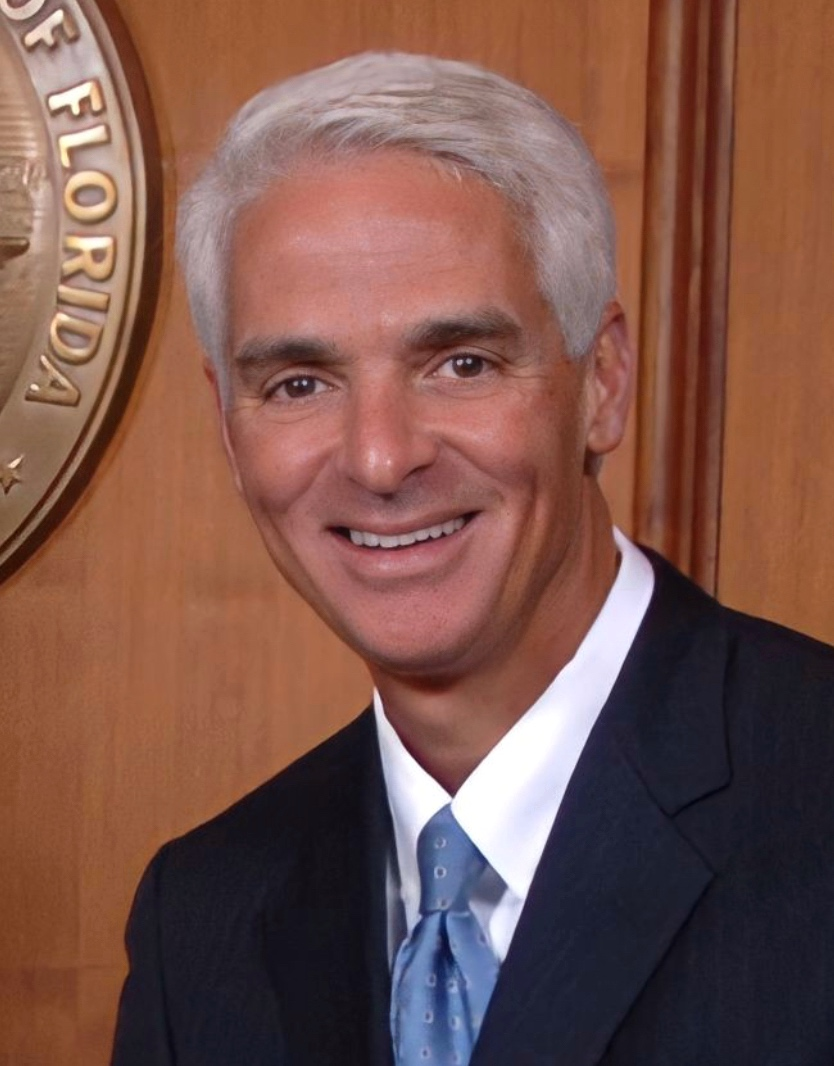
Nominee	Rick Scott	Charlie Crist
Party	Republican	Democratic
Running mate	Carlos Lopez-Cantera	Annette Taddeo
Popular vote	2,865,343	2,801,198
Percentage	48.1%	47.1%
- County results
Governor before election
Rick Scott
Republican
Elected Governor
Rick Scott
Republican

Governor Rick Scott was elected with 48.9% of the vote in 2010, defeating then-Chief Financial Officer of Florida Alex Sink by a margin of just over 1 percent. He announced his bid for a second term and faced former Republican governor turned Democrat Charlie Crist and Libertarian Adrian Wyllie.

Democratic state senator Nan Rich lost to Charlie Crist in the primary.

Economist and 2010 Independent nominee for governor Farid Khavari also ran.

Scott won re-election to a second term.

Florida general election
Party	Candidate	Votes	%
Republican	Rick Scott (incumbent)	2,865,343	48.14
Democratic	Charlie Crist	2,801,198	47.07
Libertarian	Adrian Wyllie	223,356	3.75
Independent	Glenn Burkett	41,341	0.70
Independent	Farid Khavari	20,186	0.34
Write-in		137	0.00
Total votes		5,951,571	100.00
Republican hold			

== Georgia ==
2014 Georgia gubernatorial election
- November 4, 2014
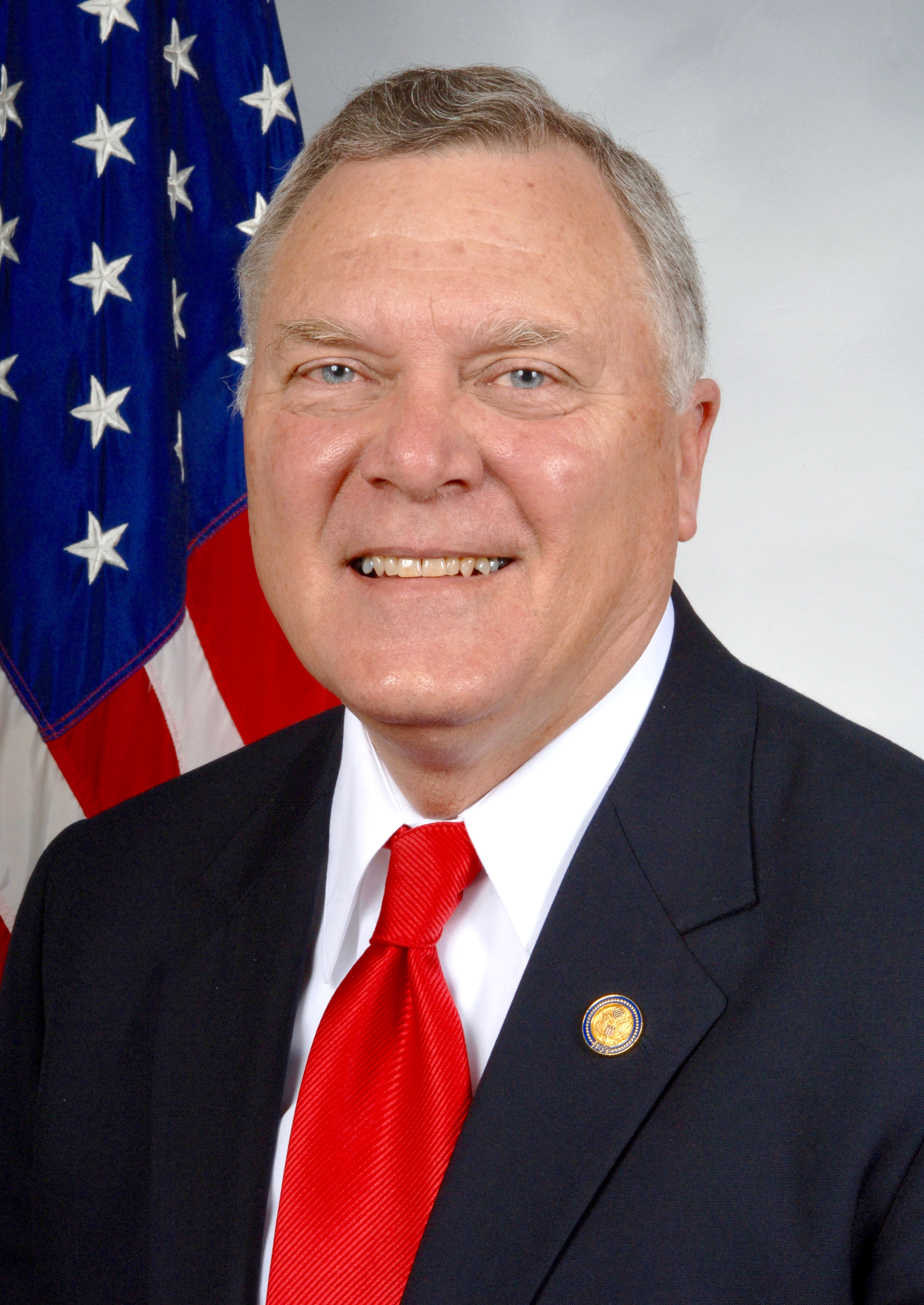

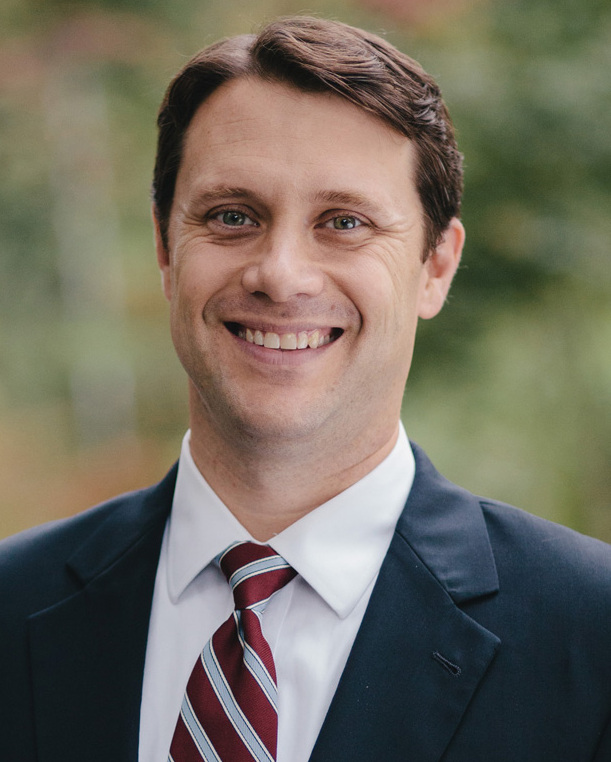
Nominee	Nathan Deal	Jason Carter
Party	Republican	Democratic
Popular vote	1,345,237	1,144,794
Percentage	52.7%	44.9%
- County results
Governor before election
Nathan Deal
Republican
Elected Governor
Nathan Deal
Republican

Governor Nathan Deal sought re-election. Deal was elected with 53% of the vote in 2010.

State School Superintendent John Barge and Mayor of Dalton David Pennington also ran for the Republican nomination.

State Senator Jason Carter, the grandson of former president and Governor Jimmy Carter, ran for the Democratic nomination. Connie Stokes, a former Georgia state senator and DeKalb County commissioner, was running for governor, but decided to run for lieutenant governor instead. Carter won the gubernatorial nomination.

Deal won re-election to a second term.

Georgia general election
Party	Candidate	Votes	%
Republican	Nathan Deal (incumbent)	1,345,237	52.74
Democratic	Jason Carter	1,144,794	44.88
Libertarian	Andrew Hunt	60,185	2.36
Write-in		432	0.02
Total votes		2,550,648	100.00
Republican hold			

== Hawaii ==
2014 Hawaii gubernatorial election
- November 4, 2014
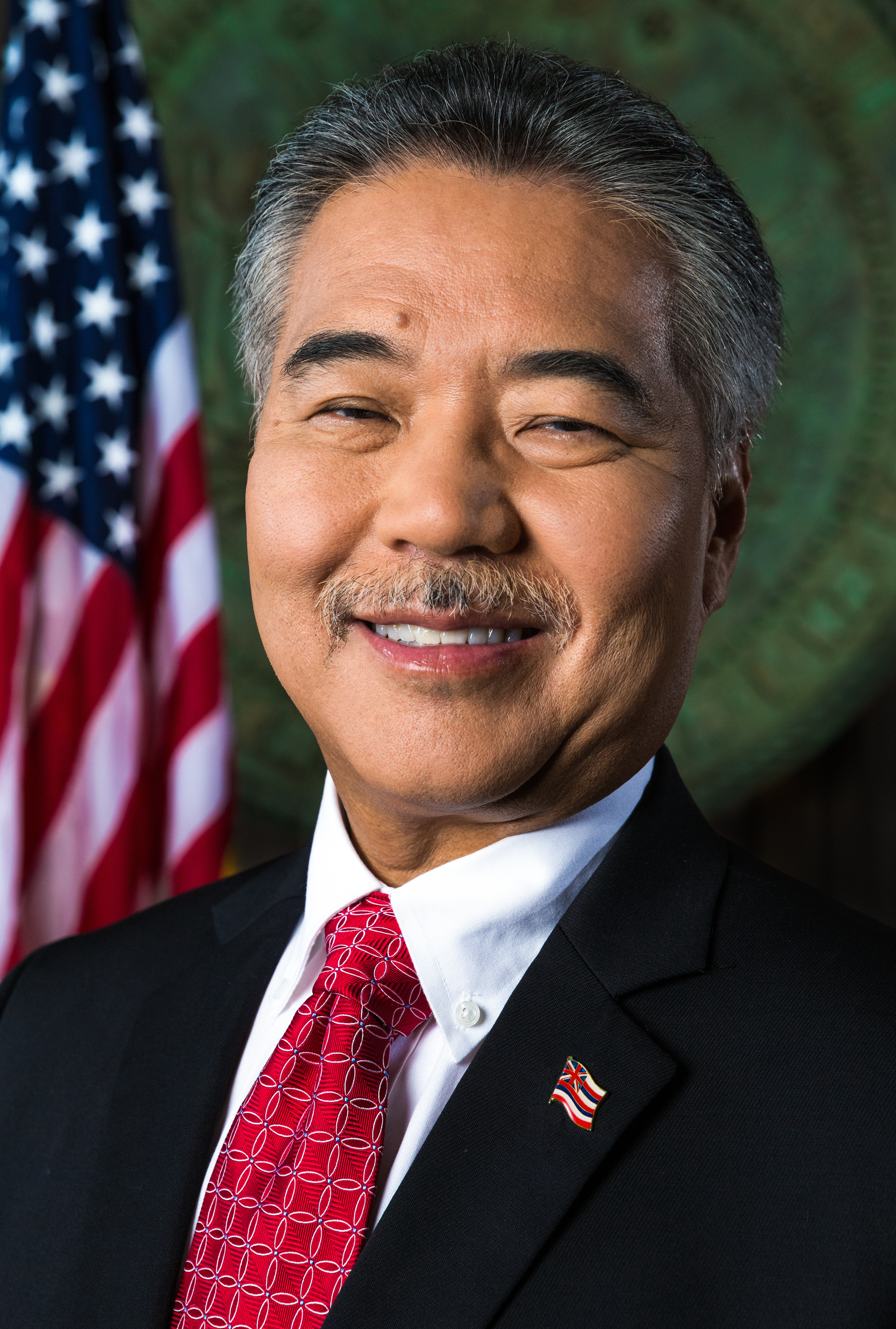

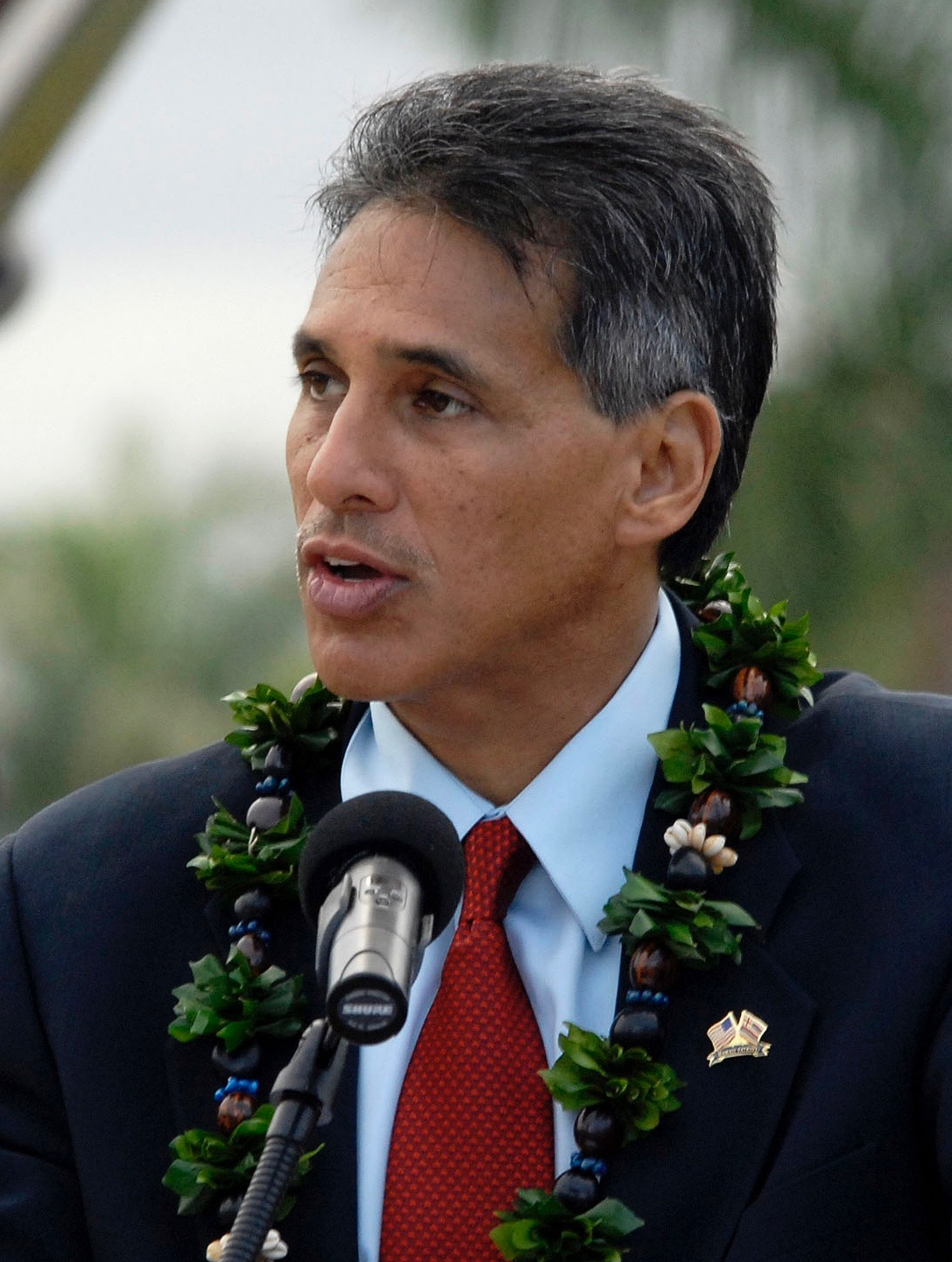

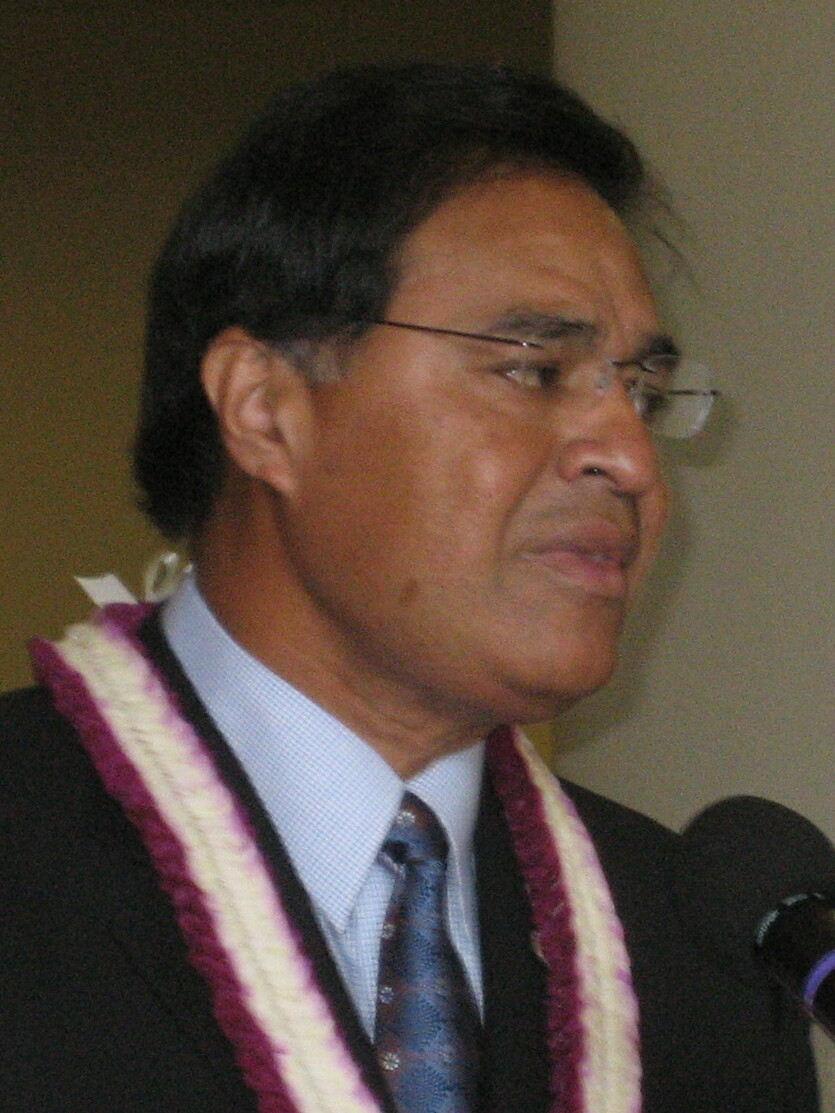
Nominee	David Ige	Duke Aiona	Mufi Hannemann
Party	Democratic	Republican	Independent
Running mate	Shan Tsutsui	Elwin Ahu	Les Chang
Popular vote	181,106	135,775	42,934
Percentage	49.5%	37.1%	11.7%
- County results
Governor before election
Neil Abercrombie
Democratic
Elected Governor
David Ige
Democratic

Governor Neil Abercrombie launched his re-election campaign on April 29, 2013; sought a second term in 2014. Abercrombie was elected with 58.2% of the vote in 2010 over former lieutenant governor Duke Aiona. However, in 2014, State Senator David Ige challenged Abercrombie for the Democratic nomination, and successfully defeated Abercrombie for the nomination in a landslide victory during the state's primary election on August 9, 2014. Abercrombie's primary election defeat was the first in Hawaii history for a governor, and marked the first time an incumbent governor lost re-election since William F. Quinn's defeat in 1962.

In the midst of Abercrombie's loss, former lieutenant governor Duke Aiona won the Republican nomination for governor for the second time, and former Honolulu mayor Mufi Hannemann won his primary as an independent. They along with David Ige advanced to the gubernatorial general election. Ige won the election.

Hawaii general election
Party	Candidate	Votes	%
Democratic	David Ige	181,106	49.45
Republican	Duke Aiona	135,775	37.08
Independent	Mufi Hannemann	42,934	11.72
Libertarian	Jeff Davis	6,395	1.75
Total votes		366,210	100.00
Democratic hold			

== Idaho ==
2014 Idaho gubernatorial election
- November 4, 2014
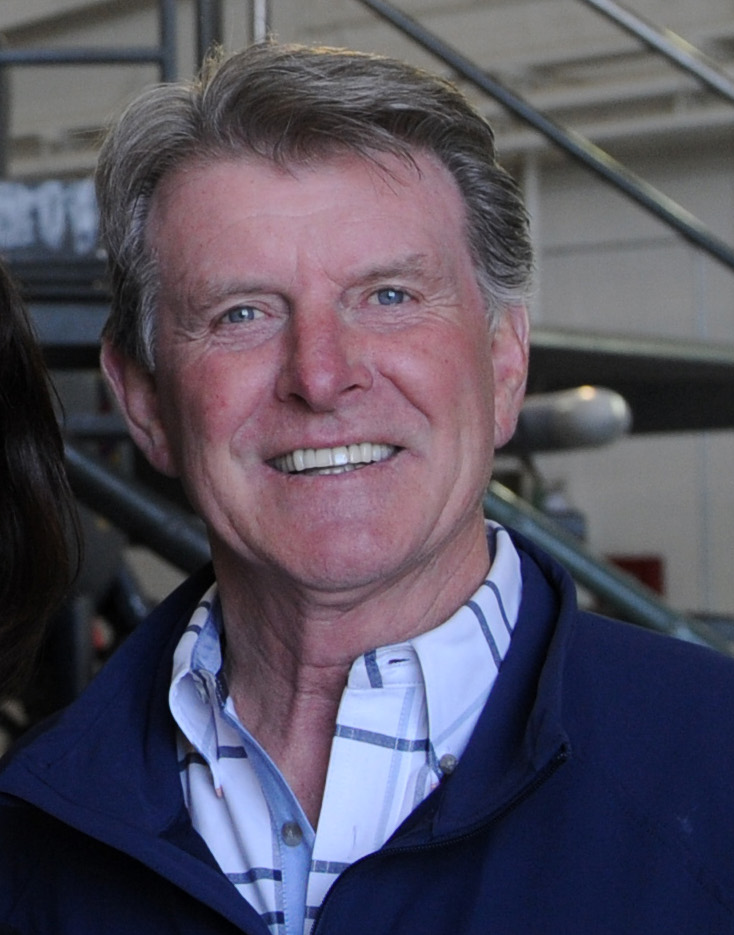

Nominee	Butch Otter	A. J. Balukoff
Party	Republican	Democratic
Popular vote	235,405	169,556
Percentage	53.5%	38.6%
- County results
Governor before election
Butch Otter
Republican
Elected Governor
Butch Otter
Republican

Governor Butch Otter sought a third term. Otter was elected to a second term with 59.1% of the vote in 2010. State Senator Russ Fulcher unsuccessfully challenged Otter for the Republican nomination.

A. J. Balukoff, President of the Boise School Board, won the Democratic nomination.

Otter won re-election to a third term.

Idaho general election
Party	Candidate	Votes	%
Republican	Butch Otter (incumbent)	235,405	53.52
Democratic	A. J. Balukoff	169,556	38.55
Libertarian	John Bujak	17,884	4.07
Independent	Jill Humble	8,801	2.00
Constitution	Steven Pankey	5,219	1.19
Independent	Pro-Life	2,870	0.65
Write-in		95	0.02
Total votes		439,830	100.00
Republican hold			

== Illinois ==
2014 Illinois gubernatorial election
- November 4, 2014
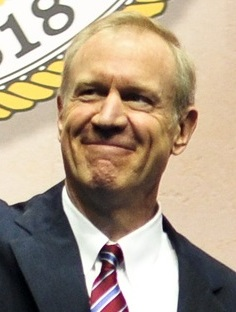

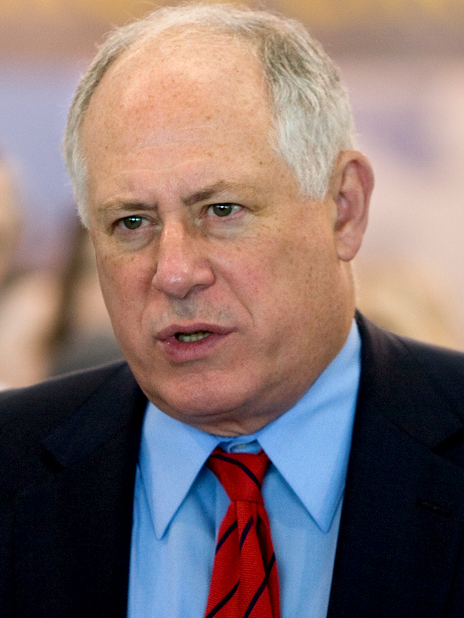
Nominee	Bruce Rauner	Pat Quinn
Party	Republican	Democratic
Running mate	Evelyn Sanguinetti	Paul Vallas
Popular vote	1,823,627	1,681,343
Percentage	50.3%	46.4%
- County results
Governor before election
Pat Quinn
Democratic
Elected Governor
Bruce Rauner
Republican

Democratic Governor Pat Quinn sought re-election, but was defeated by Businessman Bruce Rauner. Quinn was elected to a full term with 46.6% of the vote in 2010.

Businessman Bruce Rauner, Treasurer Dan Rutherford, and state senators Kirk Dillard and Bill Brady ran for the Republican nomination.

On March 18, 2014, Bruce Rauner won the primary and the GOP nomination with 40.1% of the vote.

Illinois general election
Party	Candidate	Votes	%
Republican	Bruce Rauner	1,823,627	50.27
Democratic	Pat Quinn (incumbent)	1,681,343	46.35
Libertarian	Chad Grimm	121,534	3.35
Write-in		1,186	0.03
Total votes		3,627,690	100.00
Republican gain from Democratic			

== Iowa ==
2014 Iowa gubernatorial election
- November 4, 2014
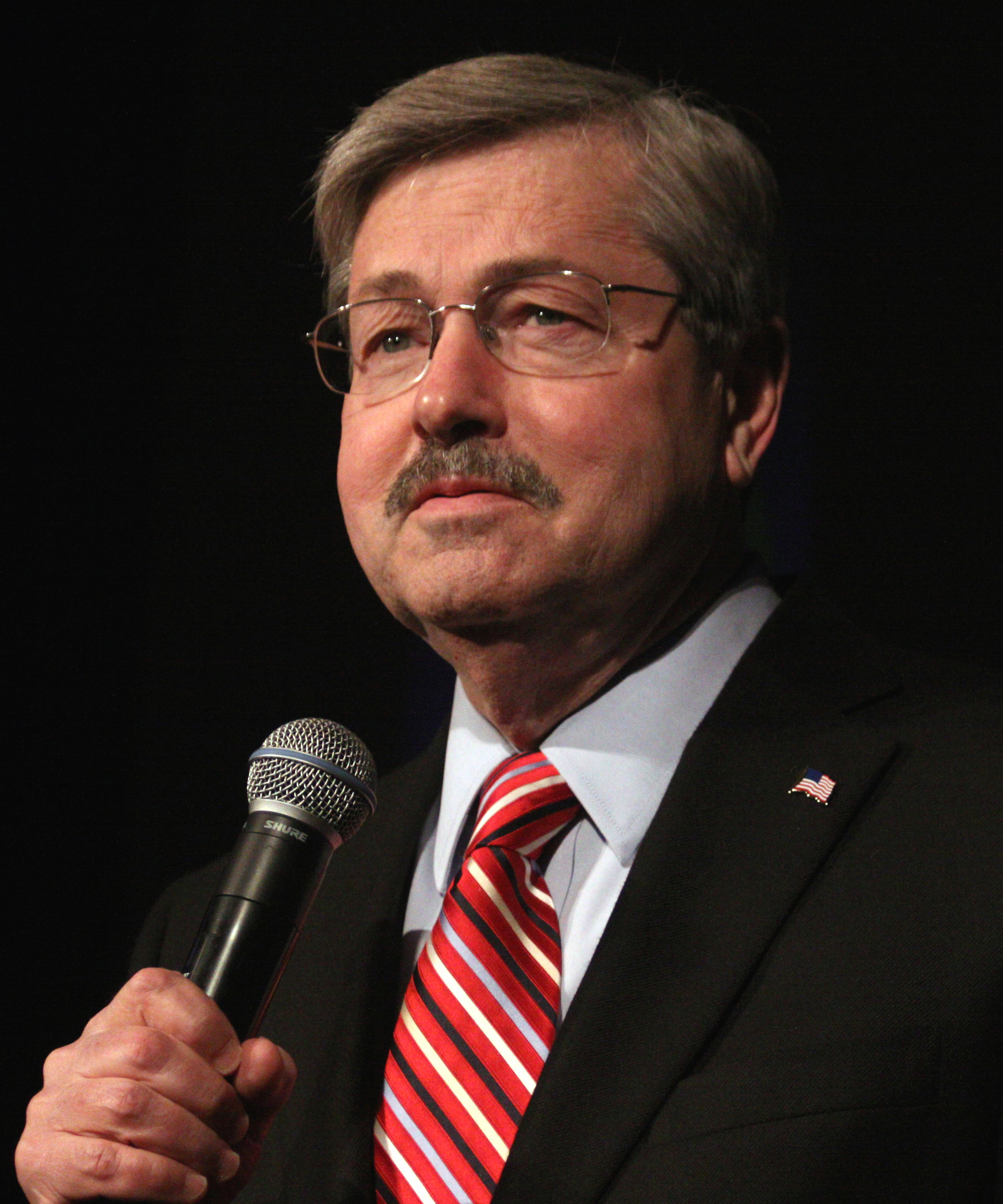

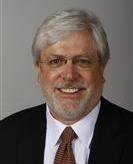
Nominee	Terry Branstad	Jack Hatch
Party	Republican	Democratic
Running mate	Kim Reynolds	Monica Vernon
Popular vote	666,032	420,787
Percentage	59.0%	37.3%
- County results
Governor before election
Terry Branstad
Republican
Elected Governor
Terry Branstad
Republican

Governor Terry Branstad sought a sixth non-consecutive term. He was elected to a fifth term (non-consecutive) with 53% of the vote in 2010. Political activist Tom Hoefling unsuccessfully challenged Branstad for the Republican nomination.

Assistant Majority Leader of the Iowa State Senate Jack Hatch former Des Moines school board member Jonathan Narcisse and Webster bus driver Paul Dahl, sought the Democratic nomination. Hatch won.

Branstad won re-election and became the longest-serving governor in US history.

Iowa general election
Party	Candidate	Votes	%
Republican	Terry Branstad (incumbent)	666,032	58.99
Democratic	Jack Hatch	420,787	37.27
Libertarian	Lee Hieb	20,321	1.80
Independent	Jim Hennager	10,582	0.94
Independent	Jonathan Narcisse	10,240	0.91
Write-in		1,095	0.09
Total votes		1,129,057	100.00
Republican hold			

== Kansas ==
2014 Kansas gubernatorial election
- November 4, 2014
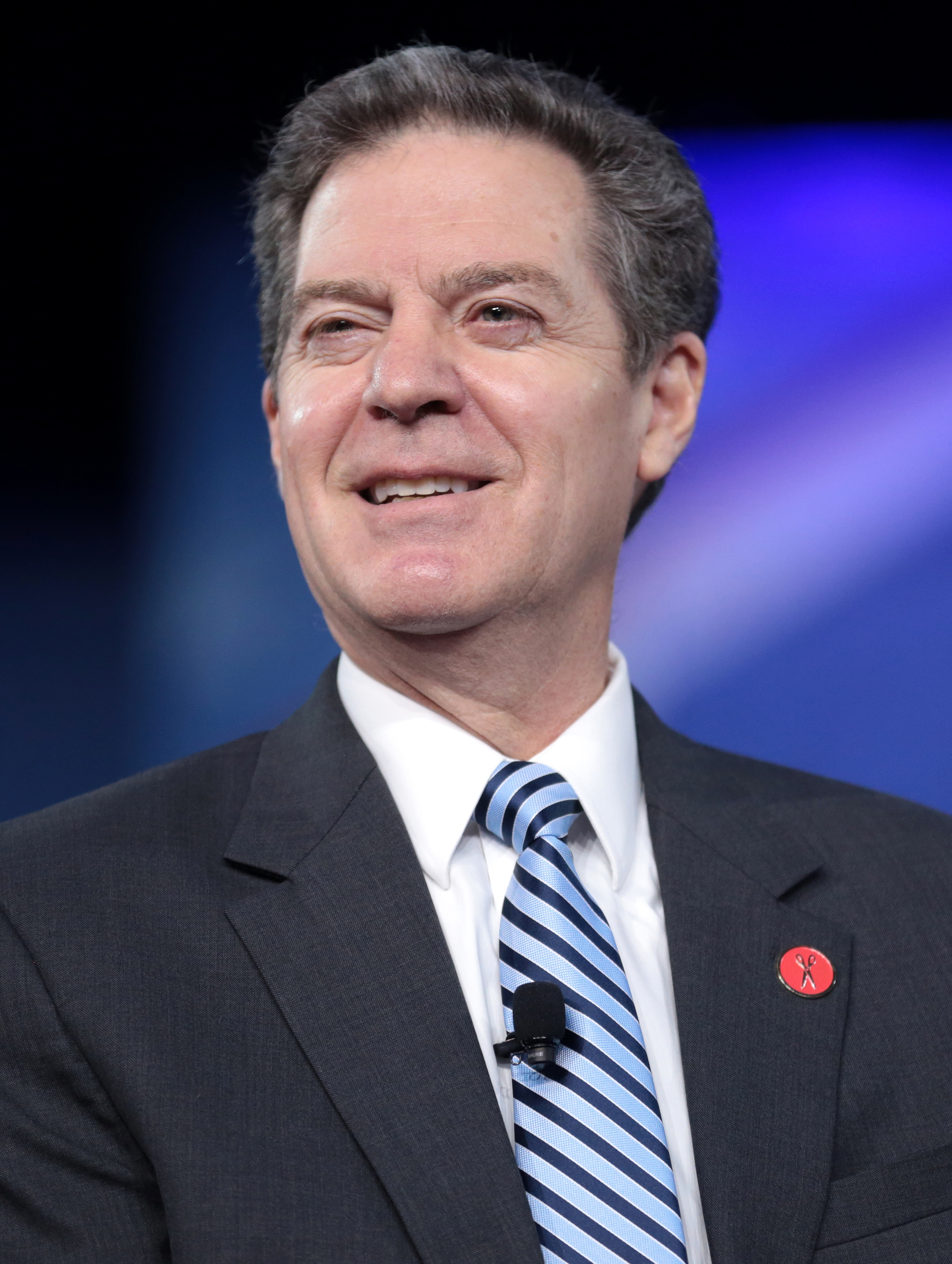

Nominee	Sam Brownback	Paul Davis
Party	Republican	Democratic
Running mate	Jeff Colyer	Jill Docking
Popular vote	433,196	401,100
Percentage	49.8%	46.1%
- County results
Governor before election
Sam Brownback
Republican
Elected Governor
Sam Brownback
Republican

Governor Sam Brownback sought re-election. Brownback was elected with 63.4% of the vote in 2010. He easily won the Republican nomination.

Paul Davis, Minority Leader of the Kansas House of Representatives, successfully ran for the Democratic nomination. According to The Fix, Democrats saw this as the "sleeper race" of 2014.

Brownback won re-election to a second term.

Kansas general election
Party	Candidate	Votes	%
Republican	Sam Brownback (incumbent)	433,196	49.82
Democratic	Paul Davis	401,100	46.13
Libertarian	Keen Umbehr	35,206	4.05
Total votes		869,502	100.00
Republican hold			

== Maine ==
2014 Maine gubernatorial election
- November 4, 2014
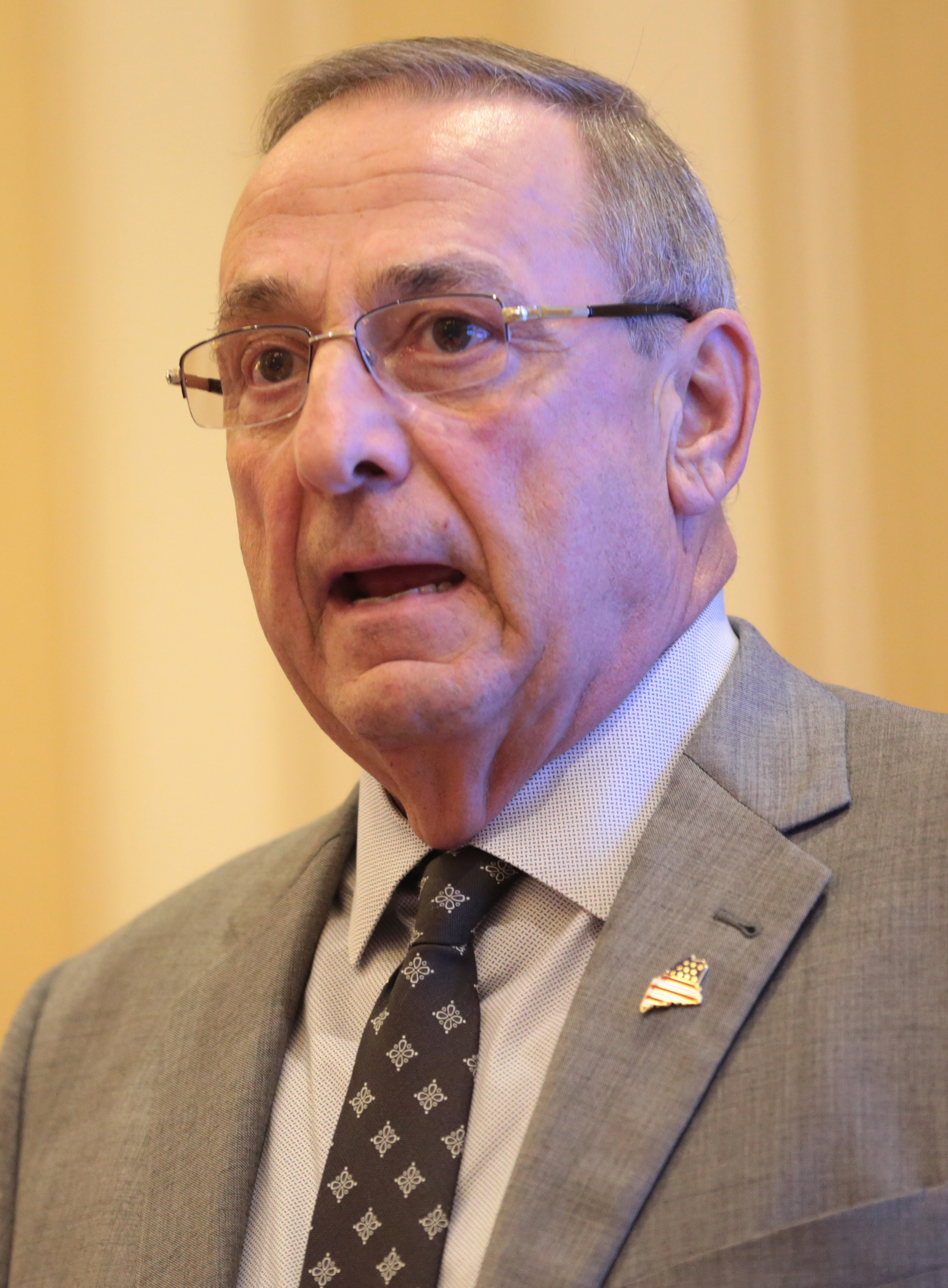

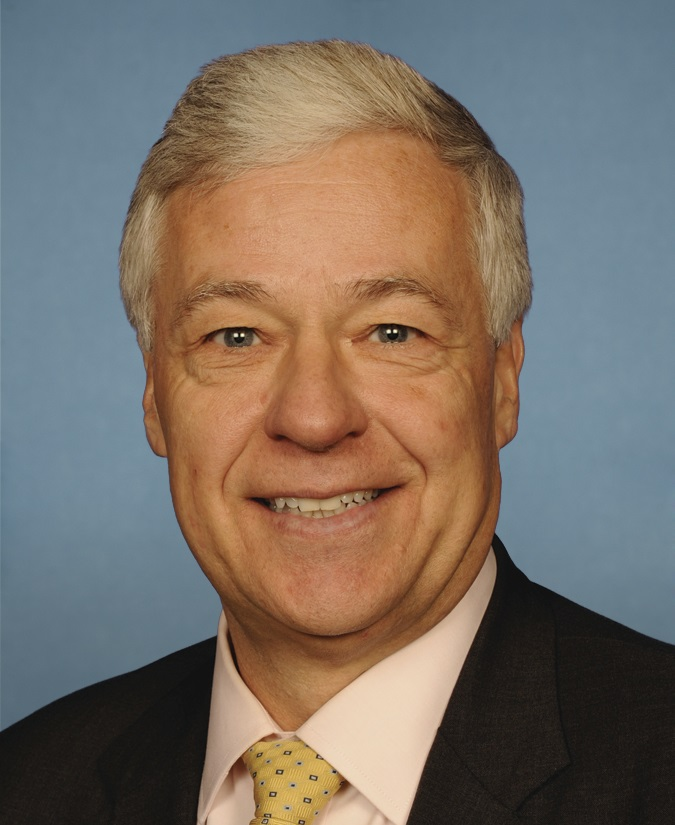

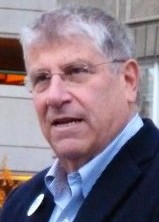
Nominee	Paul LePage	Mike Michaud	Eliot Cutler
Party	Republican	Democratic	Independent
Popular vote	294,533	265,125	51,518
Percentage	48.2%	43.4%	8.4%
- County results
Governor before election
Paul LePage
Republican
Elected Governor
Paul LePage
Republican

Governor Paul LePage sought a second term. LePage was elected with 38.3% of the vote in a competitive three member race in 2010. He easily won the Republican nomination.

Representative Mike Michaud successfully ran for the Democratic nomination. Independent candidate Eliot Cutler, who finished second in Maine's 2010 gubernatorial election, also ran against LePage.

LePage won re-election to a second term.

Maine general election
Party	Candidate	Votes	%
Republican	Paul LePage (incumbent)	294,519	48.19
Democratic	Mike Michaud	265,114	43.37
Independent	Eliot Cutler	51,515	8.43
Write-in		79	0.01
Total votes		611,227	100.00
Republican hold			

== Maryland ==
2014 Maryland gubernatorial election
- November 4, 2014
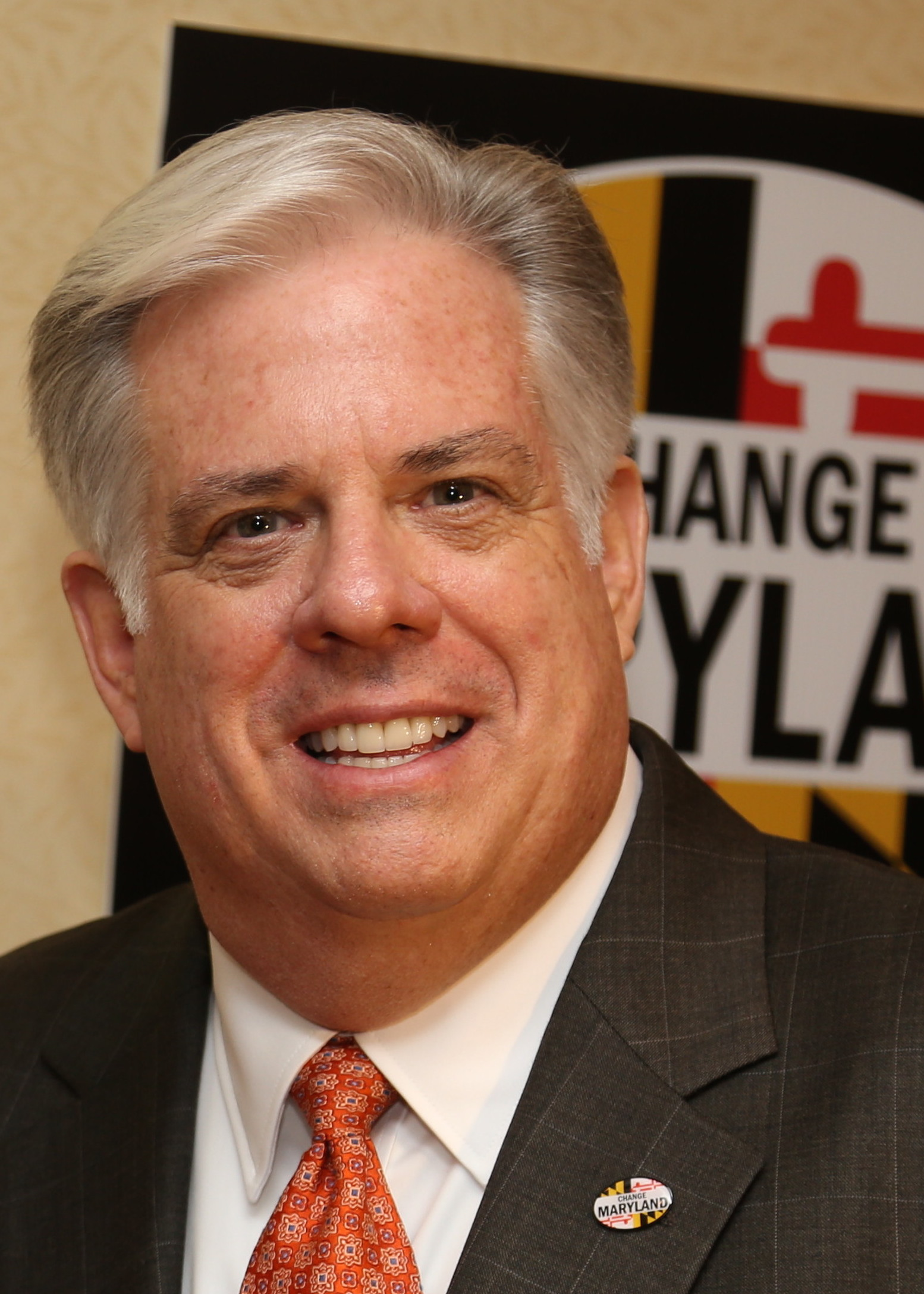

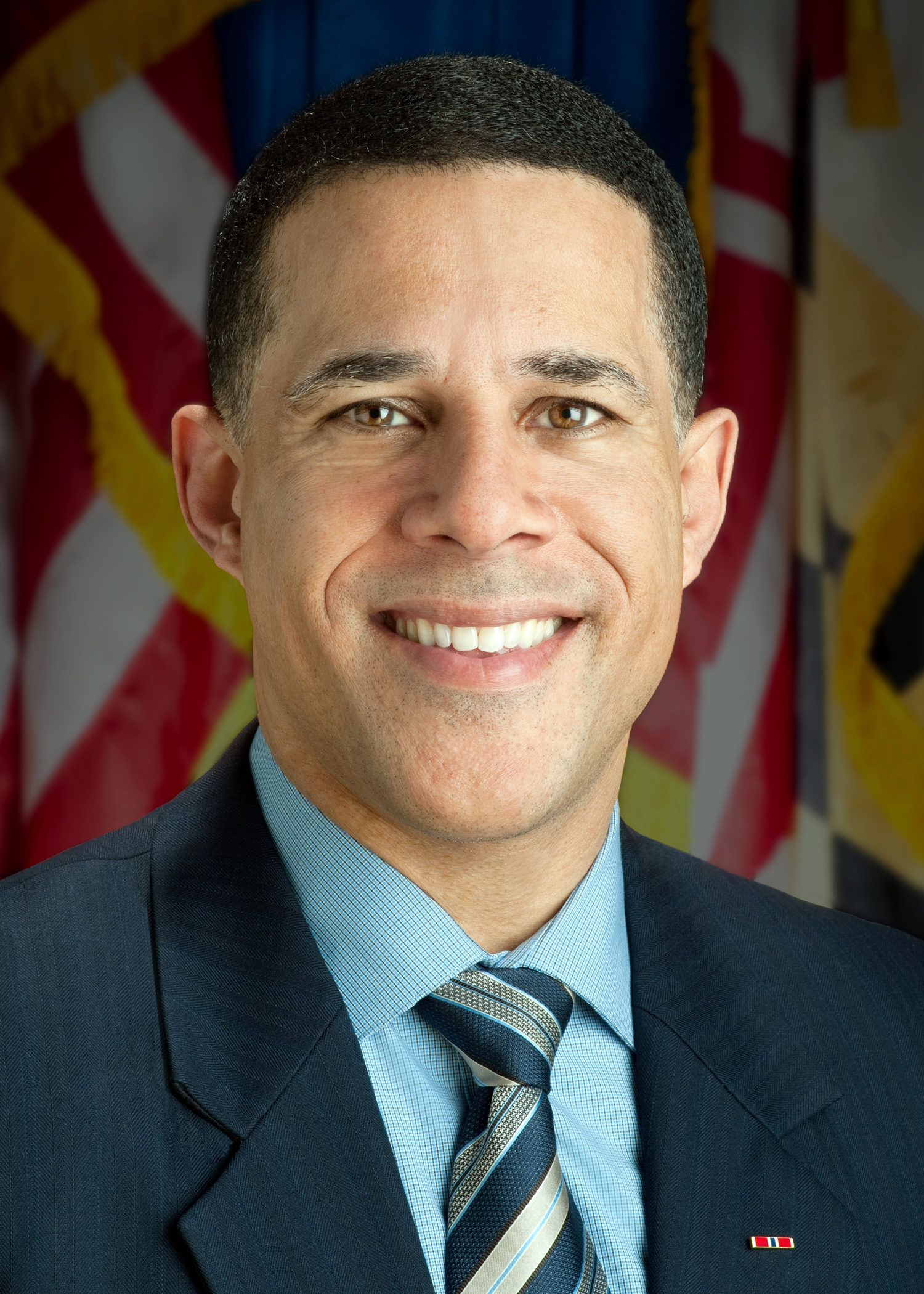
Nominee	Larry Hogan	Anthony Brown
Party	Republican	Democratic
Running mate	Boyd Rutherford	Kenneth Ulman
Popular vote	884,400	818,890
Percentage	51.0%	47.3%
- County results
Governor before election
Martin O'Malley
Democratic
Elected Governor
Larry Hogan
Republican

Governor Martin O'Malley was term-limited in 2014.

O'Malley endorsed Lieutenant Governor Anthony Brown to succeed him. Attorney General Douglas Gansler and State Delegate Heather Mizeur sought the Democratic nomination as well.

On the Republican side, candidates had included Harford County Executive David R. Craig, Chairman of Change Maryland and former Maryland Secretary of Appointments Larry Hogan, Delegate Ron George, former Charles County Republican Central Committee chairman Charles Lollar, and 2012 U.S. Senate candidate Brian Vaeth.

On June 24, Brown and Hogan won their respective primaries. On November 4, Hogan was elected as governor.

Maryland general election
Party	Candidate	Votes	%
Republican	Larry Hogan	884,400	51.03
Democratic	Anthony Brown	818,890	47.25
Libertarian	Shawn Quinn	25,382	1.46
Write-in		4,505	0.26
Total votes		1,733,177	100.00
Republican gain from Democratic			

== Massachusetts ==
2014 Massachusetts gubernatorial election
- November 4, 2014
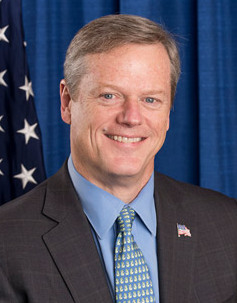

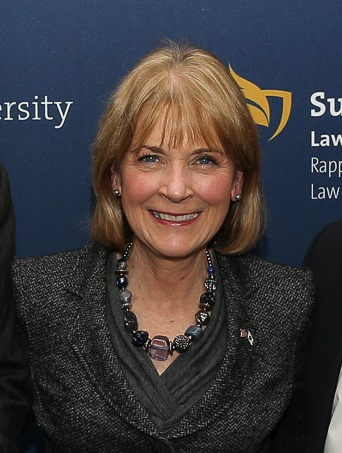
Nominee	Charlie Baker	Martha Coakley
Party	Republican	Democratic
Running mate	Karyn Polito	Steve Kerrigan
Popular vote	1,044,573	1,004,408
Percentage	48.4%	46.5%
- County results
Governor before election
Deval Patrick
Democratic
Elected Governor
Charlie Baker
Republican

Governor Deval Patrick was eligible to run for re-election, but decided not to seek a third term.

State senator and Cape Air CEO Dan Wolf was running for the Democratic nomination, but withdrew after the Ethics Commission ruled his co-ownership of Cape Air violated state conflict of interest rules.

Democratic candidates included PAREXEL executive Joseph Avellone, former Administrator of the Centers for Medicare and Medicaid Services Donald Berwick, Attorney General Martha Coakley, Treasurer Steve Grossman, and former Assistant Secretary for Intergovernmental Affairs Juliette Kayyem. Coakley won the nomination.

Republican candidates included former Massachusetts cabinet official and 2010 nominee Charlie Baker, and TEA Party member and Shrewsbury small businessman Mark Fisher. Baker won the nomination.

Baker won the election.

Massachusetts general election
Party	Candidate	Votes	%
Republican	Charlie Baker	1,044,573	48.39
Democratic	Martha Coakley	1,004,408	46.54
United Independent	Evan Falchuk	71,814	3.33
Independent	Scott Lively	19,378	0.90
Independent	Jeff McCormick	16,295	0.75
Write-in		1,858	0.09
Total votes		2,158,326	100.00
Republican gain from Democratic			

== Michigan ==
2014 Michigan gubernatorial election
- November 4, 2014
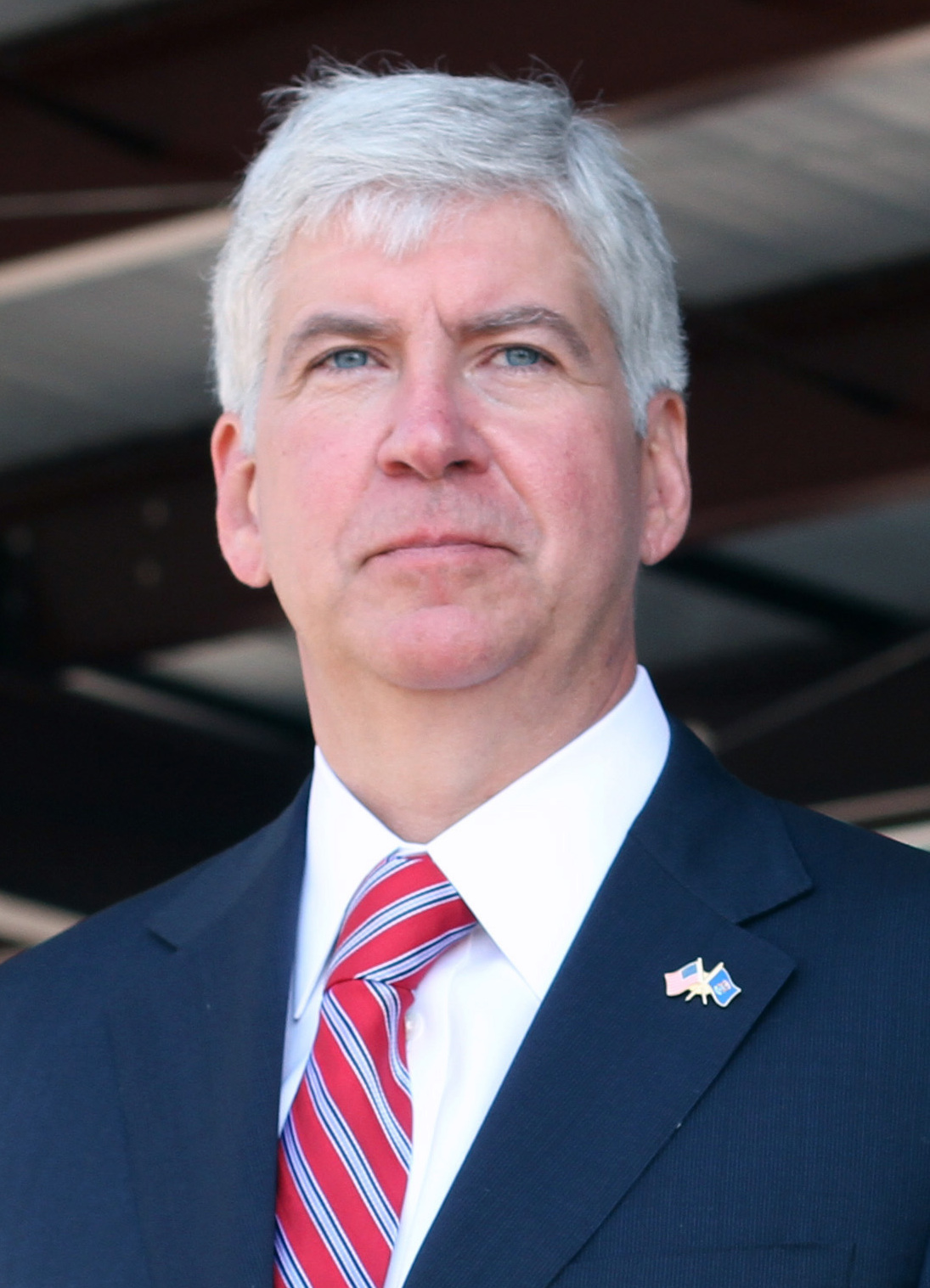

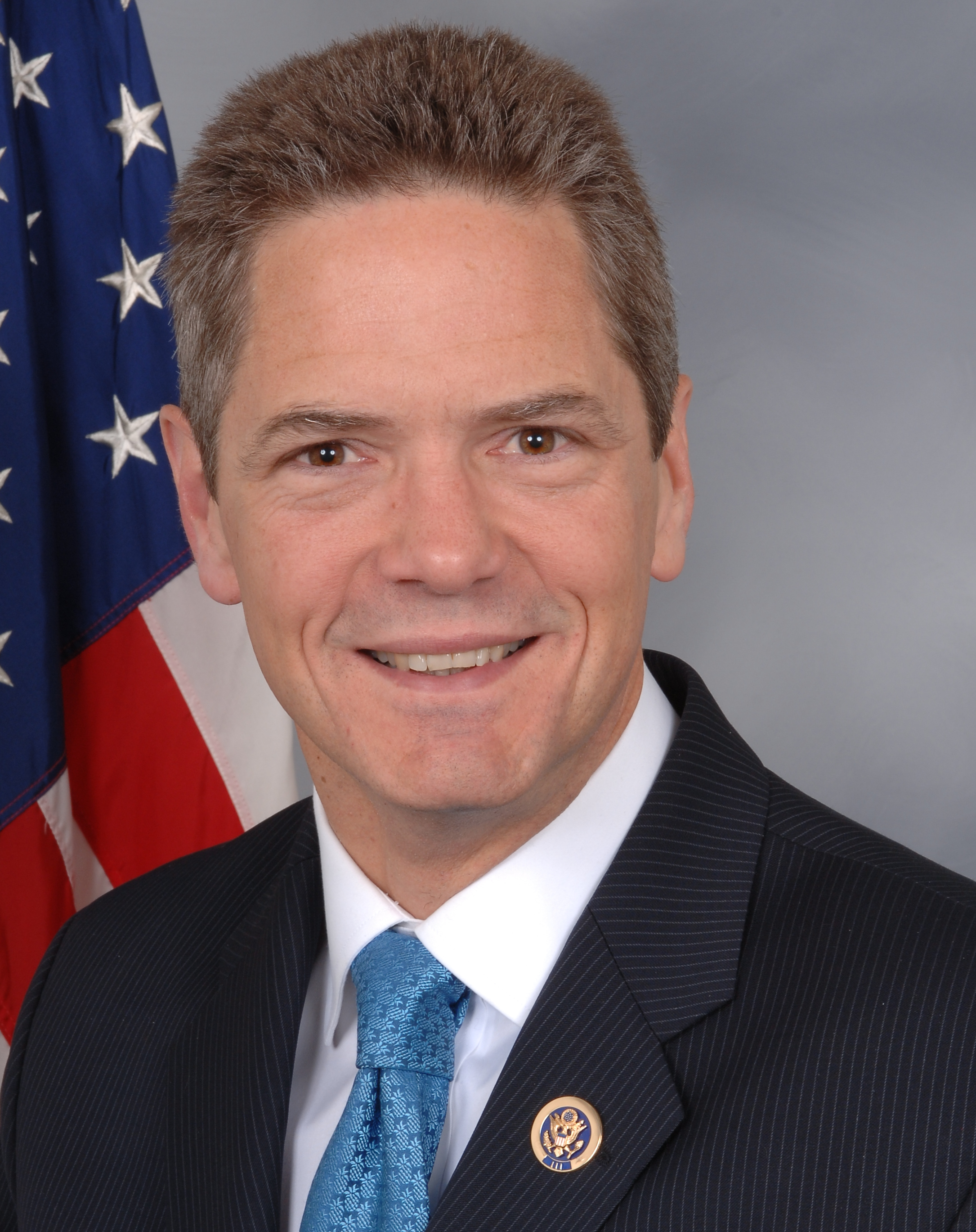
Nominee	Rick Snyder	Mark Schauer
Party	Republican	Democratic
Running mate	Brian Calley	Lisa Brown
Popular vote	1,605,034	1,476,904
Percentage	50.9%	46.9%
- County results
Governor before election
Rick Snyder
Republican
Elected Governor
Rick Snyder
Republican

Governor Rick Snyder sought re-election to a second term and was unopposed in the August 5 party primary. Snyder was elected with 58.1% of the vote in 2010.

Former representative Mark Schauer was unopposed for the Democratic nomination.

Snyder won re-election to a second term.

Michigan general election
Party	Candidate	Votes	%
Republican	Rick Snyder (incumbent)	1,607,399	50.92
Democratic	Mark Schauer	1,479,057	46.86
Libertarian	Mary Buzuma	35,723	1.13
U.S. Taxpayers'	Mark McFarlin	19,368	0.61
Green	Paul Homeniuk	14,934	0.47
Write-in		50	0.00
Total votes		3,156,531	100.00
Republican hold			

== Minnesota ==
2014 Minnesota gubernatorial election
- November 4, 2014
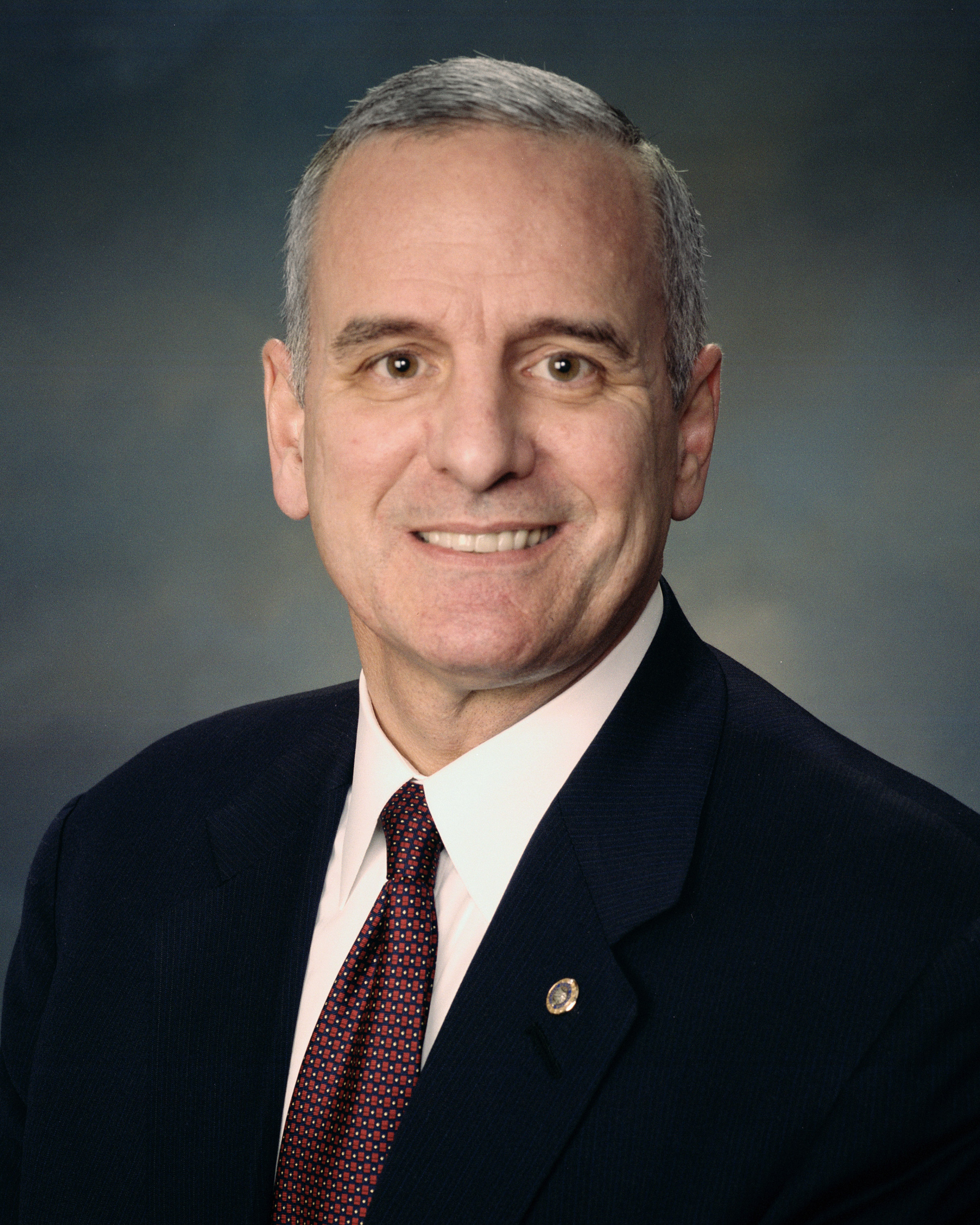

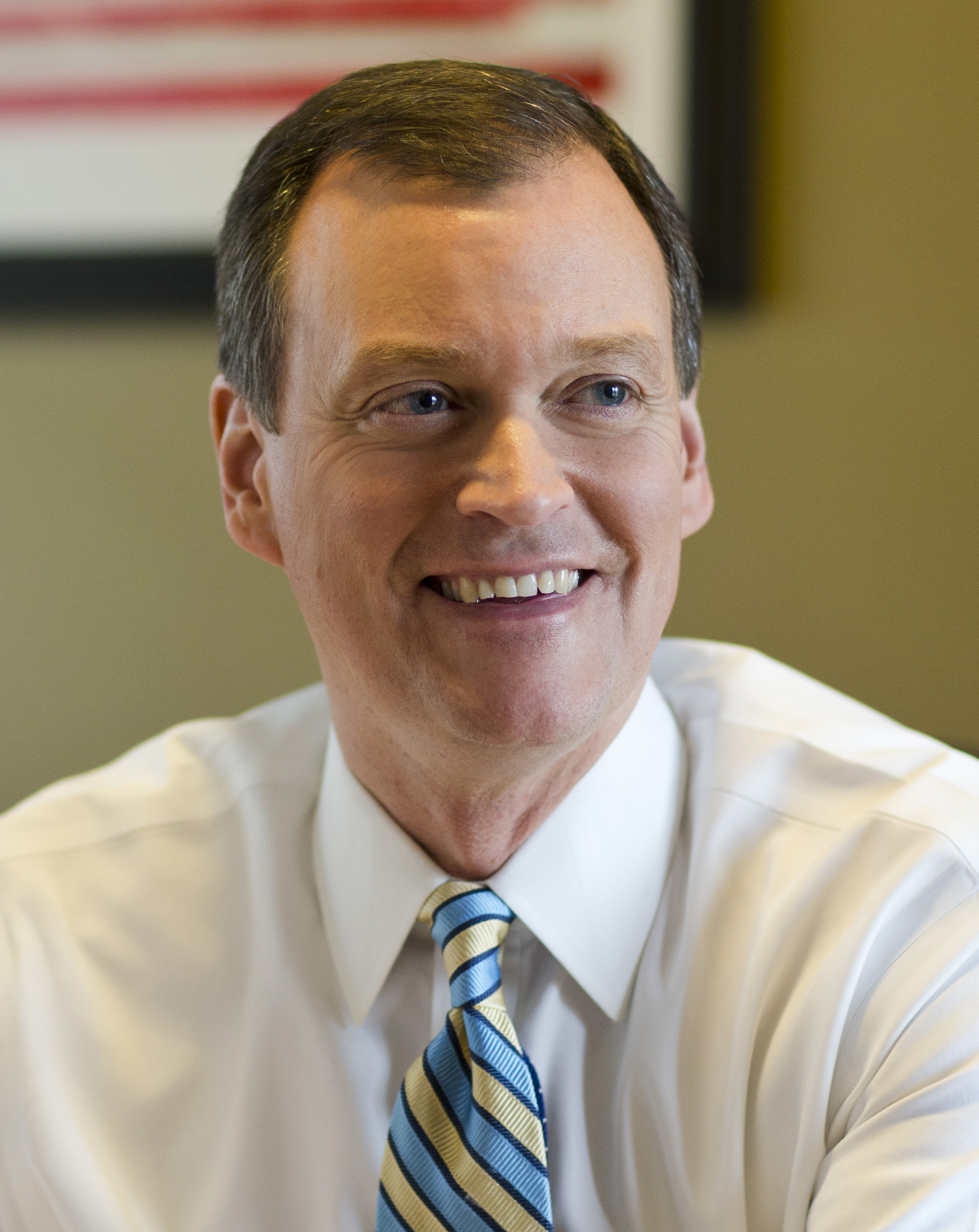
Nominee	Mark Dayton	Jeff Johnson
Party	Democratic (DFL)	Republican
Running mate	Tina Smith	Bill Kuisle
Popular vote	989,113	879,257
Percentage	50.1%	44.5%
- County results
Governor before election
Mark Dayton
Democratic (DFL)
Elected Governor
Mark Dayton
Democratic (DFL)

Governor Mark Dayton sought re-election. Dayton was elected with 43.7% of the vote in 2010. Teacher Rob Farnsworth, investment banker Scott Honour, Hennepin County commissioner and former state representative Jeff Johnson, perennial candidate Ole Savior, former Minority Leader of the Minnesota House of Representatives and candidate for governor in 2010 Marty Seifert, state senator and former radio host Dave Thompson, and state representative and former Speaker of the Minnesota House of Representatives Kurt Zellers sought the Republican nomination. Activist Leslie Davis sought the DFL nomination.

Minnesota general election
Party	Candidate	Votes	%
Democratic (DFL)	Mark Dayton (incumbent)	989,113	50.07
Republican	Jeff Johnson	879,257	44.51
Independence	Hannah Nicollet	56,900	2.88
Grassroots	Chris Wright	31,259	1.58
Libertarian	Chris Holbrook	18,082	0.92
Write-in		795	0.04
Total votes		1,975,406	100.00
Democratic (DFL) hold			

== Nebraska ==
2014 Nebraska gubernatorial election
- November 4, 2014
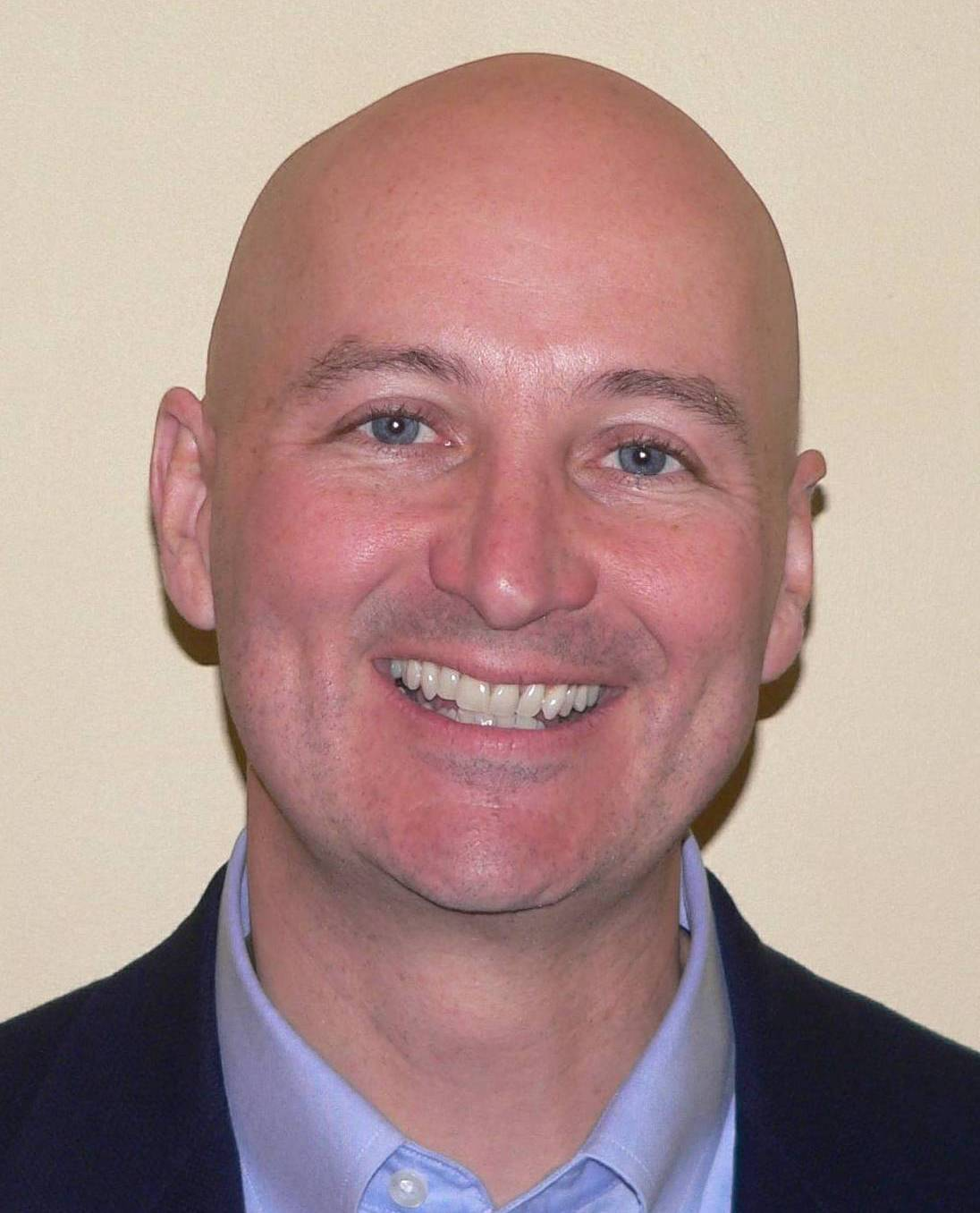

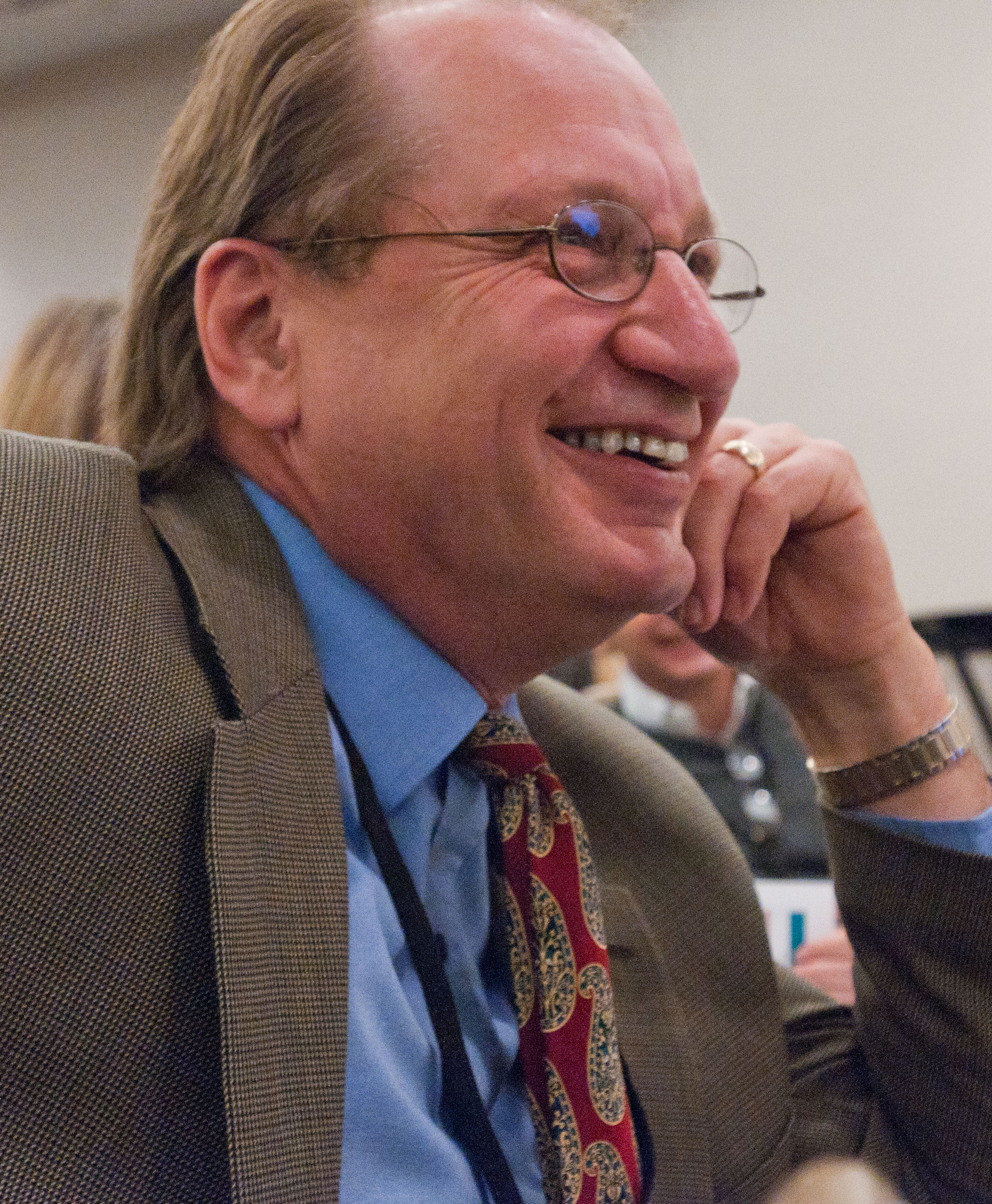
Nominee	Pete Ricketts	Chuck Hassebrook
Party	Republican	Democratic
Running mate	Mike Foley	Jane Raybould
Popular vote	308,751	211,905
Percentage	57.2%	39.2%
- County results
Governor before election
Dave Heineman
Republican
Elected Governor
Pete Ricketts
Republican

Governor Dave Heineman was term-limited in 2014.

Former Republican lieutenant governor Rick Sheehy had been endorsed by Heineman, but Sheehy exited the race due to a report regarding a series of inappropriate phone calls he had made to women who were not his wife. State senators Tom Carlson, Charlie Janssen, and Beau McCoy also ran for the Republican nomination. Other potential Republican candidates include Auditor of Public Accounts Mike Foley and businessman Pete Ricketts. The nomination was won by Ricketts.

Executive director of the Center for Rural Affairs Chuck Hassebrook ran for the Democratic nomination. State Senator Annette Dubas was also running, but she has withdrawn, leaving Hassebrook the only Democratic candidate. Hassebrook won the nomination.

Ricketts won the election.

Nebraska general election
Party	Candidate	Votes	%
Republican	Pete Ricketts	308,751	57.15
Democratic	Chuck Hassebrook	211,905	39.23
Libertarian	Mark Elworth	19,001	3.52
Write-in		545	0.10
Total votes		540,202	100.00
Republican hold			

== Nevada ==
2014 Nevada gubernatorial election
- November 4, 2014
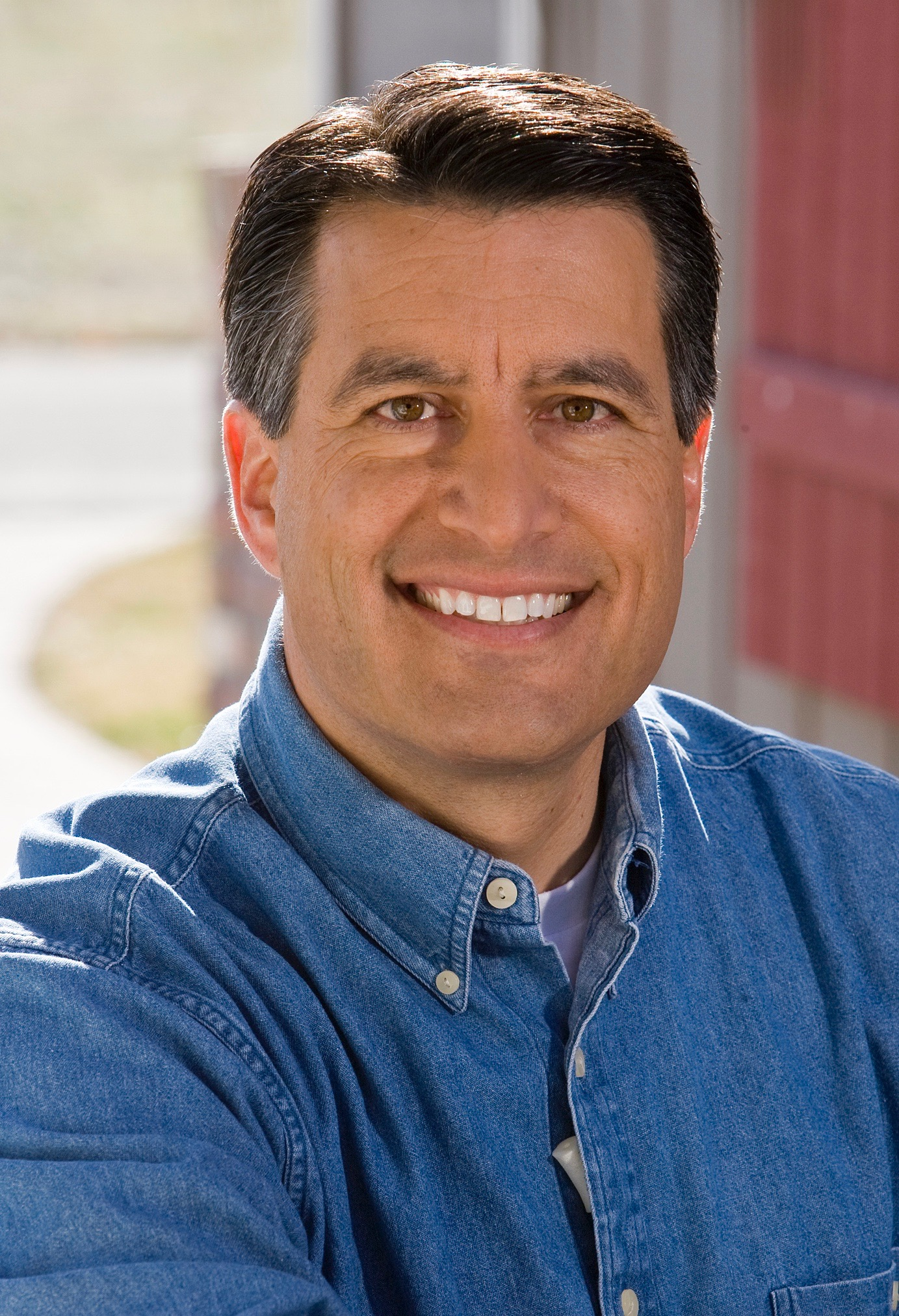

Nominee	Brian Sandoval	Bob Goodman
Party	Republican	Democratic
Popular vote	386,340	130,722
Percentage	70.6%	23.9%
- County results
Governor before election
Brian Sandoval
Republican
Elected Governor
Brian Sandoval
Republican

Governor Brian Sandoval sought a second term. Sandoval was elected with 53.4% of the vote in 2010.

Anthropology Professor Frederick "Fred" Conquest and Businessman Chris Hyepock ran for the Democratic nomination. Bob Goodman, won the nomination.

Family therapist David Lory VanDerBeek successfully sought the Independent American nomination.

Sandoval won re-election to a second term.

Nevada general election
Party	Candidate	Votes	%
Republican	Brian Sandoval (incumbent)	386,340	70.58
Democratic	Bob Goodman	130,722	23.88
	None of These Candidates	15,751	2.88
Independent American	David Lory VanDerBeek	14,536	2.66
Total votes		547,349	100.00
Republican hold			

== New Hampshire ==
2014 New Hampshire gubernatorial election
- November 4, 2014
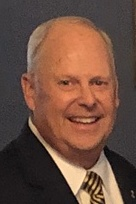
Nominee	Maggie Hassan	Walt Havenstein
Party	Democratic	Republican
Popular vote	254,666	229,610
Percentage	52.4%	47.4%
Governor before election
Maggie Hassan
Democratic
Elected Governor
Maggie Hassan
Democratic

Governor Maggie Hassan, elected in 2012 sought re-election. New Hampshire's governors serve two-year terms.

Former U.S. representative Frank Guinta had not ruled out the possibility of running for the Republican nomination.

New Hampshire general election
Party	Candidate	Votes	%
Democratic	Maggie Hassan (incumbent)	254,666	52.38
Republican	Walt Havenstein	230,610	47.43
Write-in		907	0.19
Total votes		486,183	100.00
Democratic hold			

== New Mexico ==
2014 New Mexico gubernatorial election
- November 4, 2014
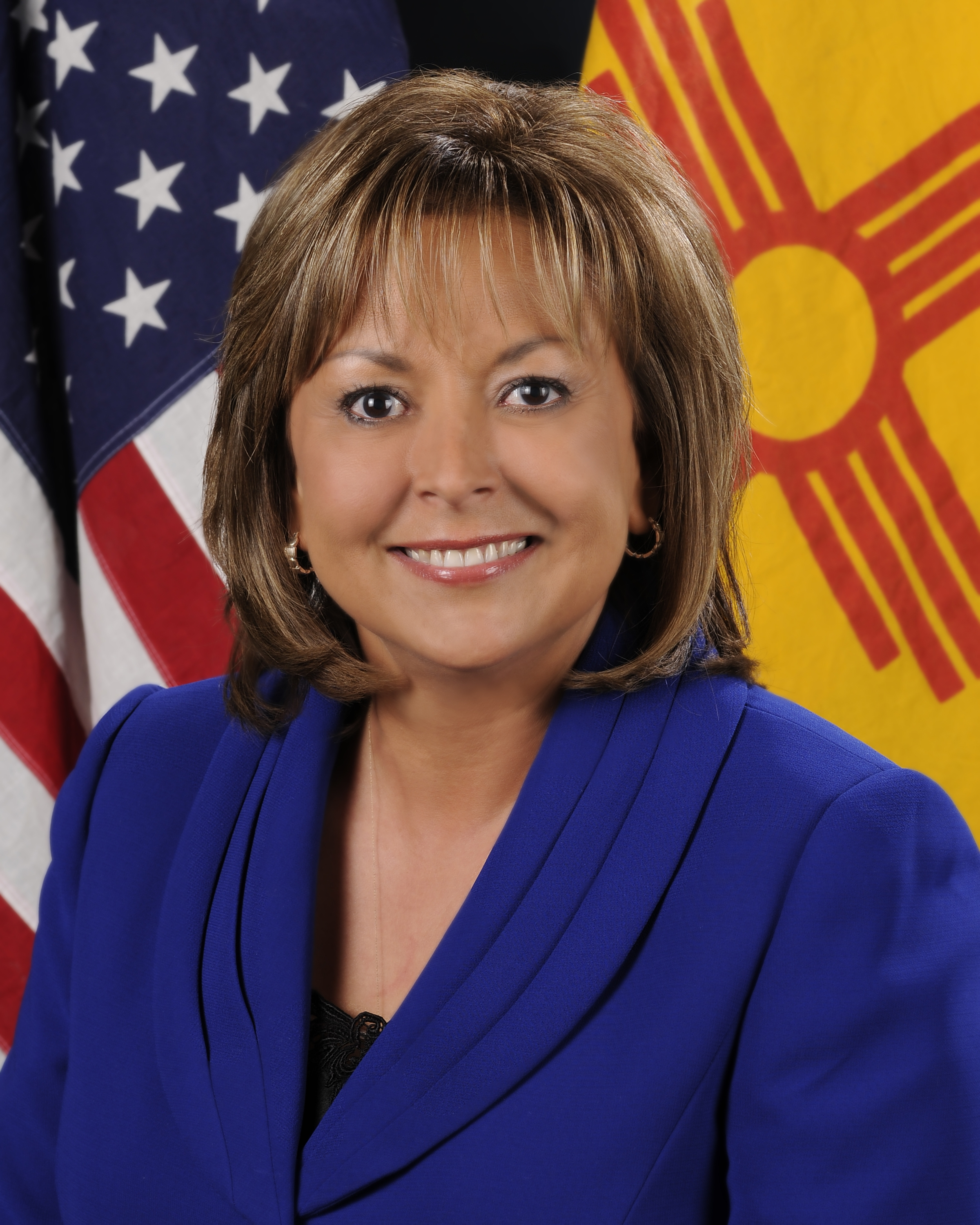

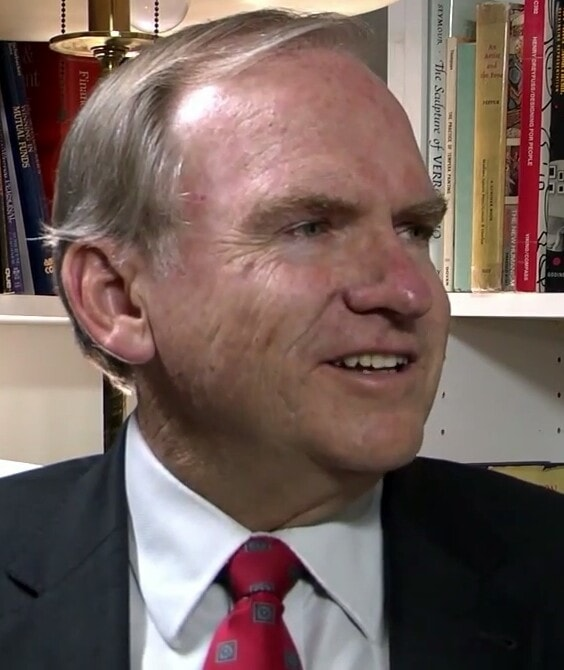
Nominee	Susana Martínez	Gary King
Party	Republican	Democratic
Running mate	John Sanchez	Deb Haaland
Popular vote	293,443	219,362
Percentage	57.2%	42.8%
- County results
Governor before election
Susana Martínez
Republican
Elected Governor
Susana Martínez
Republican

Governor Susana Martinez sought a second term. Martinez was elected with 53.6% of the vote in 2010.

State Attorney General Gary King, the son of former governor Bruce King Businessman Alan Webber, former New Mexico Director of the Farm Service Agency Lawrence Rael, and state senators Howie Morales and Linda Lopez sought the Democratic nomination. King won.

Martinez won re-election to a second term.

New Mexico general election
Party	Candidate	Votes	%
Republican	Susana Martinez (incumbent)	293,443	57.22
Democratic	Gary King	219,362	42.78
Total votes		512,805	100.00
Republican hold			

== New York ==
2014 New York gubernatorial election
- November 4, 2014
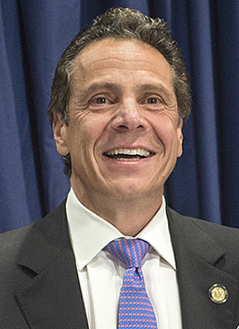

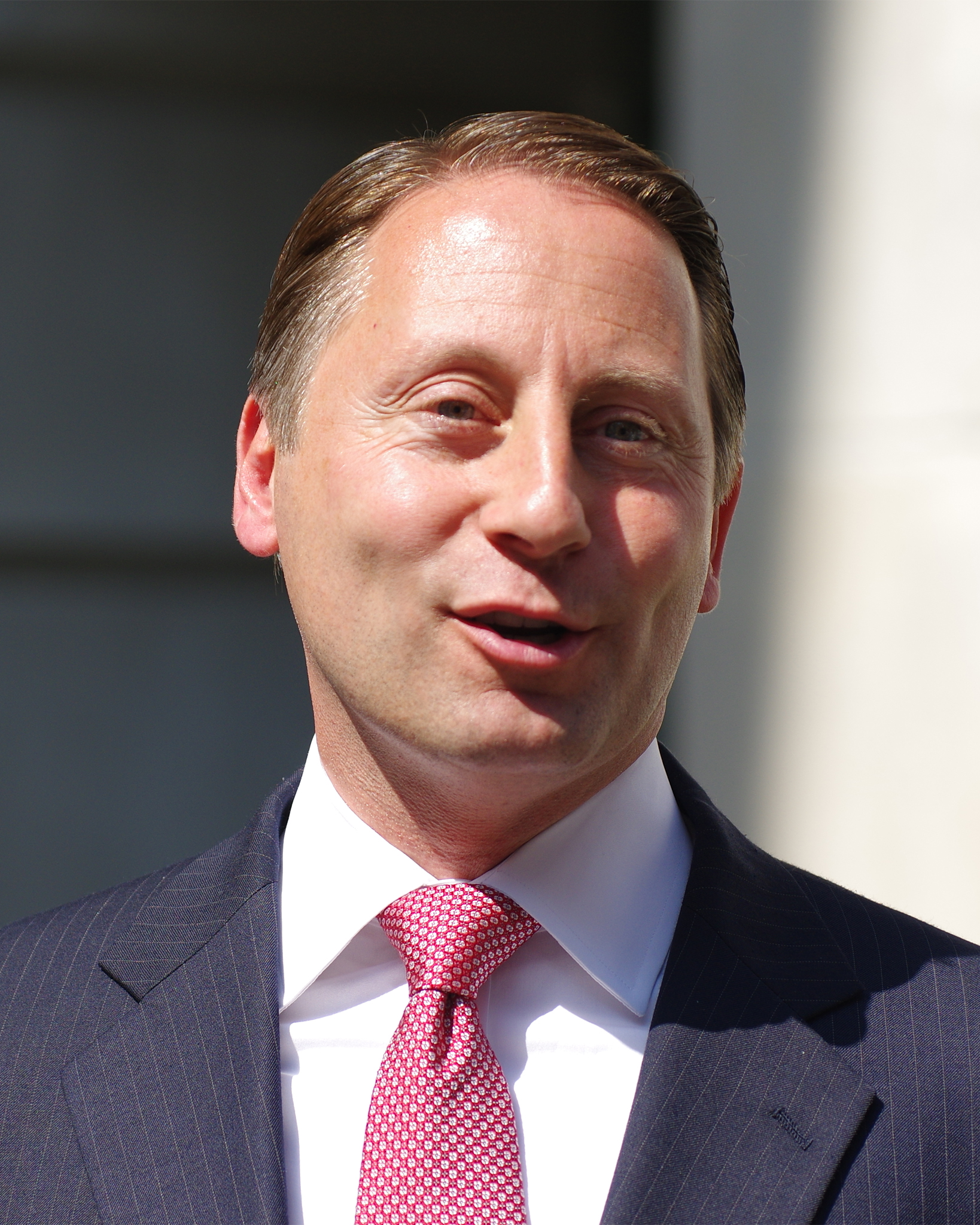
Nominee	Andrew Cuomo	Rob Astorino
Party	Democratic	Republican
Alliance	Parties: Independence; Women's Equality; Working Families	Parties: Conservative; Stop Common Core
Running mate	Kathy Hochul	Christopher Moss
Popular vote	2,069,480	1,536,879
Percentage	54.19%	40.24%
- County results
Governor before election
Andrew Cuomo
Democratic
Elected Governor
Andrew Cuomo
Democratic

Governor Andrew Cuomo sought re-election. Cuomo was elected with 62.6% of the vote in 2010 over Carl Paladino. Paladino might seek a rematch. Other potential Republican candidates are Westchester County Executive Rob Astorino, businessman Donald Trump, State Assemblyman Steven McLaughlin, Dutchess County Executive Marcus Molinaro and Harry Wilson, the nominee for State Comptroller in 2010.

New York general election
Party	Candidate	Votes	%
Democratic	Andrew Cuomo	1,811,672	47.44%
Working Families	Andrew Cuomo	126,244	3.31%
Independence	Andrew Cuomo	77,762	2.04%
Women's Equality	Andrew Cuomo	53,802	1.41%
Total	Andrew Cuomo (incumbent)	2,069,480	54.19%
Republican	Rob Astorino	1,234,951	32.34%
Conservative	Rob Astorino	250,634	6.56%
Stop Common Core	Rob Astorino	51,492	1.35%
Total	Rob Astorino	1,536,879	40.24%
Green	Howie Hawkins	184,419	4.83%
Libertarian	Michael McDermott	16,769	0.44%
Sapient	Steven Cohn	4,963	0.13%
Write ins	Write ins	6,378	0.17%
Total votes		3,819,086	100.00%
Democratic hold			

== Ohio ==
2014 Ohio gubernatorial election
- November 4, 2014
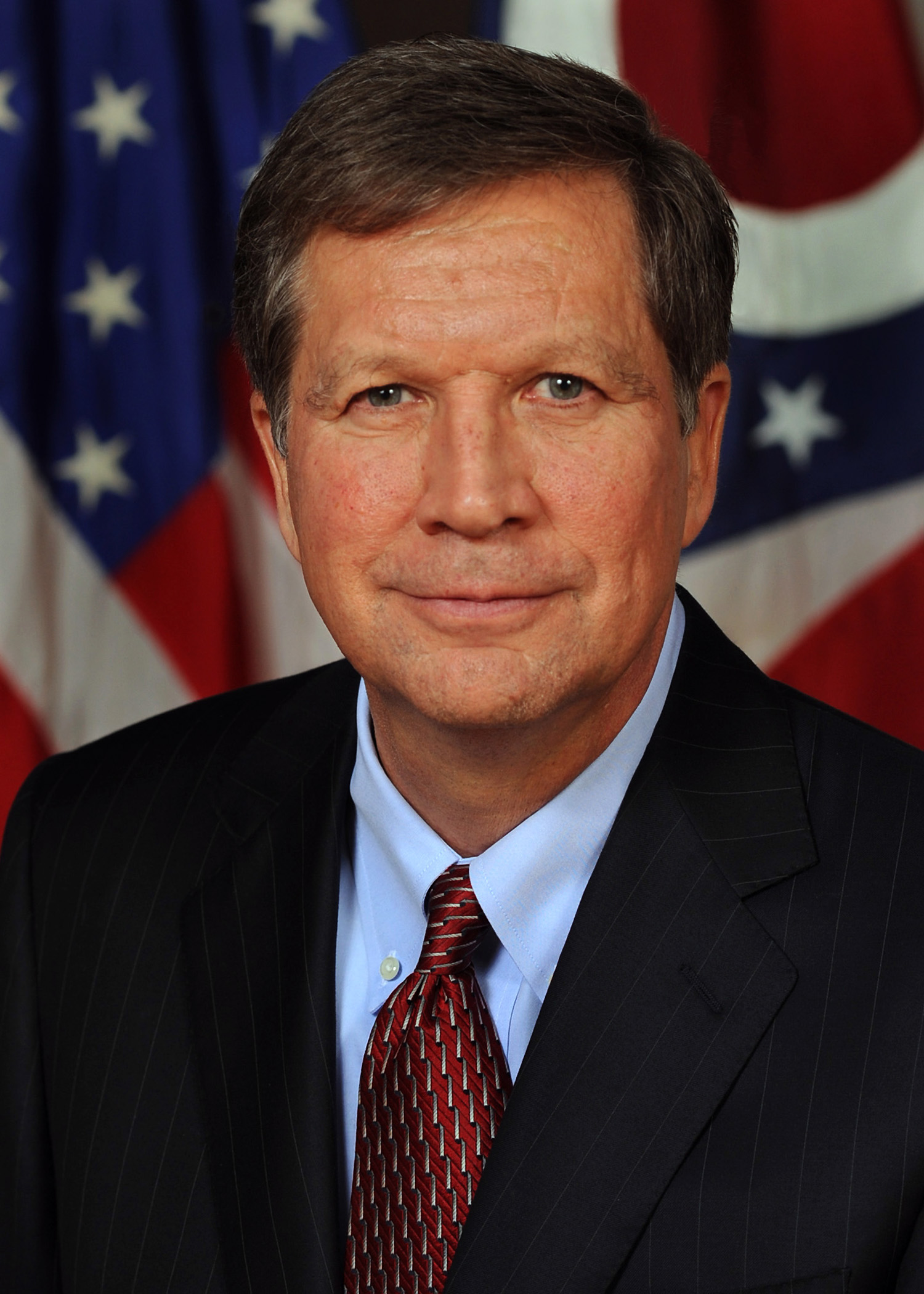

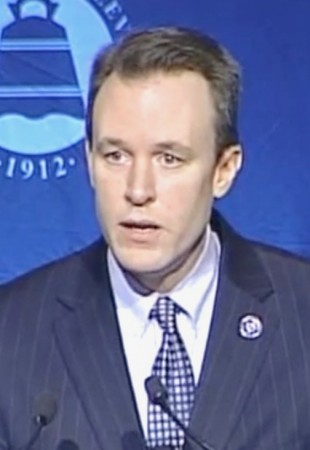
Nominee	John Kasich	Ed FitzGerald
Party	Republican	Democratic
Running mate	Mary Taylor	Sharen Neuhardt
Popular vote	1,944,848	1,009,359
Percentage	63.6%	33.0%
- County results
Governor before election
John Kasich
Republican
Elected Governor
John Kasich
Republican

Governor John Kasich sought a second term. Kasich was elected with 49.4% of the vote in 2010.

Cuyahoga County Executive Ed FitzGerald and Hamilton County commissioner Todd Portune are running for the Democratic nomination.

Former Ohio state representative Charlie Earl is running for the Libertarian nomination.

Kasich won re-election to a second term.

Ohio general election
Party	Candidate	Votes	%
Republican	John Kasich (incumbent)	1,944,848	63.64
Democratic	Ed FitzGerald	1,009,359	33.03
Green	Anita Rios	101,706	3.33
Total votes		3,055,913	100.00
Republican hold			

== Oklahoma ==
2014 Oklahoma gubernatorial election
- November 4, 2014
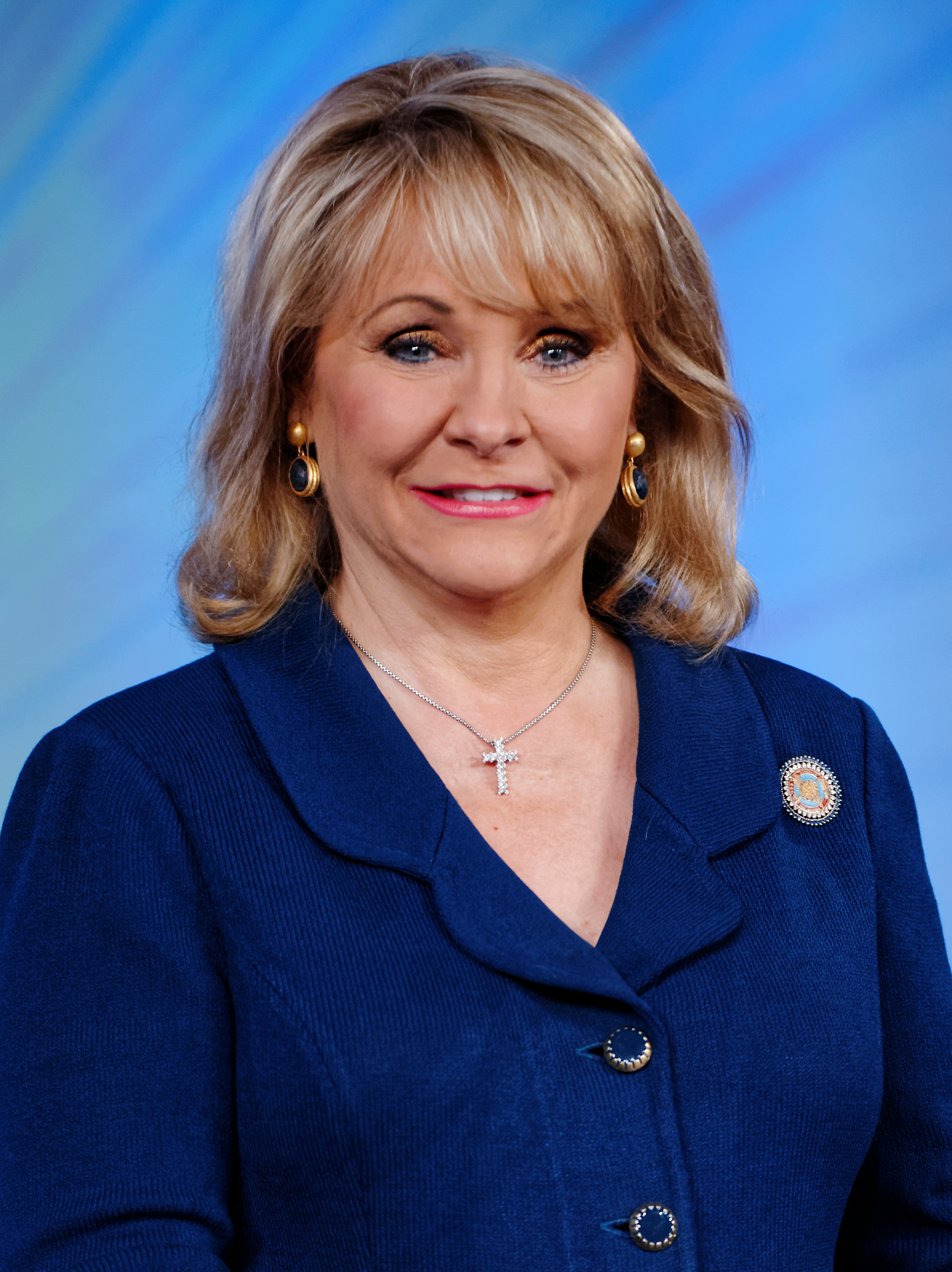

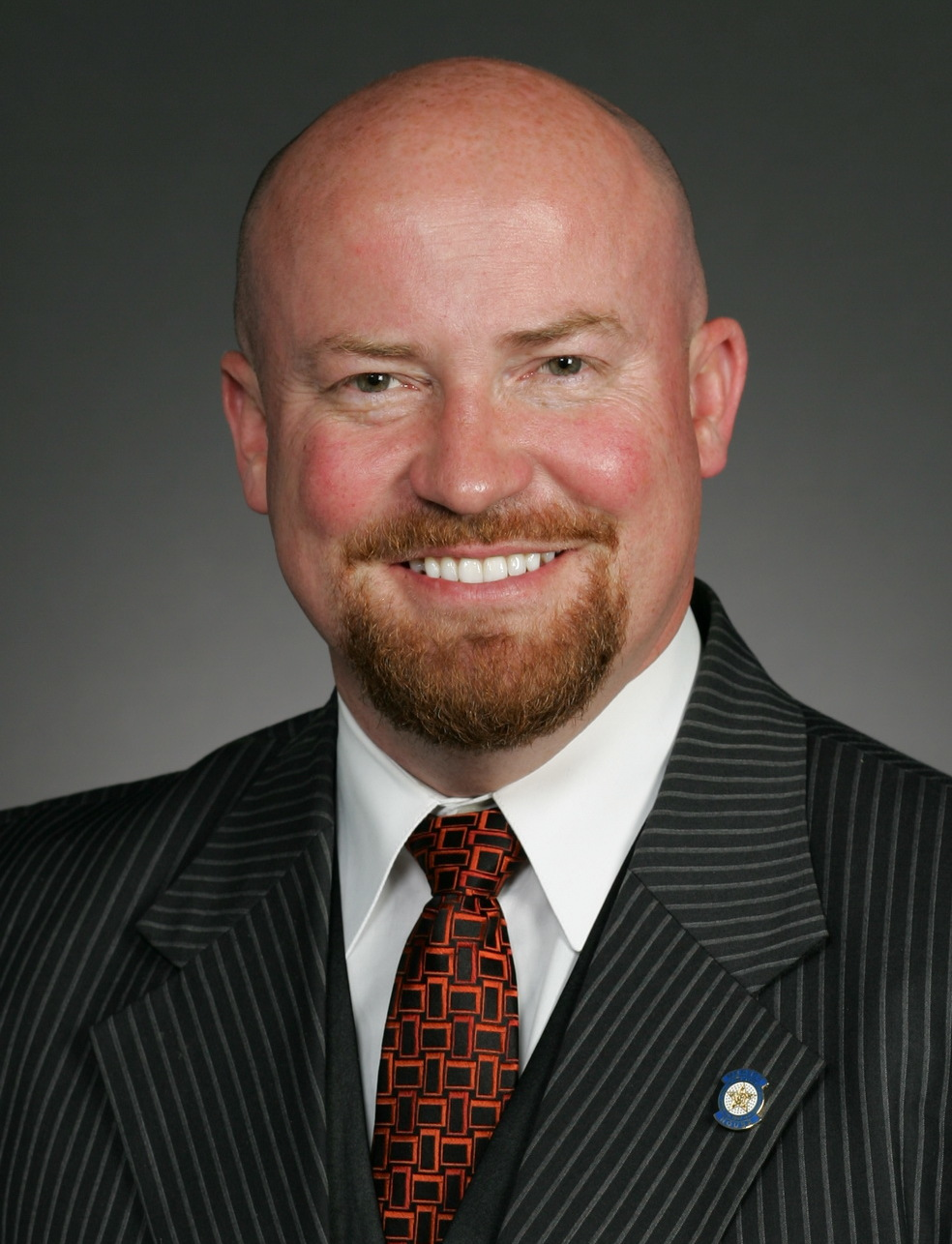
Nominee	Mary Fallin	Joe Dorman
Party	Republican	Democratic
Popular vote	460,298	338,239
Percentage	55.8%	41.0%
- County results
Governor before election
Mary Fallin
Republican
Elected Governor
Mary Fallin
Republican

Governor Mary Fallin sought a second term. Fallin was elected with 60.1% of the vote in 2010.

2010 Republican Party Gubernatorial candidate Randy Brogdon ran again.

State Representative Joe Dorman is the only Democratic candidate who ran.

Fallin won re-election to a second term.

Oklahoma general election
Party	Candidate	Votes	%
Republican	Mary Fallin (incumbent)	460,298	55.80
Democratic	Joe Dorman	338,239	41.01
Independent	Kimberly Willis	17,169	2.08
Independent	Richard Prawdzienski	9,125	1.11
Total votes		824,831	100.00
Republican hold			

== Oregon ==
2014 Oregon gubernatorial election
- November 4, 2014
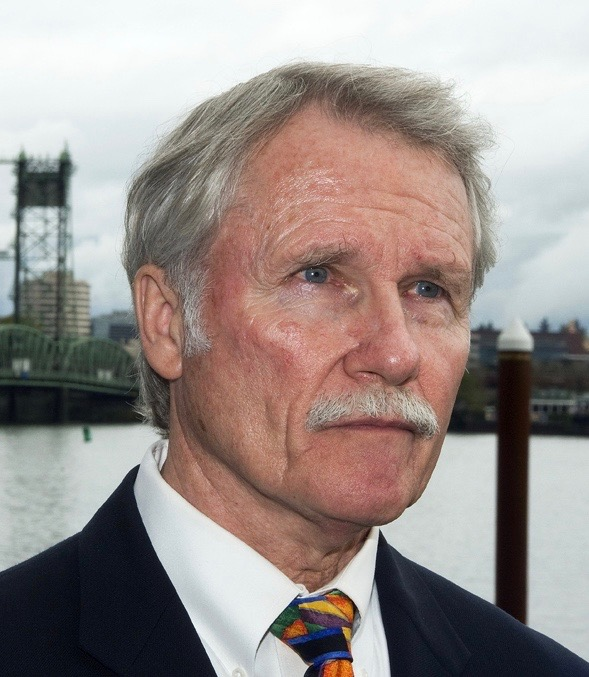

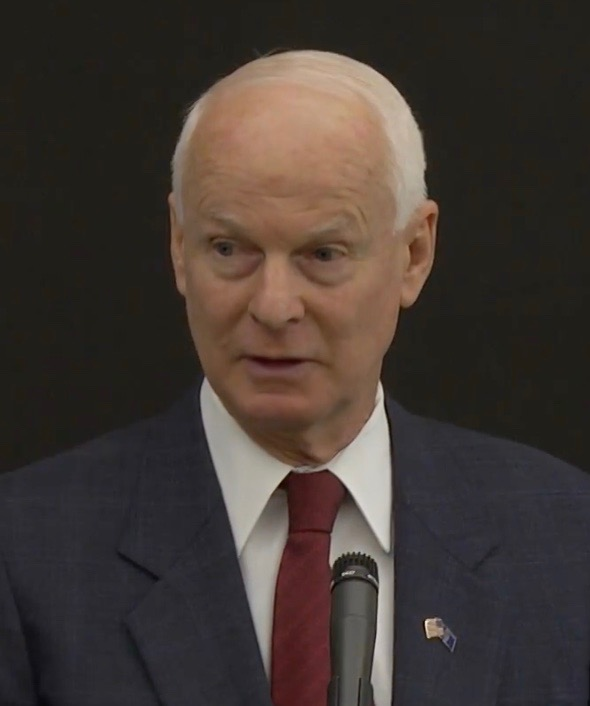
Nominee	John Kitzhaber	Dennis Richardson
Party	Democratic	Republican
Alliance	Working Families	Independent Party
Popular vote	733,230	648,542
Percentage	49.9%	44.1%
- County results
Governor before election
John Kitzhaber
Democratic
Elected Governor
John Kitzhaber
Democratic

Governor John Kitzhaber sought re-election. Kitzhaber was elected with 49.2% of the vote in 2010. Kitzhaber won the election.

Oregon general election
Party	Candidate	Votes	%
Democratic	John Kitzhaber (incumbent)	733,230	49.89
Republican	Dennis Richardson	648,542	44.13
Pacific Green	Jason Levin	29,561	2.01
Libertarian	Paul Grad	21,903	1.49
Constitution	Aaron Auer	15,929	1.08
Progressive	Chris Henry	13,898	0.95
Write-in		6,654	0.45
Total votes		1,469,717	100.00
Democratic hold			

== Pennsylvania ==
2014 Pennsylvania gubernatorial election
- November 4, 2014
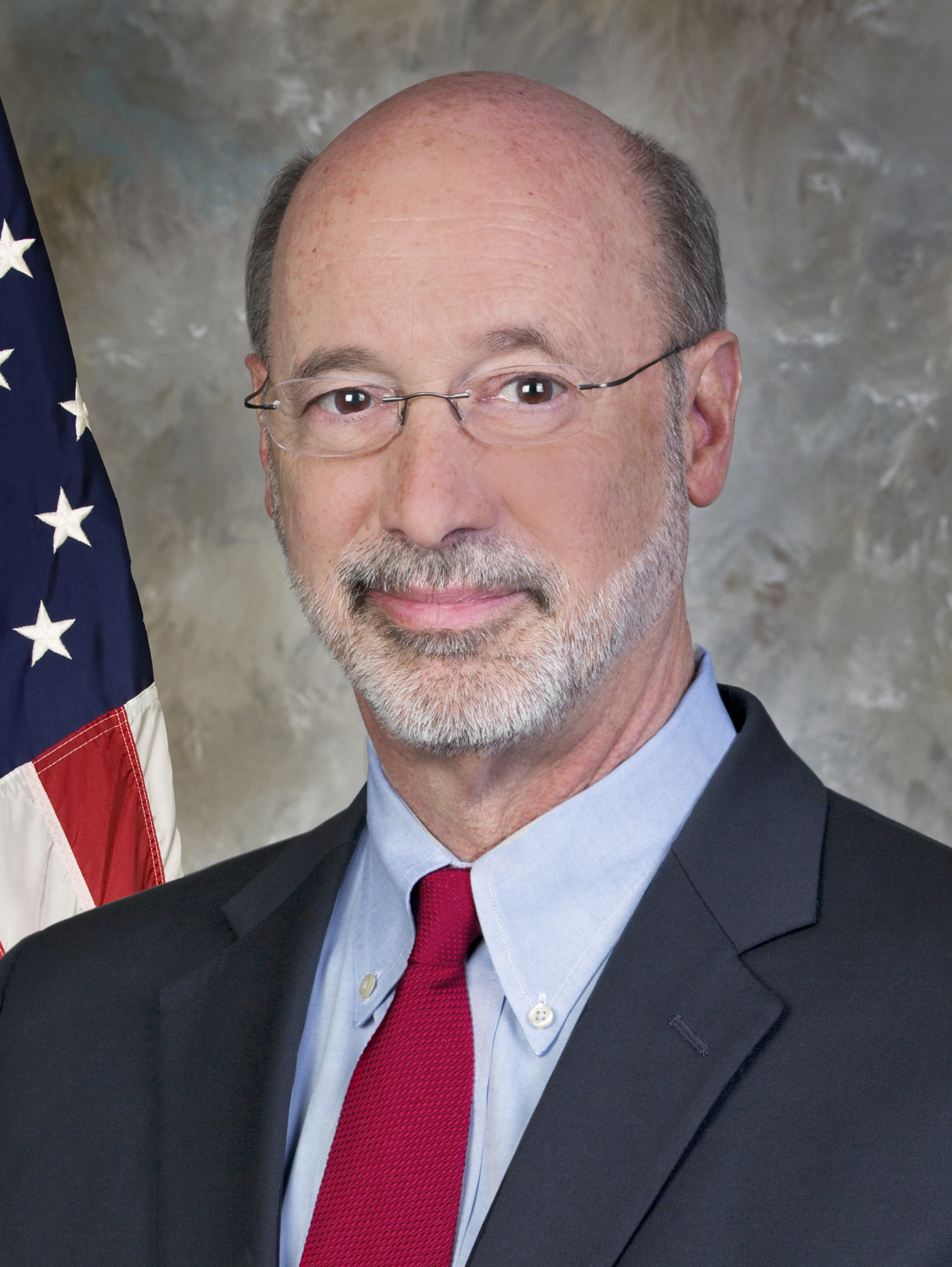

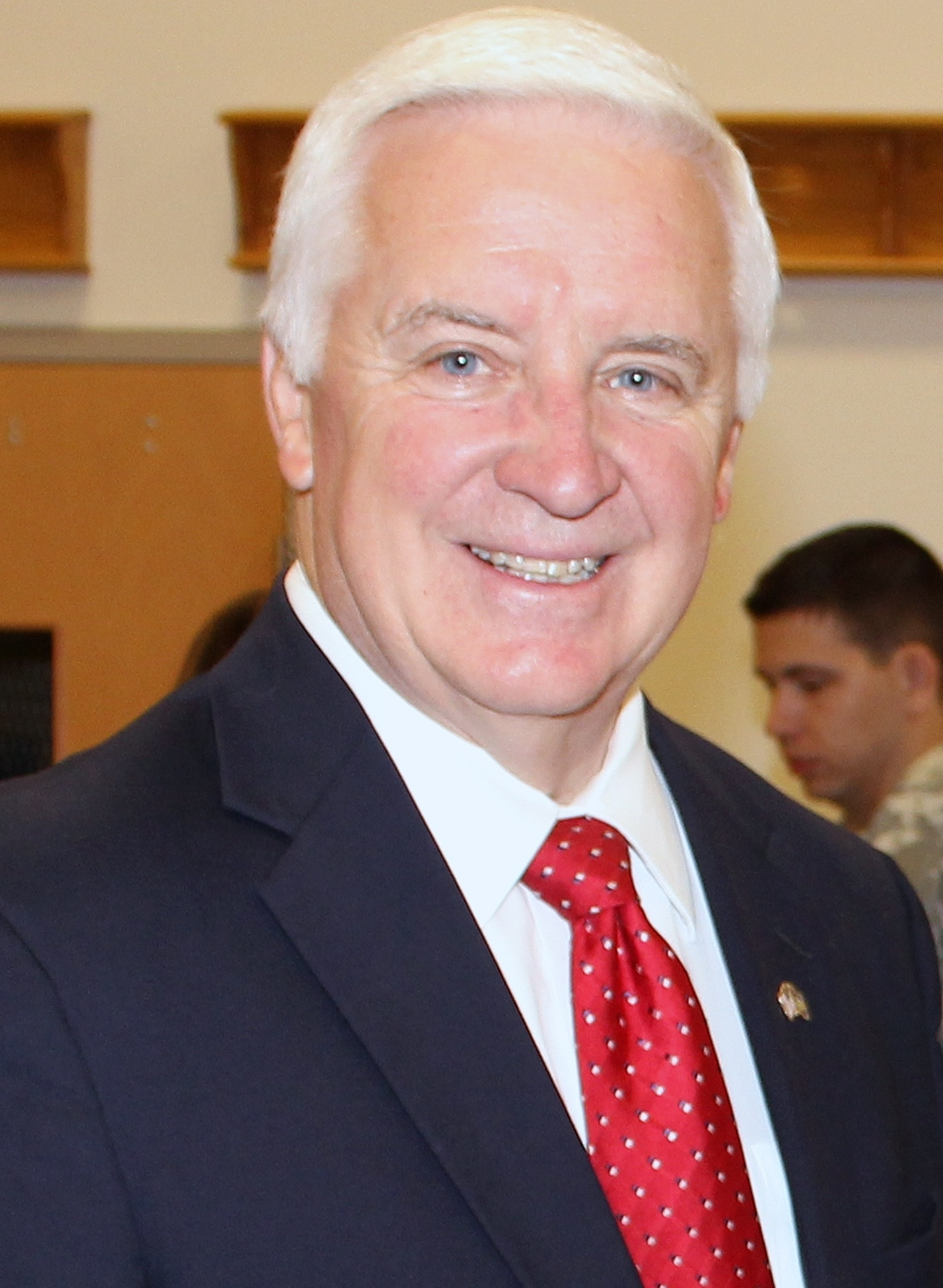
Nominee	Tom Wolf	Tom Corbett
Party	Democratic	Republican
Running mate	Mike Stack	Jim Cawley
Popular vote	1,920,355	1,575,511
Percentage	54.9%	45.1%
- County results
Governor before election
Tom Corbett
Republican
Elected Governor
Tom Wolf
Democratic

Incumbent Republican governor Tom Corbett ran for re-election to a second term but was defeated by the Democratic nominee, Tom Wolf. This marked the first time an incumbent governor running for re-election in Pennsylvania lost.

Democrat Tom Wolf won his party's primary on May 20, 2014, defeating Congresswoman Allyson Schwartz, State Treasurer Rob McCord and former Pennsylvania Secretary of Environmental Protection Kathleen McGinty in a landslide victory.

Pennsylvania general election
Party	Candidate	Votes	%
Democratic	Tom Wolf	1,920,355	54.93
Republican	Tom Corbett (incumbent)	1,575,511	45.07
Total votes		3,495,866	100.00
Democratic gain from Republican			

== Rhode Island ==
2014 Rhode Island gubernatorial election
- November 4, 2014
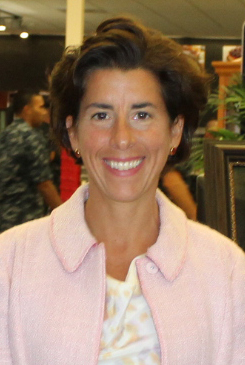

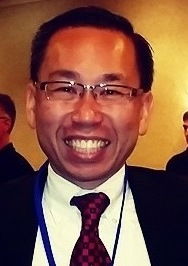

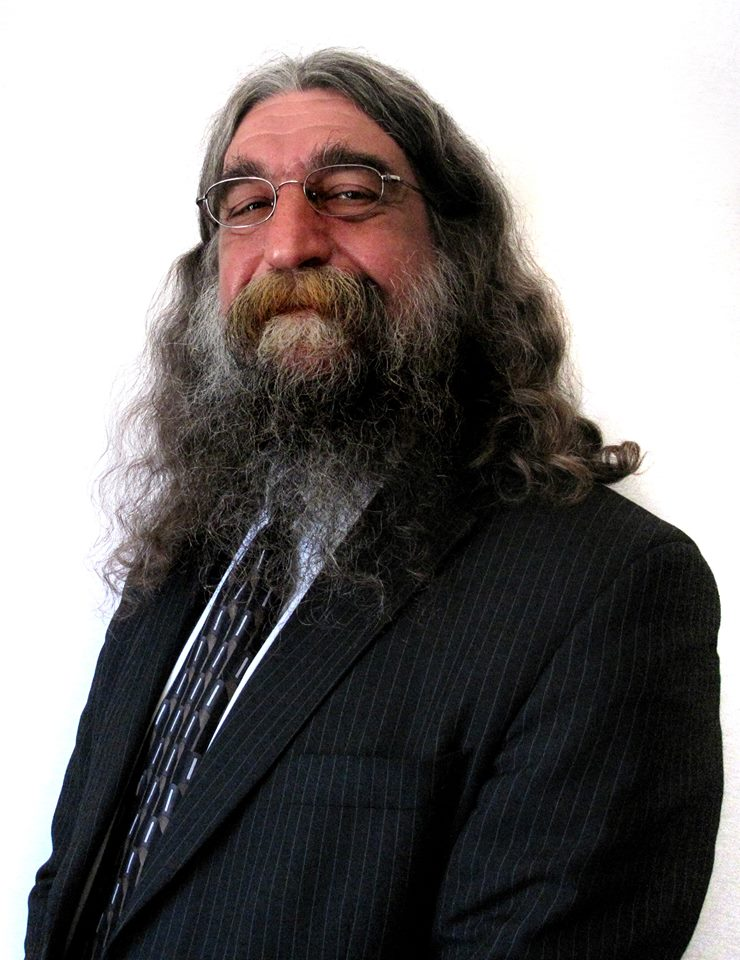
Nominee	Gina Raimondo	Allan Fung	Robert J. Healey
Party	Democratic	Republican	Moderate
Popular vote	131,899	117,428	69,278
Percentage	40.7%	36.2%	21.4%
- County results
Governor before election
Lincoln Chafee
Democratic
Elected Governor
Gina Raimondo
Democratic

Governor Lincoln Chafee retired after one term in office. Chafee was elected with 36.1% in a competitive three-way race in 2010 in which he ran as an independent. He became a Democrat in May 2013, promoting speculation he would run for a second term, but later announced that he would not run for re-election on September 4, 2013.

Providence Mayor Angel Taveras, State Treasurer Gina Raimondo, and former United States Department of Education official Clay Pell ran for the nomination. Raimondo won the primary election.

Cranston Mayor Allan Fung ran for the Republican nomination. Moderate Party Chairman Ken Block, who received 6.5% of the vote in the 2010 gubernatorial election, had filed to run again for the Moderate Party. He has since switched to run as a Republican. Fung won the nomination.

Rhode Island general election
Party	Candidate	Votes	%
Democratic	Gina Raimondo	131,899	40.70
Republican	Allan Fung	117,428	36.24
Moderate	Robert J. Healey	69,278	21.38
Independent	Kate Fletcher	3,483	1.07
Independent	Leon Kayarian	1,228	0.38
Write-in		739	0.23
Total votes		324,055	100.00
Democratic hold			

== South Carolina ==
2014 South Carolina gubernatorial election
- November 4, 2014
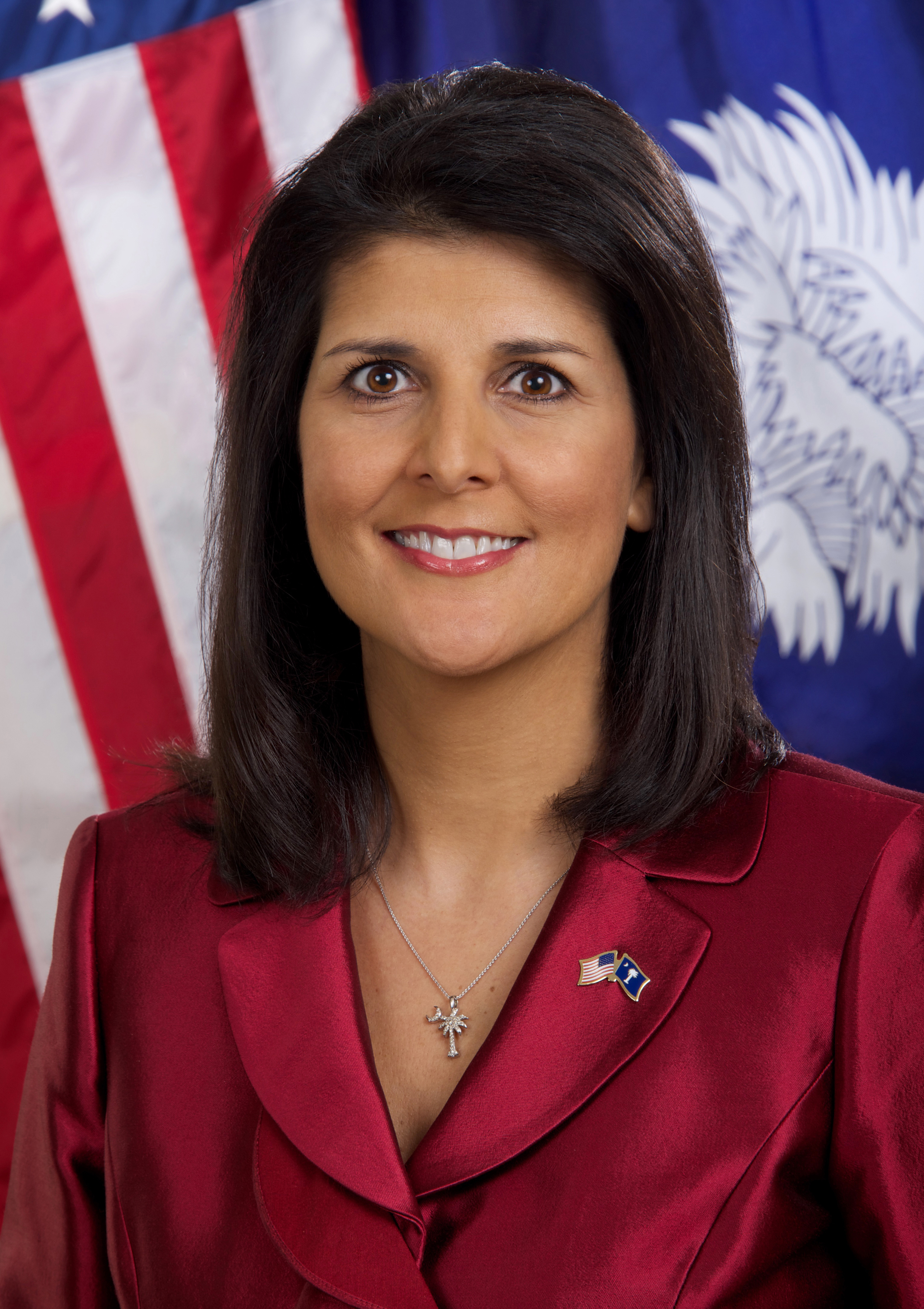

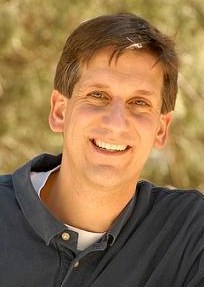
Nominee	Nikki Haley	Vincent Sheheen
Party	Republican	Democratic
Popular vote	696,645	516,166
Percentage	55.9%	41.4%
- County results
Governor before election
Nikki Haley
Republican
Elected Governor
Nikki Haley
Republican

Governor Nikki Haley sought re-election. Haley was elected with 51.4% of the vote in 2010.

Democratic 2010 gubernatorial nominee, State Senator Vincent Sheheen, sought a rematch.

On April 11, Tom Ervin announced that he was dropping out of the GOP primary.

Haley won re-election to a second term.

South Carolina general election
Party	Candidate	Votes	%
Republican	Nikki Haley (incumbent)	696,645	55.90
Democratic	Vincent Sheheen	516,166	41.42
Libertarian	Steve French	15,438	1.24
Independent	Tom Ervin	11,496	0.92
United Citizens	Morgan B. Reeves	5,622	0.45
Write-in		934	0.07
Total votes		1,246,301	100.00
Republican hold			

== South Dakota ==
2014 South Dakota gubernatorial election
- November 4, 2014
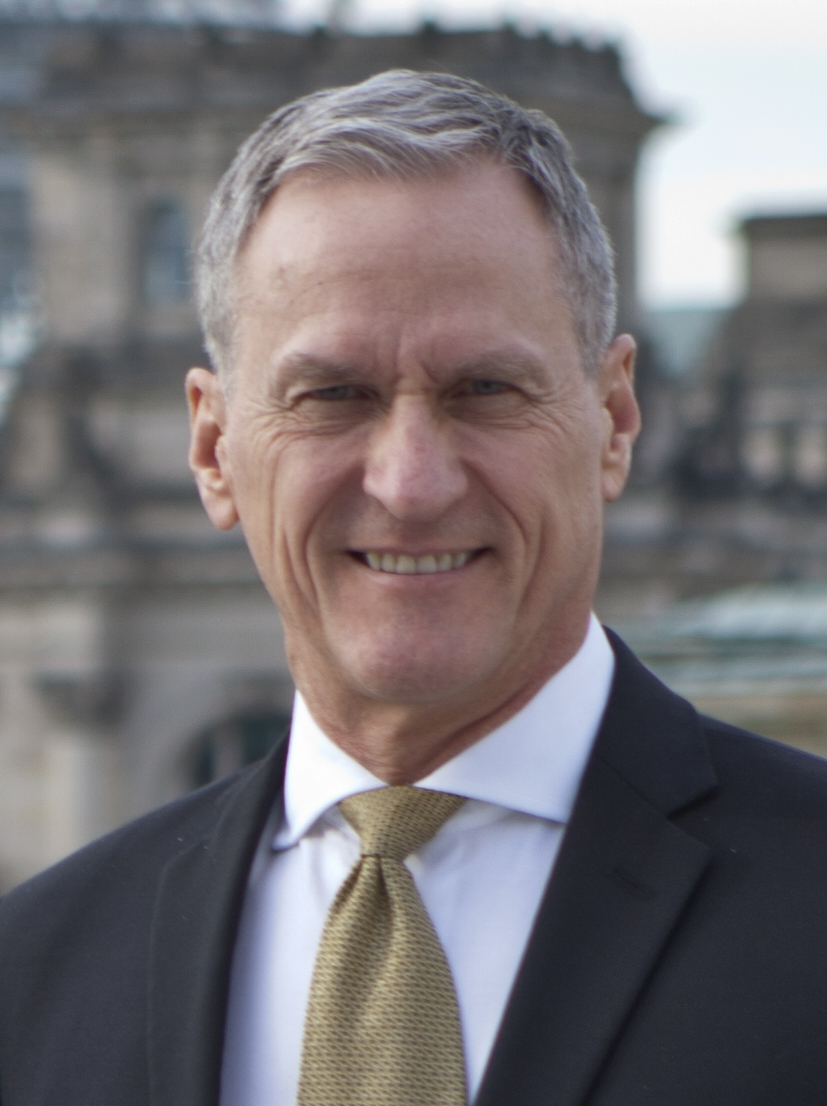

Nominee	Dennis Daugaard	Susan Wismer
Party	Republican	Democratic
Running mate	Matt Michels	Susy Blake
Popular vote	195,477	70,549
Percentage	70.5%	25.4%
- County results
Governor before election
Dennis Daugaard
Republican
Elected Governor
Dennis Daugaard
Republican

Governor Dennis Daugaard sought re-election. Daugaard was elected with 61.5% of the vote in 2010. Republican former state representative Lora Hubbel has announced a primary challenge to Daugaard.

Joe Lowe, the former director of Wildland Fire Suppression, ran for the Democratic nomination. Other speculated candidates included former commissioner of schools and public lands Bryce Healy, former congresswoman Stephanie Herseth Sandlin, and Sioux Falls Mayor Mike Huether, but they have all ruled out running for governor.

Daugaard won re-election to a second term.

South Dakota general election
Party	Candidate	Votes	%
Republican	Dennis Daugaard (incumbent)	195,477	70.47
Democratic	Susan Wismer	70,549	25.43
Independent	Michael J. Myers	11,377	4.10
Total votes		277,403	100.00
Republican hold			

== Tennessee ==
2014 Tennessee gubernatorial election
- November 4, 2014
- Turnout: 35.97% ▼5.35 pp
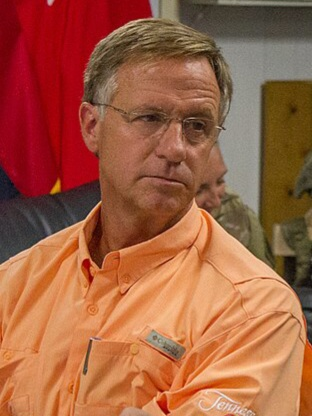

Nominee	Bill Haslam	Charles Brown
Party	Republican	Democratic
Popular vote	951,796	309,237
Percentage	70.3%	22.8%
- Haslam: 30–40% 40–50% 50–60% 60–70% 70–80% 80–90% 90% Brown: 30–40% 40–50% 50–60% 60–70% 70–80% 80–90% Tie: 50%
Governor before election
Bill Haslam
Republican
Elected Governor
Bill Haslam
Republican

Governor Bill Haslam sought re-election. Haslam was elected with 65% of the vote in 2010.

On August 7, Haslam won the Republican nomination with 87.7%. He faced Democrat Charlie Brown, Constitution Party nominee Shaun Crowell, Green Party nominee Isa Infante, and Libertarian Daniel T. Lewis. Haslam won re-election to a second term.

Tennessee general election
Party	Candidate	Votes	%
Republican	Bill Haslam (incumbent)	951,796	70.31
Democratic	Charles Brown	309,237	22.84
Independent	John Jay Hooker	30,579	2.26
Constitution	Shaun Crowell	26,580	1.96
Green	Isa Infante	18,570	1.37
Independent	Steve Coburn	8,612	0.64
Libertarian	Daniel Lewis	8,321	0.62
Write-in		33	0.00
Total votes		1,353,728	100.00
Republican hold			

== Texas ==
2014 Texas gubernatorial election
- November 4, 2014
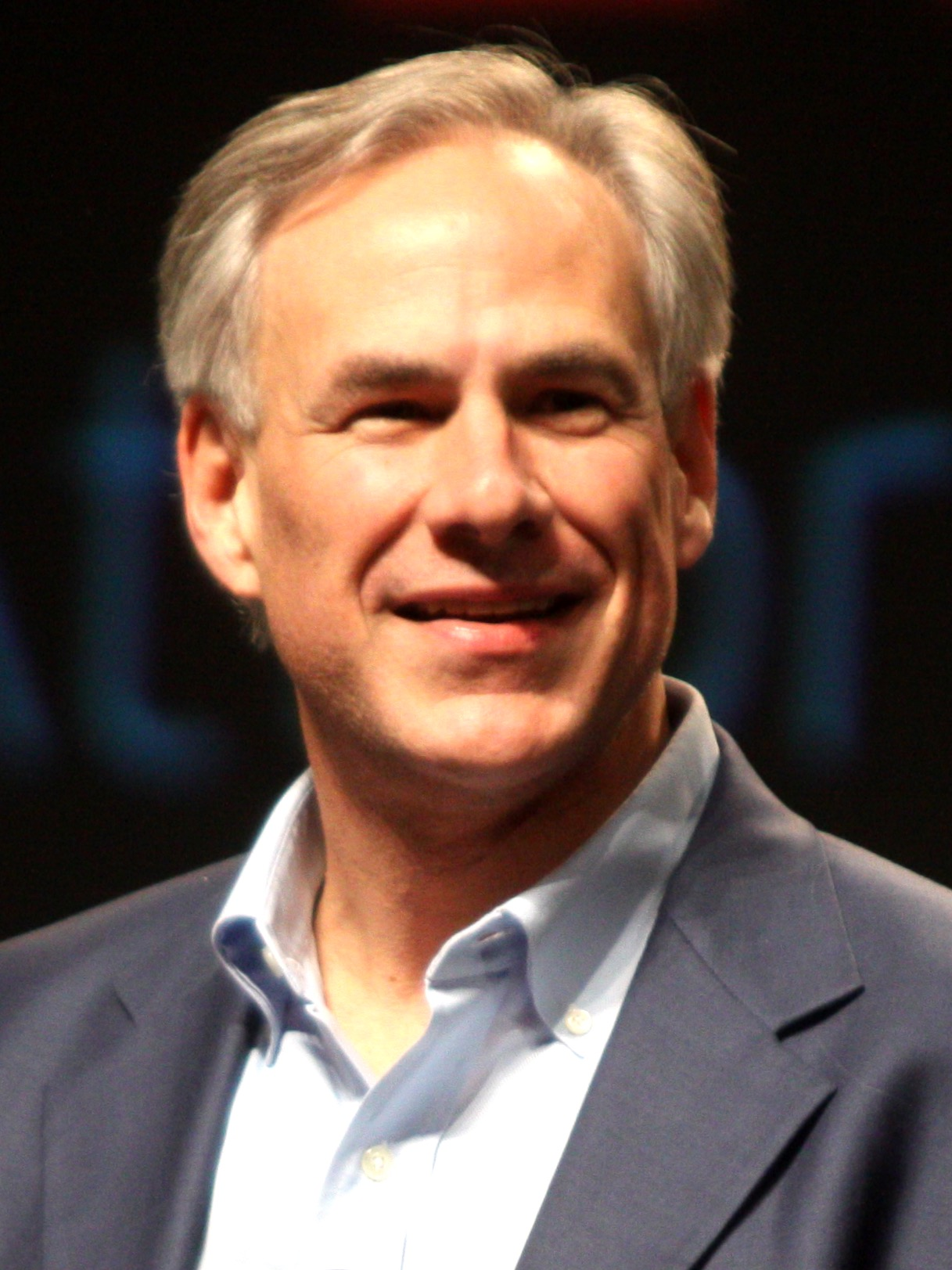

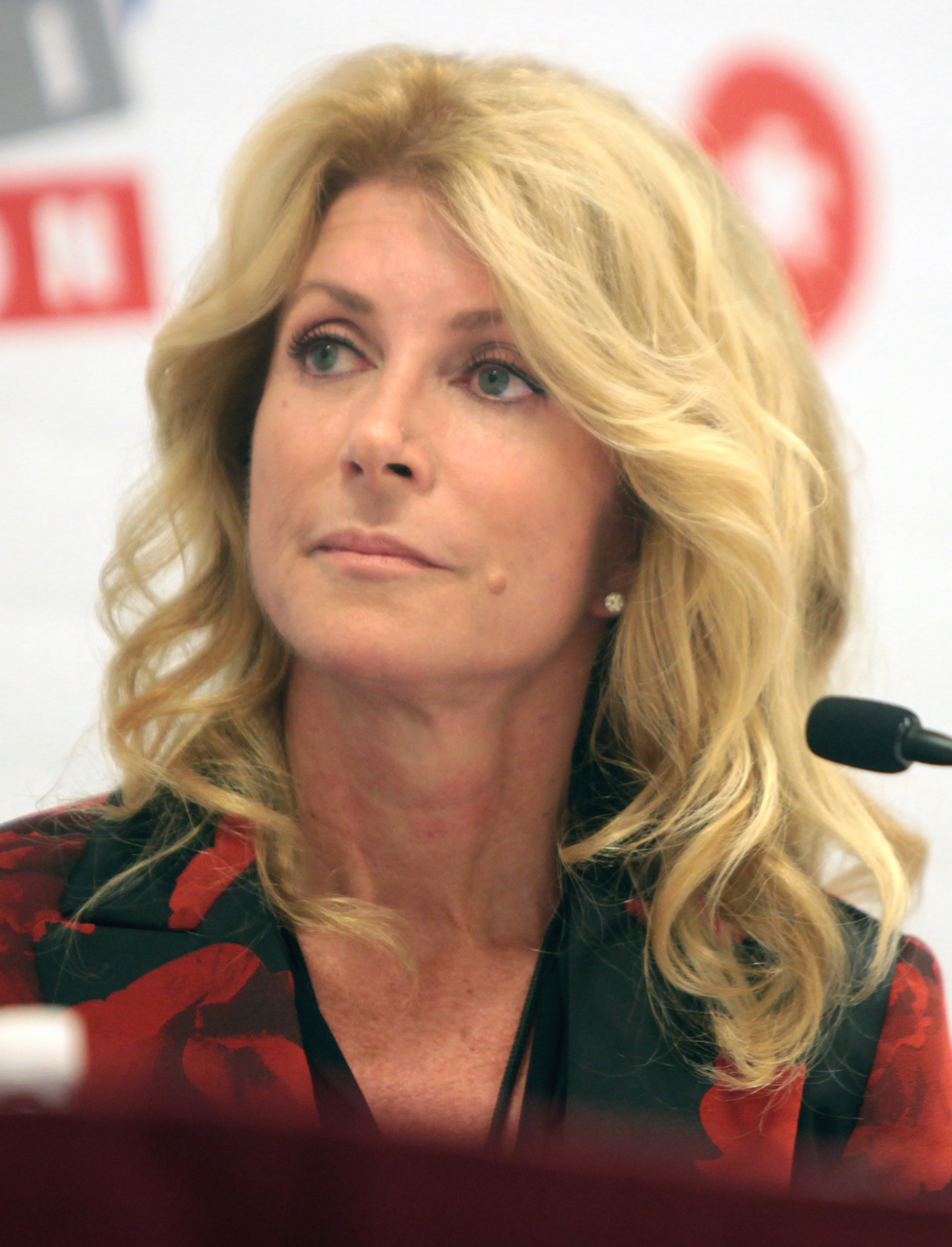
Nominee	Greg Abbott	Wendy Davis
Party	Republican	Democratic
Popular vote	2,796,547	1,835,596
Percentage	59.3%	38.9%
- County results
Governor before election
Rick Perry
Republican
Elected Governor
Greg Abbott
Republican

Governor Rick Perry was eligible to run for re-election, but chose not to seek a fourth term on July 8, 2013. Perry was re-elected to a third term with 55.1% of the vote in 2010.

Attorney General Greg Abbott was the Republican Party nominee, having defeated perennial candidate Larry Kilgore, Lisa Fritsch and former Univision personality Miriam Martinez in the Republican primary.

State Senator Wendy Davis was the Democratic Party nominee. Abbott won the election with 59.3% of the vote.

Texas general election
Party	Candidate	Votes	%
Republican	Greg Abbott	2,796,547	59.27
Democratic	Wendy Davis	1,835,596	38.90
Libertarian	Kathie Glass	66,543	1.41
Green	Brandon Parmer	18,520	0.39
Write-in		1,062	0.02
Total votes		4,718,268	100.00
Republican hold			

== Vermont ==
2014 Vermont gubernatorial election
- November 4, 2014
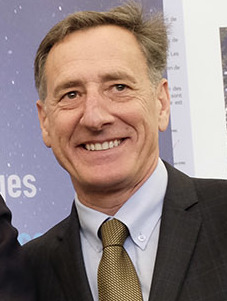

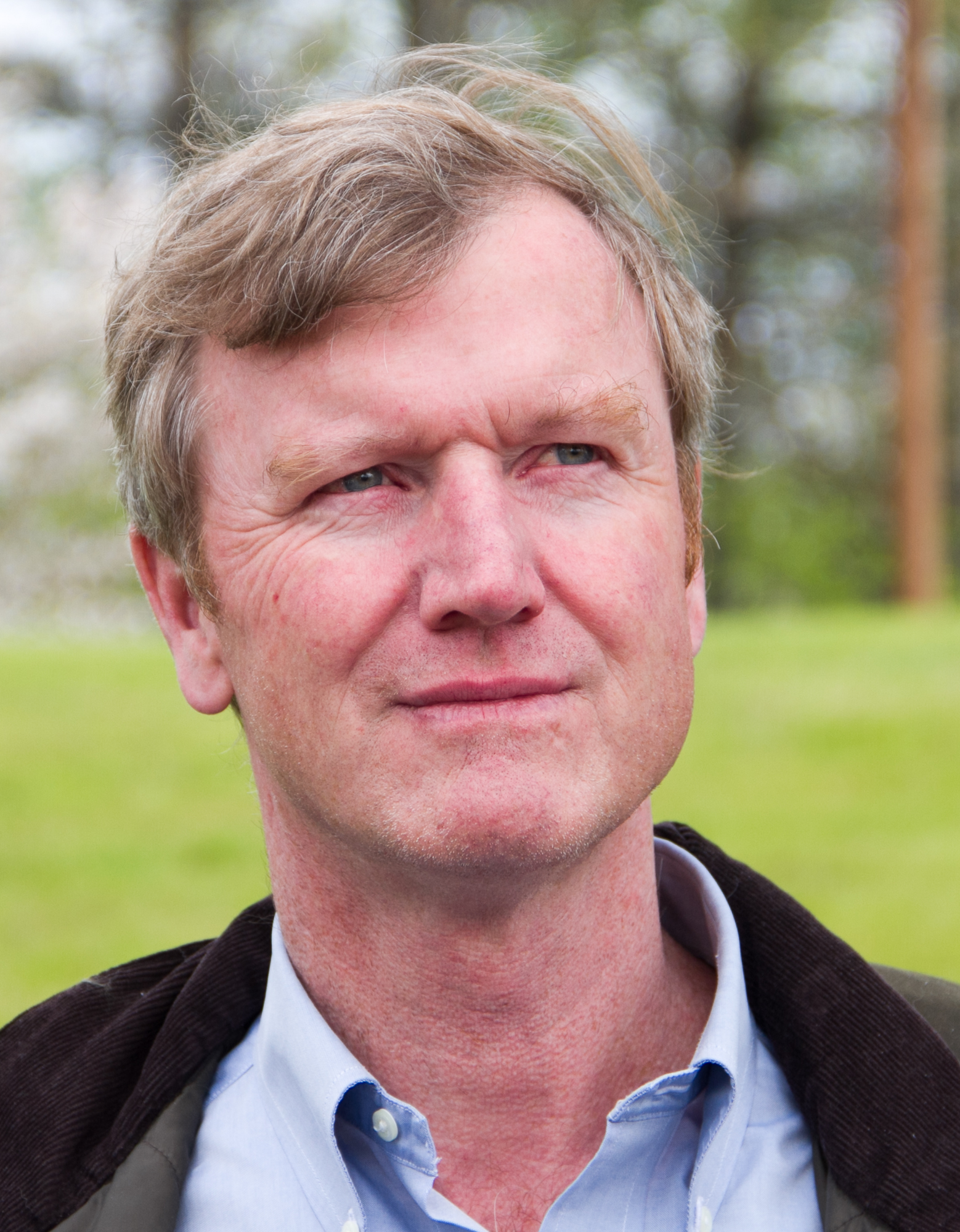
Nominee	Peter Shumlin	Scott Milne
Party	Democratic	Republican
Popular vote	89,509	87,075
Percentage	46.4%	45.1%
- County results
Governor before election
Peter Shumlin
Democratic
Elected Governor
Peter Shumlin
Democratic

Governor Peter Shumlin, re-elected in 2012, sought re-election. Vermont governors serve two-year terms. He faced Republican businessman Scott Milne, among many other candidates, in the general election.

Since no candidate received more than 50% of the vote, the Vermont General Assembly voted to choose the winner, of which Shumlin won re-election by a vote of 110–69, with one abstention.

Vermont general election
Party	Candidate	Votes	%
Democratic	Peter Shumlin (incumbent)	89,509	46.36
Republican	Scott Milne	87,075	45.10
Libertarian	Dan Feliciano	8,428	4.36
Independent	Emily Peyton	3,157	1.64
Liberty Union	Peter Diamondstone	1,673	0.87
Independent	Bernard Peters	1,434	0.74
Independent	Cris Ericson	1,089	0.56
Write-in		722	0.37
Total votes		193,087	100.00
Democratic hold			

== Wisconsin ==
2014 Wisconsin gubernatorial election
- November 4, 2014
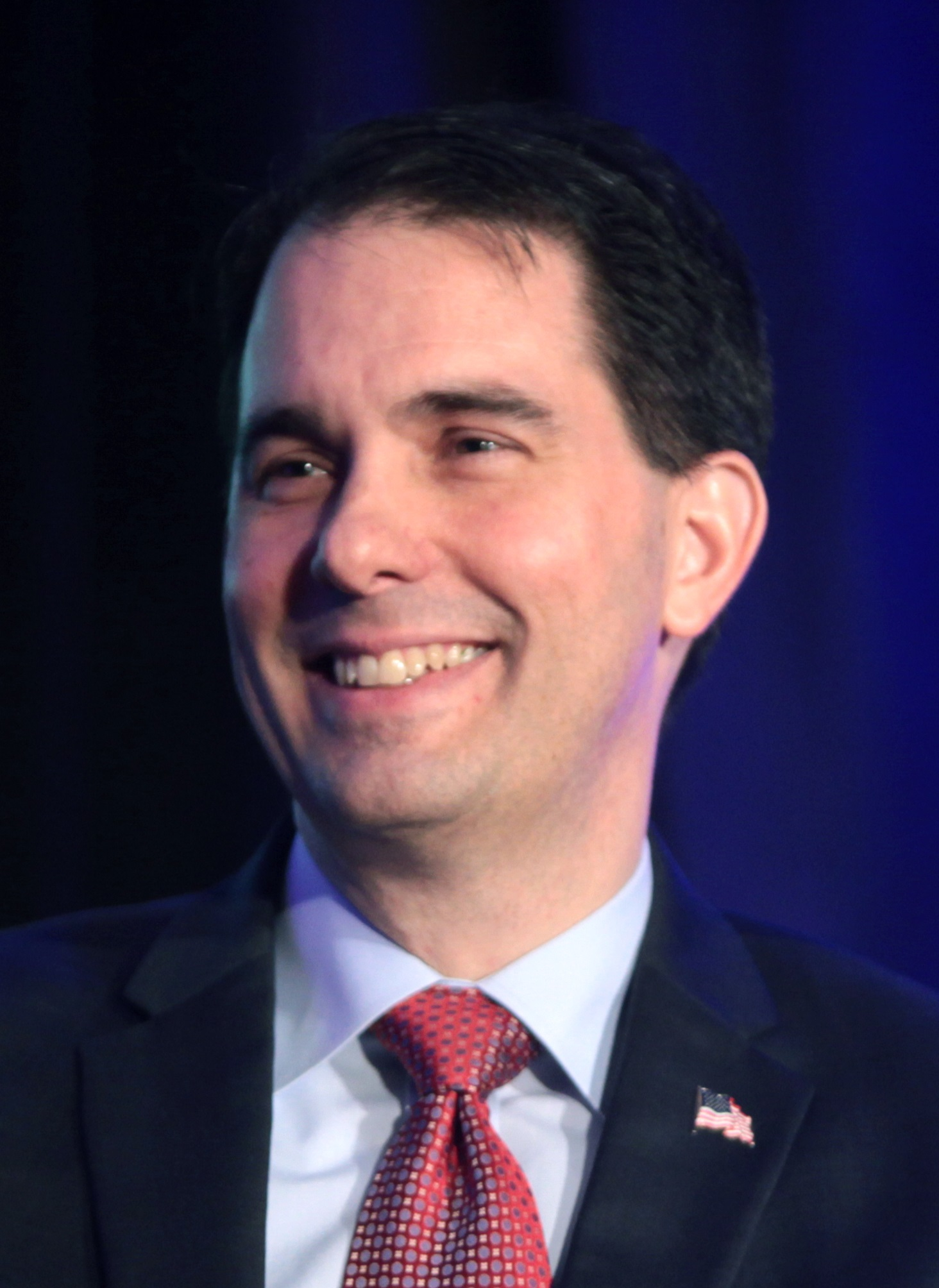

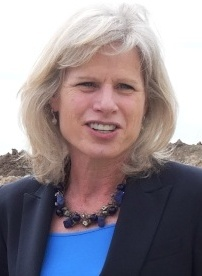
Nominee	Scott Walker	Mary Burke
Party	Republican	Democratic
Running mate	Rebecca Kleefisch	John Lehman
Popular vote	1,259,706	1,122,913
Percentage	52.3%	46.6%
- County results
Governor before election
Scott Walker
Republican
Elected Governor
Scott Walker
Republican

Governor Scott Walker sought re-election. Walker was elected with 52.3% of the vote in 2010 and was subject to an unsuccessful recall election in 2012, which he won with 53.1% of the vote.

Former Wisconsin Secretary of Commerce Mary Burke ran for the Democratic nomination.

Walker was re-elected to a second term.

Wisconsin general election
Party	Candidate	Votes	%
Republican	Scott Walker (incumbent)	1,259,706	52.26
Democratic	Mary Burke	1,122,913	46.59
Libertarian	Robert Burke	18,720	0.78
Independent	Dennis Fehr	7,530	0.31
Write-in		1,445	0.06
Total votes		2,410,314	100.00
Republican hold			

== Wyoming ==
2014 Wyoming gubernatorial election
- November 4, 2014
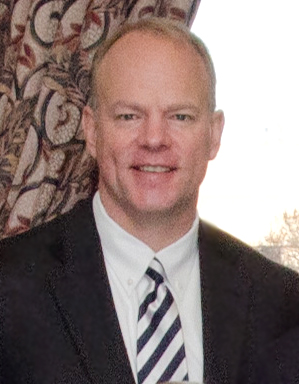

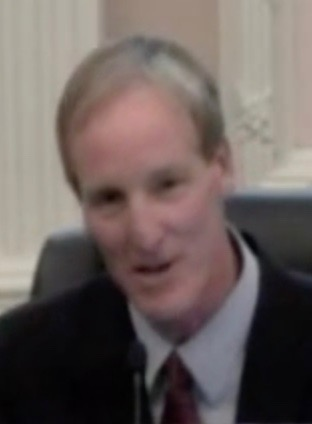

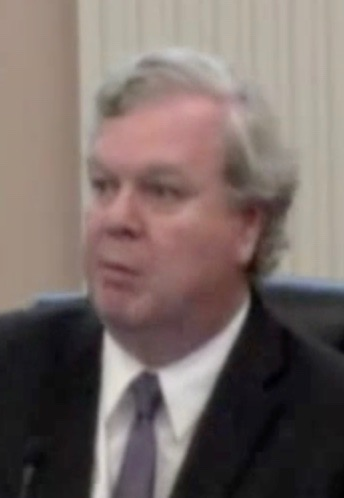
Nominee	Matt Mead	Pete Gosar	Don Wills
Party	Republican	Democratic	Independent
Popular vote	99,700	45,752	9,895
Percentage	59.4%	27.3%	5.9%
- County results
Governor before election
Matt Mead
Republican
Elected Governor
Matt Mead
Republican

Governor Matt Mead sought re-election. Mead was elected with 65.68% of the vote in 2010. He won the GOP primary on August 19, 2014, with 55% of the vote against Taylor Haynes (32%) and Cindy Hill (13%). The Democratic nominee is Pete Gosar.

Wyoming general election
Party	Candidate	Votes	%
Republican	Matt Mead (incumbent)	99,700	59.39
Democratic	Pete Gosar	45,752	27.25
Independent	Don Wills	9,895	5.89
Libertarian	Dee Cozzens	4,040	2.41
Write-in		8,490	5.06
Total votes		167,877	100.00
Republican hold			

== Territories and federal district ==
=== District of Columbia ===
2014 Washington, D.C. mayoral election
- November 4, 2014
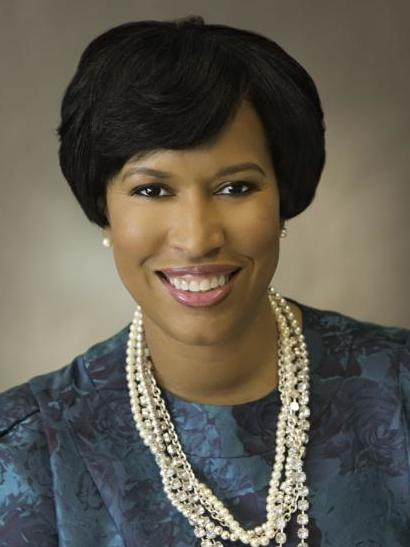

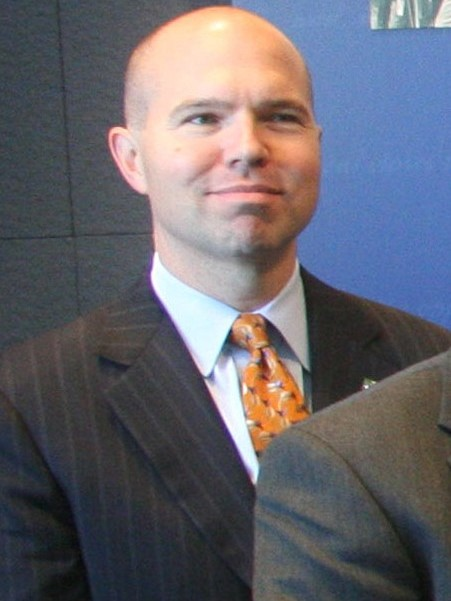

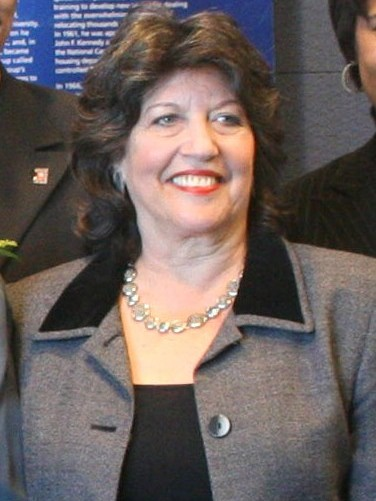
Nominee	Muriel Bowser	David Catania	Carol Schwartz
Party	Democratic	Independent	Independent
Popular vote	96,666	61,388	12,327
Percentage	55.3%	35.1%	7.1%
- Ward results
Mayor before election
Vincent C. Gray
Democratic
Elected Mayor
Muriel Bowser
Democratic

Mayor Vincent C. Gray sought re-election. Gray was elected with 74.2% of the vote in 2010.

Gray faced a competitive primary with challenges from four members of the district council, including Muriel Bowser, Jack Evans, Vincent Orange, and Tommy Wells, as well as former State Department official Reta Jo Lewis and activist Andy Shallal. Bowser defeated Gray for the Democratic nomination by over 10 points.

David Catania, another district councilman, and Carol Schwartz, a former councilwoman and perennial candidate, ran in the general election as independents. Other candidates included Libertarian nominee Bruce Majors and Statehood Green nominee Faith Dane.

Bowser won the election, becoming the second female mayor of the District of Columbia since Sharon Pratt left office in 1995. She was also elected to the lowest share of the vote in Washington, D.C. history.

Washington, D.C. general election
Party	Candidate	Votes	%
Democratic	Muriel Bowser	96,666	55.30
Independent	David Catania	61,388	35.12
Independent	Carol Schwartz	12,327	7.05
DC Statehood Green	Faith Dane	1,520	0.87
Libertarian	Bruce Majors	1,297	0.74
Write-in		1,612	0.92
Total votes		174,810	100.00
Democratic hold			

=== Guam ===
2014 Guam gubernatorial election
- November 4, 2014
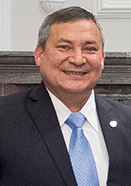

Nominee	Eddie Calvo	Carl Gutierrez
Party	Republican	Democratic
Running mate	Ray Tenorio	Gary Gumataotao
Popular vote	22,512	12,712
Percentage	63.7%	36.0%
- Village results
Governor before election
Eddie Calvo
Republican
Elected Governor
Eddie Calvo
Republican

Governor Eddie Calvo ran for re-election to a second term. Calvo was elected with 50.61% of the vote in 2010, defeating former Democratic governor Carl Gutierrez.

In June 2014, Gutierrez announced his intention to challenge Governor Calvo, setting up a rematch of the 2010 gubernatorial contest.

Calvo won re-election to a second term.

Guam general election
Party	Candidate	Votes	%
Republican	Eddie Calvo (incumbent)	22,512	63.70
Democratic	Carl Gutierrez	12,712	35.97
Write-in		117	0.33
Total votes		35,341	100.00
Republican hold			

=== Northern Mariana Islands ===
2014 Northern Mariana Islands gubernatorial election
- November 4 and 18, 2014
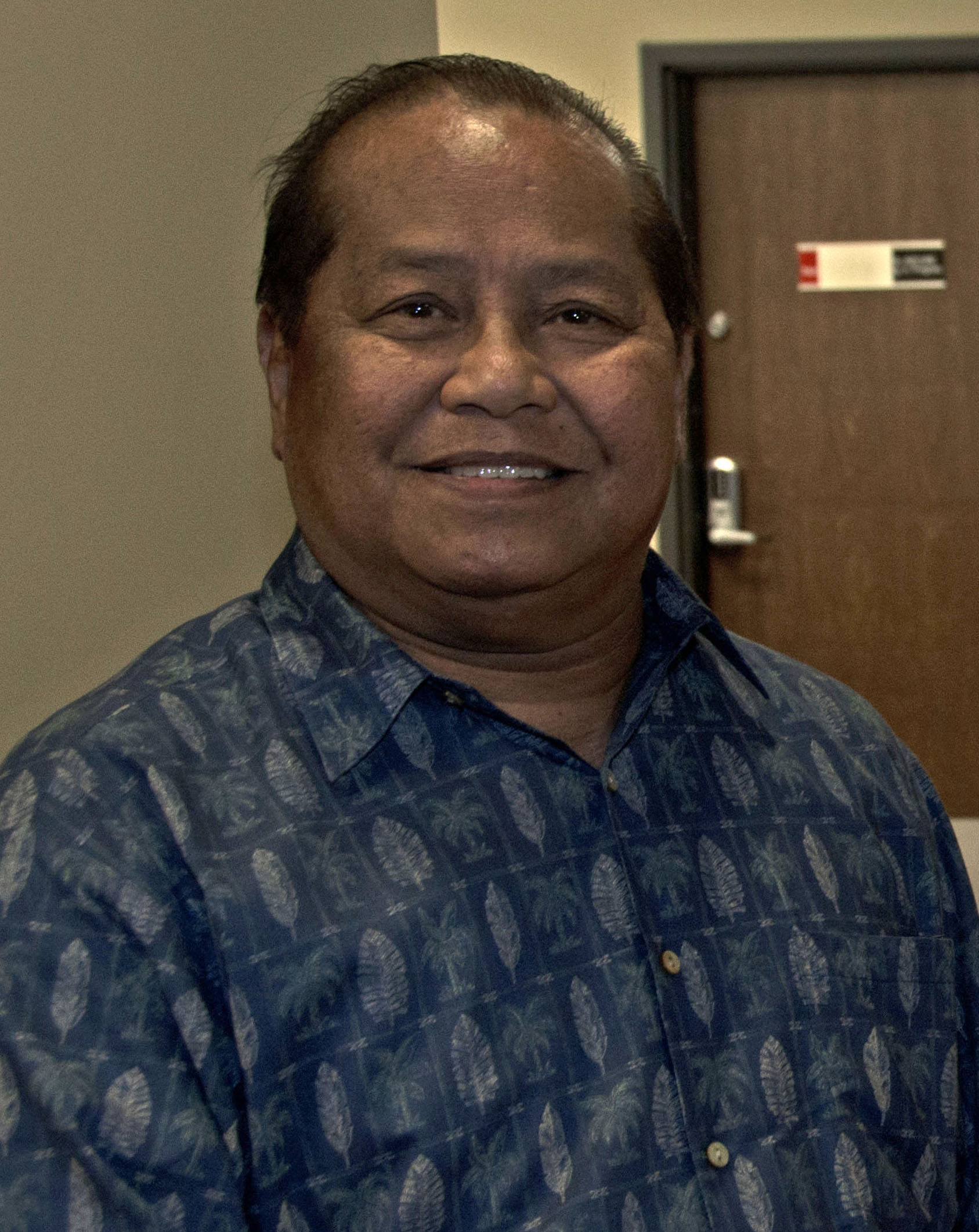

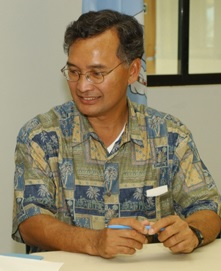
Nominee	Eloy Inos	Heinz Hofschneider	Juan Babauta
Party	Republican	Independent	Independent
Running mate	Ralph Torres	Ray Yumul	Juan Torres
Popular vote	6,342 general 6,547 runoff	4,501 general 4,958 runoff	2,414 general
Percentage	46.0% general 57.0% runoff	32.6% general 43.0% runoff	17.5% general
- Results by voting district: Eloy Inos: 50–55% 55–60% 60–65% 65–70% >95% Heinz Hofschneider: 50–55%
Governor before election
Eloy Inos
Republican
Elected Governor
Eloy Inos
Republican

Governor Eloy Inos, who was elected as lieutenant governor in 2009 as a member of the Covenant Party, succeeded his predecessor Benigno Fitial (R) upon the latter's resignation on February 20, 2013, sought a full term. In September 2013 he moved to re-unify the Covenant Party with the Republican Party, and is running as a Republican in 2014. His running mate is Senate President Ralph Torres (R-Saipan).

Former Ports Authority executive director Edward "Tofila" Deleon Guerrero is running as a Democrat, with former representative Danny Quitugua as his running mate.

Former Republican governor Juan Babauta is running as an independent, with former Republican senator Juan Torres as his running mate.

2009 Republican candidate Heinz Hofschneider ran as an independent, with Senator Ray Yumul (I-Saipan) as his running mate.

Inos won election to a full term.

Northern Mariana Islands general election
Party	Candidate	Votes	%
Republican	Eloy Inos (incumbent)	6,342	45.96
Independent	Heinz Hofschneider	4,501	32.62
Independent	Juan Babauta	2,414	17.50
Democratic	Edward Guerrero	541	3.92
Total votes		13,798	100.00

Northern Mariana Islands runoff election
Party	Candidate	Votes	%
Republican	Eloy Inos (incumbent)	6,547	56.96
Independent	Heinz Hofschneider	4,948	43.04
Total votes		11,495	100.00
Republican hold			

=== U.S. Virgin Islands ===
2014 U.S. Virgin Islands gubernatorial election
- November 4 and 18, 2014
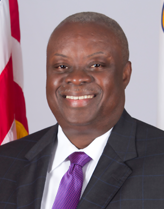

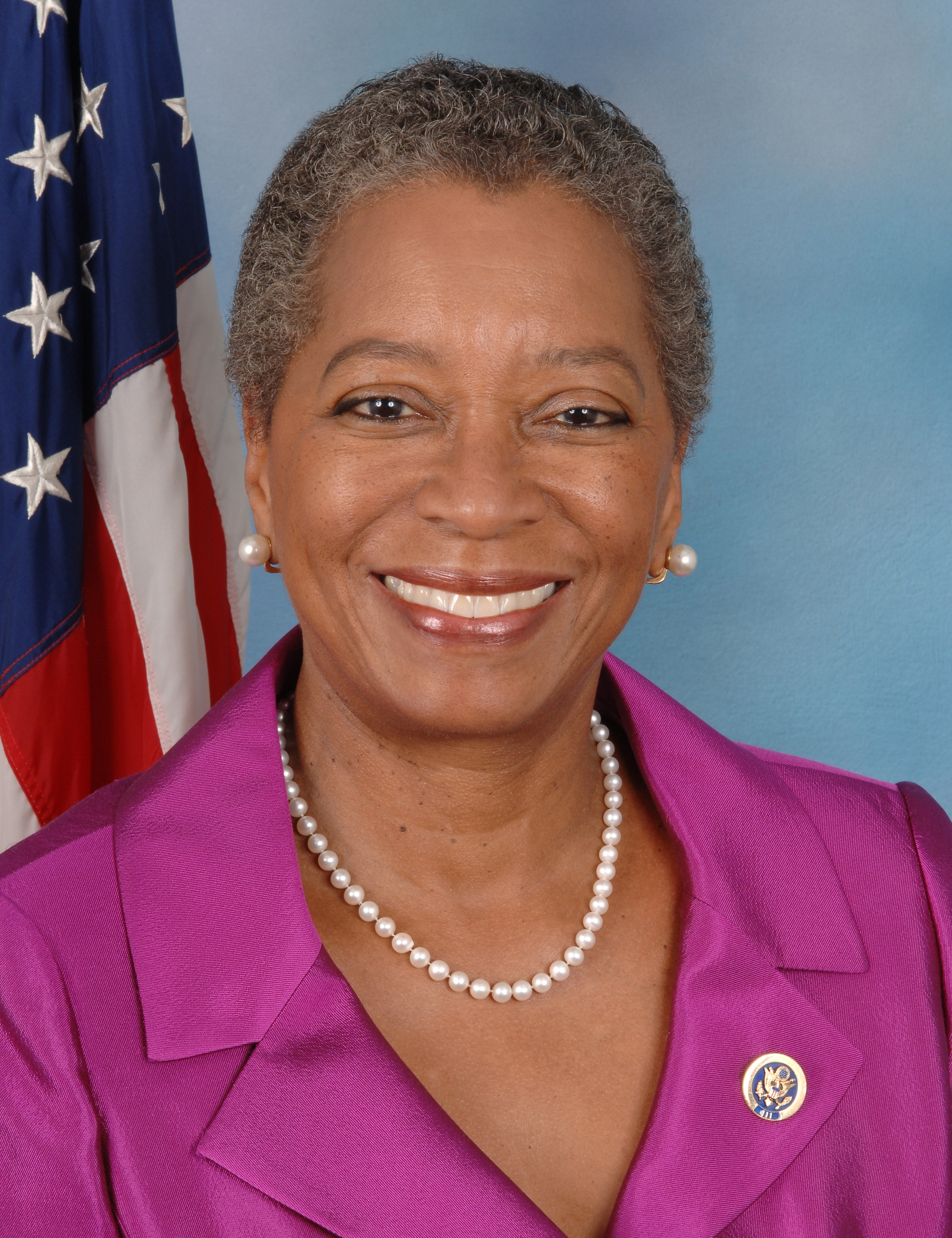
Nominee	Kenneth Mapp	Donna Christian-Christensen
Party	Independent	Democratic
Running mate	Osbert Potter	Basil Ottley Jr.
Popular vote	12,108 general 15,268 runoff	10,173 general 8,573 runoff
Percentage	46.6% general 63.9% runoff	39.2% general 35.9% runoff
Nominee	Soraya Diase Coffelt	Mona Barnes
Party	Independent	Independent
Running mate		Wendy Coram
Popular vote	1,837 general	1,693 general
Percentage	7.1% general	6.5% general
Governor before election
John de Jongh
Democratic
Elected Governor
Kenneth Mapp
Independent

Governor John de Jongh was term-limited in 2014. He was re-elected with 56.3% of the vote in 2010.

U.S. House delegate Donna Christian-Christensen won the Democratic primary against a crowded field of candidates, which included former territorial legislator Adlah Donastorg Jr., incumbent lieutenant governor Gregory Francis, and former lieutenant governor Gerard Luz James. Among the independent candidates were former court judge Soraya Diase Coffelt and former lieutenant governor Kenneth Mapp, who sought the governorship for the third time in a row.

After a runoff was held when no candidate reached a majority of votes, Mapp won the election.

U.S. Virgin Islands general election
Party	Candidate	Votes	%
Independent	Kenneth Mapp	12,108	46.61
Democratic	Donna Christian-Christensen	10,173	39.16
Independent	Soraya Diase Coffelt	1,837	7.07
Independent	Mona Barnes	1,693	6.52
Independent	Sheila A. Scullion	83	0.32
Write-in		81	0.31
Total votes		25,975	100.00

U.S. Virgin Islands runoff election
Party	Candidate	Votes	%
Independent	Kenneth Mapp	15,268	63.89
Democratic	Donna Christian-Christensen	8,573	35.87
Write-in		58	0.24
Total votes		23,899	100.00
Independent gain from Democratic			

== See also ==
- 2014 United States elections
  - 2014 United States Senate elections
  - 2014 United States House of Representatives elections
