= List of New Mexico wildfires =

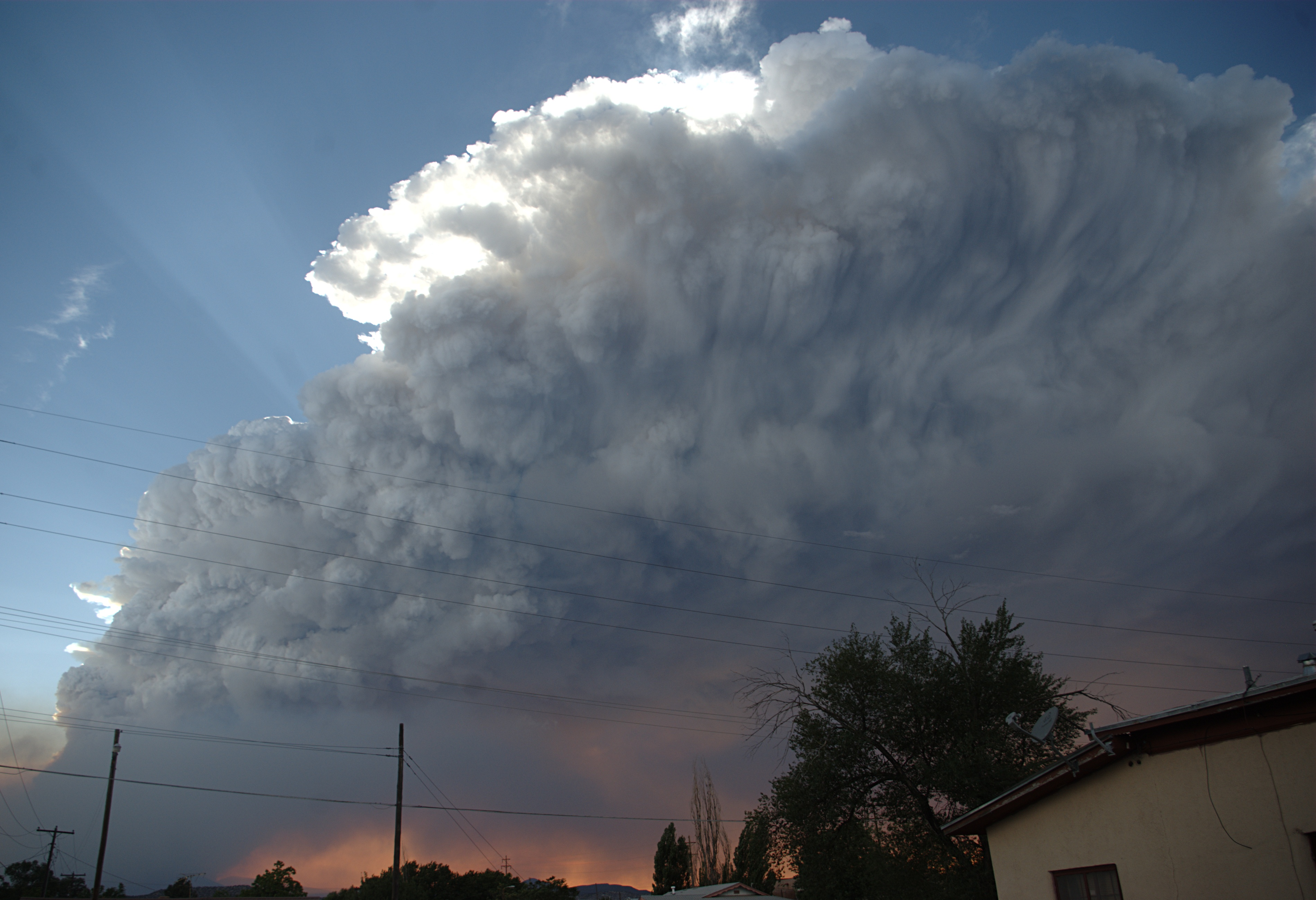
Smoke from the Las Conchas fire in 2011

This is a partial and incomplete list of wildfires in the US state of New Mexico. New Mexico has dry, windy, and often hot weather conditions that often produce moderate to severe wildfires.

== Background ==
While "fire season" can vary every year in New Mexico based on weather conditions, most wildfires occur in from early May through June, before the monsoon season. However, there is an increasing fire risk year-round from climate change. Droughts are becoming more common partly from rising temperatures in the state that evaporate water from streams. Unpredictable monsoon levels can increase fire risks. New Mexico is prone to strong winds, and jet stream disruption from climate change can make them stronger. Intense winds contribute to drought, allow wildfires to spread, and dry out vegetation. Unique plant life and fine fuels in the state fuel wildfires, especially in the Eastern New Mexico grasslands. Rising temperatures will reduce snowpack and shorten the snowmelt season which can increase drought and wildfire severity.

Overgrazing and logging in the late 1800s and over 100 years of strict fire suppression affected natural systems of New Mexico led to a growing wildfire risk and intensity. Scientists predict New Mexico's forests will gradually deteriorate, turning into shrublands as wildfires burn the forests.

== Statistics ==
Starting in 2007, the National Interagency Fire Center began keeping more accurate records on the total fire acreage burned in each state.

Year	Fires	Acres	Hectares	Ref
2007	1,603	179,024	72,448	
2008	1,322	561,789	227,348	
2009	1,354	520,613	210,685	
2010	1,061	294,459	119,163	
2011	1,950	1,541,249	623,721	
2012	1,088	402,511	162,890	
2013	1,109	238,425	96,487	
2014	793	59,532	24,092	
2015	768	67,197	27,194	
2016	1,313	264,617	107,087	
2017	892	233,317	94,420	
2018	449	104,410	42,250	
2019	859	79,887	32,329	
2020	1,018	109,512	44,318	
2021	672	123,792	50,097	
2022	748	859,906	347,992	
2023	1,019	212,378	85,946	
2024	823	82,531	33,399	

== List of wildfires ==
- Capitan Gap Fire
- Water Canyon Fire
- Salvation Fire
- La Mesa Fire
- Dome Fire
- Oso Complex Fire
- Cerro Grande Fire
- Ponil Complex Fire
- Trigo Fire
- Las Conchas Fire
- Donaldson Fire
- Whitewater–Baldy complex Fire
- Little Bear Fire
- Silver Fire
- Ute Park Fire
- Johnson Fire
- Calf Canyon/Hermits Peak Fire
- Cerro Pelado Fire
- McBride Fire
- Cooks Peak Fire
- Black Fire
- South Fork Fire

== See also ==
- List of wildfires
- Wildfires in the United States
