= Trigo Fire =

Wildfire in New Mexico, United States

Coordinates: 34.66°N 106.467°W

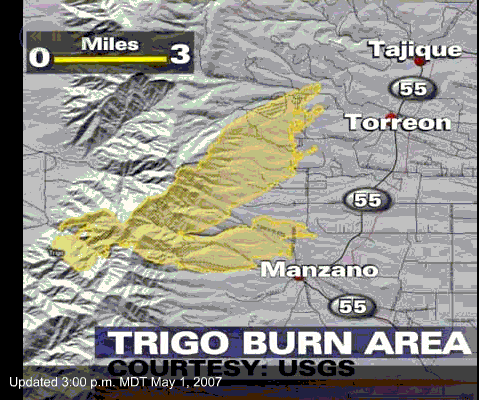
USGS map of the Trigo Fire as of 1 May 2008

The Trigo Fire was a disastrous wildfire in New Mexico, United States of America that occurred during April and May 2008. It affected the communities of Manzano, Torreon and Tajique, burned 59 homes and over 21 square miles (54 km^{2}). The fire was discovered the morning of 15 April 2008, approximately ten miles east of Belen, and had already burned some 200 acres (0.81 km^{2}) on the western slopes of the Manzano Mountains. The fire was 100% contained on 11 May 2008 and the last smoke sighted and extinguished was on 22 May. The US Forest Service said that the fire would not be completely out until snow blanketed the area in December.

== Origin ==
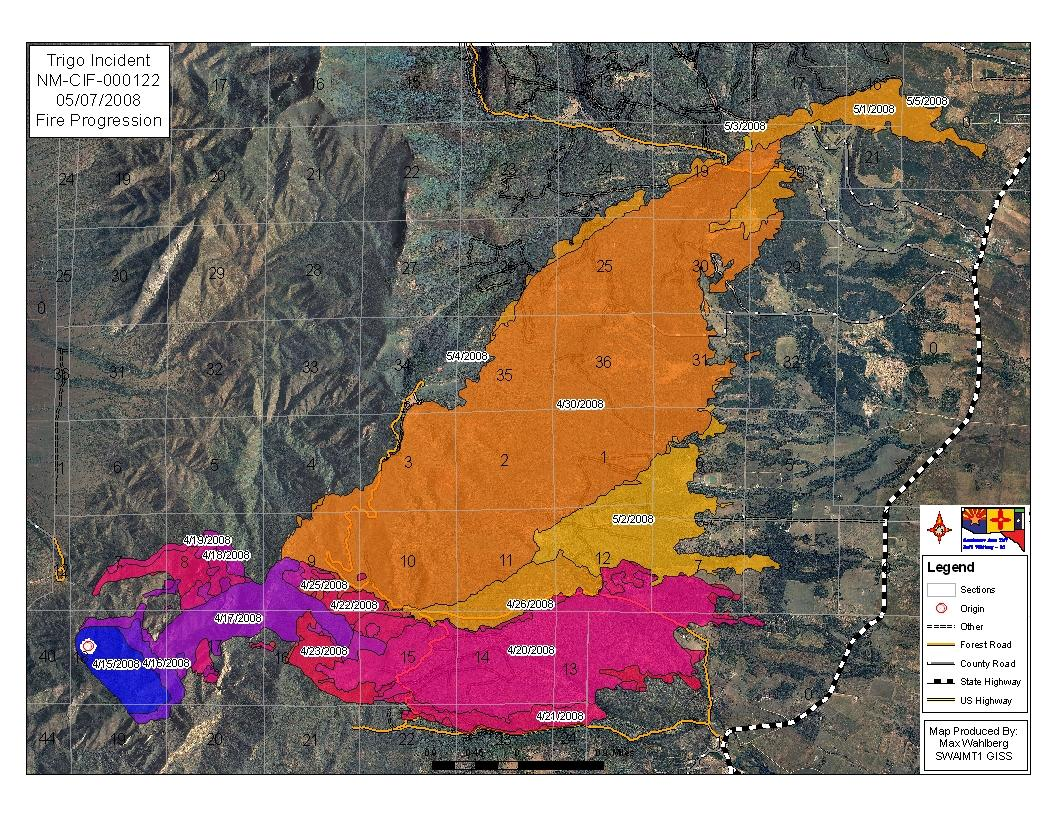
Map of the Trigo Fire as of 7 May 2008

The fire began early in the morning on the 15th of April 2008 in Trigo Canyon (labeled Cañon del Trigo on the USGS map) on the west side of the Manzano Mountains. Trigo is the Spanish word for wheat which was once grown in the lower reaches of the canyon. There is a dirt road up into the canyon and fire investigators determined that there were individuals present in the canyon during the morning of the day the fire began. The fire is believed to have been caused by human negligence. On the morning of the 15th, turkey hunters were seen in the area where the fire started.

The very low relative humidity, high winds, and low fuel moisture coupled with the steep topography made containing the fire very difficult. For several days after the start of the fire the high winds prevented the use of aircraft in fighting the fire.

== Economic effects ==
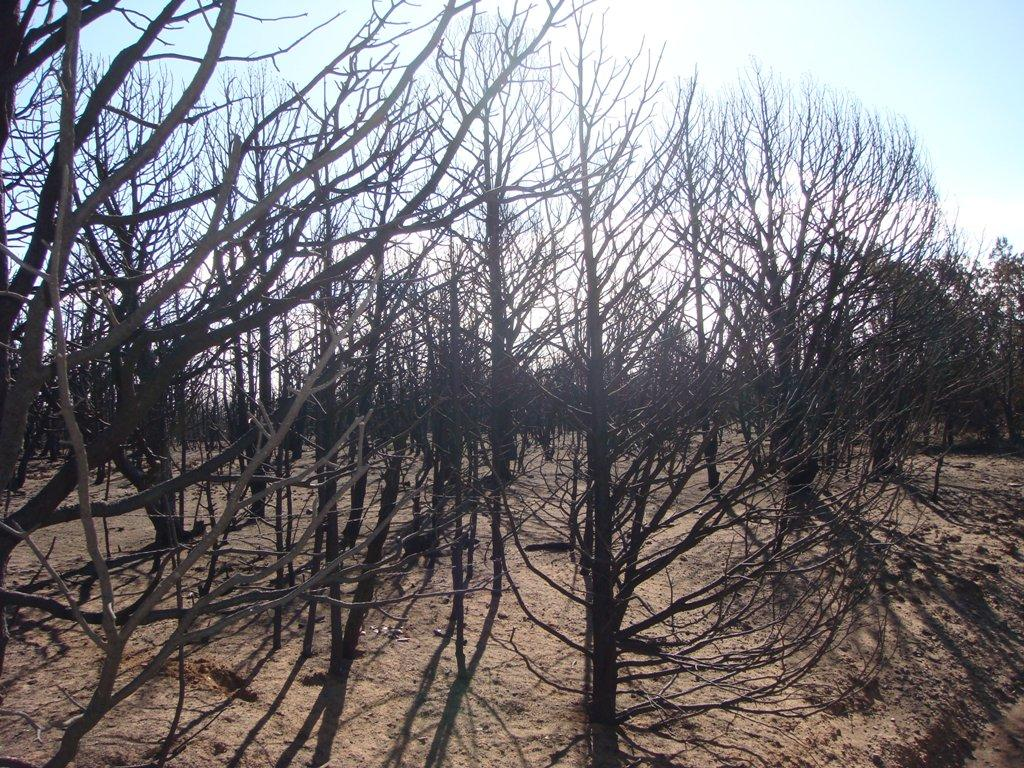
Aftermath of the Trigo Fire

The fire burned 13,709 acres (55 km^{2}) of mostly ponderosa pine, piñon pine, juniper and gambel oak in the Cibola National Forest. The total economic cost of the fire may not be finally determined for years, but initial estimates ranged from $50 to $100 million. The Central New Mexico Electric Cooperative alone lost “a total dollar figure of over $100,000 just in the miles of line alone”, not counting re-installation costs. There were 59 homes destroyed and 40 other structures, representing over $10 million in direct losses. The initial cost of fighting the fire was expected to be $11 million, with an equal amount in clean-up costs.

== See also ==
- 1954 Water Canyon Fire
- 1977 La Mesa Fire
- 1996 Dome Fire
- 1998 Oso Complex Fire
- 2000 Cerro Grande Fire
- List of forest fires
