= Las Conchas Fire =

Wildfire in New Mexico, United States

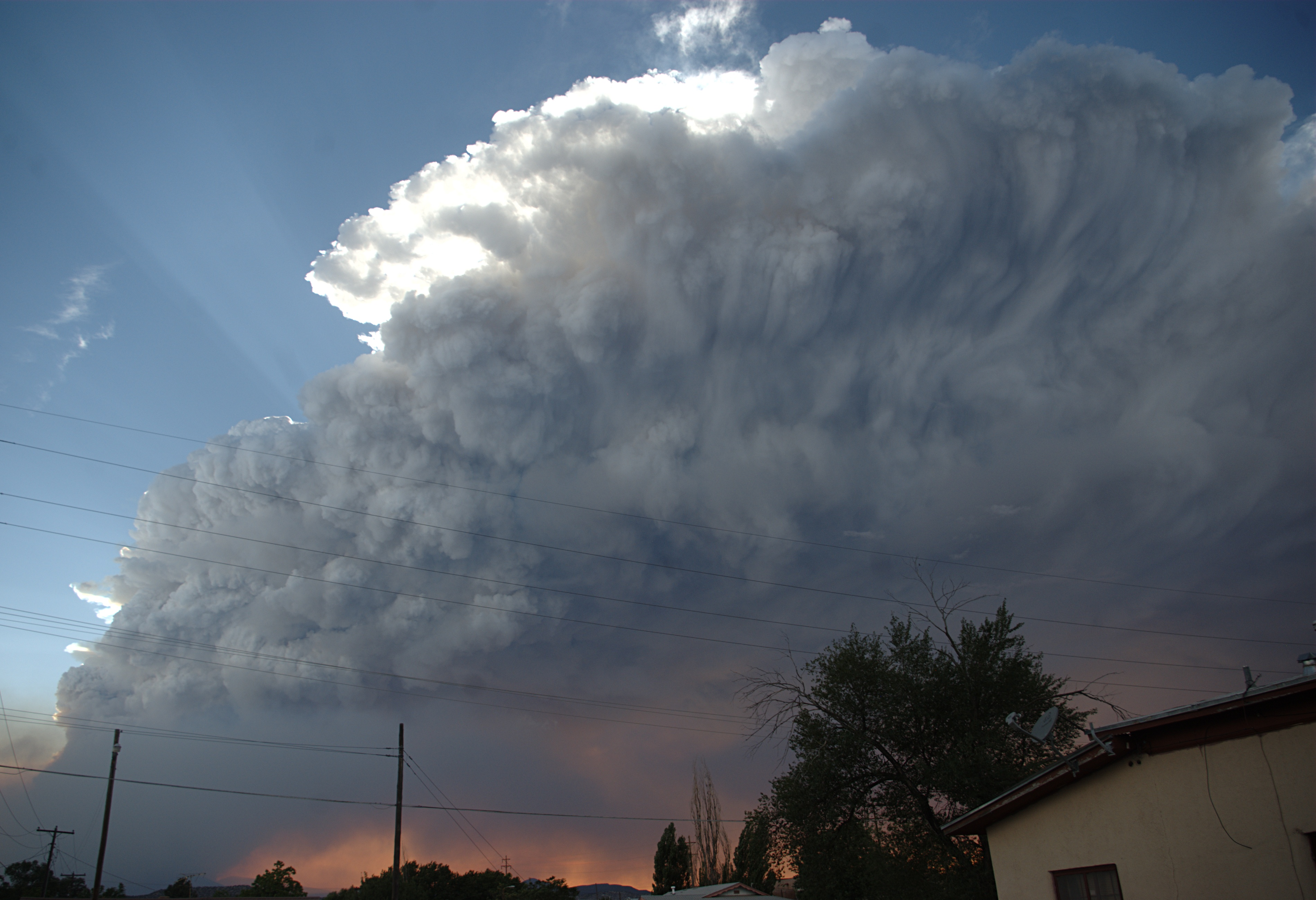
- From Española, New Mexico, June 29, 2011
- Date: June 26, 2011; 1:00 pm; (MDT)
- Location: New Mexico
- Coordinates: 35.803°N 106.440°W

Statistics
- Burned area: 156,293 acres, 244 sq mi (630 km^{2})

Impacts
- Deaths: 0
- Injuries: 15
- Structures destroyed: 63 residences, 49 outbuildings

Ignition
- Cause: Power line

Map
- Location within New Mexico Location within the United States

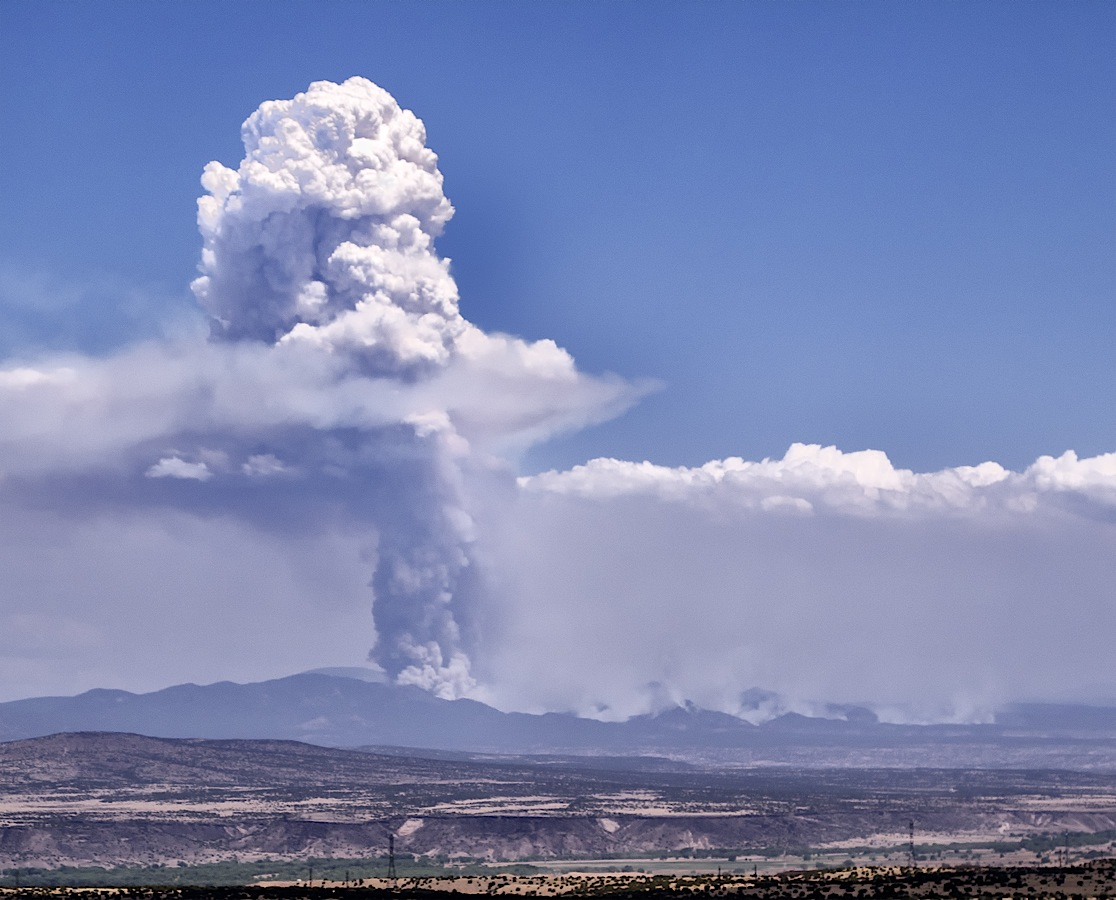
From Placitas, New Mexico, July 6, 2011.

The Las Conchas Fire was a large wildfire in the state of New Mexico, in the United States, in 2011. The fire started in Santa Fe National Forest and burned more than 150,000 acres, threatening Los Alamos National Laboratory and the town of Los Alamos. After five days of burning, it became the largest wildfire in New Mexico state history at the time. It was surpassed in 2012 by the much larger Whitewater-Baldy Complex Fire and in 2022 by the Calf Canyon/Hermits Peak Fire and the Black Fire making the Las Conchas Fire the fourth-largest fire in New Mexico's recorded history.

== Progression ==
The fire started on June 26, 2011, at approximately 1:00 pm Mountain Daylight Time at 35°49′39.47″N 106°28′36.12″W when a gust of wind blew a severely rotted 75 foot (23 m) aspen tree on private property into a power line on a Jemez Electric Cooperative easement. The ignition point remained largely unburned, with the fire jumping to the canopy farther downwind. Usually, wildfires don't spread downward. Instead, they tend to move upward, drying out and igniting fresh vegetation above where they started. This upward movement is a common behavior, as the fire climbs vertically, affecting the surrounding area in an upward direction. However, on the first day, driven by strong and unpredictable winds, the fire burned 43,000 acres in the Jemez Mountains, near the Pajarito Plateau—a rate of about an acre per second.

As per local fire officials, by the evening of the initial day of the wildfire, none of it had been brought under control, leading to a voluntary evacuation order for the county. The fire burned over 61,000 acres by the end of the day on June 27, pushed north by winds into the Pajarito Mountain Ski Area. The fire also burned south, threatening the town of Cochiti, New Mexico. On June 28, this estimate was increased to nearly 61,000 acres. On June 29, it was reported that the fire was 3 percent contained, 12 miles southwest of Los Alamos, and had burned nearly 70,000 acres (109 sq mi). By then the fire had pushed farther north into the land owned and held sacred by Santa Clara Pueblo.

By June 30, the burned area had increased to over 103,000 acres (161 sq mi), making it the largest fire in New Mexico history (the previous largest was the 2003 Dry Lakes Fire, which burned over 94,000 acres).

Mandatory evacuation orders were issued for Los Alamos on June 27, and Los Alamos National Laboratory was closed to all non-essential personnel. The evacuation order was lifted on July 3, at which time Los Alamos residents were allowed to return to their homes. The Los Alamos National Laboratory re-opened on July 6. As of July 14, 2011, the fire was 57% contained.

On June 27, a one-acre spot fire burned on Los Alamos National Laboratory until firefighters extinguished it. Authorities reported that the fire did not threaten essential buildings. That was the only time the fire burned on lab property, as the fire then moved away.

The fire was 100% contained on August 3 with efforts for recovery of the burned areas beginning shortly after. The Las Conchas Fire burned 156,000 acres in the end, much of it at high severity.

== Impact ==
=== Archeological sites ===
The Pajarito Plateau is rich in prehistoric Puebloan archeological sites. A study after the fire confirmed 1,104 of the sites were directly in the burn zone. Damage to sites from high-intensity fire includes spalling of stone structures, coating with soot and wax, and heat-induced cracking of stone and ceramic artifacts.

=== Flooding ===
Destructive flooding occurred in the burned region as the result of heavy monsoon rainstorms on August 21. The flooding was exacerbated by devegetated land and charred soil covered with waxy burn products, making the land in the burn scar hydrophobic.

==== Santa Clara Pueblo ====
Sixteen thousand acres of Santa Clara Pueblo land burned in the fire, much of it in the pueblo's watershed. Forty-five percent of the watershed was burned, leading to fears of flooding. The pueblo responded by preparing for floods. As much of the burned area is still as of 2022 at risk for dangerous flash floods, the pueblo installed three large steel and concrete debris racks on Santa Clara Creek upstream from the pueblo. Videos exist on Youtube.com showing flash flooding and debris flows in the pueblo in the years after the fire.

==== Bandelier National Monument ====
In Frijoles Canyon, National Park Service workers piled sandbags and used jersey barriers in a successful effort to protect the historic visitor center at Bandelier National Monument and other structures and cultural assets from flooding along El Rito de los Frijoles. Although the efforts did indeed save structures and assets from damage, widespread damage occurred in the watershed, including to trails, buildings, and archeological sites.

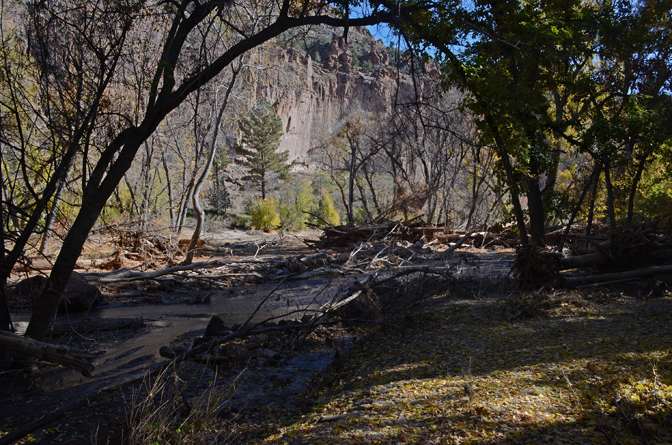
Flood damage below Long House, Bandelier National Monument

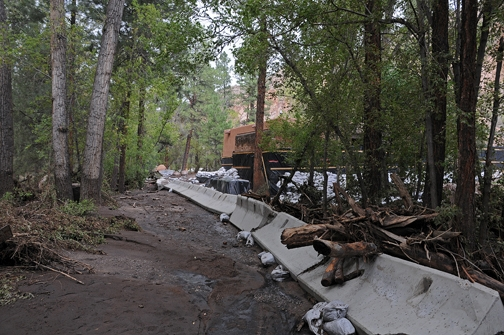
Flood damage at the visitor center, Bandelier National Monument

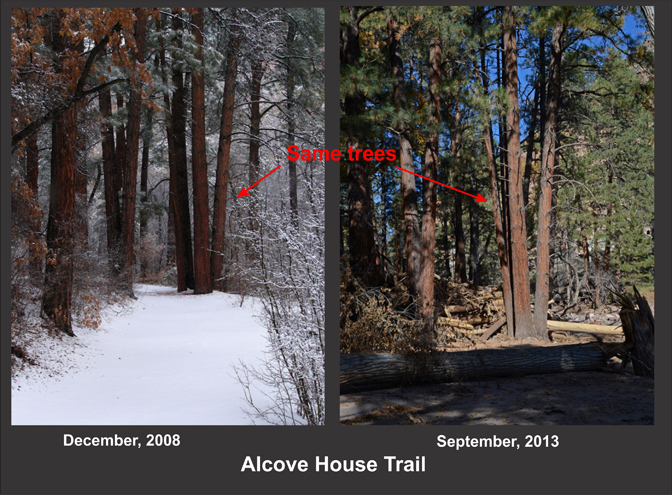
Flood damage along the Alcove House Trail, Bandelier National Monument

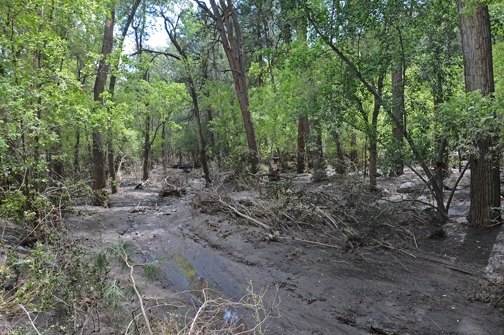
Flood damage on El Rito de los Frijoles, Bandelier National Monument

==== Dixon's Apple Orchard ====
A popular tradition in New Mexico was the fall harvest at Dixon's Apple Orchard, a family-owned orchard in Cochiti Canyon near Cochiti, New Mexico, established in 1944 from grafts from a wild apple tree found growing nearby. Earlier in the year, a late frost had damaged some of the approximately 3,000 New Mexico desert apple trees. On the first day of the fire, the flames reached the canyon walls that surround the orchard. The owners home, some of the equipment, and about 300 apple trees were destroyed by the flames. Efforts to subdue the fire on the property is cited with saving thousands of these trees. However, on August 22, following the heavy monsoon rains, a massive flood laden with ash, boulders, and woodland debris swept through the canyon nearly two hours after rain clouds appeared over the mountains. The flood waters turned the small Rio Chiquito into a torrent "as wide as a football field" sufficient to cover the canyon from one wall to the other, damaging trees that had survived the fire, and covering the orchard in several feet (over a meter) of sediment. The next day, while cleaning up and working to repair the orchard, a second flood hit the canyon, covering the orchard in a depth of over 12 feet (3.7 metres) of blackened water. Video exits on Youtube.com showing the destructive flooding.

In January 2016, the land the orchard occupied was returned to Cochiti Pueblo in a land swap agreement. The ruins of the ancestral home, Old Cochiti Pueblo, overlooks the canyon immediately above the orchard; the Pueblo holds these lands as sacred. Remnants of the orchard, including several hundred apple trees, still stand in the canyon.

==== Rio Grande ====
The burn scar lies directly in the watershed of the Rio Grande, the most important watersource in this region of the Southwest. Since the Rio Grande is a large watercourse, and the affected watersheds lie immediately upstream from Cochiti Dam, which manages flood control in the middle Rio Grande Valley, fears of flooding on the river were minimal. However, as ash and debris were swept into the river following the August floods, water quality was of concern, since the waters from Cochiti Reservoir are used from the dam down to Socorro for irrigation and drinking water, including agricultural use and domestic supply in Albuquerque, New Mexico's largest city; its capital of Santa Fe, as well as several Pueblos and other communities.

== Liability ==
As the tree that started the fire was on private property, but fell onto a utility easement, New Mexico State Environment Department investigated the ignition point and identified the igniter tree as an aspen on private property. The Jemez Electric Cooperitive, which owns and operates the lines, argued the tree was on private property and therefore had no authority to cut it down, having trimmed all trees within the easement in the previous two summers. The Coop blamed the Forest Service for not clearing the tree. The Forest Service argued that inspecting every tree along its borders was unrealistic, and pointed out language in the easement contract that requires the Coop to clear snags that lean toward its easements.

Jurors in the Sandoval County court found the liability to be 75% to the Jemez Electric Cooperative, which owns and operates the powerline, 20% to the Tri-State Generation and Transmission Inc., which generates the electric energy which started the fire, and 5% to the U.S. Forest Service, as the tree was on private property managed by the service.

The Forest Service billed the Coop $38 million for the cost of starting the fire, including supplies and equipment, firefighter wages, initial remediation, damages, and lost recreational income. Two Pueblos also filed for compensation against the Coop, in addition to seeking compensation from the Forest Service, who granted the Coop the utility easement.

== See also ==
- 1954 Water Canyon Fire
- 1977 La Mesa Fire
- 1996 Dome Fire
- 1998 Oso Complex Fire
- 2000 Cerro Grande Fire
