= Los Alamos, New Mexico =

Census-designated place in New Mexico, United States

- Census-designated place
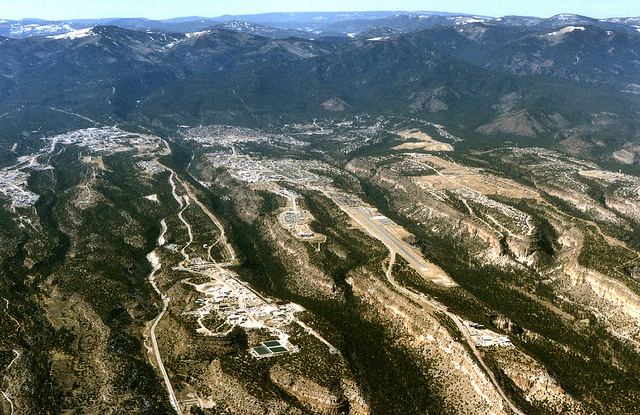
- A westward aerial view of Los Alamos
- Nicknames: Atomic City; The Hill; Site Y; Secret City (past)
- Motto: "Where discoveries are made"
- Location of Los Alamos, New Mexico

- Location in New Mexico Location in the contiguous United States
- Coordinates: 35°52′53″N 106°17′56″W
- Country: United States
- State: New Mexico
- County: Los Alamos

Area
  - Total: 11.11 sq mi (28.77 km^{2})
  - Land: 11.11 sq mi (28.77 km^{2})
  - Water: 0 sq mi (0.00 km^{2})
- Elevation: 7,300 ft (2,200 m)

Population (2020)
  - Total: 13,179
  - Density: 1,186.4/sq mi (458.09/km^{2})
- Time zone: UTC−7 (Mountain (MST))
  - Summer (DST): UTC−6 (MDT)
- ZIP codes: 87544, 87547
- Area code: 505
- FIPS code: 35-42320
- GNIS feature ID: 2408132

Los Alamos (Spanish: Los Álamos, meaning 'The Poplars') is a census-designated place in Los Alamos County, New Mexico, United States, that is recognized as one of the development and creation places of the atomic bomb—the primary objective of the Manhattan Project by Los Alamos National Laboratory during World War II. The town is on four mesas of the Pajarito Plateau, and had a population of about 13,200 as of 2020. It is the county seat and one of two population centers in Los Alamos County; the other is White Rock.

== Toponym ==
Los Alamos is a Spanish place name that typically refers to poplar or cottonwood trees. Alternatively, Los Alamos could refer to the large groves of quaking aspen that intersperse the coniferous forest on the mountainsides above the townsite, where they are distinctly visible in the autumn due to their spectacular autumn colors.

== History ==
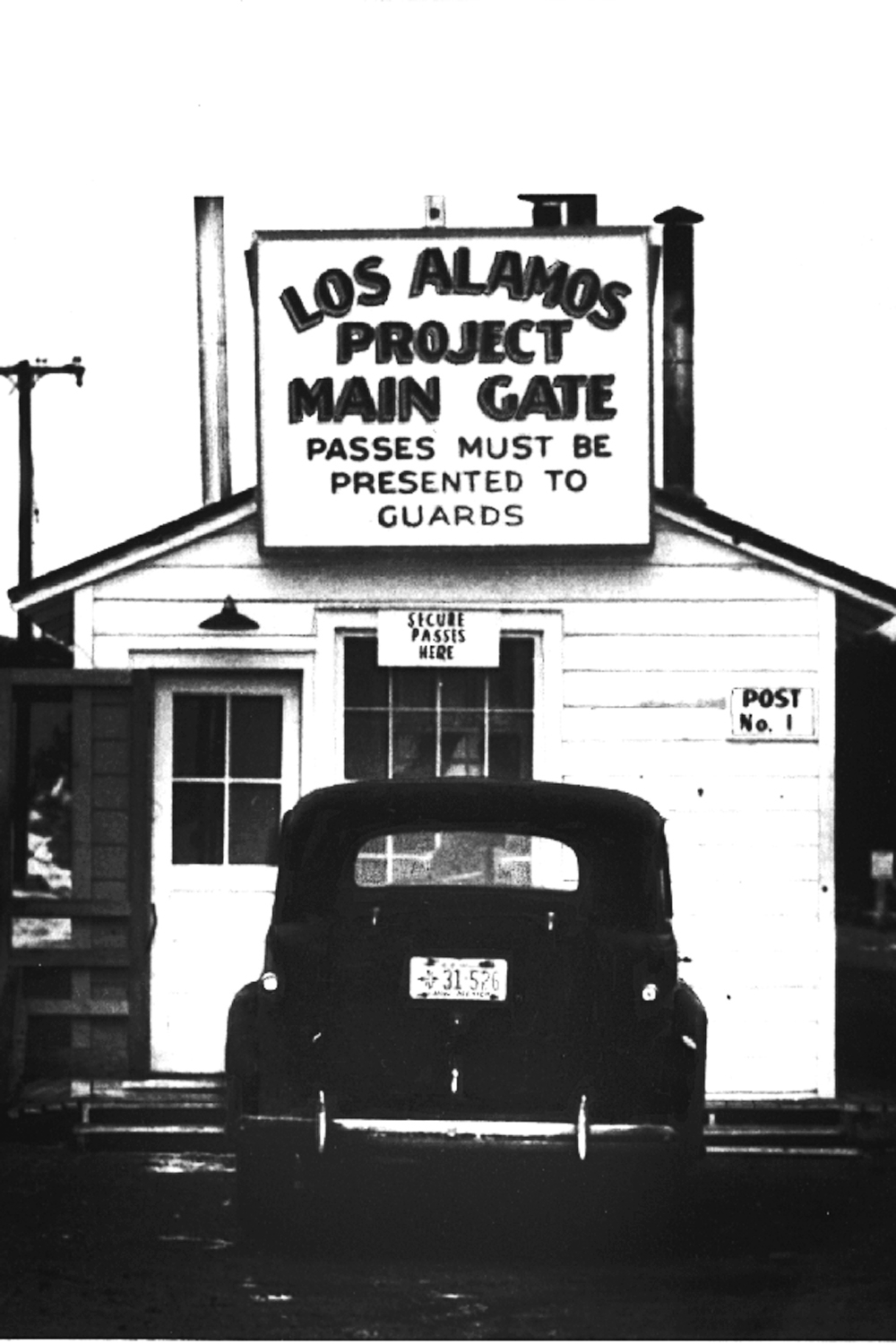
The entrance to Los Alamos was guarded at the Main Gate during the Manhattan Project.

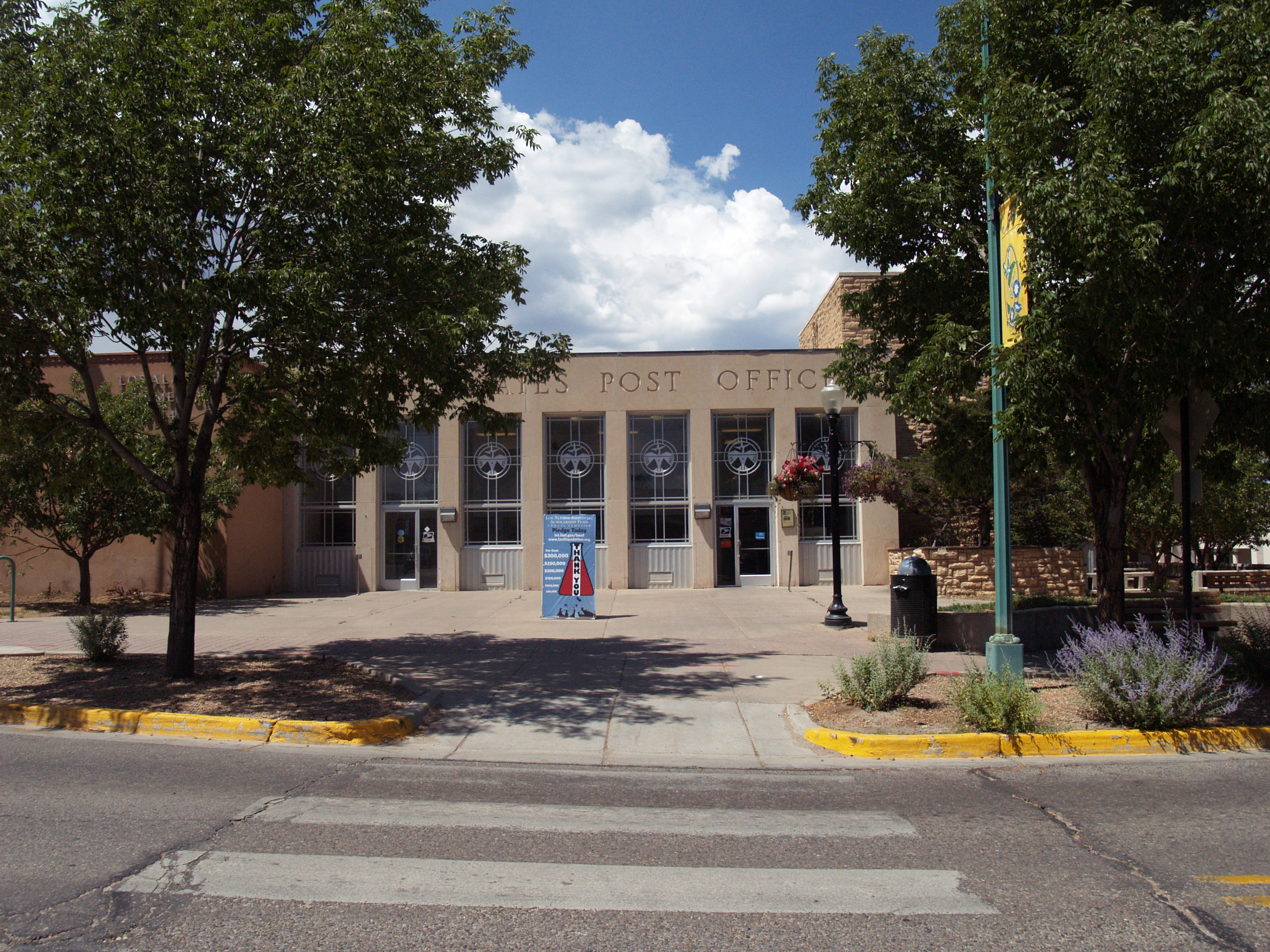
Los Alamos post office, built in 1948

The ruins of Puebloan settlements, such as those in nearby Bandelier National Monument and Tsankawi, and numerous other sites such as cliff dwellings indicate that the area has been inhabited during various eras since around 1150 AD. The first settlers on the plateau are thought to be Keres-speaking Native Americans around the 10th century. Around 1300, Tewa settlers immigrated from the Four Corners Region and built large cities but were driven out within 50 years by Navajo and Apache raids and by drought.

In the late 19th century, homesteaders used the land for ranching. About 1899, a road had been blasted up one of the canyons onto the Pajarito Plateau from Buckman (on the narrow-gauge Chili Line railroad) for the harvesting of timber, which in turn made the Plateau more accessible. Homesteaders built simple log cabins that they lived in only during warm weather to feed livestock. Many of the homesteaders later moved down to the warmer Rio Grande Valley. In 1917, homesteader Harold H. Brook sold part of his land and buildings to Ashley Pond II, a businessman from Detroit who founded the Los Alamos Ranch School. The area was used to teach young men basic ranching and other outdoor survival skills.

In 1943, during World War II, the United States Department of War exercised eminent domain over the Ranch School and all remaining homesteads in the area so that the relatively isolated location could be used for the secretive Manhattan Project, which developed the first nuclear weapons. Facilities for research and development were quickly built and scientists and engineers from all over the world were assigned to the project; all information about the town and project was held secret from the public. Los Alamos was referred to under the code name "Site Y" by military personnel and was known only as "The Hill" by many in nearby Santa Fe.

Los Alamos was originally built as a closed city accessible from the outside world only through two gates. The project's location was a tightly guarded secret. All employees recruited to work at Los Alamos were given a memorandum instructing them to travel to Santa Fe and report to the U.S. Army Corps of Engineers office at 109 East Palace Avenue. There, Dorothy McKibbin gave newcomers the necessary documentation to get through security checkpoints (initially, letters signed by J. Robert Oppenheimer, and later security passes), along with specific directions to the Hill. The project was further concealed by using the mailing address PO Box 1663, Santa Fe, N.M. All incoming truckloads were falsely labeled as common items to conceal the nature of their contents, and military officials censored outbound correspondence by those working and living in Los Alamos.

Not until after the bombing of Hiroshima in 1945 was information about the Manhattan Project released to the public, announced by the White House at 11 am on 6 August. A set of press releases were given out over three days.

In the years after World War II, the laboratory was formally established as a research government facility under the civilian control of the U.S. Atomic Energy Commission, and is now known as Los Alamos National Laboratory. In 1957, the AEC pulled back the security perimeter to the laboratory and opened up the town to visits by the general public. The first visitor to enter the town that year without a permit from the federal government was New Mexico Governor Edwin L. Mechem. The AEC was later succeeded by the U.S. Department of Energy.

Los Alamos served as the setting for much of the 2023 film Oppenheimer, but mostly for interior scenes. The town's appearance had changed drastically since the 1940s, so the filmmakers arranged for the construction of a set based on 1940s-era Los Alamos at Ghost Ranch and filmed exterior scenes there.

== Geography ==
Los Alamos is in northern New Mexico, between the Rio Grande and the eastern rim of the Valles Caldera on the Pajarito Plateau, about 35 mi (56 km) northwest of Santa Fe. The elevation at the post office is 7,320 feet (2,230 m) and total land area is 11.14 square miles (28.9 km^{2}).

The Los Alamos Townsite and White Rock are on flat mesa tops known as potreros, separated by steep canyons. This location was chosen for its relative inaccessibility to help protect the Manhattan Project's secrecy.

The town of Los Alamos was built on four potreros—Barranca Mesa, North Mesa, Los Alamos Mesa, and South Mesa—along with the connecting communities at the base of the mountain. Los Alamos National Laboratory occupies half of South Mesa, Two Mile Mesa, Frijoles Mesa, Mesita de Buey, and several nearby areas in the region (in the valleys and at the base of the mountain). White Rock lies at the top of White Rock Canyon.

Much of Los Alamos County is within the Española Ranger District of the Santa Fe National Forest.

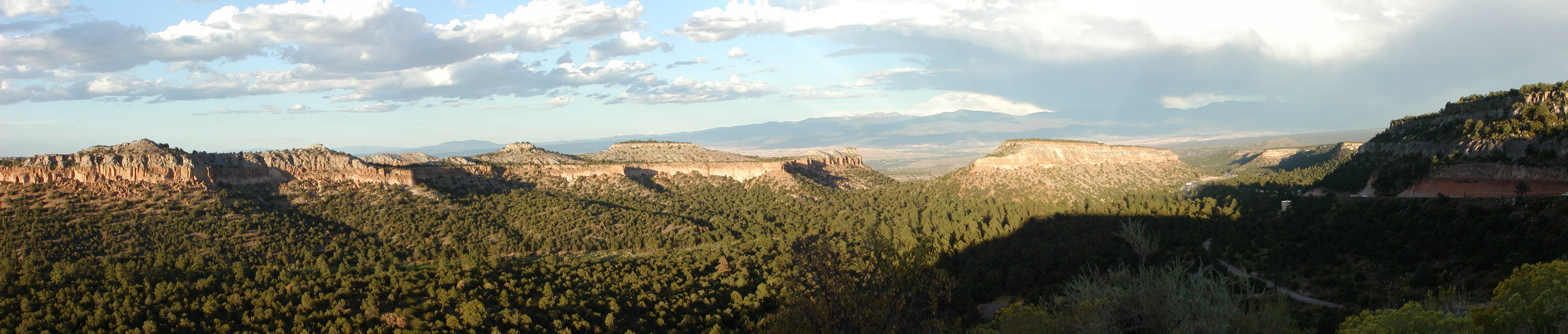
View from the Anderson Overlook.

=== Climate ===
Los Alamos has a humid continental climate (Dfb) with four distinct seasons. Summer days are moderately warm in the 70s°F (20s°C), but reach 90 °F (32 °C) on only 5 days per year on average.

Climate data for Los Alamos, New Mexico, 1991–2020 normals, extremes 1918–present
| Month | Jan | Feb | Mar | Apr | May | Jun | Jul | Aug | Sep | Oct | Nov | Dec | Year |
|---|---|---|---|---|---|---|---|---|---|---|---|---|---|
| Record high °F (°C) | 65 (18) | 69 (21) | 83 (28) | 80 (27) | 93 (34) | 96 (36) | 98 (37) | 92 (33) | 94 (34) | 82 (28) | 72 (22) | 64 (18) | 98 (37) |
| Mean maximum °F (°C) | 51.9 (11.1) | 56.5 (13.6) | 66.9 (19.4) | 73.6 (23.1) | 81.3 (27.4) | 89.7 (32.1) | 90.2 (32.3) | 86.7 (30.4) | 82.7 (28.2) | 74.9 (23.8) | 62.5 (16.9) | 53.5 (11.9) | 91.7 (33.2) |
| Mean daily maximum °F (°C) | 40.3 (4.6) | 44.5 (6.9) | 53.4 (11.9) | 61.0 (16.1) | 70.2 (21.2) | 80.9 (27.2) | 82.5 (28.1) | 79.5 (26.4) | 74.0 (23.3) | 62.7 (17.1) | 50.1 (10.1) | 40.3 (4.6) | 61.6 (16.5) |
| Daily mean °F (°C) | 30.4 (−0.9) | 34.1 (1.2) | 41.5 (5.3) | 48.2 (9.0) | 57.2 (14.0) | 67.2 (19.6) | 69.6 (20.9) | 67.3 (19.6) | 61.5 (16.4) | 50.6 (10.3) | 39.1 (3.9) | 30.5 (−0.8) | 49.8 (9.9) |
| Mean daily minimum °F (°C) | 20.5 (−6.4) | 23.6 (−4.7) | 29.6 (−1.3) | 35.4 (1.9) | 44.2 (6.8) | 53.5 (11.9) | 56.7 (13.7) | 55.1 (12.8) | 49.1 (9.5) | 38.4 (3.6) | 28.2 (−2.1) | 20.6 (−6.3) | 37.9 (3.3) |
| Mean minimum °F (°C) | 4.8 (−15.1) | 7.5 (−13.6) | 13.7 (−10.2) | 21.4 (−5.9) | 30.5 (−0.8) | 42.0 (5.6) | 49.8 (9.9) | 48.1 (8.9) | 36.6 (2.6) | 22.3 (−5.4) | 11.4 (−11.4) | 3.6 (−15.8) | 0.2 (−17.7) |
| Record low °F (°C) | −18 (−28) | −17 (−27) | −3 (−19) | 5 (−15) | 22 (−6) | 28 (−2) | 37 (3) | 38 (3) | 23 (−5) | 6 (−14) | −14 (−26) | −13 (−25) | −18 (−28) |
| Average precipitation inches (mm) | 0.90 (23) | 0.72 (18) | 1.04 (26) | 0.93 (24) | 1.17 (30) | 1.17 (30) | 2.94 (75) | 3.20 (81) | 2.02 (51) | 1.58 (40) | 0.95 (24) | 0.87 (22) | 17.49 (444) |
| Average snowfall inches (cm) | 9.9 (25) | 8.8 (22) | 5.9 (15) | 3.3 (8.4) | 0.1 (0.25) | 0.0 (0.0) | 0.0 (0.0) | 0.0 (0.0) | 0.0 (0.0) | 1.7 (4.3) | 4.4 (11) | 8.0 (20) | 42.1 (107) |
| Average precipitation days (≥ 0.01 in) | 5.5 | 6.5 | 6.5 | 5.5 | 6.5 | 6.7 | 13.0 | 14.6 | 8.5 | 6.5 | 4.6 | 5.7 | 90.1 |
| Average snowy days (≥ 0.1 in) | 3.8 | 4.3 | 2.8 | 1.4 | 0.1 | 0.0 | 0.0 | 0.0 | 0.0 | 0.8 | 2.0 | 4.1 | 19.3 |
Source: NOAA

=== Wildlife and vegetation ===
Los Alamos's wildlife and vegetation are diverse compared to surrounding areas. "The variation in elevation creates precipitation and temperature gradients that support a wide diversity of plant communities". There are six different plant communities in the county; each is home to unique flora and fauna. Ponderosa pine trees are the most common trees at the elevation of Los Alamos (7,000 and 8,000 feet (2,100 and 2,400 m)). Common shrubs in the area include sagebrush, Gambel oak, and wild rose.

Black bears (brown-color variation), elk, mule deer, bobcats, gray foxes, skunks and chipmunks are examples of mammals living in the area. "Over 200 species of birds have been reported" in the Pajarito Ornithological Survey conducted by LANL. Among these are broad-tailed hummingbirds, hairy woodpeckers, zone-tailed hawks, common ravens, western bluebirds, and great horned owls.

==== Wildfires ====
Wildfires have affected the county, but the most destructive to the townsite was the Cerro Grande Fire of 2000, which caused an estimated $1 billion in damages and destroyed more than 400 homes. The CDP was evacuated for eight days. The Federal Emergency Management Agency (FEMA) built temporary housing on North Mesa for those who were displaced by the fire. Though there was no loss of life, other effects include damage to LANL facilities (nuclear material was not affected), flash-flooding, and erosion.

The Las Conchas Fire of 2011 burned about three times as many acres and also prompted evacuation of Los Alamos, but there was no damage to property in Los Alamos. It was the largest recorded wildfire in New Mexico until the Whitewater-Baldy complex fire in 2012.

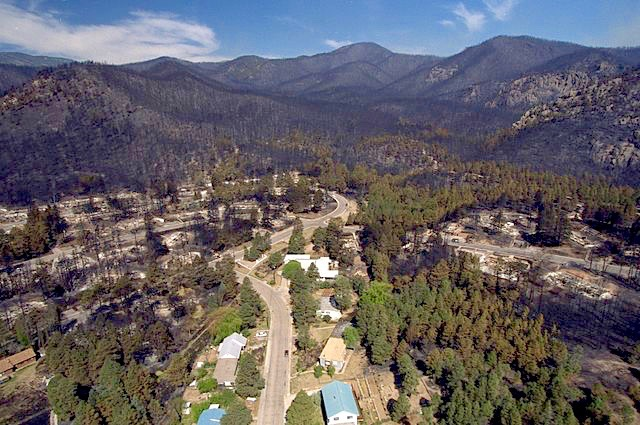
Aftermath of the Cerro Grande Fire of 2000

| Wildfire (year) | Burned area | Cause |
|---|---|---|
| Water Canyon Fire (1954) | 3,000 acres (10 km^{2}) | trash/construction debris fire |
| La Mesa Fire (1977) | 15,400 acres (60 km^{2}) | human-caused |
| Dome Fire (1996) | 16,500 acres (65 km^{2}) | abandoned campfire |
| Oso Complex Fire (1998) | 5,200 acres (20 km^{2}) | arson |
| Cerro Grande Fire (2000) | 48,000 acres (195 km^{2}) | controlled burn |
| Las Conchas Fire (2011) | 156,800 acres (635 km^{2}) | Power line |

Wildfires have altered plant communities in the area. Plant species are migrating to cover burn areas.

=== Environmental remediation ===
Over 2,000 sites in the area have been determined to have been affected by past activities at LANL. These sites have been identified throughout the county, and are primarily (but not exclusively) on DOE property. Contaminated sites vary widely in significance. Corrective action and environmental restoration has been deemed necessary for certain areas; LANL takes part in this process. Some residents have voiced concern about a lack of public participation and opportunity to comment on the cleanup schedule and funding.

== Demographics ==
Historical population
| Year | Pop. | ±% |
|---|---|---|
| 1970 | 11,310 | — |
| 1980 | 11,039 | −2.4% |
| 1990 | 11,455 | +3.8% |
| 2000 | 11,909 | +4.0% |
| 2010 | 12,019 | +0.9% |
| 2020 | 13,179 | +9.7% |
Source: U.S. Decennial Census

=== Racial and ethnic composition ===
| Racial composition | 2010 | 2020 |
|---|---|---|
| White | 85.9% | 73.2% |
| —Non-Hispanic | 74.8% | 67.8% |
| Hispanic or Latino (of any race) | 14.3% | 17.4% |
| Asian | 7.2% | 8% |
| American Indian and Alaska Native | 0.8% | 0.7% |
| Black or African American | 0.6% | 1% |

Los Alamos is demographically unique compared to its surrounding counties and the state as a whole. Over 35% of the population of surrounding counties (Rio Arriba, Santa Fe, and Sandoval) and the state are Hispanic or Latino, while only about 20% of Los Alamosans are Hispanic or Latino. The white and especially the Asian populations of Los Alamos are significantly higher than in the rest of New Mexico.

=== 2020 census ===
As of the 2020 census, Los Alamos had a population of 13,179, with 5,653 households and 3,522 families. The population density was 1,186.4 inhabitants per square mile (458.1/km^{2}).

The median age was 39.6 years. 22.8% of residents were under the age of 18, 6.3% were from 18 to 24, 27.5% were from 25 to 44, 26.9% were from 45 to 64, and 16.5% were 65 years of age or older. For every 100 females there were 102.1 males, and for every 100 females age 18 and over there were 102.5 males age 18 and over.

98.3% of residents lived in urban areas, while 1.7% lived in rural areas.

Of the households, 30.6% had children under the age of 18 living in them. Of all households, 50.4% were married-couple households, 22.7% were households with a male householder and no spouse or partner present, and 22.0% were households with a female householder and no spouse or partner present. About 32.4% of all households were made up of individuals and 10.9% had someone living alone who was 65 years of age or older.

There were 6,026 housing units at an average density of 542.5 per square mile (209.5/km^{2}), of which 6.2% were vacant. The homeowner vacancy rate was 1.1% and the rental vacancy rate was 4.5%.

=== Demographic estimates ===
The 2016–2020 5-year American Community Survey estimates show an average household size of 2.2 and an average family size of 2.9. The percent of those with a bachelor's degree or higher was estimated to be 50.6% of the population.

=== Income and poverty ===
The 2016–2020 5-year American Community Survey estimates show that the median household income was $114,034 (with a margin of error of +/- $9,349) and the median family income was $139,184 (+/- $15,168). Males had a median income of $83,875 (+/- $7,095) versus $57,000 (+/- $11,331) for females. The median income for those above 16 years old was $72,606 (+/- $8,291). Approximately, 3.2% of families and 4.7% of the population were below the poverty line, including 4.2% of those under the age of 18 and 3.6% of those ages 65 or over.

=== 2010 census ===
As of the 2010 United States census, there were 12,019 people with a population density of 1,078.7 inhabitants per square mile (416.5/km^{2}). The median age is 40 years. Of the people, 24.8% are under the age of 18, 4.8% are ages 18 to 24, 29.2% are ages 25 to 44, 28.2% are ages 45 to 64, and 12.9% are ages 65 years or older. For every 100 females, there were 101.3 males.

== Culture ==
=== Notable people ===
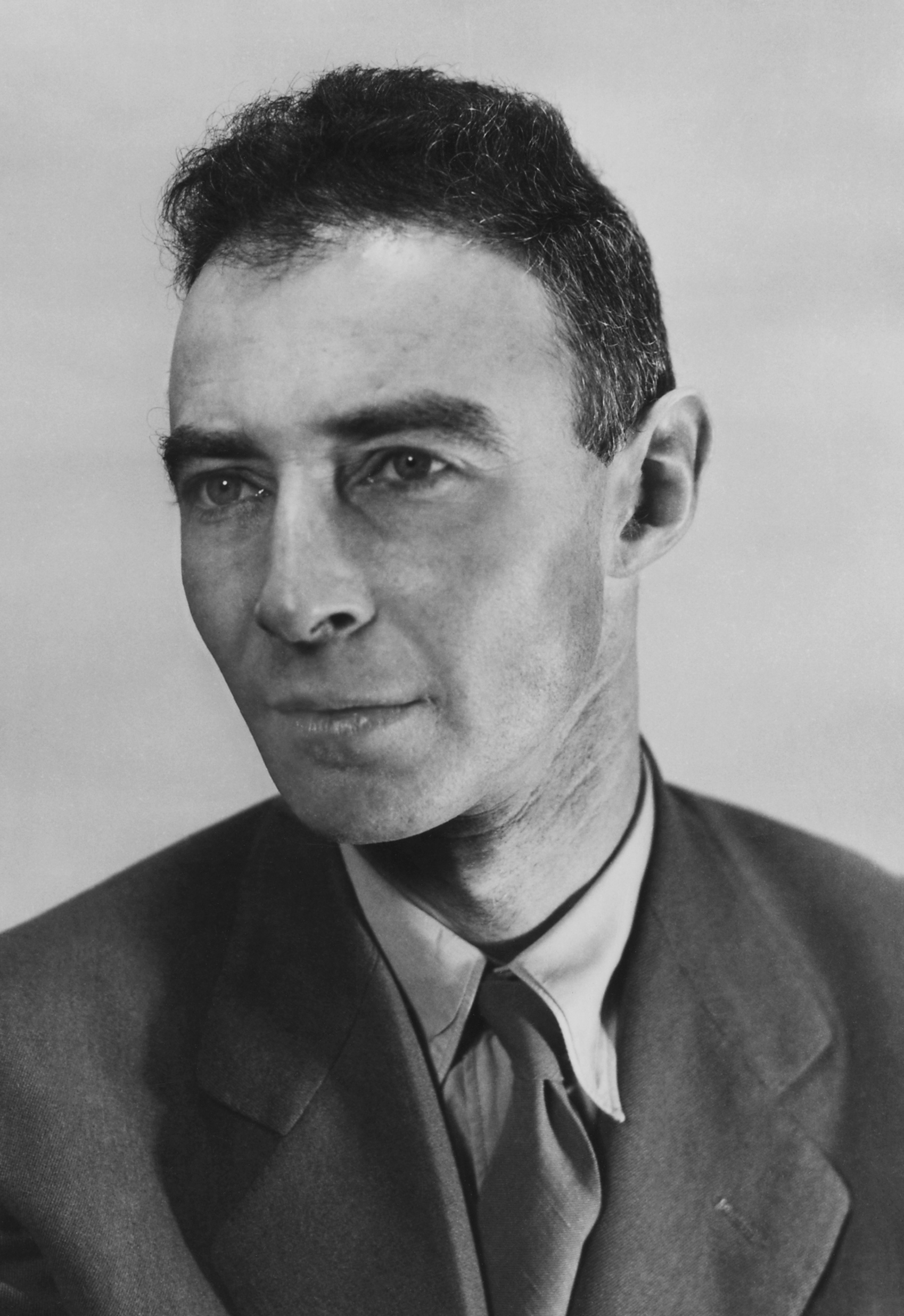
J. Robert Oppenheimer, c. 1944

==== Manhattan Project ====
- Jack Aeby, environmental physicist who took the only well-exposed color photograph of the Trinity nuclear test
- Harold Agnew, physicist and third director of Los Alamos National Laboratory (1970-1979)
- Luis Alvarez, nuclear physicist
- Kenneth Bainbridge, physicist and director of the Trinity nuclear test
- Robert Bacher, nuclear physicist
- Hans Bethe, German-American nuclear physicist, awarded 1967 Nobel Prize in Physics
- Niels Bohr, Danish nuclear physicist, awarded 1922 Nobel Prize in Physics
- Norris Bradbury, physicist and second director of Los Alamos National Laboratory (1945-1970). He remained in Los Alamos for the rest of his life.
- Hugh Bradner, physicist researching shaped charges for implosive devices. In later years he developed the first neoprene wetsuit.
- Egon Bretscher, Swiss-born British chemist and nuclear physicist.
- Robert Brode, physicist, worked to develop a fuse to detonate an atomic bomb at a specified altitude.
- John Williams Calkin, mathematician, worked on effects of shock waves. Returned to Los Alamos 1949-1958 to work on development of the H-bomb.
- James Chadwick, British physicist and recipient of the 1935 Nobel Prize in Physics for discovery of the neutron.
- Owen Chamberlain, physicist who shared the Nobel Prize in Physics with Emilio Segrè for the discovery of the antiproton.
- Robert F. Christy, Canadian-American theoretical physicist generally credited with the insight into supercriticality.
- Samuel T. Cohen, American physicist generally credited as the father of the neutron bomb.
- George Cowan, physical chemist, businessman and philanthropist, participated in founding the Santa Fe Opera; remained in Los Alamos for the rest of his life.
- Charles Critchfield, mathematical physicist. Returned to Los Alamos in 1961 and remained there for the rest of his life.
- Harry Daghlian, physicist, died from radiation poisoning at Los Alamos in September 1945.
- Robert B. Duffield, radiochemist and later director of the Argonne National Laboratory, and his wife, Priscilla Duffield, personal secretary to Oppenheimer.
- Enrico Fermi, Italian-American theoretical and experimental physicist, has been called "architect of the nuclear age."
- Laura Fermi, wife of Enrico and later political activist.
- Val Fitch, nuclear physicist and recipient of the 1980 Nobel Prize in Physics.
- Richard Feynman, theoretical physicist, awarded 1965 Nobel Prize in Physics, shared with Shin'ichirō Tomonaga and Julian Schwinger
- Max Flatow, Architectural Superintendent of Construction for Los Alamos, later established New Mexico's largest architectural firm.
- Stan Frankel, mathematician and later computer scientist, who helped develop computational techniques used in nuclear research.
- Anthony French, British-born physicist, later director of studies in natural sciences at Pembroke College, Oxford, and his wife, Naomi Livesay, American mathematician working for Feynman's theoretical group
- Gerhart Friedlander, German-born nuclear chemist.
- David H. Frisch, American physicist who later became active in the disarmament movement.
- Otto Robert Frisch, Austrian-born British physicist who designed the first theoretical mechanism for the detonation of an atomic bomb.
- Darol Froman, physicist and deputy director of LANL; remained in Los Alamos for the rest of his life.
- Klaus Fuchs, German theoretical physicist and atomic spy who supplied information to the Soviet Union.
- Alvin C. Graves and Elizabeth Riddle Graves, husband and wife physicists. Remained in Los Alamos for the rest of their lives.
- David Greenglass, machinist and atomic spy for the Soviet Union.
- General Leslie Groves, military commander of the Manhattan Project.
- Theodore Hall, physicist, atomic spy for the Soviet Union.
- David Hawkins, administrative assistant to Oppenheimer and philosopher known for the Hawkins–Simon theorem.
- Lindsay Helmholz, physicist and chemist, part of the committee that oversaw the RaLa Experiment.
- Louis Hempelmann, physician who was the director of the Manhattan Project Health Group.
- Joan Hinton, one of the few female scientists who worked for the Manhattan Project.
- Joseph O. Hirschfelder, physicist, worked on the Thin Man and later known for the Hirschfelder-Curtiss variable
- Marshall Holloway, worked with Enrico Fermi on the Water Boiler, an aqueous homogeneous reactor.
- Donald Hornig and Lilli Hornig, husband and Czech-born wife, both chemists. Donald was president of Brown University from 1970 to 1976.
- Donald William Kerst, physicist and developer of the Betatron particle accelerator.
- Joseph W. Kennedy, chemist and co-discoverer of plutonium, later chairman of the department of chemistry at Washington University in St. Louis.
- George Kistiakowsky, chemist and designer of shaped implosive charges. He was also an avid skier who used implosive rings to fell trees for development of the Sawyer's Hill ski area near Los Alamos.
- Emil Konopinski, American physicist of Polish descent, worked with Edward Teller.
- Floy Agnes Lee, biologist who worked as a hematology technician, monitoring Manhattan Project participants.
- Duncan Peck MacDougall, explosives scientist who worked on the Manhattan Project and later served as a Los Alamos division leader and assistant director for weapons
- John Henry Manley, physicist and later executive secretary of the general advisory committee for the United States Atomic Energy Commission. Returned to Los Alamos and remained there for the rest of his life.
- Donald Mastick, chemist, known for a lab incident in 1944 when he accidentally ingested a small amount of plutonium.
- J. Carson Mark, Canadian mathematician, joined the Manhattan Project in 1945 and was involved with development of thermonuclear weapons. He remained in Los Alamos for the rest of his life.
- Maria Goeppert Mayer, German–American theoretical physicist who shared the 1963 Nobel Prize in Physics with J. Hans D. Jensen and Eugene Wigner.
- Boyce McDaniel, physicist and later director of the Cornell University Laboratory of Nuclear Studies.
- Joseph Laws McKibben, physicist and engineer; designer of the air muscle. Remained in Los Alamos for the rest of his life.
- Edwin McMillan, physicist and recipient of the 1951 Nobel Prize in Chemistry.
- Nicholas Metropolis, Greek-American physicist and computer pioneer. Returned to Los Alamos in 1948 and again in 1965, remaining there for the rest of his life.
- Philip Morrison, later astrophysicist who transported the core of the Trinity test device to the site in the back seat of a Dodge sedan.
- Seth Neddermeyer, co-discoverer of the muon, and who later championed the implosion-type nuclear weapon to Oppenheimer.
- James Findley Nolan, obstetrician and gynecologist who was the head of the medical group at the Manhattan Project.
- J. Robert Oppenheimer, theoretical physicist and first director of the Los Alamos Laboratory, and his wife Kitty.
- Deak Parsons, Navy Captain (later Rear Admiral); Robert Oppenheimer's second in command.
- Rudolf Peierls, German-born British physicist.
- William Penney, British mathematician, assigned to predict the damage effects from blast waves; later Rector of Imperial College, London.
- Norman Ramsey Jr., physicist, tasked with integrating the design and delivery of the nuclear weapons; awarded the 1989 Nobel Prize in Physics.
- Frederick Reines, theoretical physicist, awarded 1995 Nobel Prize in Physics
- Robert D. Richtmyer, mathematician
- Louis Rosen, physicist who led the development of the Los Alamos Neutron Science Center. Remained in Los Alamos for the rest of his life.
- Bruno Rossi, Italian-American experimental physicist, who developed diagnostic instruments for development of the atomic bomb.
- Raemer Schreiber, physicist and later deputy director of the Laboratory. Remained in Los Alamos for the rest of his life.
- Oscar Seborer, seismologist 1943-1945, present at the Trinity nuclear test, was an atomic spy for the Soviet Union.
- Emilio Segrè, Italian physicist and recipient of the 1959 Nobel Prize in Physics.
- Robert and Charlotte Serber, husband (physicist) and wife (technical librarian).
- Louis Slotin, physicist and chemist; died from radiation poisoning at Los Alamos in May 1946.
- Cyril Stanley Smith, British metallurgist, later founded the James Franck Institute at the University of Chicago.
- G. I. Taylor, British physicist, worked on the propagation of blast waves and later made substantial contributions to fluid dynamics.
- Edward Teller, Hungarian-American theoretical physicist sometimes called "father of the hydrogen bomb."
- Ernest Titterton, British physicist and later Chair of Nuclear Physics at the Australian National University.
- James L. Tuck, British physicist specializing in shaped charges. Returned to Los Alamos in 1949, researching thermonuclear fusion for power generation, for which he developed the Perhapsatron. Retired from LANL in 1972 but remained in Los Alamos for the rest of his life.
- Anthony L. Turkevich, radiochemist who investigated the separation of uranium isotopes.
- Stanislaw Ulam, Polish-American mathematician. Remained a consultant with LANL for many years after the Manhattan Project, with a home in nearby Santa Fe with his wife Françoise for the rest of his life.
- John von Neumann, Hungarian-American mathematician and physicist, a frequent non-resident visitor working with Stan Ulam.
- Arthur Wahl, chemist, who first isolated plutonium in February 1941. Returned to Los Alamos in 1991 and remained for the rest of his life.
- Bernard Waldman, physicist who flew on the Hiroshima bombing mission as a cameraman; later dean of the University of Notre Dame's College of Science.
- Robert R. Wilson, physicist and a developer of the cyclotron.

==== 1945 onward ====
- George Irving Bell, physicist, biophysicist, mountaineer—worked at Los Alamos
- Irene Beyerlein, materials scientist, born in Los Alamos, and J. R. Oppenheimer Fellow at the Los Alamos National Laboratory
- Sterling Foster Black, lawyer and state senator.
- Judy Blume, author of many books for children and adults, lived in Los Alamos from 1975 to 1978 and set her novel Tiger Eyes there
- Clayborne Carson, civil rights activist and professor of history at Stanford University, grew up in Los Alamos
- Susann Cokal, award-winning writer, attended junior and senior high school in Los Alamos
- Stirling Colgate, physicist, worked at Los Alamos, member of the last graduating class from the Los Alamos Ranch School
- Michael Creutz, physicist, born in Los Alamos
- Mitchell Feigenbaum, chaos theorist
- Burt Freeman, physicist, later worked to design and develop a nuclear powered spaceship with Project Orion
- James Glimm, American mathematician and physicist, founder of constructive quantum field theory, winner of National Medal of Science, and researcher at Los Alamos National Laboratory.
- Kolinda Grabar-Kitarović, former president of Croatia (2015-2020); graduated from Los Alamos High School in 1986
- Brooke Green, member of the Idaho House of Representatives
- Wen Ho Lee, Taiwanese-American scientist and mechanical engineer, indicted on charges of stealing secrets about the U.S. nuclear arsenal for the People's Republic of China.
- Michelle Lujan Grisham, current governor of New Mexico and former U.S. congresswoman, born in Los Alamos
- Ed Grothus, machinist and technician at LANL, later peace and anti-nuclear activist and proprietor of the Los Alamos Sales Company, known as "The Black Hole"
- Jane Hamilton Hall, physicist who oversaw the construction and start-up of the Clementine nuclear reactor; she became assistant director of LANL in 1958.
- Kevin R. Johnson, former CEO of Starbucks and Juniper Networks, former Group VP at Microsoft; graduated from Los Alamos High School in 1978
- Vernon Kerr; scientist and politician
- Bette Korber, computational biologist at LANL, focusing on molecular biology and population genetics of the HIV virus.
- Tom Lehrer, musician, singer-songwriter, satirist and mathematician, worked briefly as a researcher with Stan Ulam in 1952.
- Howard O. McMahon, Canadian-born American electrical engineer, inventor of the Gifford-McMahon cryocooler, worked in Los Alamos during development of the H-bomb.
- Jack Roland Murphy, jewel thief, briefly a Los Alamos resident as a child.
- John Pasta, American computational physicist known for the Fermi–Pasta–Ulam–Tsingou experiment.
- Mary Tsingou, American physicist and mathematician, one of the first programmers on the MANIAC computer.
- Alexandr Wang, AI entrepreneur, born in Los Alamos and graduated from Los Alamos High School
- Emily Willbanks, scientist who made advances in mathematics, computing, and data systems for defense weapons and high-performance storage systems. Remained in Los Alamos for the rest of her life.

=== Sports and recreation ===
Los Alamos's geography lends itself to several sports and recreational activities. There is an extensive system of trails in the canyons and into the mountains above the town, catering to all skill levels of running, hiking and mountain biking. The Aquatic Center is an indoor, Olympic-length public swimming pool with a therapy pool and lazy river. A public 18-hole golf course (par 72, 6500 yards) has existed since 1947.

Winter sports include skiing at the community-owned Pajarito Mountain Ski Area on 10,440 ft. Pajarito Mountain between November and April. The county maintains New Mexico's only refrigerated, NHL regulation, outdoor ice skating rink on the sun-shaded floor of Los Alamos Canyon, almost beneath the Omega Bridge. A rink has existed here since the Ranch School days. Snowshoeing and cross-country skiing are possible at Valles Caldera National Preserve and other locations.

Los Alamos hosts several sporting events:

- Tour de Los Alamos (road cycling race)
- Pajarito Punishment (mountain-biking race)
- Los Alamos Triathlon (Los Alamos Junior Triathlon)
- Jemez Mountain Trail Run

In 2015, the National Park Service and the U.S. Department of Energy announced the establishment of Manhattan Project National Historical Park in Los Alamos, along with units in Hanford, Washington and Oak Ridge, Tennessee.

=== In popular culture ===
==== Film ====
- Director Christopher Nolan shot scenes from Oppenheimer in Los Alamos in March 2022, filming at locations including the historic Fuller Lodge, Oppenheimer's house, Civilian's Women's Dormitory, and United Church. The production sought approximately 450 local background talent for the film, including real local scientists.
- Ian Donnelly, a character played by Jeremy Renner in the 2016 film Arrival, is a theoretical physicist from Los Alamos.
- Tiger Eyes is a 2012 film based on Judy Blume's 1981 young adult novel of the same name. This was the first major motion picture adaptation of any of Blume's books, which have sold more than 82 million copies in 41 countries. Several outdoor scenes were shot in and around Los Alamos.
- The 1988 comedy buddy film Twins begins in a genetics laboratory in Los Alamos, and revisits it later. It includes a few outdoor scenes in the city.
- The 2010 vampire film Let Me In was filmed mostly in and around Los Alamos High School. LAHS students and the surrounding community participated as extras in the cast.
- The Atomic City is a 1952 American film noir spy thriller film about H-bomb secrets that was the first feature film shot in Los Alamos, during the period that the community was still closed to the public at large. Scenes include the East Gate and its tower (some inside the building), and documentary footage of laboratory interiors, with workers' faces redacted. Filming was also done at the nearby Puye Cliff Dwellings.

==== Television ====
- Manhattan, two series aired in 2014–15 about life in the city during Project Y. Not intended to be historically accurate but inspired by its history, with mostly fictional characters, though it does reference historical persons.

== Education ==
Los Alamos Public Schools provides public Kindergarten through high school education (5 elementary schools, 1 middle school, and 1 high school: Los Alamos High School). The graduation rate, as of 2021, is 93.3%, in comparison to New Mexico's 76.9% rate and America's average rate of 85%.

The University of New Mexico has a branch campus in Los Alamos.

== Economy ==
Los Alamos is the fifth-fastest-growing city in New Mexico, after Albuquerque, Rio Rancho, Las Cruces, and Ruidoso.

=== Income and poverty ===
The median household income in Los Alamos is $98,458, and per capita income is $54,067. Income is significantly higher than the rest of New Mexico. Los Alamos has the highest millionaire concentration of any US city, with 12.4% of households having at least $1 million in assets. This is a result of chemists, engineers, and physicists working at LANL since the Manhattan Project. Only 6.6% of people are below the poverty line, one-third the rate of New Mexico. As of 2015, there were no homeless people.

=== Families and housing ===
There are 5,249 households and an average household size of 2.23 people. There are 5,863 housing units, and the median value of owner-occupied housing units is $281,500. Median gross rent is $921.

31.4% of households have children under the age of 18 living with them, 56.4% are married couples living together, 6.5% have a female householder with no husband present, and 34.0% are non-families. 29.8% of all households are made up of individuals, and 7.6% have someone living alone who is 65 years of age or older.

=== Principal employers ===
Los Alamos National Laboratory is the area's largest employer with approximately 10,500 employees, and is foundational to Los Alamos's economy, with an annual budget of about $2.45 billion. About 40% of the laboratory's employees live in Los Alamos, while the remainder commute from Santa Fe, Española, Taos, and Albuquerque. About 66% of the people who work in the national laboratories commute daily to the lab; some take the Atomic City Transit, Rail Runner Express, use the Park and Ride, or carpool with other employees.

Other major employers in Los Alamos include Los Alamos County, Los Alamos Public Schools, Los Alamos Medical Center, Smith's Food and Drug, Enterprise Bank & Trust, and Del Norte Credit Union.

== Transportation ==
Los Alamos provides several transportation services:

=== Roads ===
Los Alamos is relatively isolated, and can only be accessed from NM 4 from the south and NM 502 from the east.

NM 502 sees significantly more traffic because it connects with US 84/285, which delivers access to several Pueblo communities between Española and Santa Fe. Approximately 10,000 commuters use NM 502 daily. NM 502 begins at Pojoaque, and traverses San Ildefonso Pueblo and the Rio Grande.

Interstate 25 is the nearest major interstate highway, and passes through or near Santa Fe, Albuquerque and Denver.

There are three access roads between White Rock and Los Alamos—Main Hill Road (NM 502), Jemez Road, and Pajarito Road. Since the September 11 attacks, Pajarito Road has been restricted to LANL badge holders for security reasons.

=== Transit systems ===
- Atomic City Transit
- New Mexico Department of Transportation (NMDOT) Park-and-Ride
- North Central Regional Transit District (NCRTD)

=== Air ===
Los Alamos County Airport, on the town's eastern edge, is the county's only airport. The main source of activity is from small private aircraft, with intermittent commercial commuter service.

Santa Fe Regional Airport is a 43-mile drive south of Los Alamos and serves regional flights to Dallas/Ft Worth, Houston, Denver, and Phoenix.

Albuquerque International Sunport is a 100-mile drive south of Los Alamos, and serves most national destinations.

== Health care ==
The 47-bed acute-care facility known as Los Alamos Medical Center is Los Alamos's only hospital and is a LifePoint Health hospital. The hospital provides "complete medical, surgical, obstetrical, pediatric, emergency, and diagnostic services" and employs about 300 Northern New Mexicans.

Medical Associates of Northern New Mexico (MANNM) is a group of medical providers that offers family medicine, internal medicine, cardiology, nephrology, radiology, and endocrinology among its many services.

During the Cold War, workers at LANL were in contact with radiation and other toxins, causing many of them illness. A nonprofit organization called Cold War Patriots provides these workers and their families with information about the healthcare benefits available to them.

== VLBA node ==
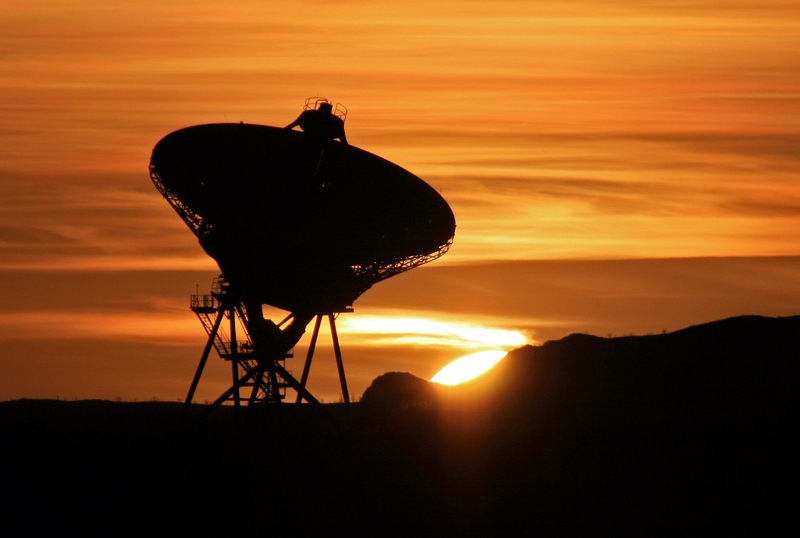

The radio telescope in Los Alamos is one of ten dishes composing the Very Long Baseline Array (VLBA).

== City and regional partnerships ==
=== Sister city ===
Los Alamos maintains sister city status with:

- Sarov (Nizhny Novgorod Oblast, Russia)

=== Coworking ===
In 2016, a collaboration was initiated between the County of Los Alamos, the Los Alamos Commerce & Development Corporation, and the Los Alamos National Laboratory's Feynman Center for Innovation and Community Relations and Partnerships Office to open a private, nonprofit coworking space called ProjectY cowork Los Alamos, which helped create educational programs and resources for entrepreneurs and remote workers.

== See also ==
- Acquiring land for Los Alamos Laboratory
- Bradbury Science Museum
- Casa Mesita
- Los Alamos Historical Museum
- Los Alamos National Laboratory
