= Emily Willbanks =

American mathematician (1930–2007)

- Born: Emily West; November 25, 1930; Fort Lauderdale, Florida, US
- Died: February 18, 2007 (aged 76); Los Alamos, New Mexico
- Education: B.S. degree from Duke University and Master's degree from the University of New Mexico
- Occupations: Mathematician, Physicist, Computer Scientist
- Employer: Los Alamos National Laboratory
- Known for: Work in weapons applications and high performance and data storage systems
- Spouse: Eugene Willbanks
- Parents: Frank M. West (father); Mary M. West (mother)

Emily Willbanks (born Emily West, November 25, 1930 – February 18, 2007) was a scientist at the Los Alamos National Laboratory from 1954–1990. She made advancements in the fields of mathematics, computing, and data systems. She used her background in physics and mathematics to contribute to defense weapons and high-performance storage systems at Los Alamos. She was instrumental in the advancement of a major weather centre in England, was involved in many classified projects for the government, and revolutionized the mass data storage system.

== Life ==
=== Early years and education ===
Emily West was born on November 25, 1930, in Fort Lauderdale, Florida. Her father, Frank M. West, was the superintendent for a private beach estate, and her mother was a homemaker. She was their only child. West attended the public high school. From a young age she expressed great interest in mathematics and science. West studied science at Duke University beginning in 1948. After her first year she received a scholarship for academic excellence and was the sole female physics major in her graduating class. She earned a B.S. in math and physics in 1952. She continued her education at the University of New Mexico where she completed a master's degree in physics in 1957.

=== Early career ===
West worked as an engineering aide in mathematics at Pratt & Whitney Aircraft Co from 1952 to 1954. Her work there involved hand calculations of heat flow and fluid dynamics for a feasibility study on nuclear-powered aircraft, in partnership with General Electric.

=== Los Alamos National Laboratory ===
West began working at the Los Alamos National Laboratory in 1954. While at Los Alamos National Laboratory her initial work involved hand calculations. This evolved into working with the MANIAC I computer for weapons applications. She continued working in the weapons division until the early seventies. She worked under Roger Lazarus in the Computer Division at Los Alamos National Laboratory until she retired in 1990. Her work in the computing department involved the design and maintenance of computer storage, including a project to design a clustered file system. Her work for this project included software development and computerizing weapons data. She adapted the same software in an English weather center database, the Meteorological Archival and Retrieval System.

=== Personal life ===
West met Eugene Willbanks at Los Alamos. At the time, she was working in the weapons department while Eugene worked in the computing division. They married in 1959, but had no children. Her husband died from a brain tumour in 1994. Emily Willbanks died on February 18, 2007, in Los Alamos, New Mexico.

== Legacy and major projects ==
=== Weapons applications ===
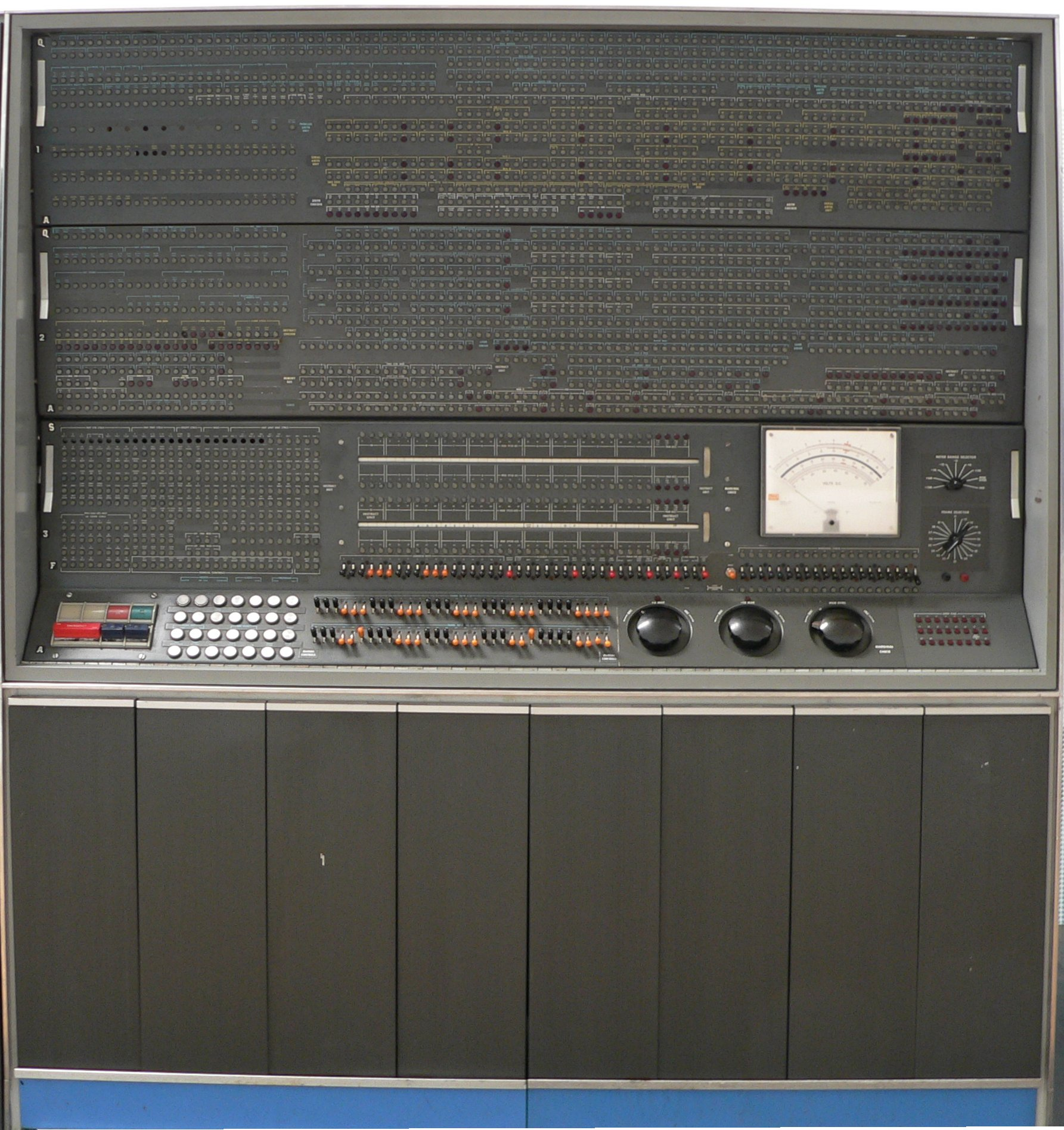
IBM 7030 Stretch Computer

At the Los Alamos National Laboratory (LANL), Willbanks (née West) and a group of five or six others used their pre-written code to analyze weapons that were designed by the engineers at LANL. Their analysis produced data from simulated explosions and provided feedback to the engineers to develop more effective designs. This task required coding skills over analytical skills. Willbanks played a key role in charting and analyzing the trends in the data to ensure that it was correct. This work allowed weapon designs to be streamlined to varying parameters and enabled testing simulations to produce different yields for the different designs. Most of the codes during this time were done on the IBM machine called Stretch. While this project relied more on mathematics and computing, Willbank's background in physics allowed her to adapt the terminology and concepts.

=== Data storage system ===
After working in the weapons department at the Los Alamos National Laboratory (LANL), Willbanks began working on a project to improve their data storage systems. This improvement was crucial because LANL could not purchase needed storage systems from a software vendor at the time. With a team of six or seven, over a twelve-year period Willbanks helped create a high-performance data storage system for LANL called the Clustered File System (CFS). Besides accountability for storing classified information, the challenges she faced in designing these digital storage systems included keeping up to date with the rapidly evolving software and storage systems. Most upgrades in the storage devices required her to develop a new interface so that data could adapt to that technology. The varying needs of multiple users were taken into account when designing the storage systems. Some required the protection of valuable information, while others needed to share data. Along with these demands, Willbanks helped design the CFS custom IBM storage system to organize a variety of information and its security needs. The CFS storage system became commercially available, which led to Willbanks being recruited to collaborate with a weather center in England. Her CFS storage system became extremely useful for bomb calculations, weather data collection, and other applications. The lack of widespread applications and constantly updating storage technology caused the storage system to eventually become unpopular on a commercial scale, but for bomb calculations and weather systems, this storage system remained extremely useful.

=== England's Weather Centre ===
After the Clustered File System (CFS) software was released to the public domain, England's weather centre contacted Los Alamos National Laboratory for help using their software. The centre in Reading, located approximately 40-minutes outside of London, required Willbanks' expertise for regular upgrades and maintenance of the software. Their data were stored on a Control Data Machine, then a Cray Machine, and eventually a Fujitsu machine before abandoning most of the LANL software for a commercial IBM model. Her dedication and work led to the adaptation of the Meteorological Archival and Retrieval System (MARS). This system enabled the acquisition of large datasets from the field including meteorological observations, analysis and forecast fields, and data from the Reanalysis project.
