= Water Canyon Fire =

Wildfire in New Mexico, United States

Coordinates: 35.90°N 106.69°W

- Date: June 1954
- Location: Jemez Mountains, New Mexico

Statistics
- Total area: 3,000–6,000 acres (12–24 km^{2})

Ignition
- Cause: Burning Construction Debris

The Water Canyon Fire of 1954 was a wildfire in the eastern edge of the Jemez Mountains and the Santa Fe National Forest which burned approximately 3,000 to 6,000 acres (12−24 km^{2}). The fire started on June 5, 1954, when the burning of trash and construction debris in upper Water Canyon got out of control. Winds of up to 45 mph (72 km/h) pushed the fire 4 miles (6 km) north before it was contained after several days of work by 1,000 firefighters and a favorable change in wind conditions. The fire was significant for being the first fire to require the evacuation of nearby Los Alamos, New Mexico.

Although most sources list the Water Canyon Fire as occurring in 1954, one document from Los Alamos County (Multi-Hazard Mitigation Plan) lists the fire with a date of 1953, with the smaller 1,000 acre (4 km^{2}) Burnt Mountain Fire as occurring in 1954.

== See also ==
- La Mesa Fire (1977)
- Dome Fire (1996)
- Oso Complex Fire (1998)
- Cerro Grande Fire (2000)
- Las Conchas Fire (2011)

== Sources ==
- Jemez Mountains Fire History
- Multi-Hazard Mitigation Plan
- Fuels Inventories in the Los Alamos National Laboratory Region: 1997
