= Tajique, New Mexico =

- CDP
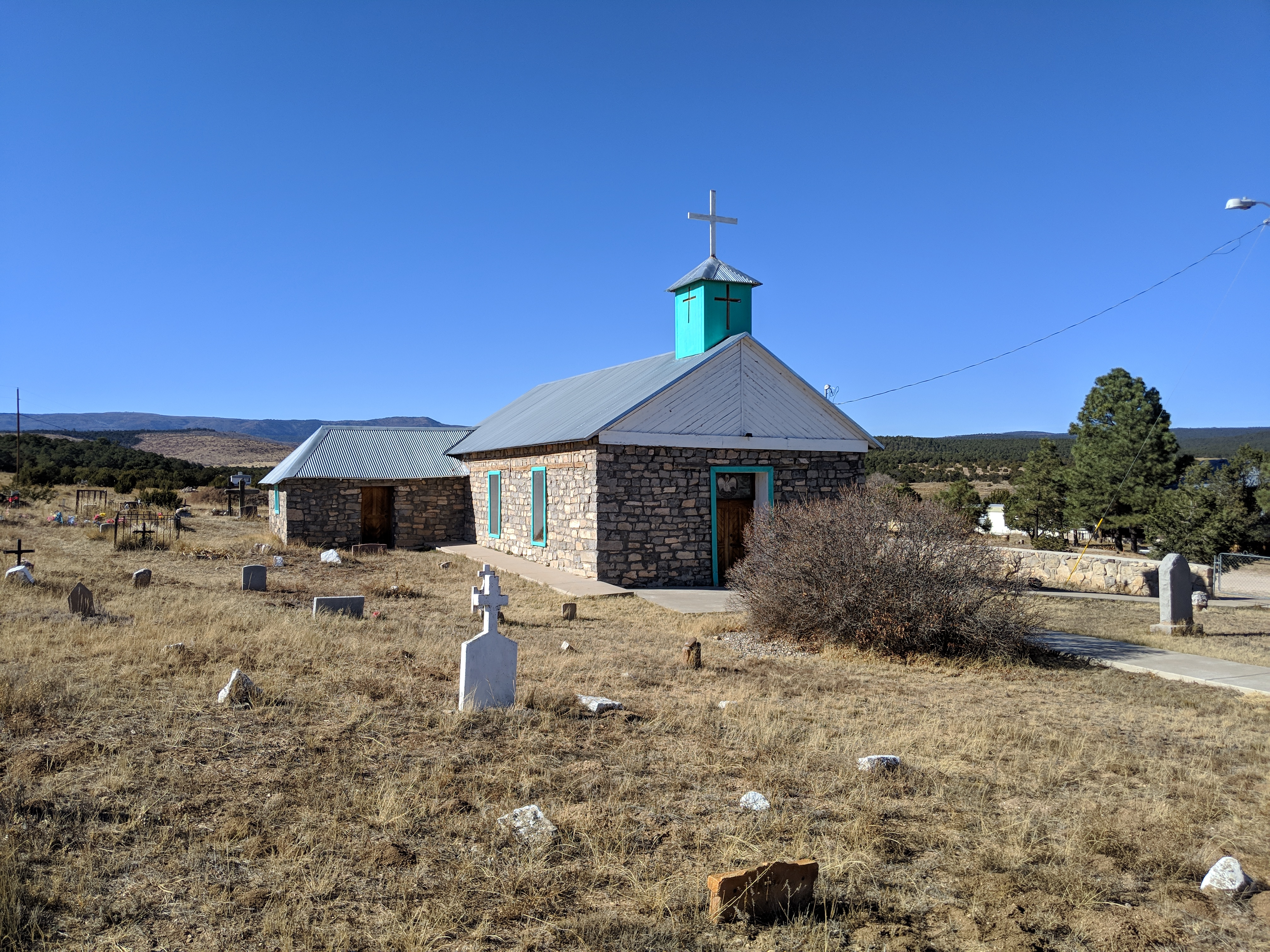
- San Antonio Catholic Church

- Location of Tajique, New Mexico

- Location in the United States
- Coordinates: 34°45′22″N 106°17′17″W
- Country: United States
- State: New Mexico
- County: Torrance

Area
  - Total: 2.70 sq mi (7.00 km^{2})
  - Land: 2.70 sq mi (7.00 km^{2})
  - Water: 0 sq mi (0.00 km^{2})
- Elevation: 6,844 ft (2,086 m)

Population (2020)
  - Total: 106
  - Density: 39.2/sq mi (15.14/km^{2})
- Time zone: UTC-7 (Mountain (MST))
  - Summer (DST): UTC-6 (MDT)
- ZIP code: 87016
- Area code: 505
- FIPS code: 35-76060
- GNIS feature ID: 2410052

Tajique is an unincorporated community in Torrance County, New Mexico, United States. As of the 2020 census, Tajique had a population of 106. For statistical purposes, the United States Census Bureau has defined the community as a census-designated place (CDP). It is part of the Albuquerque metropolitan area.

== Geography ==
According to the United States Census Bureau, the CDP has a total area of 2.7 square miles (7.0 km^{2}), all land.

== History ==
Tajique was originally a Tiwa pueblo. The name Tajique may have been derived from the Tiwa name Tush-yit-yay. The original date of settlement is unknown. In the early 17th century, Tajique served as the seat of the San Miguel Mission. After an Apache raid in 1674, the inhabitants of the Quarai pueblo joined the Tajique pueblo, doubling the population to over 600 residents. In 1675, a subsequent Apache raid forced the abandonment of the Tajique pueblo.

The Trigo Fire in April 2008 threatened the area, and Tajique was later evacuated due to the Big Spring Fire in June of that year. The Big Spring Fire burned 5,478 acres (22.17 km^{2}) and destroyed six homes and 10 outbuildings in Tajique. The Trigo Fire, which came near Tajique, burned 59 homes and charred 13,709 acres (55.48 km^{2}).

== Demographics ==
Historical population
Census	Pop.	Note	%±
2020	106		—
U.S. Decennial Census

As of the census of 2000, there were 148 people, 48 households, and 39 families residing in the CDP. The population density was 54.7 inhabitants per square mile (21.1/km^{2}). There were 63 housing units at an average density of 23.3 per square mile (9.0/km^{2}). The racial makeup of the CDP was 58.78% White, 2.03% Native American, 37.84% from other races, and 1.35% from two or more races. Hispanic or Latino of any race were 79.05% of the population.

There were 48 households, out of which 41.7% had children under the age of 18 living with them, 56.3% were married couples living together, 20.8% had a female householder with no husband present, and 16.7% were non-families. 12.5% of all households were made up of individuals, and 4.2% had someone living alone who was 65 years of age or older. The average household size was 3.08 and the average family size was 3.28.

In the CDP, the population was spread out, with 35.8% under the age of 18, 8.1% from 18 to 24, 28.4% from 25 to 44, 17.6% from 45 to 64, and 10.1% who were 65 years of age or older. The median age was 31 years. For every 100 females, there were 92.2 males. For every 100 females age 18 and over, there were 90.0 males.

The median income for a household in the CDP was $27,969, and the median income for a family was $27,969. Males had a median income of $33,000 versus $32,500 for females. The per capita income for the CDP was $7,645. There were 34.0% of families and 30.1% of the population living below the poverty line, including 34.3% of under eighteens and none of those over 64.
