= Pajarito Mountain Ski Area =

Ski resort in New Mexico, United States

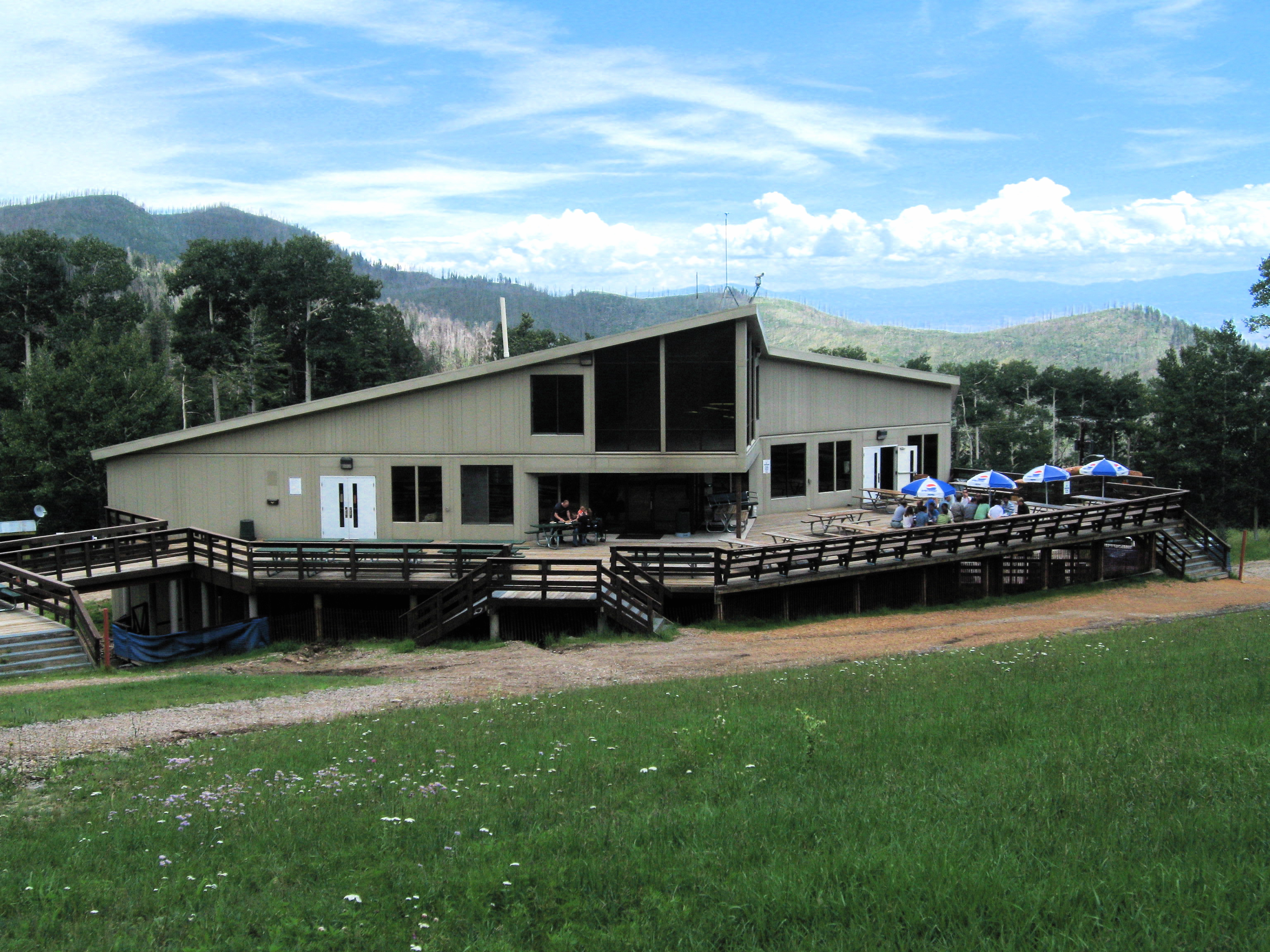
- Pajarito Ski Lodge in Summer

- Location in New Mexico Pajarito Mountain Ski Area (the United States)
- Location: Los Alamos County, New Mexico, United States
- Nearest city: Los Alamos, New Mexico
- Coordinates: 35°53′39″N 106°23′25″W
- Top elevation: 10,440 feet (3,180 m)
- Base elevation: 9,000 feet (2,700 m)
- Skiable area: 280 acres (1.1 km^{2})
- Trails: 40; 20% Beginner; 50% Intermediate; 30% Advanced/Expert
- Lift system: 6 total ( 1 Quad chair, 1 Triple chairs, 3 Double chair, 1 Surface Lift)
- Terrain parks: 2
- Snowfall: 125 in/year (3.17 m/year)
- Website: http://www.pajarito.ski/

Pajarito Mountain Ski Area (Pajarito) is located on the north face of Pajarito Mountain, one of the Jemez Mountains in north central New Mexico, west of Los Alamos. It is located on 850 acres (3.4 km^{2}) of privately owned land. Pajarito Mountain is owned and operated by volunteers and Mountain Capital Partners. A typical season runs from Christmas to early April, but an outstanding season may run from Thanksgiving to late April. Pajarito now has a snowmaking system and it is producing snow. Season passes are available with discounts available for early season purchase.

In summer, Pajarito hosts numerous special events, many involving mountain biking. An extensive network of single and double track mountain bike trails criss-cross the mountain, including a new singletrack trail going to the summit. Pajarito hosts lift access downhill and freeride mountain biking off the Spruce chair, and has continued to do so after the Las Conchas Fire in 2011. There also are hiking trails, and horse riding is permitted everywhere except on the mountain bike trails. Adjacent to Pajarito is a Los Alamos County campground, Camp May; Santa Fe National Forest; and Valles Caldera National Preserve.

== Origin of the name ==
Pajarito means "little bird" in Spanish and was first associated with the area by the archeologist Edgar Lee Hewett who was in turn inspired by Tsirege, which means "bird place" in the Tewa language. Tsirege is a prominent archaeological site located on property owned by Los Alamos National Laboratory.

== History ==
Pajarito Mountain first opened on 23 November 1957 with no toilets, no water, no grooming, no modern lifts and a few short slopes. The Aspen run received a T-bar for the 1962–1963 season. An additional 400 acres (1.6 km^{2}) of land was purchased in the late 1960s and the first chairlift installed on the Spruce run for the 1969–1970 season. A similar two person chairlift was installed on the Big Mother run for the 1976–1977 season. A beginners lift was installed, to replace a rope tow, for the 1981–1982 season, and a triple chairlift replaced the T-bar for the following 1982–1983 season. Construction of the new Ski Lodge began in the summer of 1987 and was finished for the 1988–1989 season. A quad chairlift was completed in 1994 for the Townsight run.

In the summer of 2011, the Las Conchas Fire burned a portion of the ski area. The fire burned ten of the mountain's 44 runs, and damaged two chairlifts. The most significant damage occurred on the mountain's east side, in the Townsight area. Despite fire damage, Pajarito Mountain opened for the 2011–2012 season with four lifts operating and 34 runs open.

== Elevation ==
- Base: 9,000 ft (2,700 m). / 2,743 m
- Lodge elevation: 9,200 ft (2,800 m). / 2,804 m
- Summit: 10,440 ft (3,180 m). / 3,182 m
- Vertical Rise: 1,440 ft (440 m). / 439 m

== Trails ==
- Skiable Area: 280 acres (1.1 km^{2})
- Trails: 44 total (20% beginner, 50% intermediate, 30% advanced/expert)

== Lifts ==
- 1 quad chair lift
- 1 triple chair lift
- 3 double chair lifts
- 1 surface lift (Magic Carpet)

== Facilities ==
- Equipment Rental
- Retail
- Cafe
- Snowsports School
- Ski Patrol: Volunteer, NSP affiliated
