= Salvation Fire =

Wildfire in New Mexico, United States

- Date: June 27 - July 2, 1974
- Location: Gila National Forest, New Mexico
- Coordinates: 33°38′21″N 108°20′49″W

Statistics
- Total area: 26,000 acres (110 km^{2})

Map
- Location within New Mexico

Salvation Fire in the Gila National Forest of southwestern New Mexico burned some 26,000 acres (105 km^{2}) from 27 June to 2 July 1974. It was started by lightning along with some 300 other wildfires, but was one of the last to be contained due to the rugged terrain.

The fire was located some 60 miles north of Silver City and 24 miles east-southeast of Reserve. In addition to local fire-fighting crews, crews came from as far away as Montana. In addition several U.S. Army units were dispatched to help contain the blaze.

The fire received its name from the Forest Service, since it originated near Salvation Peak.
