= La Mesa Fire =

Wildfire in New Mexico, United States

Coordinates: 35.81°N 106.35°W

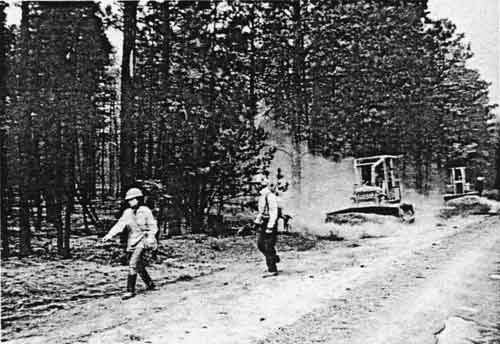
Archeologists precede bulldozers along the fire lines of the La Mesa Fire to identify archeological resources

The La Mesa Fire was a 1977 wildfire on the Pajarito Plateau of New Mexico, in the Southwestern United States.

== History ==
The fire was human-caused (likely a spark from a motorcycle) on the afternoon of 16 June 1977, in Los Alamos County. Before it was contained one week later, the fire burned 15,444 acres (62.5 km^{2}) of Bandelier National Monument and part of the Los Alamos National Laboratory, where it reached K-site and S-site, two facilities used to fabricate and test chemical explosives.

Resources deployed to contain the fire included 1370 personnel, 9 bulldozers, 23 ground engines, 5 air tankers and 5 helicopters. One human life was lost when a firefighter suffered a massive heart attack while fleeing the first major blowup of the La Mesa Fire. A monument near the entrance to Bandelier National Monument honors his memory. A group of 27 high-school students were rescued after becoming trapped in the backcountry of Bandelier National Monument.

The La Mesa fire burned around 60% of the drainage basin of Rio de Los Frijoles, a tributary of the Rio Grande, and increased awareness of the contribution of wildfire to severe erosion. The La Mesa fire was significant for stimulating scientific study of the effects of fire on ecosystems.

== Other Pajarito Plateau wildfires ==
La Mesa Fire is one of several major wildfires in the recent history of the Pajarito Plateau:

- 1954 Water Canyon Fire
- 1977 La Mesa Fire
- 1996 Dome Fire
- 1998 Oso Complex Fire
- 2000 Cerro Grande Fire
- 2011 Las Conchas Fire

== See also ==
- Wildfires in New Mexico
