= Ponil Complex Fire =

Wildfire in New Mexico, United States

- Location: New Mexico, United States of America

Statistics
- Burned area: 92,470 acres (37,420 ha)

Ignition
- Cause: Lightning strikes and drought conditions

Ponil Complex Fire was a lightning-caused fire in New Mexico, United States, that started on Monday, June 3, and was fully contained by Monday, June 17, 2002. The fire burned a total area of 92,470 acres, including areas in the Valle Vidal unit of Carson National Forest and much of Philmont Scout Ranch's North Country. It was the largest wildfire of its time in the state of New Mexico.

The fire wiped out the forest on a large scale. It disrupted the growth and changed the ecosystem of the area. Four fish species were lost due to this fire.

== Origin ==
The fire occurred during a season of increased wildfire in the southwestern United States. Four lightning strikes ignited it. Severe drought conditions fueled the fire.

== Description ==
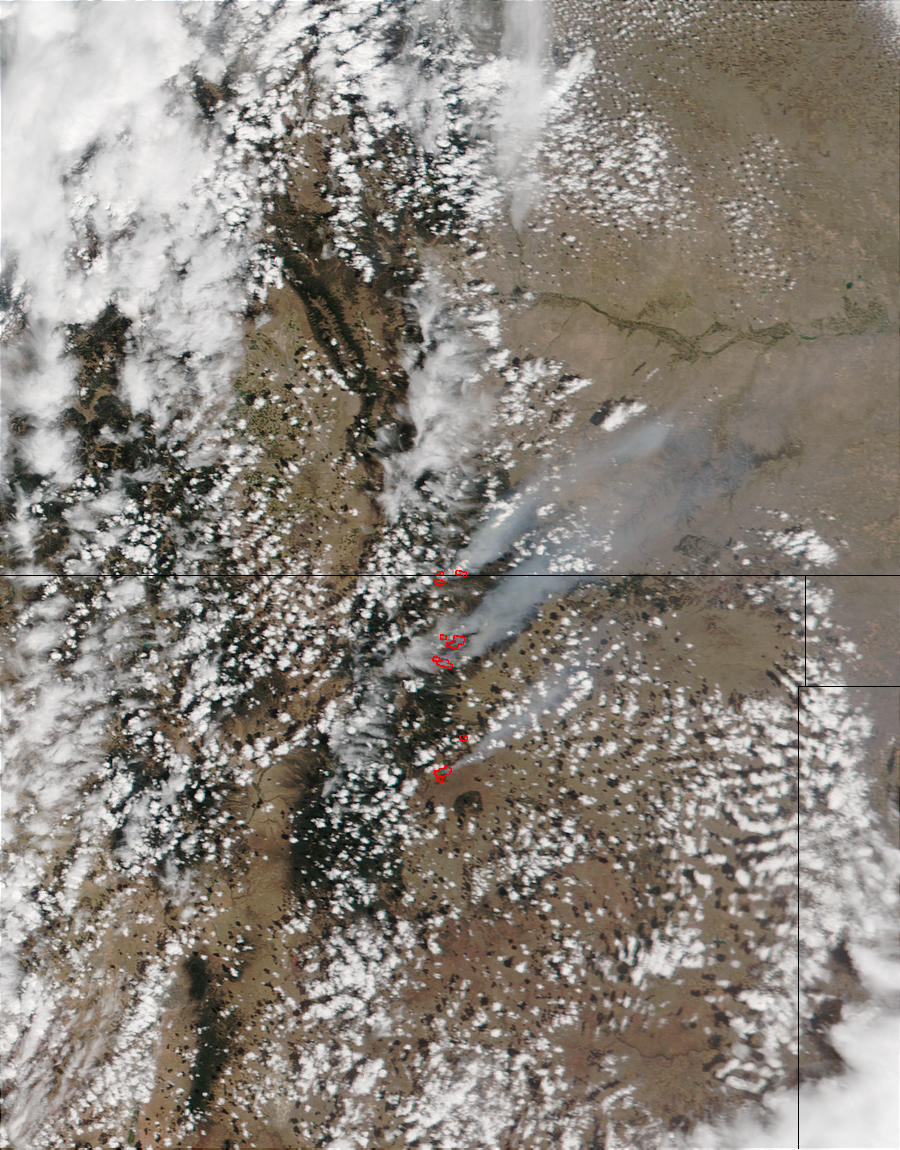
This image from the Moderate Resolution Imaging Spectroradiometer (MODIS) on the Terra satellite shows (north to south) the Trinidad complex at the Colorado-New Mexico border, the Middle Ponil Complex Fire, the Bonita Fire, and the Cerro Pelado Fire.

Ponil Complex Fire started in North County above US Route 64 in the Dean Canyon area and would eventually spread as far as the Valle Vidal area. By June 6 the fire had burned 60,000 acres and was upgraded to a Type I incident with no timeline for containment. By June 11, the fire had burned 85,000 acres of land.

The fire was finally contained on June 17 after burning a total area of 92,470 acres, with 30,000 acres on the Philmont Scout Ranch. 40% of the area within fire's boundary burned at low severity, with 75% survival of the trees. 13% of the area was completely unburned. A total of 1,342 firefighters, 13 water-dropping helicopters, 31 engines, 24 dozers, and 12 water tenders fought against the fire. The total suppression costs amounted to $14 million.

== Impact ==
The fire caused large-scale flooding, excessive erosion, and downcutting in the Ponil Creek watershed. It severely damaged the riparian zone including burning most of the older and mature riparian trees including cottonwoods and willows. The fire especially affected the Bonita Creek watershed, causing increased sedimentation flow into Ponil Creek. The loss of riparian tree canopy caused higher stream temperatures.

A meander was formed after the debris from the fire blocked the main channel. Impaired aquatic habitat was another consequence of the fire. Four different species of fish and more than 2,000 fish were lost due to this fire. Most of the aquatic life in the lower reaches were affected including all of the fish in Greenwood Canyon killed.

Six rainstorms after the fire exceeded the 100-year precipitation event in the Hayman burn area in the Trail, West, Camp, Horse, Fourmile, and Sixmile Creek basins since the 2002 fire.

== See also ==
2015 Philmont Scout Ranch flash flood
