= Cerro Grande Fire =

Wildfire in New Mexico, United States

Coordinates: 35.86°N 106.41°W

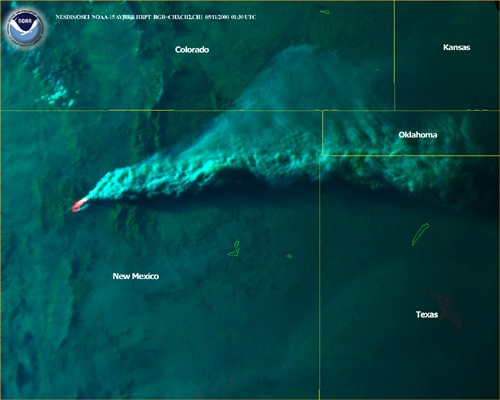
- The smoke plume on May 11, 2000, reaches the panhandle of Oklahoma (NOAA image).
- Date: May 4 – July 20, 2000
- Location: Los Alamos, New Mexico

Statistics
- Total area: 43,000 acres (170 km^{2})

Impacts
- Cost: USD $1 billion (2000)

Ignition
- Cause: Controlled Burn going out of control

The Cerro Grande Fire was a prescribed-burn forest fire in Los Alamos, New Mexico, United States of America, that occurred in May of 2000. The fire started as a controlled burn on May 4, 2000, and became uncontrolled owing to high winds and drought conditions. Over 400 families in the town of Los Alamos, New Mexico, lost their homes in the resulting 58,000 acre fire. Structures at Los Alamos National Laboratory were also destroyed or damaged, although without loss or destruction of any of the special nuclear material housed there. No loss of human life occurred. The US General Accounting Office estimated total damages at $1 billion.

== Prelude ==
Although wildfire is a natural part of the ecosystem of western forests, fire suppression began to be widespread in the late 19th century just as land-use patterns (e.g. intensive grazing) limited the cover that had formerly sustained and been sustained by low-intensity ground fires. High-density stands of small trees and thick underbrush permitted a natural periodic ground fire to leap into a high-intensity crown fire. There followed a century of fire suppression, during which large fires occurred on the Pajarito Plateau about every 20 years: an 1896 fire, several fires in the 1920s, a fire in 1946, the 1954 Water Canyon Fire, the 1977 La Mesa Fire, and the 1996 Dome Fire.

The 1977 La Mesa Fire served as the precedent for how destructive forest fires in the area could be and how compounding issues such as fuel buildup and lack of area survey were ignored leading up to the Cerro Grande Fire. It burned 15,000 acres (60 km^{2}) in Bandelier National Monument, but accelerated a change in attitudes within the National Park Service toward managing fire. On Bandelier National Monument, firebreaks were improved, as were fuel breaks, and in some areas, trees were thinned. The 1996 Dome Fire burned 16,500 acres (67 km^{2}) in nine days and threatened the southern section of Los Alamos National Laboratory.

The Interagency Wildfire Management Team was formed by representatives of Los Alamos National Laboratory, Los Alamos County, Bandelier National Monument, Santa Fe National Forest, State of New Mexico, and Pueblo agencies.

The Pajarito Plateau saw high levels of precipitation throughout the early 1990s followed by a drought in the latter half of the decade. By 2000, conditions were ideal for a major forest fire on the plateau. Forest deadfall had a moisture content lower than that of well-cured firewood. The heavy rains and snows of the mid-1990s had produced luxuriant undergrowth, while the onset of drought toward the end of the decade had increased its flammability.

== Origin ==
The fire originated as a controlled burn that was part of the 10-year Bandelier National Monument plan for reducing fire hazard within the monument. The starting point was high on Cerro Grande, a 10,200-foot (3110-m) summit on the rim of the Valles Caldera not far north of New Mexico State Road 4, the main highway through Los Alamos County. Like many mountains in the Jemez, Cerro Grande was mainly covered with coniferous forest, composed largely of Ponderosa pine, Douglas fir, white fir, and aspen trees, with a characteristic rincon (meadow) on its southern slopes near the summit. This grassy area also represented the headwaters of Frijoles Creek (Rito de los Frijoles), which flows southeast into Frijoles Canyon and on to the Rio Grande, passing en route the main tourist areas at Bandelier. The plan for the burn (see the NPS summary below) called for initial ignition ("phase 1") to be in the rincon, followed by flanking fires ("phase 2") along the slightly higher country east and west of Frijoles Creek. Ignition of the phase-1 burn was scheduled for May 4, 2000.

In the aftermath of the disaster, Bandelier officials came under intense criticism for this plan, and particularly, for proceeding with it in the face of what appeared to be powerful contradictions. Ms Gary Jones, associate director of energy, resources, and science issues at the general accounting office, points out a lack of consideration toward fuel buildup in the park, nearby Santa Fe National Forest, and the thousands of people living in Los Alamos and surrounding communities. The main point of contention was wind. In the springtime, the Jemez Mountains are prone to high winds and low humidity, which often create high to extreme fire danger. Critics insisted that the likelihood of such winds while the controlled burn was in progress was so great, and the risk of resulting loss of control so severe, that the burn should never have been attempted at that time of year. At the same time, Bandelier officials faced a most disagreeable dilemma.

Proceeding with the burn risked disaster if control was lost, as indeed happened. However, not doing the burn might also have been disastrous because the entire southern slope of Cerro Grande was tinder-dry and ready to ignite catastrophically in the event of a lightning strike (hardly unusual in the Jemez in the spring) or human carelessness with fire. The same winds that militated against starting the controlled burn might then have driven the uncontrolled fire toward Los Alamos, with terrible consequences. In any case, the controlled burn was indeed initiated on May 4, and things rapidly got out of hand.

== Timeline ==
- 4 May 2000: Prescribed burn was started in the late evening.
- 5 May 2000: Control lines were burned through on east side during late morning. Wildland fire declared in early afternoon and a type-3 incident command was established for fire suppression.
- 6 May 2000: A fire line was constructed using pre-existing control lines.
- 7 May 2000: Fire behavior became increasingly erratic with spotting by noon.
- 8 May 2000: A type-1 incident management team assumed command in the early morning. Los Alamos National Laboratory, Los Alamos Public Schools and the County all closed for business.
- 10 May 2000: Very high winds resulted in the prescribed fire reaching a mile or more over fire lines to North, South, and East. Los Alamos townsite’s population of 11,000 people was evacuated 1:01 PM. That evening, 235 homes in Los Alamos were destroyed.
- 11 May 2000: The nearby community of White Rock's (7000 residents plus an additional 7000 Los Alamos evacuees staying there), was evacuated shortly after midnight.
- 14 May 2000: The evacuation order for White Rock was lifted.
- 18 May 2000: Los Alamos residents were allowed to return.
- 22 May 2000: Los Alamos National Laboratory began phased reopening.
- 6 June 2000: The Cerro Grande fire was declared contained.
- 20 July 2000: The Cerro Grande fire was declared extinguished.
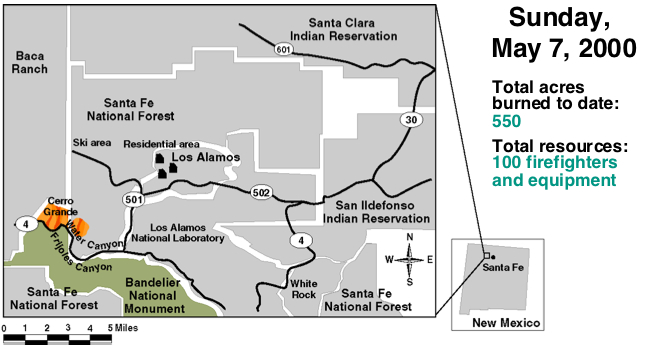
Sunday: May 7, 2000

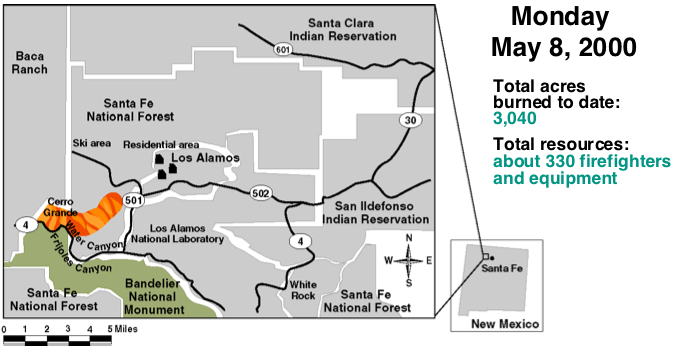
Monday: May 8, 2000

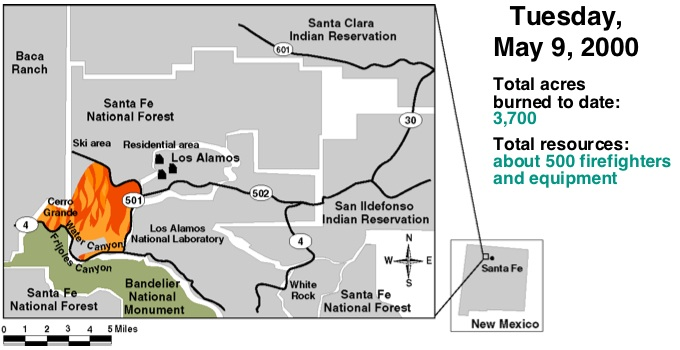
Tuesday: May 9, 2000

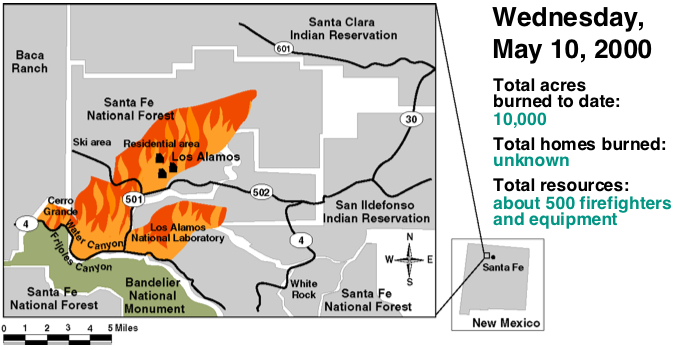
Wednesday: May 10, 2000

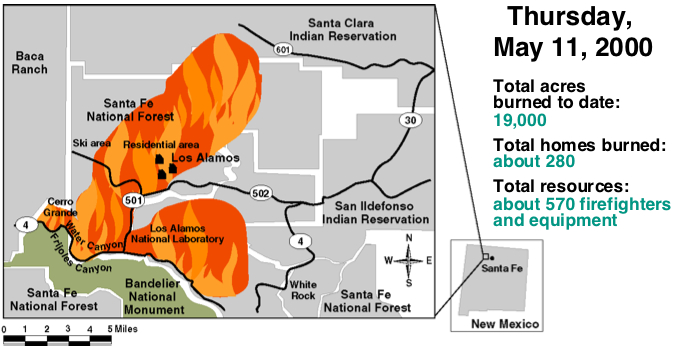
Thursday: May 11, 2000

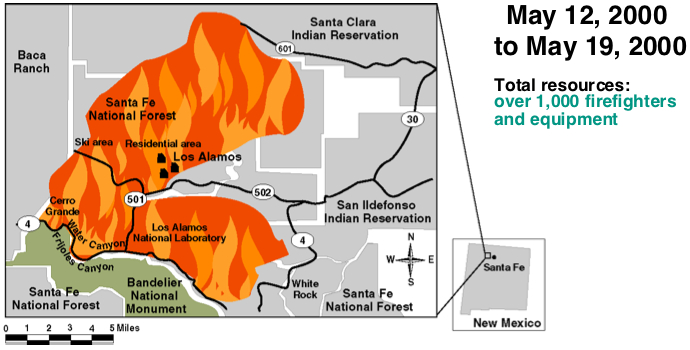
Friday: May 12–19, 2000

== Aftermath ==
=== Flash floods ===
A particular concern was the possibility of flooding in areas downstream from the burned zone. The town of Los Alamos, the national laboratory, and the lower parts of the burned area are all situated on the Pajarito Plateau, an area of extensive canyons and mesas in which surface runoff tends to concentrate in the canyon bottoms. This tendency was exacerbated in Cerro Grande's aftermath because the soil in the burned areas had become hydrophobic, raising the specter of drastically increased water flow in the streams in the canyons that the existing streambeds might not have been able to handle. This concern, coupled with the prospect of monsoon rains that typically begin in about July in the area, made dealing with the possibility of flooding urgent.

The highest priority for flood management involved the Los Alamos Critical Experiments Facility (LACEF), a remote site for conducting research in nuclear criticality safety that housed substantial quantities of special nuclear material. The LACEF laboratories were in the bottom of Pajarito Canyon. A month after the fire, a "short-duration (30-minute), relatively moderate-intensity thunderstorm" caused a brief, heavy flood in this canyon upstream of LACEF. "The maximum estimated peak flow in Pajarito Canyon upstream of State Road (SR) 501 was 1020 cfs, an all-time record for watersheds gaged by LANL on the Pajarito Plateau ..." To protect LACEF, a large, temporary "dry dam" was constructed in the canyon upstream of LACEF to temporarily contain flash floods that might result if an intense thunderstorm happened to rain heavily on the terrain drained by Pajarito Canyon. Runoff was monitored at multiple stations in the headwater streams above Pajarito Canyon.

In the event, the monsoon of the summer of 2000 was not particularly intense, and damage from flooding was generally minimal. No severe flooding occurred in Pajarito Canyon before vegetation upstream had recovered sufficiently, over several years, to retain runoff, and the dry dam eventually was removed. Severe flooding did occur in upper Pueblo Canyon, significantly damaging Diamond Drive, one of the town's arterial roads.

Water quality was monitored by LANL for several years in the aftermath of the fire.

=== Erosion ===
Although flash floods were fortuitously minimal, erosion nonetheless was substantial, and many miles of the 57-mile network of trails maintained by Los Alamos County were severely damaged. Canyon bottoms in particular were clogged with fallen trees and boulders washed down from above. Erosion might have been far worse, had there not been timely intervention.

A Burned Area Emergency Response (BAER) team was assigned to assess the damage and to implement a rehabilitation plan to reduce further natural resource damage. During July 2000, about 7000 hydromulching and hydroseeding flights by air tractors were carried out on 1,600 acres (6.5 km^{2}) of the burned area to reduce erosion and speed revegetation. A local trail work organization, Volunteer Task Force, devoted many thousands of hours to rebuilding trails and planting trees. Local school children made many thousands of "seed balls", which they broadcast in the burned areas to accelerate regrowth of the vegetation. To control erosion mechanically, Los Alamos County work crews laid thousands of trees across slopes, and chipped other trees.

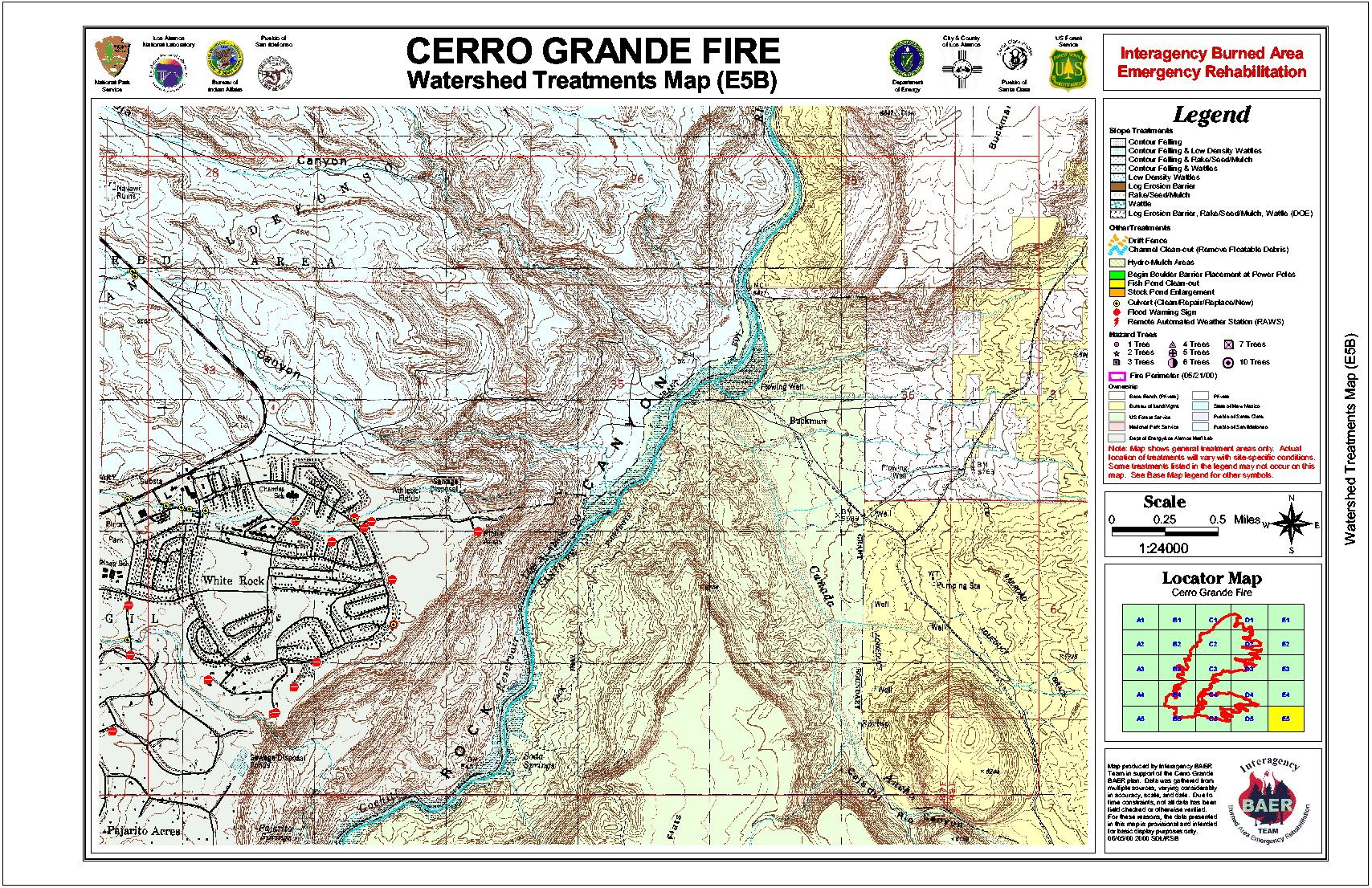
Watershed Treatments Map developed by the Interagency Burned Area Emergency Response team in an attempt to implement a plan for rehabilitation after the fire.

=== Damage to buildings ===
The presence of Los Alamos National Laboratory in and downstream of the burned area posed several unusual problems in remediation, beyond the ones resulting directly from destruction of some of the institution's buildings by fire.

Other problems arose from fire-generated soot that seeped into buildings, shorting out electrical equipment and clogging HEPA filters necessary to the operation of clean rooms at some of the laboratories. Resolving these problems took several years in some cases.

Meanwhile, the Federal Emergency Management Agency (FEMA) mobilized to provide relief to the residents of Los Alamos who had been burned out of their homes. A compound of portable buildings ("trailers"), known locally as FEMAville, was constructed on undeveloped land near the county rodeo grounds on North Mesa, providing housing for hundreds of displaced residents. Some residents complained about the timeliness and thoroughness of the FEMA response. The trailers became available only in late June 2000, after municipal utilities were completed and the trailers were delivered and hooked up to the utilities. By 2006, all the trailers were removed and most of the displaced residents were settled into new homes, although reconstruction of houses in the burned area continues as of 2008. In 2007, the former FEMAville site was proposed as a full-service RV park. This proposal was soundly rejected by residents and the FEMAville acreage remains open space.

=== Adjacent communities ===
Santa Clara Canyon, home to Puye Cliff Dwellings, was devastated by Cerro Grande. The people of Santa Clara Pueblo, who formerly earned income through tourism, now operate the Santa Claran Casino in Española, New Mexico. On June 20, 2000, residents of Isleta and Sandia Pueblos hired four environmental engineers to permanently work with the Cerro Grande Wild Fire aftermath. A 40-member forestry crew with members from the Eight Northern Pueblos has built 3,000 small dams (to minimize siltation of Santa Clara Creek), and planted one million trees on 3,500 acres (14 km^{2}).

On June 21, 2000, the laboratory acknowledged radioactive measurements were 10 to 20 times above background levels but that analysis by it and other agencies still indicated all of the contamination came from natural radiation sources in vegetation that burned, principally from the decay of natural radon. An investigation funded by the New Mexico Environment Department (NMED) and the Department of Energy (DOE) concluded no significant increase in health risk from LANL-derived chemicals and radionuclides released in the air.

== Future ==
In August 2000, a review of the events leading up to the prescribed fire and how it was managed resulted in lessons learned and recommendations for fuel reduction from the US General Accounting Office. The far larger Rodeo-Chediski Fire in Arizona, as well as several other fires in the Western United States in 2002, completed the process of bringing forest fires into political focus, leading to the establishment of the Healthy Forests Initiative in 2003. This initiative remains controversial, and its applicability to the relatively sparse forests of the Jemez Mountains that were consumed in the Cerro Grande Fire is unclear. Clearly, though, significant thinning of the coniferous forest of the Jemez has occurred in the years following Cerro Grande. The evaluation of the aftermath of this fire points to a bigger problem, loss of land to poor handling of natural resources. At the time of the fire, the area of logged forest amounted to 100,000 acres, this in comparison to forest lost from prescribed fires amounting to 2 and half million acres.

The GAO, Government Accountability Office, concluded that suppression tactics used by park service in response to fire were more apparently aimed at following through with the original goals of the prescribed fire and not minimizing the fire getting out of control. The goal is to reduce the build up of dead wood and brush on the ground, called fuels, to minimize the risk of destructive wildfires spreading to surrounding communities. The local community has also taken many steps to prevent and protect against future wildfires, including removing vegetation around buildings to increase defensible space, replacing roof and sheathing materials (e.g. cedar shakes) with less flammable materials, and continued thinning and reduction of fuels in unburned wooded areas in and around town, particularly in the canyons below populated mesas.

Inferno by Committee II, a detailed history of the fire and what went wrong, was published by firefighter Tom Ribe in 2024. Limelight Publishing ISBN p-978-1-326-60543-8.

== Image gallery ==
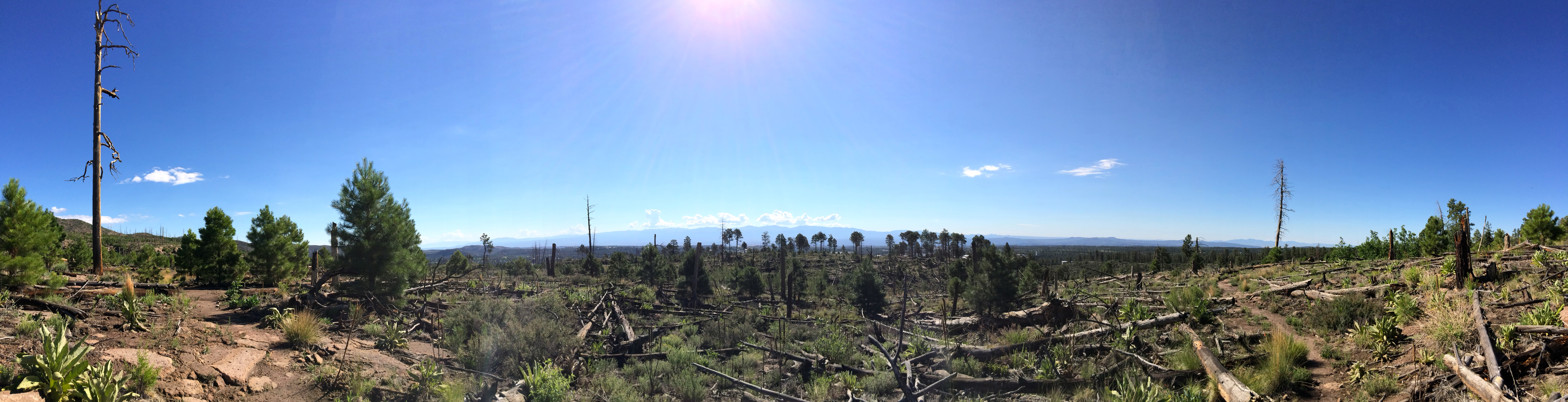
The lasting effects of the Cerro Grande wildfire on the Quemazon Trail west of Los Alamos as seen in July 2014. Scroll to view full panorama.

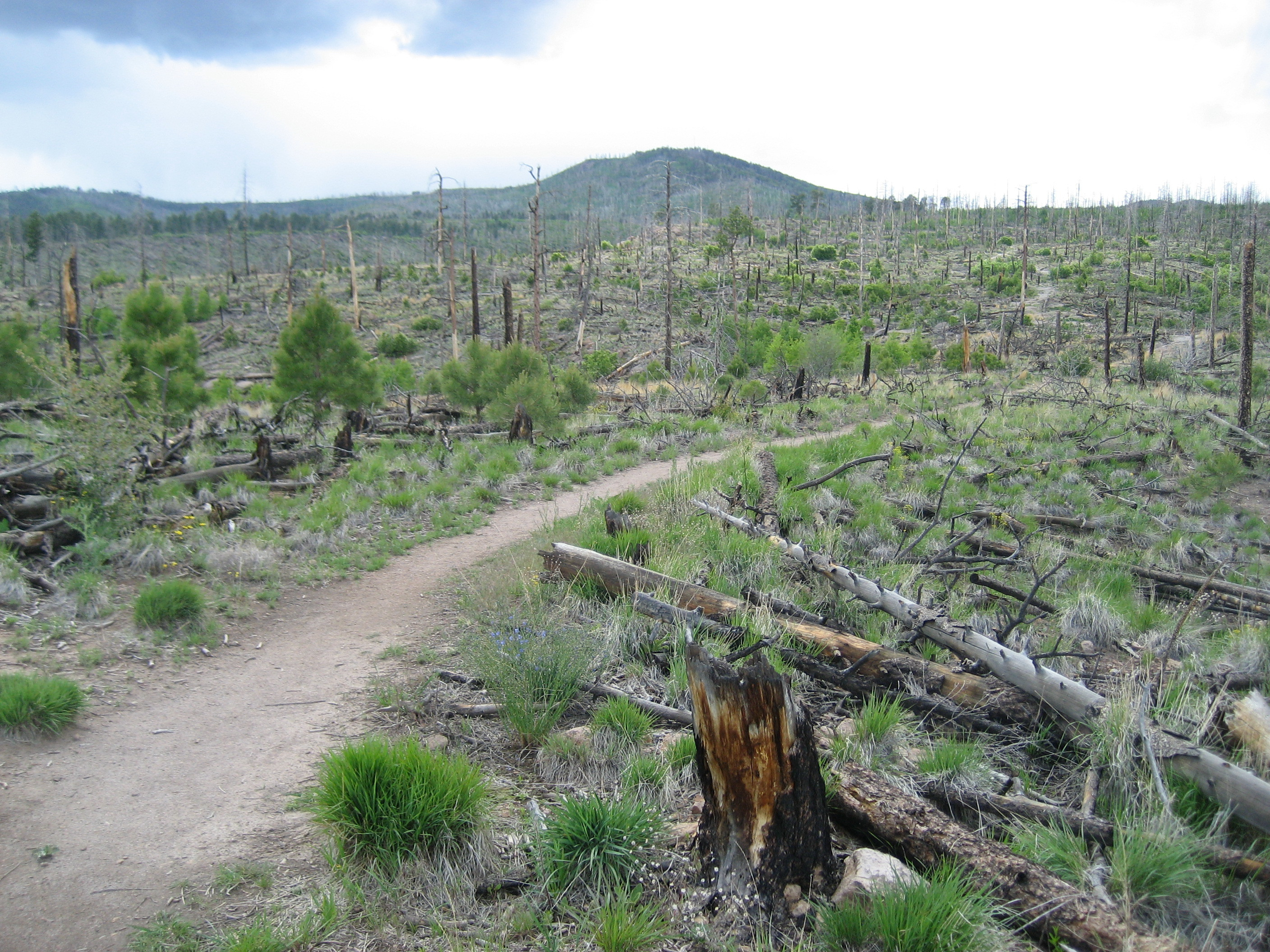
New Growth
