= Oso Complex Fire =

Wildfire in New Mexico, United States

Coordinates: 36.02°N 106.30°W

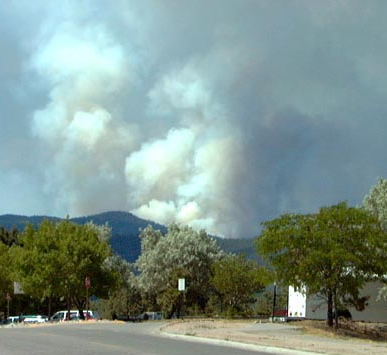
A view of the Oso Complex Fire from the Otowi Building of Los Alamos National Laboratory.

The Oso Complex Fire started June 20, 1998 and burned 5,185 acres (21 km^{2}) in the Santa Fe National Forest in the Jemez Mountains, including more than 1,200 acres (4.9 km^{2}) of Santa Clara Pueblo land. The Oso Fire started in the Santa Fe National Forest in New Mexico on June 20, 1998. The fire initially began as two small fires, but eventually merged and burned through 2,500 acres by June 22, 1998. In total, the fire scorched approximately 5,185 acres of land, with 1,200 of these acres belonging to Santa Clara Pueblo property, one of the many Native American settlements in New Mexico. The fire came within 8 miles (13 km) of Los Alamos, New Mexico and was contained by July 6, 1998, aided by rain. The cause of the fire was determined to be arson.

With fire spreading through the Santa Clara Pueblo canyons, the flames drew increasingly closer to the Santa Clara creek. The creek served as the main source of water for the residents living in the surrounding Pueblo lands and if damaged, could severely affect these communities. Other valuable properties in the canyon, including forest ranger stations and 32 recreational cabins, were also at risk of burning.

The United States Forest Service worked alongside local authorities to amass a total of 808 workers to fight the Oso fire. The Bureau of Indian Affairs supplied a substantial portion of this manpower, consisting of voluntary crews from the Navajo Nation, the Zuni, and the Laguna and Santa Domingo Pueblos. Over 721 of the deployed personnel battled the growing flames via air support, dropping gallons of water and fire retardant from helicopters. After four days of continuous burning, welcome storm clouds dropped heavy rainfall and hail on the northeastern edge of the Oso fire, aiding the crews in bringing the fire to complete containment on July 6, 1998. Burning through the Jemez Mountains in the Santa Fe National Forest, the Oso fire resulted in around $3,500,000 in total damages.

Archaeologists also took special interest in the Oso fire, concerned with the preservation of Native American artifacts in the Santa Clara canyons. Camping alongside firefighting crews, they hoped to find cultural pieces such as old pottery and ancient tools before the flames arrived.

Ultimately, the cause of the fire was determined to be arson. Five months after its initial burning started, Raymond Sandoval pleaded guilty to intentionally lighting the fire as an act of protest. During his trial, Sandoval stated that the fire symbolized his rebellion against Santa Fe government officials, claiming they utilized environmental laws to displace the poorer, Hispanic population by wealthier residents. Pleading guilty, he escaped a possible sentence of 100 years and was instead given 7 years in federal prison.

The Oso Fire was one of the many in the southwest United States, sparking serious debate between foresters. The Forest Guardians, an environmental group in Santa Fe, blamed the Oso fire’s growth on a policy of complete suppression for the past century. John Talberth, executive director of the Forest Guardians, claimed that depriving New Mexico of fires prevented the development of fire resiliency, allowing for initially-small fires to grow out of control. The Forest Guardians advocated for letting wildfires burn, ideologically aligning with the policies that the United States Forest Service adopted in the 1970s. Detailed in Fire in America, the USFS shifted from a policy of complete fire control to tolerating prescribed burning. This drastic change in attitude revolved around a new economic theory; one that recognized the potential productivity of fires, rather than focusing solely on its losses.
