= Dome Fire =

Wildfire in New Mexico, United States

Coordinates: 35.76°N 106.38°W

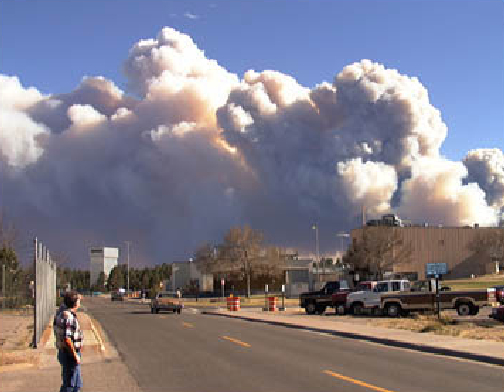
- Smoke from the Dome Fire dominated this view from Los Alamos National Laboratory.
- Date: April 26, 1996 - May 1996
- Location: Jemez Mountains, New Mexico

Statistics
- Total area: 16,516 acres (66.84 km^{2})

Ignition
- Cause: Improperly extinguished campfire

The Dome Fire was a destructive wildfire in the Jemez Mountains in the northern region of the U.S. state of New Mexico during the 1996 fire season. It has been described by forester Bill Armstrong as "a wakeup call that nobody woke up to", anomalous at the time but an indicator of future high-intensity fires that are becoming more common due to both local and global environmental changes.

== History ==
The Dome Fire exploded on April 26, 1996, starting from an improperly extinguished campfire. Two men were later arrested after turning themselves in. Devastating portions of the Santa Fe National Forest and Bandelier National Monument, it continued until 16,516 acres (6,684 ha) in Capulin Canyon and the Dome Wilderness were burned. High fuel loading, low fuel moisture, and wind contributed to the extremely rapid spread of the fire, with flame lengths of hundreds of feet. It became a plume-dominated fire in which huge updrafts pulled burning embers high into the clouds and then collapsed.

The National Park Service and United States Forest Service (USFS) sent in a type 1 incident management team. Resources deployed included 15 fire engines, 7 water tenders, 7 helicopters, 5 air tankers, 4 bulldozers, and at least 800 firefighters. At one point, NPS and USFS personnel had to use fire shelters when their engines were overtaken by the fire.

On May 1, 1996 it was reported that firefighters had used a controlled burn to prevent the fire from reaching Los Alamos National Laboratory. The fire was contained in early May. By May 7, 1996, Bandelier National Monument was reopened to tourists.

== Impact ==
Conditions in the Dome Fire, such as flame length, rate of spread, and type of crown fire activity, were the most severe recorded between 1966 and 2009. The fire was one of the nine largest in the area as of 2009.

The fire had multiple ecological effects including fire-induced acceleration of erosion, landslides, and unprecedented postfire flooding.

There was also damage to archaeological sites in the area. At least 523 identified cultural resource sites were within the area of the fire. Following a review, preservation attempts occurred at 56 of those sites, and materials were removed from 6 sites to study effects of the fire.

The Dome Fire was significant for pointing out the problems of fighting fires on the Pajarito Plateau, particularly the dangers posed by rapidly spreading crown fires. The Dome Fire was the immediate inspiration for creation of the Inter-agency Wildfire Management Team and for studies that predicted further fires in nearby areas such as Los Alamos National Laboratory. Modified fire breaks were later cut along the sides of State Highway 501, which aided firefighters in the Cerro Grande Fire of 2000.

== Recovery ==
The area affected by the Dome Fire has become a focus for studies examining the ability of an area to recover from fire. While the period immediately following the fire was marked by erosion and flooding, there has been some evidence of increasing species richness and recovery in the second decade following the fire, after the risk of flash flooding events decreased.
