= Cerro Pelado Fire =

Wildfire in New Mexico

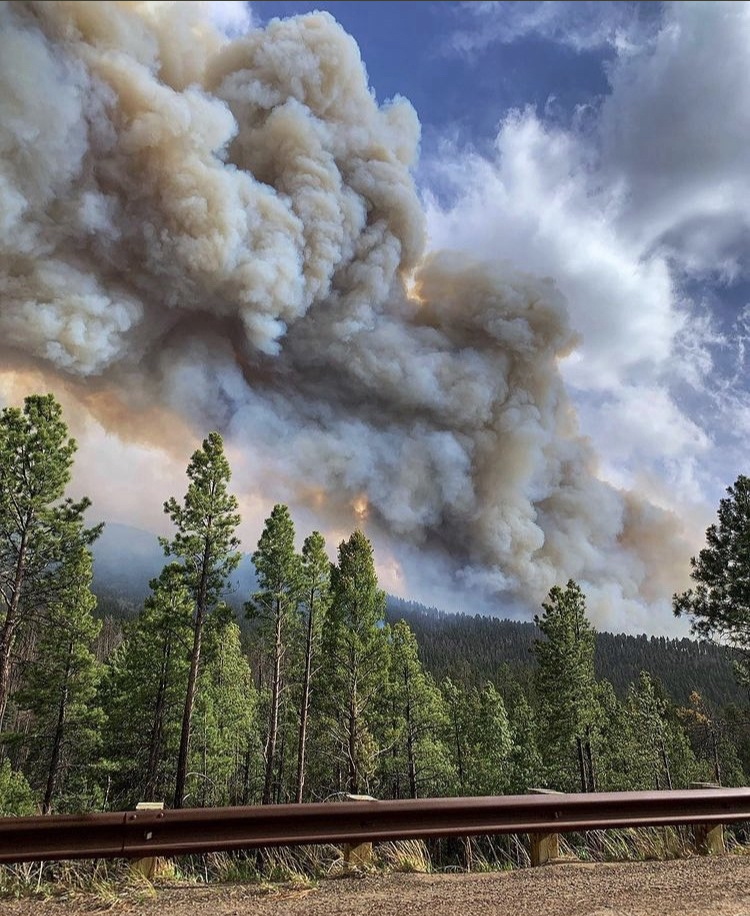
- Cerro Pelado Fire Raging seen from NM 4
- Date: April 22, 2022
- Location: New Mexico: Sandoval County
- Coordinates: 35.775°N 106.585°W

Statistics
- Burned area: 45,605 acres (18,456 ha)

Impacts
- Deaths: 0
- Injuries: 0
- Structures destroyed: 10

Ignition
- Cause: Under investigation

Map
- Location within New Mexico

The Cerro Pelado Fire was a wildfire that burned in the southern Jemez Mountains in Sandoval County, southwest of Los Alamos, in the state of New Mexico in the United States as part of the 2022 New Mexico wildfire season. The cause of the fire was determined to be an escaped prescribed burn started by the US Forest Service. The wildfire started on April 22, 2022, during extreme fire weather conditions. As of 15 June 2022, the Cerro Pelado Fire has burned 45,605 acres (18,456 ha) and is 100% contained.

== Events ==
On April 22, 2022, large portions of New Mexico experienced extreme fire conditions, including a red flag warning from the National Weather Service (NWS) office in Albuquerque. The fire was first reported that afternoon, it was officially named the Cerro Pelado Fire after the nearby Cerro Pelado mountain.

The Cerro Pelado Fire was partially burning within the burn scar of the 2011 Las Conchas Fire, and near those of the 2013 Thompson Ridge Fire and the 2017 Cajete Fire.

On June 15, 2022, it was announced that the Cerro Pelado Fire was fully contained. The New Mexico Type 3 Team will now hand charge to the Jemez Ranger District June 15, 2022.

== Cause ==
An investigation by the United States Forest Service concluded in 2023 determined that the probable cause was debris-burning activities. A prescribed burn by the USFS had taken place in the area and several debris piles left by logging activity had been ignited in January and February 2022. The piles were monitored occasionally following the initial prescribed burn and some of the piles in the ignition area retained heat as late as April 20, 2022. Fire crews would create berms around hot piles and spread the ashes to allow the heat to escape. The red flag event led to the spread of hot ash and embers from the burn piles, igniting the fire.

== Impacts ==
=== Closures ===
The fire prompted the closure of the nearby Bandelier National Monument and the Valles Caldera National Preserve, as well as New Mexico State Road 4 from mile marker 27 to mile marker 59.

=== Weather/Health ===
Smoke from the Cerro Pelado Fire, in addition to the Calf Canyon/Hermits Peak Fire and Cooks Peak Fire burning in northern New Mexico, contributed to poor air quality throughout the region.

=== Policy changes ===
Following the investigation into the fire, the U.S. Forest Service implemented additional measures for prescribed fire operations in the Southwestern Region, including monitoring pile burns with handheld thermal imaging devices and drones capable for detecting residual heat.

== Progression and containment status ==
Fire containment status Gray: contained; Red: active; %: percent contained;
| Date | Area burned acres (km^{2}) | Containment |
|---|---|---|
| April 22 | 50 (0) | |
| April 23 | 3,445 (14) | ¹ |
| April 24 | 3,445 (14) | |
| April 25 | 4,688 (19) | |
| April 26 | 4,903 (20) | |
| April 27 | 5,711 (23) | |
| April 28 | 6,119 (25) | |
| April 29 | 7,245 (29) | |
| April 30 | 15,650 (63) | |
| May 1 | 17,885 (72) | |
| May 2 | 22,314 (90) | |
| May 3 | 25,004 (101) | |
| May 4 | 26,927 (109) | |
| May 5 | 29,368 (119) | |
| May 6 | 32,121 (130) | |
| May 7 | 34,671 (140) | |
| May 8 | 37,425 (151) | |
| May 9 | 40,958 (166) | |
| May 10 | 42,491 (172) | |

¹April 23 true acreage is unknown due to inaccurate mapping.

== See also ==
- Calf Canyon/Hermits Peak Fire
- 2022 New Mexico Wildfire Season
