= Whitewater–Baldy complex Fire =

Wildfire in New Mexico, United States

Whitewater-Baldy Complex Fire
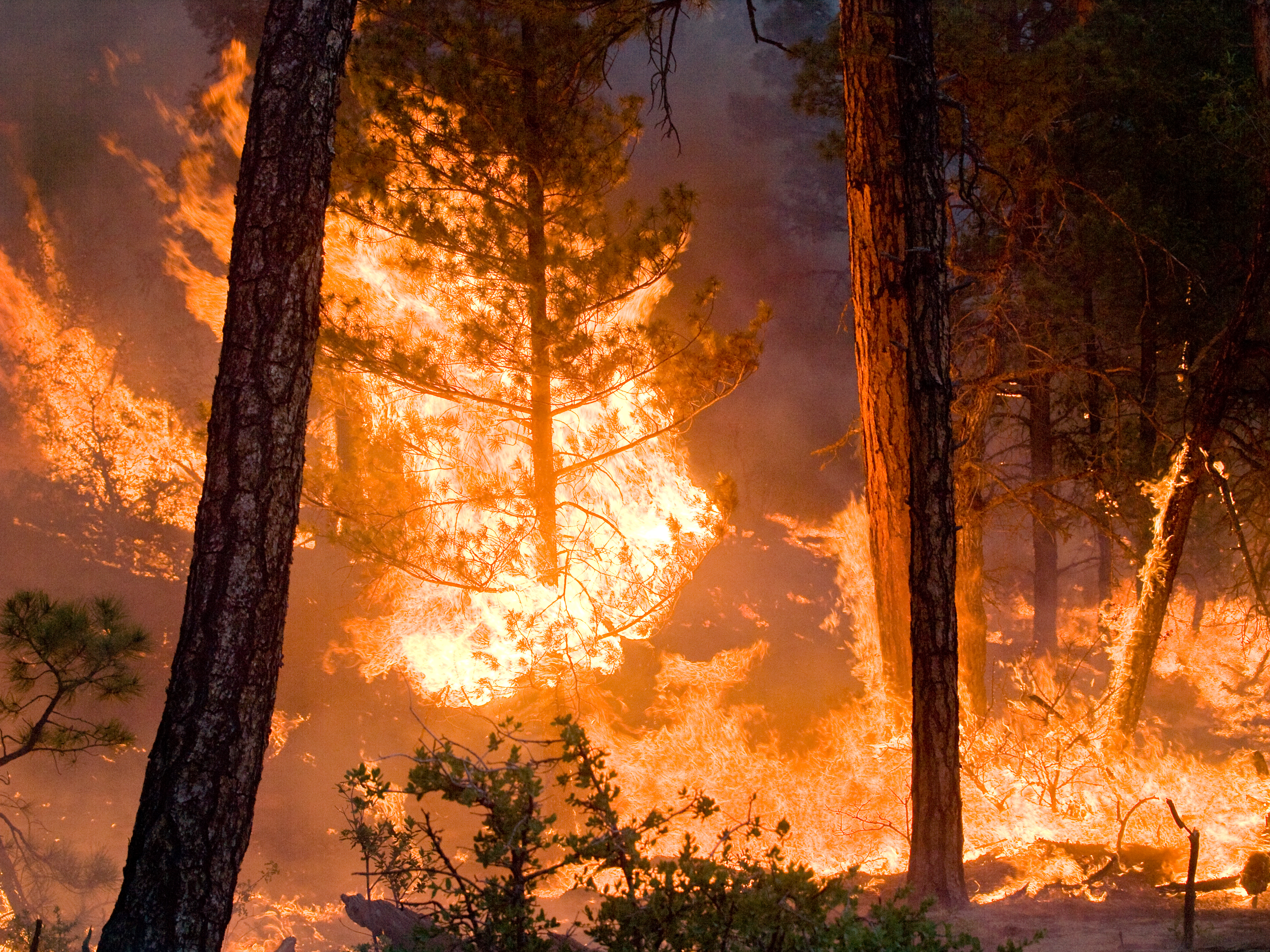
- Date: May 16, 2012 – July 31, 2012
- Location: Gila National Forest, New Mexico
- Coordinates: 33.345°N 108.71°W

Statistics
- Burned area: 297,845 acres (1,205 km^{2})

Ignition
- Cause: Lightning

Map
- Location within New Mexico Location within the United States

The Whitewater–Baldy complex Fire was a wildfire that started on May 9, 2012, in Catron County, New Mexico, USA. The fire burned more than 297,845 acres (465.383 sq mi; 120,534 ha) in Gila National Forest and was fully contained on July 31, 2012. The area of the fire well surpassed that of the Las Conchas Fire of 2011, making Whitewater–Baldy the largest wildfire in New Mexico state history until it was surpassed in May 2022 by the Calf Canyon/Hermits Peak Fire. The Whitewater-Baldy Fire Complex burned mostly within the Gila Wilderness, which includes the fire's namesake mountain, Whitewater Baldy.

== Summary ==
The fire started as two separate fires, the Whitewater fire which was detected on May 16 and the smaller Baldy fire that started earlier on May 9, both from lightning strikes. The fires merged on 24 May. The fire has burned more than a dozen residences, caused the evacuation of several small towns, and forced the closure of the Gila Cliff Dwellings National Monument and the Catwalk Recreation Area above Glenwood, New Mexico. The fire grew rapidly at a rate of 20,000 acres (8,100 ha) per day from May 28 to June 9, after which growth slowed. Rain showers in mid-July helped firefighters reach 95% containment by July 23 and 100% containment by July 31.

== Government response ==
On May 15, 2012, as a result of the Whitewater–Baldy complex fire, governor Susana Martinez declared the entire state of New Mexico to be in a drought. Martinez issued the formal drought declaration to help farmers, ranchers, and others secure federal drought funding. Martinez stated that in addition to "the work we're doing at the state level to assist communities facing serious drought conditions, I'm hopeful this declaration will assist them in securing any available federal funding as well." Martinez stated that "As a result of this fire, small businesses are unquestionably feeling the impact." As a result, she encouraged them to apply for SBA loans. On June 8, Martinez declared Catron County, New Mexico to be in a state of emergency. The declaration made funds available for both state and local response to the fire, and for community needs.

== See also ==
- Black Fire (2022), now the second largest fire in state history
