= Black Fire (2022) =

2022 wildfire in New Mexico

- Part of the 2022 New Mexico wildfires
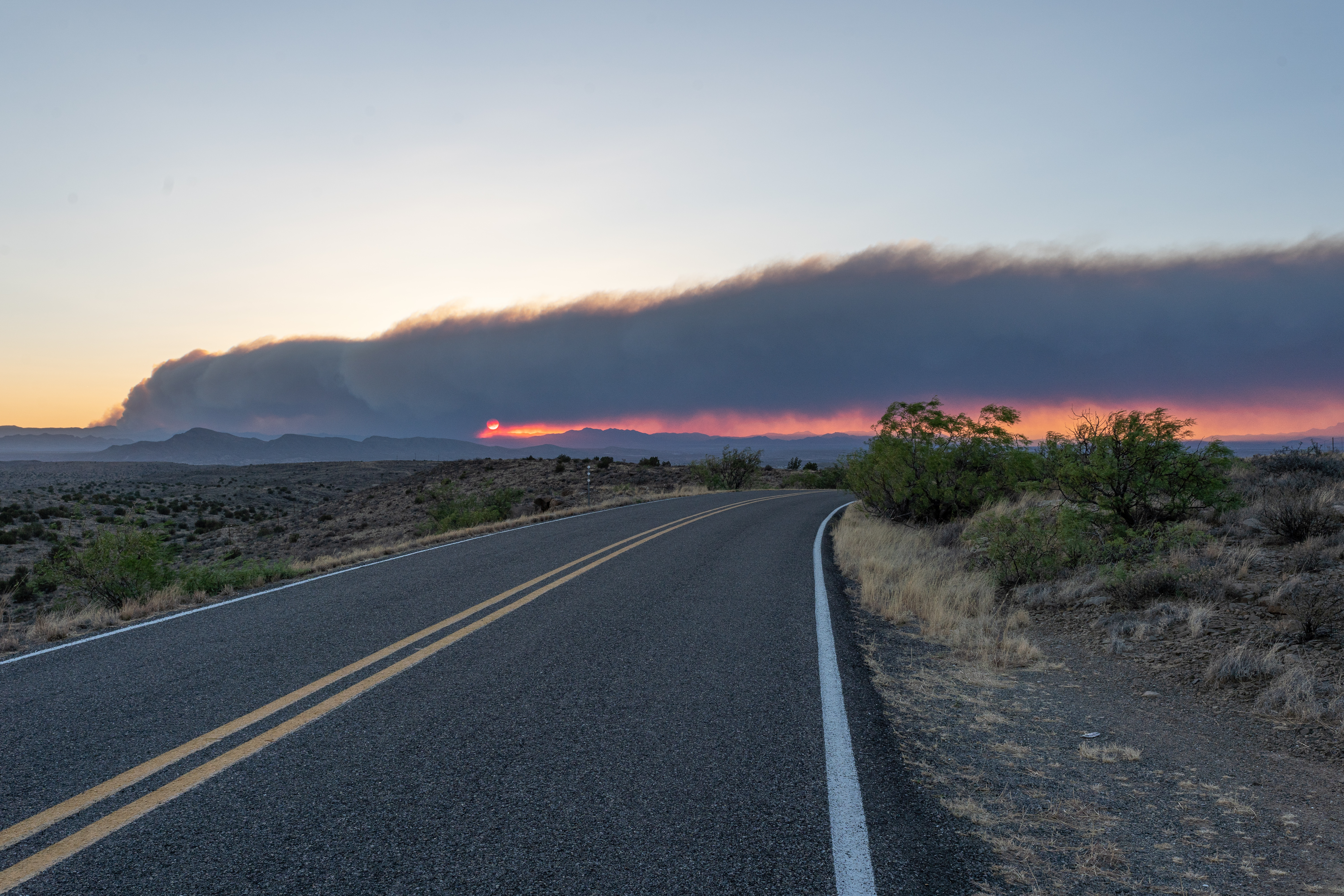
- The Black Fire viewed at sunset from NM 51W on 16 May 2022
- Date: May 13, 2022 – July 27, 2022
- Location: New Mexico: Sierra County; Catron County; Grant County
- Coordinates: 33.245°N 107.927°W

Statistics
- Burned area: 325,133 acres (131,577 ha)

Impacts
- Deaths: 0
- Injuries: Unknown
- Structures destroyed: 2 destroyed, 51 threatened

Ignition
- Cause: Human, under investigation

Map
- Perimeter of Black Fire
- Location in New Mexico Black Fire (2022) (the United States)

The Black Fire was a massive wildfire that burned in the northern Black Range in Sierra County, Catron County, and Grant County, Northeast of Silver City, in the state of New Mexico in the United States as part of the 2022 New Mexico wildfire season.

On June 9 the fire surpassed the Whitewater–Baldy complex Fire to become the second largest fire in modern New Mexico history, behind the Calf Canyon/Hermits Peak Fire. Previously, on May 27, it had become the third largest fire in state history.

As of 25 June 2022, the Black Fire has burned 325,133 acres (131,577 ha) and is 70% contained. The fire has destroyed 2 structures and threatens an additional 51 structures nearby. The footprint of the fire spans approximately 33 miles north to south, and 30 miles east to west.

== Events ==
The Black fire started on May 13, due to human cause.

The origin of the fire was centered on "Me-Own Air Strip" off of Forest Road 150 near Middle Mesa, in a rural area of Gila National Forest.

In the span of one week the fire grew to 100,000 acres. As of May 21 there are 615 personnel working on the fire. The fire is being managed by a type 2 team, the Southwest Area Incident Management Team 5, led by Mike Spilde.

The region has been experiencing sustained critical fire weather conditions, including red flag warnings, which are contributing to explosive fire growth.

Between May 15 and May 17, the fire grew over 27,000 acres per a day, fueled by red flag conditions. On May 18, the Black Fire became the fourth largest wildfire in recorded New Mexico state history.

As of 21 May 2022, the blaze is over 120,000 acres and 4% contained.

As of 31 May 2022, the blaze is over 246,648 acres and 28% contained.

As of 9 June 2022, the blaze is over 298,440 acres and 44% contained.

As of 25 June 2022, the blaze is over 325,133 acres and 70% contained.

== Impacts ==
Much of the burn area encompasses the Aldo Leopold Wilderness.

The fire has burned over 41 miles of the Continental Divide Trail, as well as 7.5 miles of the scenic spur trail to Reeds Peak. The CDT has been rerouted to avoid the fire. The CDT has also been rerouted in the past due to previous fires in the area.

=== Injuries, deaths, and destruction ===
No fatalities have been reported as a result of the Black Fire.

=== Closures and evacuations ===
Gila National Forest was under level 2 fire restrictions and New Mexico Highways 59 and 152 were closed.

=== Environmental ===
Smoke from the Black Fire, in addition to the Calf Canyon/Hermits Peak Fire burning in northern New Mexico, has contributed to poor air quality throughout the region.

=== Cultural ===
Gila Cliff Dwellings National Monument and the historic mining town of Winston, New Mexico, are in the vicinity of the fire. Protective measures have been deployed by the Forest Service in order to prevent damage to historical cabins.

== Progression and containment status ==
Acreage and containment figures for the Black Fire:

Fire containment status Gray: contained; Red: active; %: percent contained;
Date	Area burned acres (km^{2})	Containment
May 13	200 (1)	
May 14	500 (2)	
May 15	1,174 (5)	
May 16	18,762 (76)	
May 17	56,132 (227)	
May 18	77,529 (314)	
May 19	93,014 (376)	
May 20	104,969 (425)	
May 21	120,785 (489)	
May 22	130,224 (527)	
May 23	146,479 (593)	
May 24	154,911 (627)	
May 25	167,378 (677)	
May 26	179,539 (727)	
May 27	191,459 (775)	
May 28	212,118 (858)	
May 29	228,311 (924)	
May 30	241,403 (977)	
May 31	246,648 (998)	
June 1	254,840 (1,031)	
June 2	262,695 (1,063)	
June 3	264,657 (1,071)	
June 4	268,218 (1,085)	
June 5	278,188 (1,126)	
June 6	287,273 (1,163)	
June 7	292,770 (1,185)	
June 8	296,895 (1,201)	
June 9	298,440 (1,208)	
June 10	300,336 (1,215)	
June 11	304,550 (1,232)	
June 12	304,550 (1,232)	
June 13	311,692 (1,261)	
June 14	312,519 (1,265)	
June 15	317,676 (1,286)	
June 16	320,971 (1,299)	
June 17	324,132 (1,312)	
June 18	324,909 (1,315)	
June 19	325,042 (1,315)	
June 20	325,111 (1,316)	
June 21	325,115 (1,316)	
June 22	325,128 (1,316)	

== See also ==
- Calf Canyon/Hermits Peak Fire
- 2022 New Mexico wildfires
- Whitewater-Baldy complex Fire, surpassed as the second largest in state history
