= Susana Martinez =

American politician (born 1959)

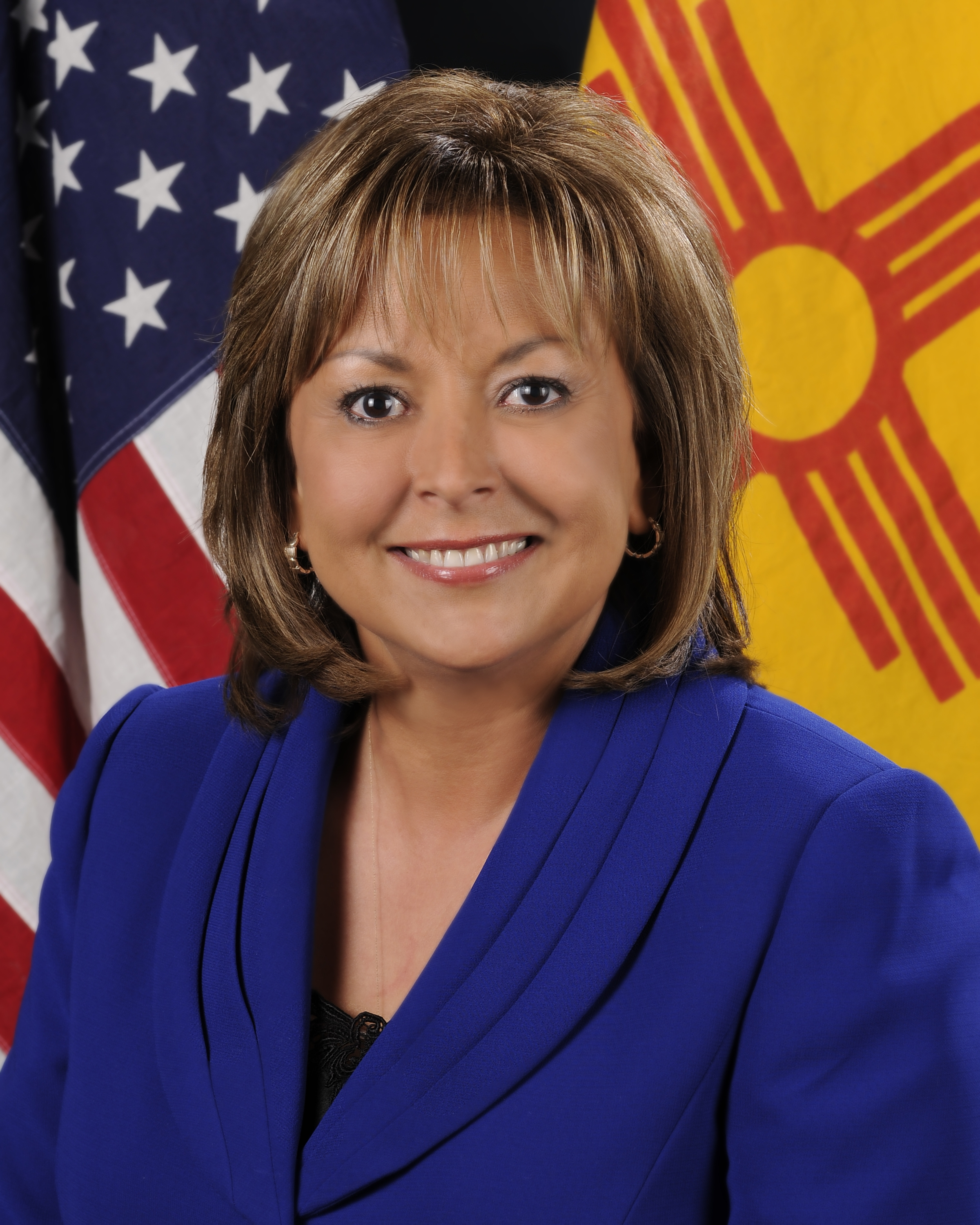
- Official portrait, 2010

31st Governor of New Mexico
- In office January 1, 2011 – January 1, 2019
- Lieutenant: John Sanchez
- Preceded by: Bill Richardson
- Succeeded by: Michelle Lujan Grisham

District Attorney for the 3rd Judicial District
- In office January 1, 1997 – January 1, 2011
- Preceded by: Greg Valdez
- Succeeded by: Amy Orlando

Personal details
- Born: July 14, 1959 (age 67) El Paso, Texas, U.S.
- Party: Republican (1995 or 1996-present)
- Other political affiliations: Democratic (before 1995 or 1996)
- Spouse: Chuck Franco (m. 1991; div. 2019)
- Children: 1 stepson
- Education: University of Texas, El Paso (BA); University of Oklahoma (JD)

Susana Martinez (born July 14, 1959) is an American politician and attorney who served as 31st governor of New Mexico from 2011 to 2019. A Republican, she served as chair of the Republican Governors Association (RGA) from 2015 to 2016. She was the first female Governor of New Mexico, and the first Hispanic female governor in the United States.

Born in El Paso, Texas, Martinez is a graduate of the University of Oklahoma College of Law. After being admitted to the State Bar of New Mexico, she began her prosecuting career in 1986 as an Assistant District Attorney for the 3rd Judicial District of New Mexico, based in Las Cruces. She was appointed Deputy District Attorney in 1992. She joined the Republican Party and ran for District Attorney in 1996, serving three terms, from 1997 to 2011.

After incumbent Governor Bill Richardson was term limited, Martinez declared her 2010 candidacy for the governorship. She won a five-candidate Republican primary and went on to defeat the then incumbent Lieutenant Governor of New Mexico Diane Denish with 53% of the vote in the general election. Four years later, she was reelected with 57% of the vote against New Mexico Attorney General Gary King. In 2013, Martinez was named one of Time magazine's 100 most influential people in the world.

== Early life, education, and early career ==
Susana Martinez was born on July 14, 1959, in El Paso, Texas. She was brought up in a middle-class family of Mexican descent. Her father, Jacobo "Jake" Martinez, was a boxer for the U.S. Marines during the Korean War, and won three straight Golden Gloves titles in the 1950s. He served as a deputy sheriff for El Paso County. Her mother, Paula Aguirre, worked in various offices. Susana Martinez has two siblings, a sister and a brother. Martinez was the legal guardian and caretaker of her older sister, Letitia "Lettie" Martinez, who had cerebral palsy and was developmentally disabled. Lettie died at age 64 on August 13, 2021. Martinez is a great-granddaughter of Mexican Revolutionary General Toribio Ortega.

Martinez attended Riverside High School in El Paso, Texas. As a student, she was actively involved in various clubs and councils. She ran for and won the position of student body president in her senior year. Being an honors student, she graduated as the valedictorian for the class of 1977. She earned her bachelor's degree in criminal justice from the University of Texas at El Paso in 1981. She moved to Oklahoma and pursued the J.D. degree from the University of Oklahoma College of Law. She graduated in 1986.

== District Attorney's office ==
=== Assistant and deputy ===
Martinez was Assistant District Attorney for the 3rd Judicial District, serving Doña Ana County, New Mexico, from 1986 to 1992. As Assistant District Attorney, she developed a specialty in the office of working with sexually abused children and developing a multidisciplinary team (that included help for victims). She participated in seminars related to domestic violence and sexual offenses, rapes and women and children. The district attorney for whom she worked, Doug Driggers, promoted her to Deputy District Attorney.

Martinez was dismissed, but later returned, and was again appointed as Deputy District Attorney. She helped campaign for Driggers as he was running for a third term as District Attorney. Driggers lost the Democratic primary election to Gregory Valdez, a defense attorney. Martinez was fired by Valdez shortly after his victory in the general election. Valdez claims that he fired Martinez because she had missed key timelines in a case. Martinez filed a wrongful termination lawsuit against Valdez and was awarded an out-of-court settlement of $100,000 to $120,000. She later twice defeated Valdez in the general election for District Attorney with approximate 18-point and 20-point wins, respectively.

Martinez was first elected district attorney in the 3rd Judicial District in 1996 with nearly 60% of the vote. She was re-elected three more times.

As a prosecutor, Martinez focused on cases involving public corruption and child abuse. She worked to pass legislation to expand Katie's Law to "require a DNA sample for all felony arrests". During her first term as governor, she signed the expansion bill into law in April 2011.

== Governor of New Mexico (2011–2019) ==
=== 2010 election ===
With 51% of the vote in a five-way contest, Martinez won the Republican nomination for governor of New Mexico in the primary election on June 1, 2010. Martinez defeated PR firm owner Doug Turner, State Representative Janice Arnold-Jones, Pete Domenici, Jr. (son of the former U.S. Senator Pete Domenici), and former Republican Party state chairman Allen Weh. During the primary campaign, Martinez was endorsed by former Alaska Governor Sarah Palin.

With 53% of the vote, Martinez defeated Diane Denish, then lieutenant governor of New Mexico in the general election on November 2, 2010. One element of her platform was to secure the Mexico–United States border from illegal immigrants. She defeated Denish by over 40,605 votes; she received 321,219 votes to Denish's 280,614 votes. The Martinez v. Denish race, and the simultaneous Mary Fallin v. Jari Askins race in Oklahoma, were the third and fourth cases of gubernatorial races in U.S. history in which two women were competitors (since the elections of Kay Orr in Nebraska in 1986 and Linda Lingle in Hawaii in 2002). Each of the victors was the Republican woman candidate.

=== 2014 election ===
On October 15, 2013, Martinez declared she would run for re-election. At the time of her announcement, she had already raised over $2.2 million in campaign contributions, nearly five times the amount of any of her challengers in the gubernatorial Democratic Primary. In the end she raised over $7 million in campaign money.

Martinez faced no Republican primary opposition. On November 4, 2013, State Attorney General Gary King was the nominee chosen by voters in the Democratic primary to challenge Martinez; he received 35% in a five-way race. From the moment King won the primary, Martinez spent the entire campaign on daily and hourly TV attack commercials against King, which continued up to the day of the general election. 2014 had the lowest voting turn-out rate that year. On November 4, 2014, Martinez defeated King winning re-election with 57% of the vote.

=== Tenure ===
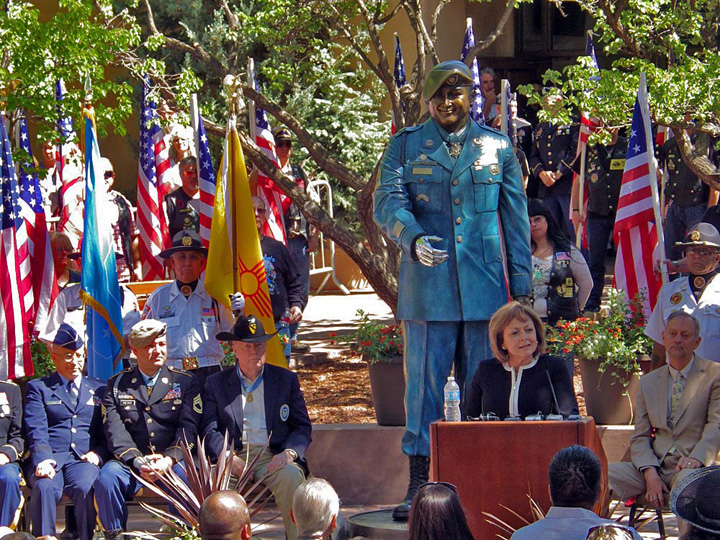
Martinez speaking at the unveiling of the statue of Leroy Petry, a Medal of Honor recipient, June 24, 2013

When Martinez took office, she set out a budget proposal for fiscal year 2012 and 2013, as well as establishing a moratorium on all state vehicle purchases until 2012. She barred all state agencies from hiring former lobbyists.

On January 31, 2011, Martinez signed an executive order rescinding sanctuary status for illegal immigrants who commit crimes in New Mexico.

Martinez counts among her legislative victories: "the cap on film [tax] credits; a bill that would exempt locomotive fuel from state gross-receipts tax; and an expansion of Katie's Law, which will require law-enforcement officials to obtain DNA samples from all suspects booked on felony charges". She supported and signed a bill that will "assign schools the grades of A to F based on student achievement and other factors, such as high-school graduation rates. Martinez described her push for education reforms as 'a hard-fought battle against those who continued to defend the status quo'". In April 2011, Martinez signed the expansion bill on Katie's Law. and a bill banning the use of corporal punishment in public schools, making New Mexico the 31st state (and currently most recent) to ban the practice in public schools.

In 2011, the Supreme Court of New Mexico ruled twice against actions by Martinez. "In January, the court unanimously decided that Martinez acted improperly when she requested the state's records administrator delay publishing greenhouse-gas emissions rules that the state Environmental Improvement Board approved shortly before she took office." In addition, a unanimous court ruled on April 13, 2011, that "Gov. Susana Martinez lacked authority to arbitrarily remove two members of the state Public Employee Labor Relations Board."

In 2011, Martinez attended her first "Tribal-State Summit," as required by New Mexico, in which the governor meets annually with the 22 recognized tribes. The topics of discussion for 2011 were tribal economic development and infrastructure; health care; natural resources, water, and education.

Martinez has pushed for an increase in private investment to complete the US$212 million state-funded Spaceport America project. In order to drive the new effort, Gov. Martinez appointed an entirely new board of directors to oversee the Spaceport Authority. In 2012, Martinez sold the state's luxury jet, which she called "the ultimate symbol of waste and excess"; it sold for $2.51 million.

The 2012 Las Conchas Fire, the third largest wildfire in state history, required emergency actions. Martinez issued a state of emergency to control the use of fireworks. After the Las Conchas Fire burned to within miles of Los Alamos National Laboratory, Martinez made the removal of radioactive waste a top priority. The fire destroyed trees and vegetation that normally absorb waters; in their absence, the state was subject to flooding, and Martinez asked the Obama administration for federal relief funding.

In 2012, the chief medical officer for the New Mexico Department of Health and the deputy secretary both resigned. The individuals allege that Martinez ordered their termination for promoting birth control to the public. Martinez and the New Mexico Department of Health denied any connection between the resignations and an interview concerning condom use.

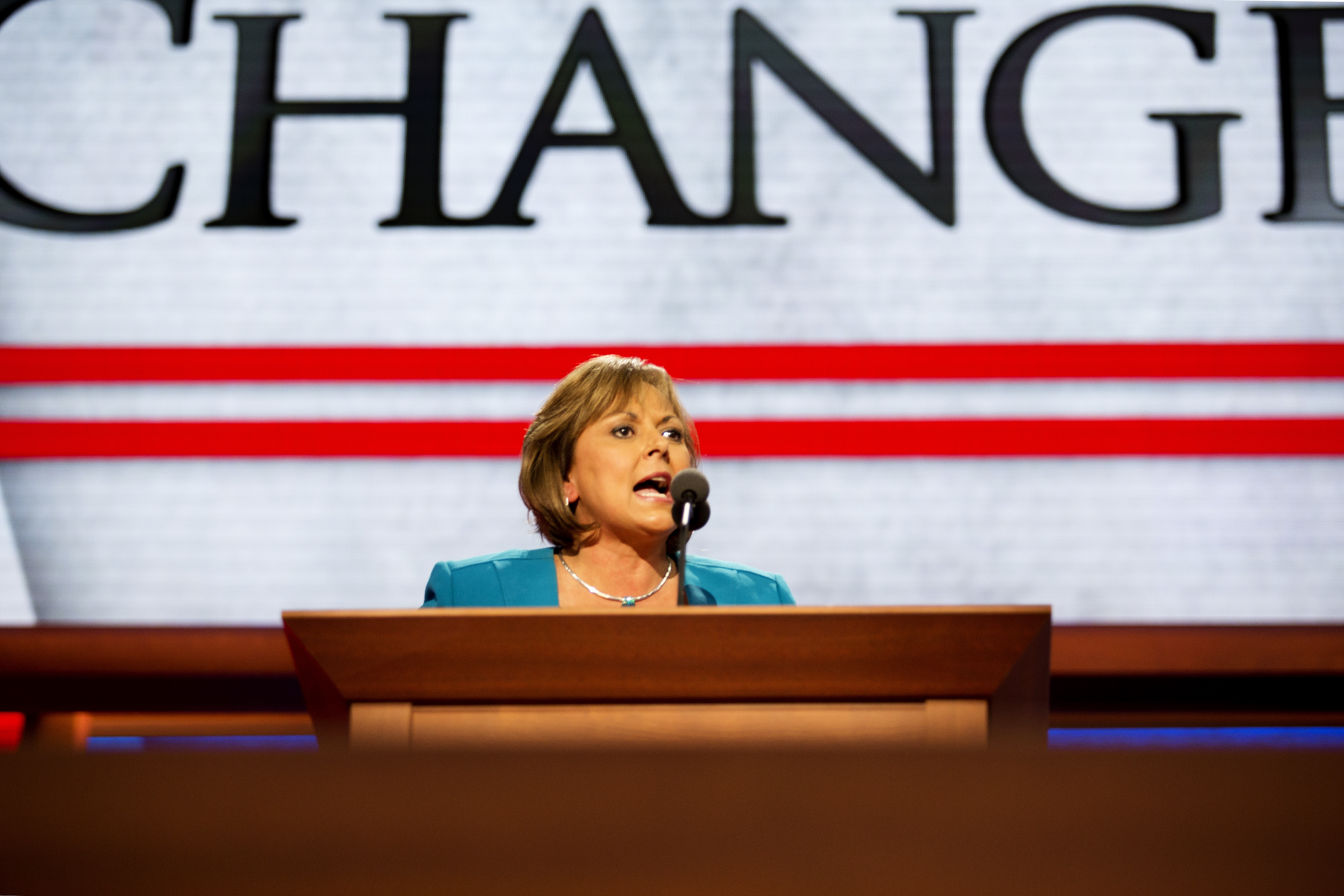
Martinez speaking at the 2012 Republican National Convention

Many Republicans speculated as to whether Martinez would be the vice presidential nominee on the Republican ticket in 2012 and 2016, but she said numerous times that she would not run.

On May 15, 2012, as a result of the Whitewater-Baldy Complex Fire, Martinez declared the entire state of New Mexico to be in a drought. Martinez issued the formal drought declaration to enable farmers, ranchers, and others secure federal drought funding. Martinez stated that "As a result of this fire, small businesses are unquestionably feeling the impact." She encouraged them to apply for SBA loans. On June 8, Martinez declared Catron County, New Mexico, to be in a state of emergency. The declaration made funds available for both state and local response to the fire, and for community needs.

At the 2012 Tribal-State Summit, Martinez discussed water rights, natural resources, education, and tribal economic development and infrastructure. In the presence of Navajo President Ben Shelly, as well as several members of the Navajo Nation Council, Martinez announced that Central Consolidated School District will remain intact.

In January 2013, Martinez announced that the Obamacare Medicaid expansion would go into effect in New Mexico.

On March 29, 2013, Martinez vetoed a raise in the state minimum wage, citing that the raise was higher than neighboring states.

As of May 2014, job losses in New Mexico had accelerated during the previous 12 months, making it one of two states in the nation to lose jobs. For the 12 months ending in April 2014, the state reported a net loss of 4,400 jobs, according to the state's Department of Workforce Solutions. The state has been affected by the reduction in spending and employment by the federal government. The sector lost 1,100 jobs during the period. New Mexico has been 50th in job growth since Martinez took office. Martinez has said that tax cuts enacted during her tenure make the state more competitive in attracting manufacturing jobs. The state was among the finalists for a new Tesla battery plant. She also says that infrastructure investments at the entry port of Santa Teresa will generate transportation and manufacturing jobs.

Martinez's term expired on January 1, 2019. She was succeeded by Democrat Michelle Lujan Grisham.

=== Controversies ===
==== FBI investigation into fundraising ====
On November 7, 2015, The Santa Fe New Mexican revealed that the FBI was conducting an investigation into Martinez's fundraising activities, going back to her first run for governor. The investigation was focused on activities of Martinez's chief political consultant Jay McCleskey. Four months later, in March 2016, the investigation was terminated and no charges were filed.

==== 2015 staff Christmas party ====
On December 13, 2015, staff at the El Dorado Hotel in Santa Fe, New Mexico, called police concerning a noisy party on the 4th floor of the hotel, where guests were throwing bottles off the balcony. They said they already had warned the guests after complaints from other hotel guests about the noise. Martinez, members of her family, and some of her staff were attending the party. The Santa Fe police released a 911 tape, on which Martinez is heard repeatedly asking who made the complaint, and telling the police dispatcher that the investigation of the noise complaint should be "called off," saying that officers were not needed. News outlets, politicians, hotel security, and police raised questions about the governor's sobriety during the incident. A responding Santa Fe Police officer had a belt recording that captured both police and hotel security referring to the governor as "inebriated".

==== Unfounded allegations against behavioral health providers ====
Using a provision of Obamacare requiring the freeze of Medicaid payments to healthcare providers when a credible allegation of fraud exists, the New Mexico Human Services Department suspended payments to 15 behavioral health organizations in 2013. The subsequent investigations, completed years later by Attorney General Hector Balderas, uncovered record keeping discrepancies at each organization, but did not find "an intentional pattern of fraud". Some of the organizations shut down because they were not able to sustain operations without Medicaid funds and were replaced by La Frontera, an Arizona-based company.

==== Settlement with state police officer ====
When Martinez took office as governor, she appointed state police officer Ruben Maynes to her personal protection detail. In 2014, Maynes left Martinez’s detail and in 2015 resigned from the state police department.

In July 2018, details of a 2015 financial settlement with Maynes came to light. Just two months after Maynes’ attorney informed Gov. Martinez that he was investigating claims against her and the state police chief, Pete Kassetas, for harassment and retaliation, the state quickly paid Maynes $200,000.

Two weeks after Martinez left office at the end of 2018, Tony Fetty, another member of Martinez’s security detail, filed a lawsuit against the state claiming that the state police department retaliated against him for raising concerns about Maynes’ conduct, including that he racked up gambling debts and that state government resources were being spent on personal activities. Fetty claims that “because of the overlapping of Agent Maynes’ personal life and frequency of non-professional concerns expressed by Gov. Martinez about Maynes, it became clear ... that there was a personal relationship between Gov. Martinez and Agent Maynes.” Fetty also says the governor’s husband, Chuck Franco, once told state police agents that he suspected his wife was having a relationship with Maynes. Maynes has denied that he had an affair with Martinez.

==== Secret lawsuit settlements ====
After Martinez left office, Pete Kassetas, the former chief of the New Mexico State Police went public with information about lawsuits filed by other former state employees – including more members of Martinez's security detail and her former longtime ally, Amy Orlando – that were secretly settled for $1.7 million in the final days of the Martinez administration without proper investigation. The settlements included confidentiality agreements extending to June 2023, a clear violation of New Mexico law which mandates public disclosure after 180 days. In May 2019, Gov. Michelle Lujan Grisham invalidated the confidentiality agreements and State Auditor Brian Colón launched an investigation.

In the demand for settlement with the state, one of the attorneys for the plaintiffs wrote that “...we have compelling and irrefutable evidence, obtained legally, by (former head of security detail) Sergeant Julia Armendariz, at the Governor’s insistence, from Governor Martinez’s husband, Mr. Franco, of the Governor’s significant personal issues and instances of inappropriate behavior ...”. Another lawyer asked the state for all “embarrassing or compromising” … information “…regarding the personal life, alcohol or drug abuse or addiction, personal or intimate relationships or marital conflicts of the Governor.”

Kassetas believed that the plaintiffs were “...attempting to extort the state based on potential personal embarrassing events surrounding the Governor and (first gentleman) Mr. Franco.”

In November 2019, State Auditor Brian Colón released the results of his department’s audit, performed by outside investigators, into the secret settlements and concluded that they were improperly awarded and were “an abuse of power” by the Martinez administration, adding, “you don’t have to be a rocket scientist to figure out that these were expedited settlements in the best interest of the administration’s reputation.” The amount of the suspicious settlements over Martinez's tenure as governor increased to nearly $3 million. Colón confirmed that he sent findings to Attorney General Hector Balderas and First Judicial District Attorney Marco Serna based in Santa Fe for possible violations of state law. In response to the audit findings, the Republican Party of New Mexico said “The Party believes all public officials should be held accountable for their actions, held to the highest standard and that all governmental activity should be honest and transparent. No one is above the law. In addition, it is imperative that any such settlements never be a burden on New Mexico taxpayers.”

=== Polling and opinion ===
In an April 2012 edition of The Washington Post, Martinez was named the 8th most-popular governor in the United States. According to a Public Opinion Strategies survey conducted in 2013 for Martinez's campaign, Martinez had one of the highest approval ratings among US governors.

In May 2013, Martinez had an approval rating of 66%. More than 44% of New Mexico's Democrats said they approved of her.

A January 2014 poll conducted by Research and Polling Inc., an Albuquerque-based pollster, on behalf of Common Cause New Mexico, ranked Martinez's approval rating at 55 percent.

An October 2016 poll showed a strong drop in approval ratings to 39%, with a disapproval rating of 49%.

In April 2017 market research firm Morning Consult published a poll of approval ratings for governors nationwide, which showed Martinez with an approval rating of 43%, and a disapproval rating of 48%, the 10th highest disapproval rating out of 49 governors.

A January 2018 poll conducted by Morning Consult showed a steep drop in the approval rating of outgoing (term-limited) governor Martinez, with a 37% approval and a 57% disapproval rating. This placed her as the third least popular sitting governor in the country.

== Political positions ==
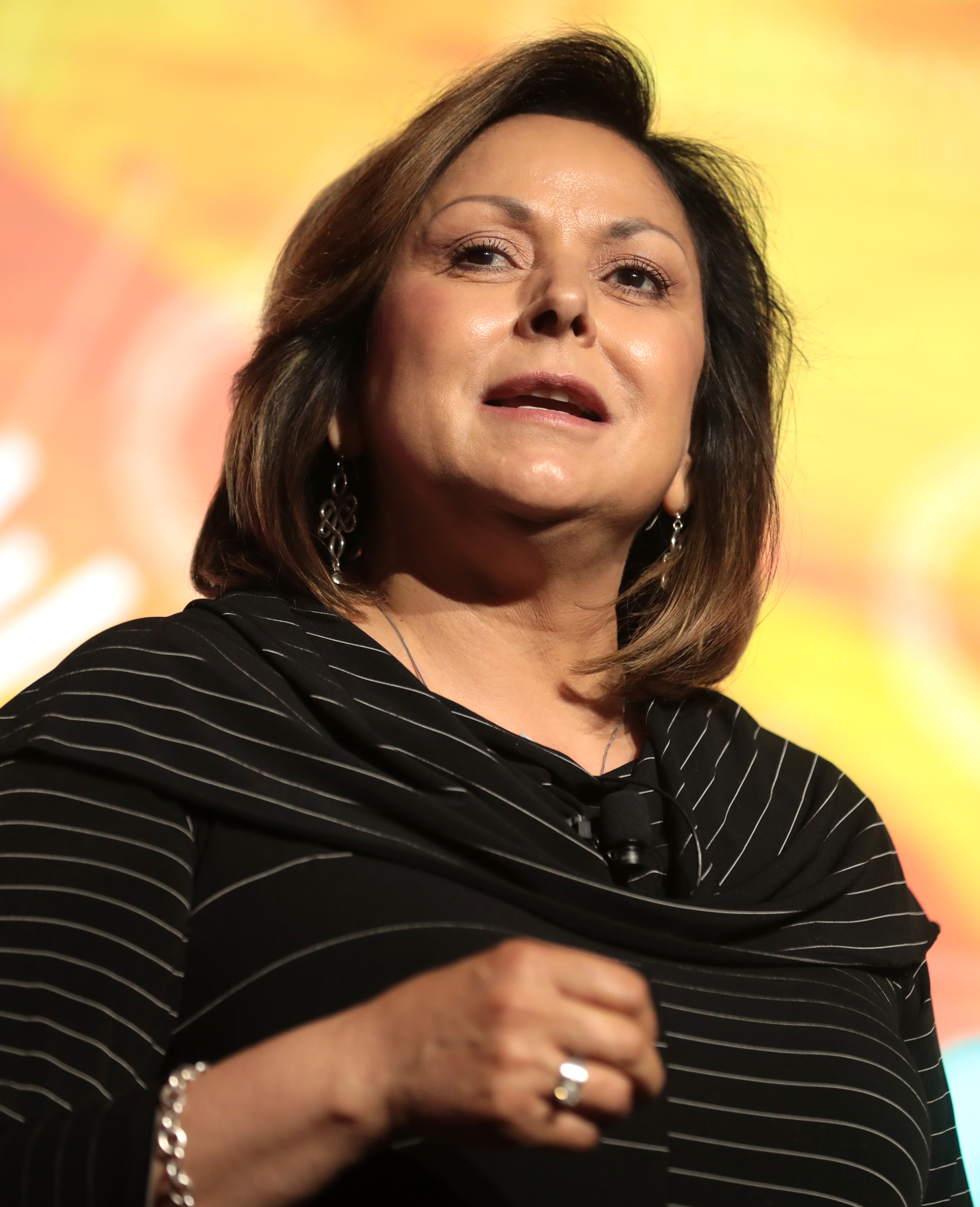
Martinez speaking at the 2021 Young Latino Leadership Summit

Martinez had grown up as a Democrat, but switched to the Republican Party in 1995. Describing her decision to switch parties, Martinez told the audience at the 2012 Republican National Convention that Republican friends had taken her to lunch to try to persuade her to join their ranks. She had attended the lunch simply to be polite, but stated that "When we left that lunch, we got in the car, and I looked over at [husband] Chuck and said, 'I'll be damned – we're Republicans.'"

Martinez supports a balanced budget and lower government spending. She favors putting taxpayer money into a rainy day fund, and refunding taxpayers to attempt to stimulate growth. Martinez is opposed to elective abortion. Martinez is personally opposed to same-sex marriage, but she accepted the New Mexico Supreme Court's opinion in Griego v. Oliver, which legalized same-sex marriage in New Mexico. She has no record on civil unions.

Although Martinez opposed New Mexico's medical marijuana program, she indicated that repealing the existing law was not a priority. Martinez opposes portions of the Affordable Care Act, such as the individual mandate, but does not support repeal of the law in its entirety. She supported expansion of Medicaid in her state as part of health care reform. She also supports Common Core education standards.

In November 2015, Martinez said she opposed the Obama administration's plans to admit 10,000 Syrian refugees to the U.S. until development of procedures for background-checking and resettlement of the refugees.

Martinez announced on August 17, 2016 that she would introduce legislation to reinstate the death penalty in 2017. On October 14, 2016, the New Mexico House of Representatives approved the bill on a 36–30 vote. The bill would have allowed for the death penalty for only three kinds of murder: child murder, murder of an on-duty police officer, and murder of a prison employee by an inmate.

In 2018, Martinez announced her support for the controversial immigration policy of President Donald Trump. In an interview with the Albuquerque Journal, Martinez told the paper “We don't let people who break the law continue to be out breaking the law simply because they have children."

== Personal life ==
Martinez met her first husband in Norman, Oklahoma, where they were both attending law school. The couple moved to Las Cruces, New Mexico, in the mid-1980s, but divorced three years later. She met her second husband, Chuck Franco, in Las Cruces, where they both worked in law enforcement. Martinez and Franco divorced in 2019.

On September 9, 2011, Martinez said she knew her paternal grandparents, Adolfo Martinez and Francisca Ortega, had immigrated to the United States from Mexico "without documents". They appeared to have followed the rules at the time.

=== Board positions ===
Martinez is a board member for American Edge, a lobbying group for the technology industry.

She also serves as vice chair of the board of directors at The Hunt Institute, an education policy nonprofit that supports states across the country understand policy issues that impact their state.

=== Awards and honors ===
- 2010 – State Bar of New Mexico named Martinez "Prosecutor of the Year"
- 2013 – Time magazine named Martinez to their 100 most influential people in the world list

== Election history ==
Election	Political result	Candidate	Party	Votes	%
New Mexico gubernatorial election, 2014; Turnout: 503,185	Republican hold Majority: 73,913 (14.68%)	Susana Martinez	Republican	288,549	57%
New Mexico gubernatorial election, 2014; Turnout: 503,185	Republican hold Majority: 73,913 (14.68%)	Gary King	Democratic	214,636	43%
New Mexico gubernatorial primary election, 2014	Republican; Majority: 67,127 (100%)	Susana Martinez	Republican	unopposed	
New Mexico gubernatorial election, 2010; Turnout: 602,827	Republican win (gain); Majority: 40,605 (6%)	Susana Martinez	Republican	321,219	53%
New Mexico gubernatorial election, 2010; Turnout: 602,827	Republican win (gain); Majority: 40,605 (6%)	Diane Denish	Democratic	280,614	46%
New Mexico gubernatorial primary election, 2010; Turnout: 122,269	Republican; Majority: 28,279 (23%)	Susana Martinez	Republican	62,006	51%
New Mexico gubernatorial primary election, 2010; Turnout: 122,269	Republican; Majority: 28,279 (23%)	Allen Weh	Republican	33,727	28%
New Mexico gubernatorial primary election, 2010; Turnout: 122,269	Republican; Majority: 28,279 (23%)	Doug Turner	Republican	14,166	11%
New Mexico gubernatorial primary election, 2010; Turnout: 122,269	Republican; Majority: 28,279 (23%)	Pete Domenici, Jr.	Republican	8,630	7%
New Mexico gubernatorial primary election, 2010; Turnout: 122,269	Republican; Majority: 28,279 (23%)	Janice Arnold–Jones	Republican	3,740	3%
3rd Judicial District General Election, 2008	Republican hold Majority: 45,098 (100%)	Susana Martinez	Republican	unopposed	
3rd Judicial District General Election, 2004; Turnout: 60,451	Republican hold Majority: 9,225 (20%)	Susana Martinez	Republican	34,838	60%
3rd Judicial District General Election, 2004; Turnout: 60,451	Republican hold Majority: 9,225 (20%)	Gregory Valdez	Democratic	25,613	40%
3rd Judicial District General Election, 2000; Turnout: 29,714	Republican hold Majority: 1,972 (4%)	Susana Martinez	Republican	15,843	52%
3rd Judicial District General Election, 2000; Turnout: 29,714	Republican hold Majority: 1,972 (4%)	Kent E. Yalkut	Democratic	13,871	48%
3rd Judicial District General Election, 1996; Turnout: 41,839	Republican win (gain); Majority: 7,505 (18%)	Susana Martinez	Republican	24,672	59%
3rd Judicial District General Election, 1996; Turnout: 41,839	Republican win (gain); Majority: 7,505 (18%)	Gregory Valdez	Democratic	17,167	41%

== See also ==
- List of female governors in the United States
- List of minority governors and lieutenant governors in the United States

Party political offices
Preceded by John Dendahl	Republican nominee for Governor of New Mexico; 2010, 2014	Succeeded by Steve Pearce
Preceded by Bill Haslam	Chair of the Republican Governors Association; 2015–2016	Succeeded by Scott Walker
Political offices
Preceded by Bill Richardson	Governor of New Mexico; 2011–2019	Succeeded by Michelle Lujan Grisham
U.S. order of precedence (ceremonial)
Preceded by Gary Johnson as Former Governor	Order of precedence of the United States; Within New Mexico	Succeeded by Jack Markell as Former Governor
Preceded by Gary Johnson as Former Governor	Order of precedence of the United States; Outside New Mexico	Succeeded by Fife Symington as Former Governor
