= Calf Canyon/Hermits Peak Fire =

2022 wildfire in New Mexico

- Part of the 2022 New Mexico wildfires
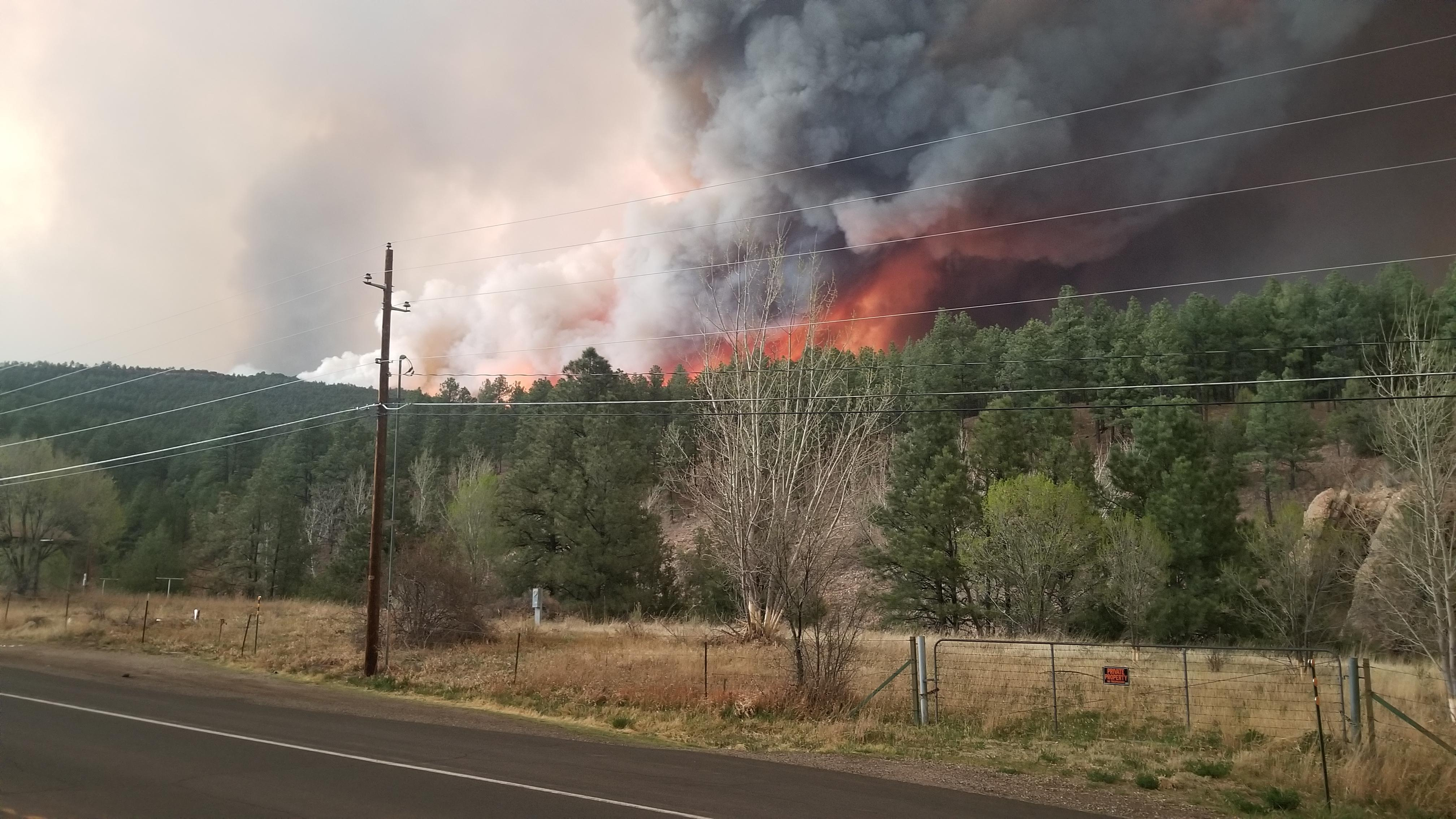
- The fire burns near Highway 518 in New Mexico on April 29, 2022.
- Date: April 6, 2022 - August 21, 2022
- Location: New Mexico: San Miguel County; Mora County; Taos County
- Coordinates: 35.759°N 105.503°W

Statistics
- Burned area: 341,471 acres (138,188 ha; 534 sq mi)

Impacts
- Deaths: 4
- Injuries: 3
- Structures lost: 903, 85 damaged

Ignition
- Cause: Escaped prescribed burn (Hermits Peak Fire) & leftover burn piles (Calf Canyon Fire)

Map
- The combined fires' perimeter on April 23 is outlined in yellow, the final fire perimeter is shown in red
- Location in New Mexico

The 2022 Calf Canyon/Hermits Peak Fire was the largest and most destructive wildfire in the history of New Mexico. The fire burned 341,471 acres (138,188 hectares) between early April and late June in the southern Sangre de Cristo Mountains, in San Miguel, Mora, and Taos counties. It was the most significant fire of the record-breaking 2022 New Mexico wildfire season, as well as the largest wildfire of the year in the contiguous United States. The fire destroyed at least 903 structures, including several hundred homes, and damaged 85 more.

The Calf Canyon/Hermits Peak Fire formed from the merger of two separate wildfires: the Hermits Peak Fire began on April 6 when the U.S. Forest Service lost control of a prescribed burn, and the Calf Canyon Fire began on April 9 when an improperly extinguished Forest Service pile burn from January rekindled. The two fires burned into each other during a major wind event on April 22, 2022. Afterwards, the combined blaze was managed as a single incident, growing to surpass the 2012 Whitewater-Baldy Complex fire to become New Mexico's largest ever before it was fully contained on August 21.

== Background ==
The spring of 2022 was one of New Mexico's top ten warmest ever, and its sixth-driest. It marked the persistence and intensification of a historically severe 'megadrought' in the American Southwest, a dry spell which began in roughly 2000.

== Progression ==
=== Ignitions ===
On April 6, 2022, personnel with the Santa Fe National Forest conducted a controlled burn project, called the Las Dispensas prescribed burn, in the Pecos/Las Vegas Ranger District of the Forest. Controlled or prescribed burns date back to indigenous land practices in the United States and are commonly conducted; they play a beneficial role in helping thin out fuels to prevent more severe wildfires, as well as in balancing ecosystems that depend on the introduction of fire.

However, seasonal winds in the afternoon of April 6 caused spot fires to ignite outside the project boundary, and the prescribed burn was declared a wildfire. It was officially named the Hermits Peak Fire, after a nearby mountain of the Sangre de Cristo range called Hermit Peak. Crews worked to contain the incident, and by April 19, the Hermits Peak Fire had burned 7,573 acres and was 91% contained.

On April 9, a new fire ignited several miles to the west of the Hermits Peak Fire, also within the Santa Fe National Forest. It was officially named the Calf Canyon Fire, after the nearby Calf Canyon Road. This fire was caused by leftover burn piles from a prescribed fire from January 2022. The fire grew to 123 acres by April 21, and that evening made a run to the north, growing significantly.

=== Merger ===
On the morning of Friday, April 22, the Hermits Peak Fire was 7,573 acres and 91% contained. The Calf Canyon Fire was approximately 3,000 acres and 0% contained. That same day, the region entered sustained critical fire weather conditions. A red flag warning was issued by the National Weather Service (NWS) extending from 9:00 AM to midnight local time, including winds from 60 to 74 miles per hour and temperatures in the upper 70s. The two fires grew rapidly to the northeast, exhibiting extreme fire behavior such as crowning and long-range spotting, and many structures were lost. The two fires merged as the winds fanned them, combining into a single fire footprint of approximately 42,341 acres by April 23.

Satellite imagery from GOES-16 shows the smoke plumes from the Calf Canyon/Hermits Peak Fire (right) and the Cerro Pelado Fire moving east during a wind event on April 29, 2022.

=== Growth ===
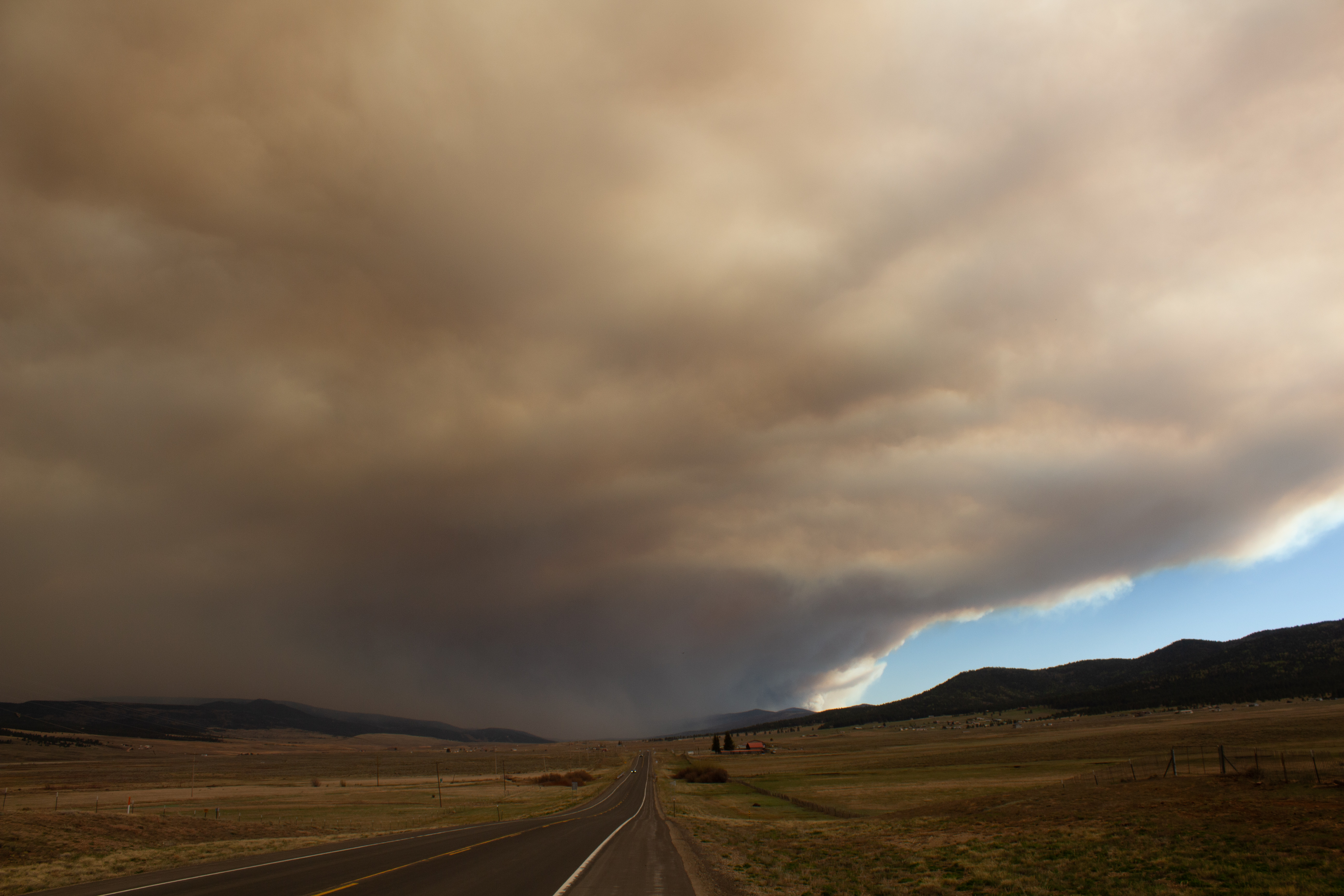
The Hermit’s Peak/Calf Canyon Fire, as pictured from Angel Fire, NM on May 10, 2022.

Severe fire weather conditions continued over the following weeks. Between April 29 and May 4, the fire grew over 10,000 acres a day, fueled by more red flag warning conditions. On May 3, the now-combined Calf Canyon/Hermits Peak Fire became the second largest wildfire in recorded New Mexico state history. Several days later, an 'unprecedented' period of severe fire weather began on May 7 and continued for nearly a week, fueling rapid growth of the fire, particularly on the northern flank. The fire often produced pyrocumulus and occasionally pyrocumulonimbus clouds, reaching tens of thousands of feet into the air. The smoke columns were highly visible for long distances, including in Santa Fe, Taos, Moriarty, and Albuquerque, New Mexico.

On May 16, due to the size and complexity of the incident, management of the suppression effort was reorganized. The fire was split into a north zone and a south zone: a Type 1 incident management team (IMT) managed the north zone, and a Type 3 IMT managed the south zone.

Personnel from across the U.S. contributed to the suppression effort. At one point, on May 27, there were over 3,000 personnel on the Calf Canyon/Hermits Peak Fire.

On August 21, it was declared the Calf Canyon/Hermits Peak Fire was 100% contained. The final footprint of the wildfire spanned approximately 45 miles north to south, and around 20 miles from west to east.

== Effects ==
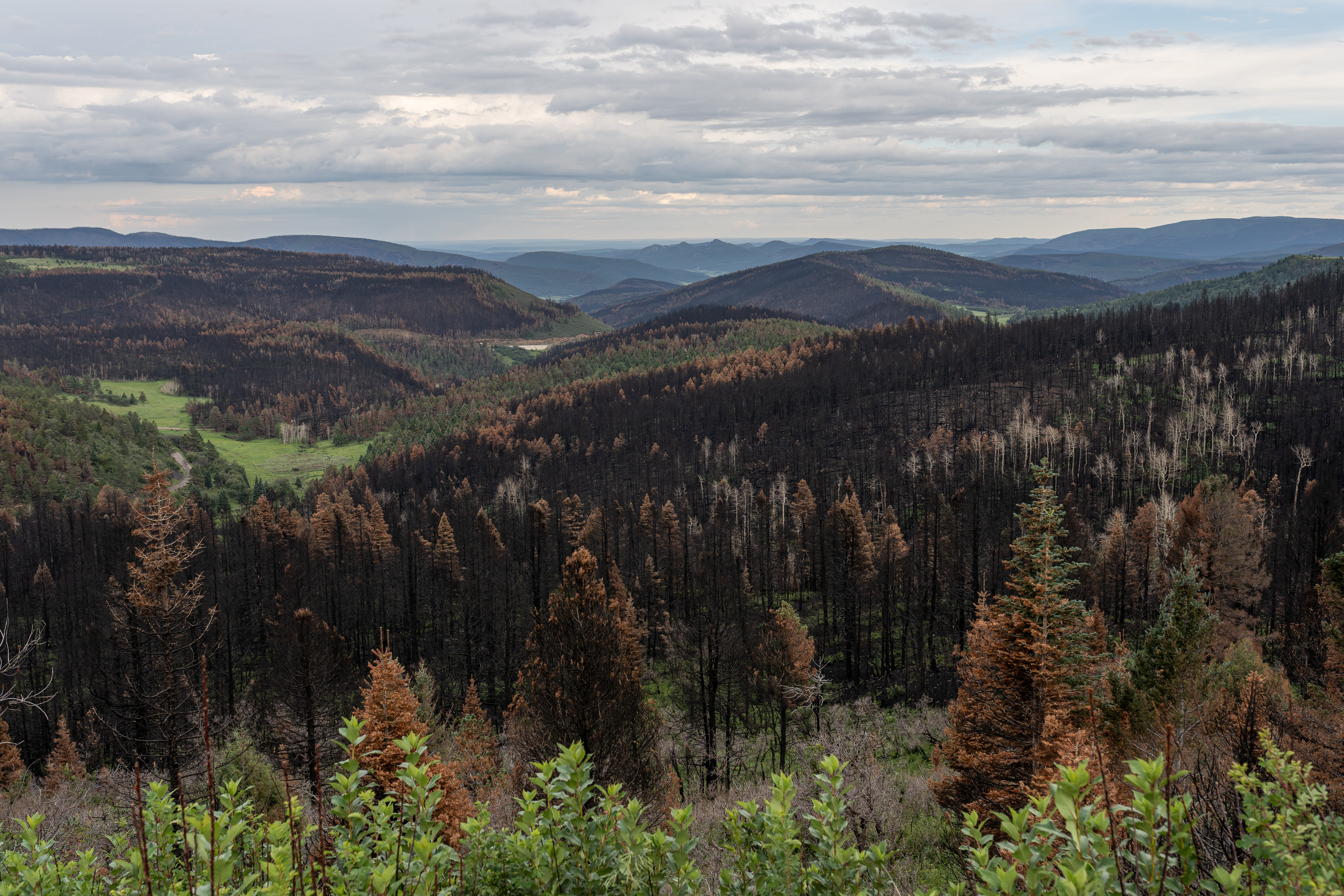
The view looking south from NM518 towards the burn scar from the Calf Canyon/Hermits Peak Fire

The Calf Canyon/Hermits Peak Fire drew attention and news coverage nationally, including multiple articles in The New York Times, The Washington Post, the Los Angeles Times, and other newspapers of record. On May 4, President Joe Biden approved a major disaster declaration for the state of New Mexico, allowing for federal aid to distributed to state and local authorities, as well as individuals in affected counties during the recovery process.

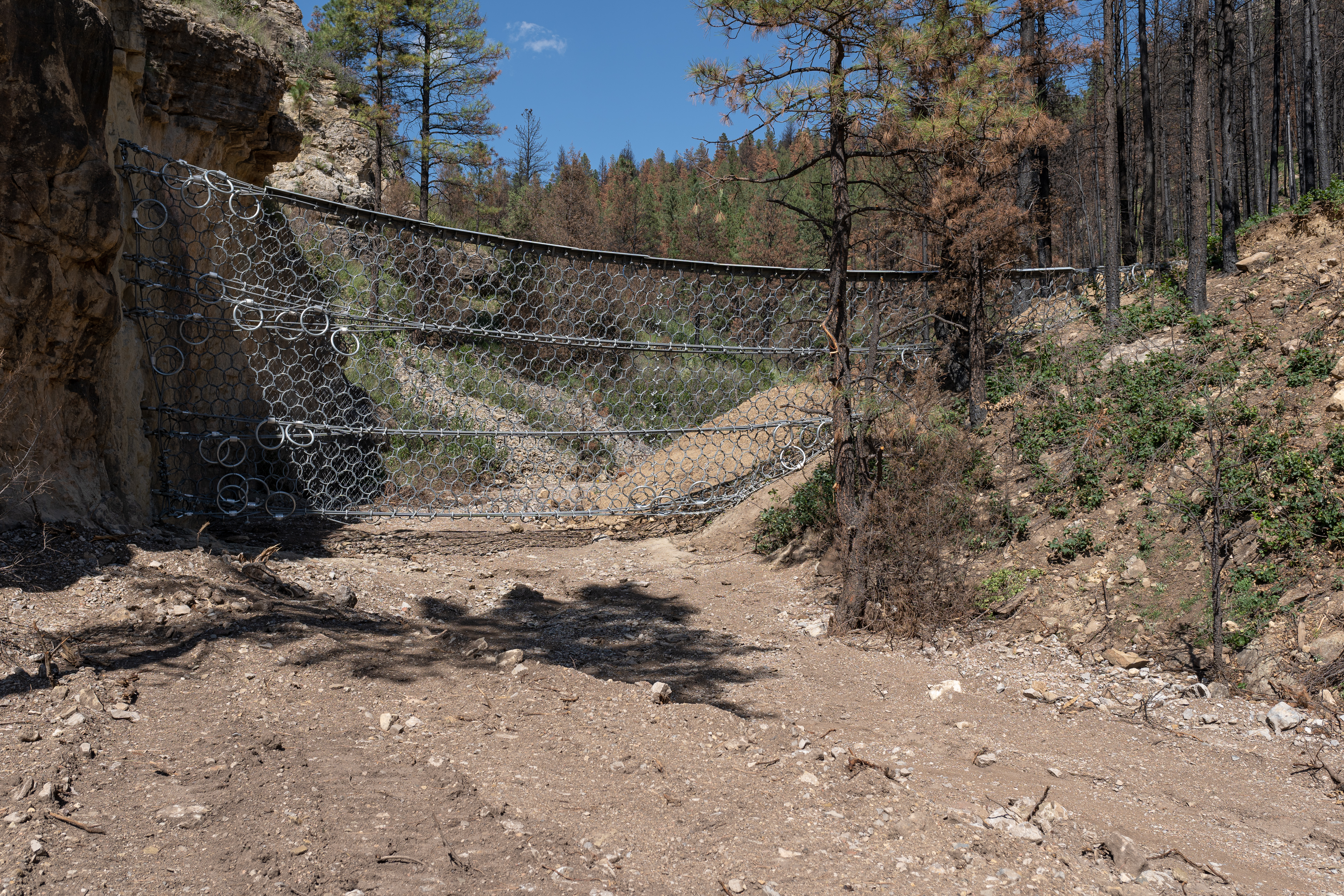
A heavy gauge metal barrier protects Forest Road 263 and the canyon west of Montezuma, New Mexico, added as a method of flood and debris control following the fire.

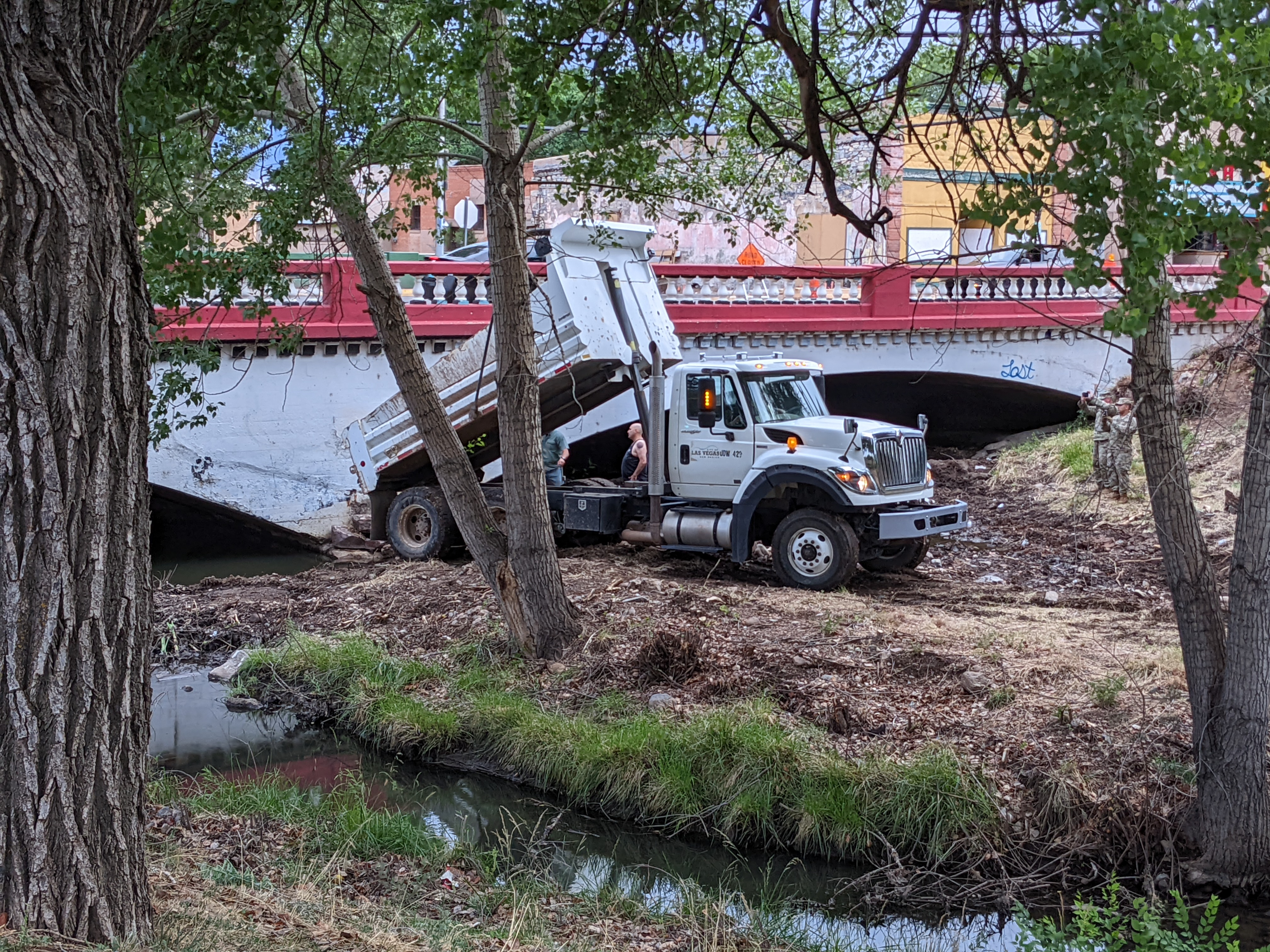
Workers from the city of Las Vegas, New Mexico dumping stone and earth to form a breaker to reinforce a bridge from potentially hazardous post-fire flooding of the Gallinas creek.

No fatalities were reported as a result of the Calf Canyon/Hermits Peak Fire. However, hundreds of structures were damaged or destroyed. The Southwest Coordination Center says 899 structures were destroyed in the fire, and a further 84 damaged. Governor of New Mexico Michelle Lujan Grisham said on May 17 that although she lacked hard figures, the number of homes/structures destroyed could be between 1,000 and 1,500. After the two fires merged during the April 22 catastrophic wind event, 277 structures were reported destroyed, including 166 homes. A breakdown of the buildings burned after that point is not yet available.

Governor Grisham reported that as of May 17, 2,006 people had applied for federal aid through FEMA and 446 people had received it, totaling $612,000.

=== Closures and evacuations ===
At one point approximately 15,500 New Mexico households were forced to evacuate, according to The Washington Post. Multiple communities were threatened, including Mora, Cleveland, and Las Vegas (not to be confused with Las Vegas, Nevada).

The fire caused the closure of the entire Pecos/Las Vegas Ranger District of the Santa Fe National Forest, as well as multiple state parks. These included Mesilla Valley State Park, Coyote Creek State Park, Morphy Lake State Park, Storrie Lake State Park, and Pecos Canyon State Park.

On May 19, officials closed three of New Mexico's five national forests—Santa Fe National Forest, Carson National Forest, and the Cibola National Forest—as a result of the already-burning fires and the potential for future ignitions during the ongoing extreme fire danger. The forests were set to reopen July 18, 2022, closer to the arrival of monsoon moisture, although the closures could be rescinded earlier, according to the USFS. On May 23, the USFS announced that effective 8 a.m. on May 25, the Lincoln National Forest was also closed until at latest July 30.

=== Environmental impacts ===
Smoke from the fire, in addition to the Cerro Pelado Fire, the Cooks Peak Fire, and the Black Fire, which burned simultaneously with the Calf Canyon/Hermits Peak Fire, contributed to poor air quality throughout northern New Mexico.

The fire also impacted the Gallinas watershed, which supplies water to the community of Las Vegas. Ash that enters the water system could make the water untreatable, forcing the town to rely on water supplies temporarily diverted and stored in reservoirs. At one point the town had less than 20 days of clean water left, and despite proposed stopgap solutions the only long-term fix proposed is replacing the town's entire water filtration system, at a potential cost of $100 million.

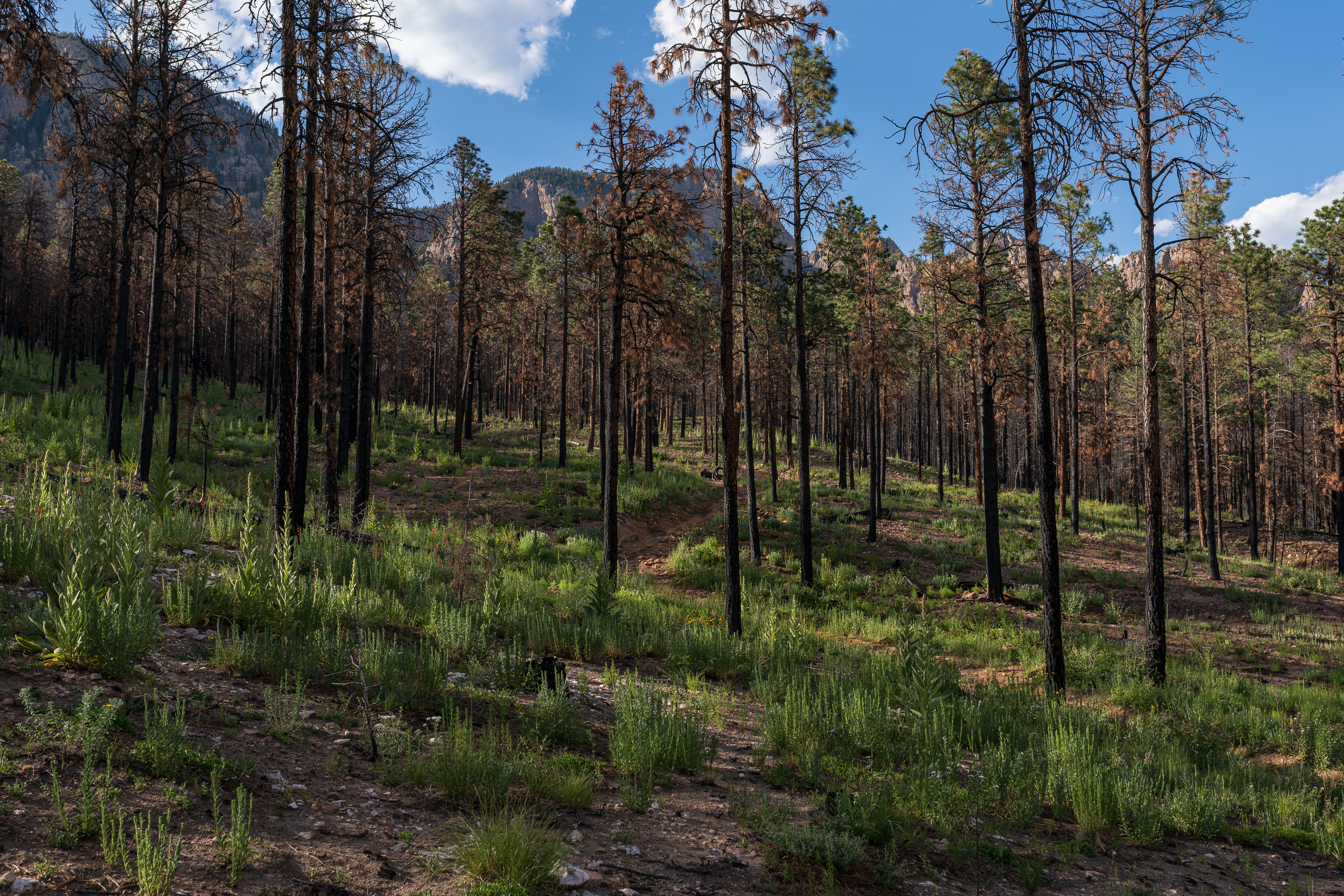
Partially burned forest along trail 223 in the Pecos Wilderness. Hermits Peak is visible in the distance

=== Cultural impacts ===
The Calf Canyon/Hermits Peak Fire "[burned] down a way of life that's lasted hundreds of years," according to Rob Martinez, New Mexico's state historian, who referred to a number of rural, isolated Hispanic communities, settlements, and family homesteads whose history in the state stretches back centuries to when the region was the northern periphery of the Spanish Empire in the Americas. Hispanic people account for approximately 80% of the population in both San Miguel and Mora Counties.

== Political repercussions ==
=== Blame for fire origin ===
The Hermits Peak Fire's origin as an escaped prescribed burn made assigning responsibility for the Calf Canyon/Hermits Peak Fire and other escaped prescribed burns the subject of political debate. A U.S. Forest Service official apologized on behalf of the agency for causing the wildfire on April 11, at which point the Hermits Peak Fire was less than 1,300 acres and had destroyed no structures. During a May 3 news briefing on the Calf Canyon/Hermits Peak Fire, Governor of New Mexico Michelle Lujan Grisham said the federal government needed to be held accountable for the wildfire, saying "We should expect restitution and direct investment from the feds." Grisham also signaled a desire for broader policy changes surrounding prescribed burns, declaring in the same May 3 news briefing that "New Mexico is going to work diligently to make sure the feds have a whole new set of rules that keep us safer." The discussion came as the Biden administration laid out plans to increase controlled burns, among forest thinning and other tactics, as part of a 50-billion-dollar program to lessen wildfire danger. Governor Grisham also referenced the 2000 Cerro Grande Fire, which was likewise the result of an escaped prescribed burn conducted by federal personnel and also destroyed hundreds of structures.

Member of Congress Theresa Leger Fernandez, the representative for New Mexico's 3rd congressional district, sent a letter to United States Forest Service Chief Randy Moore in the first week of May, saying she was "shocked that the Forest Service would perform a prescribed burn during these conditions." The letter called for an internal investigation of the Las Dispensas prescribed burn, a review of the Service's protocols for prescribed burns, and an admission of responsibility for the Hermits Peak Fire.

The USFS defended the decision to begin the prescribed burn and the practice of prescribed burning in general, and said it was conducting a review of the Las Dispensas prescribed burn.

=== Relief and recovery ===
On May 4, President Biden declared a major disaster in the state in response to the multiple wildfires. On May 9, Secretary of Health and Human Services Xavier Becerra declared a public health emergency in New Mexico beginning on April 5, as a result of the Calf Canyon/Hermits Peak Fire and other blazes.

On May 11, the Democratic members of New Mexico's congressional delegation (including Senators Martin Heinrich and Ben Ray Luján and Representatives Teresa Leger Fernández and Melanie Stansbury) introduced the Hermits Peak Fire Assistance Act, which would require the Federal Emergency Management Agency (FEMA) to "design and administer a program for fully compensating those who suffered personal injury, property losses, business and financial losses resulting from the Hermit's Peak Fire", through a new 'Office of Hermits Peak Fire Claims'.

On June 11, President Joe Biden visited New Mexico to get updates on the Calf Canyon/Hermits Peak fire with local and state officials including Governor Michelle Lujan Grisham at the New Mexico state emergency operation center located in Santa Fe. President Biden announced in the meeting that the U.S. Government would cover 100% of costs caused by the Calf Canyon/Hermits Peak fire. On July 12, the U.S. Department of Agriculture's Natural Resources Conservation Service announced it would direct more than $133 million in funding from the Infrastructure Investment and Jobs Act towards covering 100% of post-wildfire recovery efforts, including aerial seeding and other programs.

State legislators continued to pressure for more clarity on who would bear the financial impacts for the wildfire. One state senator suggested suing the federal government in order to get financial aid for the recovery effort, saying that the state should "tell the government this is the way the cow is going to eat the cabbage today, and if you don't like it, we'll see you in court."

On September 30, 2022, the Hermits Peak Fire Assistance Act (“HPFAA”) was signed into law by President Biden. The lawsuit was dropped, but relief efforts by FEMA were inadequate due to policies and procedures more appropriate to flood and hurricane disasters than to fires. Despite being made aware of these problems since a G.A.O. report in 2019, FEMA had not implemented the necessary changes.

In December 2023 a new lawsuit was initiated because of FEMA's failures.

== Growth and containment ==
Acreage and containment figures here are for the Hermits Peak Fire alone until April 23, when it merged with the smaller Calf Canyon Fire. The graph ends after the last day of fire acreage growth, though the fire was not officially declared contained until many weeks later and suppression repair activities continued for months.

Fire containment status Gray: contained; Red: active; %: percent contained;
Date	Area burned acres (km^{2})	Containment
April 6	100 (0)	Hermits Peak Fire starts
April 7	150 (1)	
April 8	350 (1)	
April 9	350 (1)	Calf Canyon Fire starts
April 10	540 (2)	
April 11	728 (3)	
April 12	1,908 (8)	
April 13	6,276 (25)	
April 14	7,077 (29)	
April 15	7,081 (29)	
April 16	7,371 (30)	
April 17	7,514 (30)	
April 18	7,545 (31)	
April 19	7,581 (31)	
April 20	7,573 (31)	
April 21	7,573 (31)	
April 22	7,573 (31)	Calf Canyon and Hermits Peak fires combine
April 23	42,341 (171)	
April 24	54,004 (219)	
April 25	56,478 (229)	
April 26	60,173 (244)	
April 27	61,470 (249)	
April 28	63,720 (258)	
April 29	65,824 (266)	
April 30	75,280 (305)	
May 1	103,908 (421)	
May 2	120,653 (488)	
May 3	145,854 (590)	
May 4	160,104 (648)	
May 5	165,276 (669)	
May 6	168,009 (680)	
May 7	170,665 (691)	
May 8	176,273 (713)	
May 9	189,767 (768)	
May 10	203,920 (825)	
May 11	236,939 (959)	
May 12	259,810 (1,051)	
May 13	270,447 (1,094)	
May 14	279,868 (1,133)	
May 15	288,942 (1,169)	
May 16	298,060 (1,206)	
May 17	299,565 (1,212)	
May 18	301,971 (1,222)	
May 19	303,341 (1,228)	
May 20	303,701 (1,229)	
May 21	308,971 (1,250)	
May 22	310,016 (1,255)	
May 23	311,148 (1,259)	
May 24	311,148 (1,259)	
May 25	311,148 (1,259)	
May 26	312,057 (1,263)	
May 27	312,230 (1,264)	
May 28	314,228 (1,272)	
May 29	314,750 (1,274)	
May 30	315,223 (1,276)	
May 31	315,627 (1,277)	
June 1	315,830 (1,278)	
June 2	316,353 (1,280)	
June 3	316,971 (1,283)	
June 4	317,138 (1,283)	
June 5	317,571 (1,285)	
June 6	317,920 (1,287)	
June 7	318,172 (1,288)	
June 8	318,599 (1,289)	
June 9	318,599 (1,289)	
June 10	319,841 (1,294)	
June 11	320,009 (1,295)	
June 12	320,333 (1,296)	
June 13	320,495 (1,297)	
June 14	325,340 (1,317)	
June 15	335,069 (1,356)	
June 16	336,638 (1,362)	
June 17	340,980 (1,380)	
June 18	341,314 (1,381)	
June 19	341,424 (1,382)	
June 20	341,471 (1,382)	
June 21	341,471 (1,382)	
June 22	341,471 (1,382)	
June 23	341,471 (1,382)	
June 24	341,735 (1,383)	

== See also ==
- Black Fire (2022), 2nd largest fire in state history
- Whitewater-Baldy complex Fire. was the largest in state history until the Black Fire and Calf Canyon/Hermits Peak
- 2022 New Mexico wildfires
- 2022 California wildfires
