= Katie's Law =

Federal law in the US

Katie's Law, also known as the Katie Sepich Enhanced DNA Collection Act of 2010, is a federal law to provide funding to states to implement minimum and enhanced DNA collection processes for felony arrests. The bill is named after Katie Sepich, who was brutally attacked outside of her New Mexico home in August 2003. She was raped, strangled, her body set on fire, and abandoned at an old dump site.

== Summary ==
Katie's attacker's skin and blood were found under her fingernails. This DNA profile was sent to the Combined DNA Index System (CODIS) where officials hoped a match would be made. A DNA match identified Gabriel Adrian Avila, who had been arrested in November 2003 for aggravated burglary and was serving time in the New Mexico Corrections System since November 2004. After being confronted with his DNA evidence, Avila subsequently confessed to the murder of Sepich.

The experience of Katie's parents, Jayann and Dave Sepich, in bringing Katie's killer to justice motivated them to advocate for legislation that would expand the use of DNA to arrest and convict criminals:

Jayann and Dave Sepich, Katie's parents, began researching the role of DNA in solving crimes. At first they just wanted to find and punish the person who had murdered their daughter; but as they learned more about how DNA can solve crimes, they also learned it could do so much more–it can prevent crimes and save lives.

The proposed legislation encourages states to collect a sample through DNA profiling from individuals who are: arrested for, charged with or indicted for crimes involving murder, manslaughter, sexual assaults, and kidnapping or abduction. The collected samples are included in CODIS which contains more than 5 million records and used by law enforcement agencies. DNA profiling is not the same as full genome sequencing and contains no genetic information. There are over 3 billion markers in the DNA molecule and only 13 of these markers go into CODIS.

== Law's expansion ==
Susana Martinez was the attorney who prosecuted and convicted the killer. While she was District Attorney, Martinez worked to pass legislation that would expand Katie's Law, requiring a DNA sample for all felony arrests. While Governor of New Mexico, Martinez signed the expansion bill into law in April 2011.

== National growth ==
On February 4, 2010, Congressman Harry Teague (D-NM) introduced H.R. 4614. The bill had 11 co-sponsors:

- Rep. Gerry Connolly (D-VA)
- Rep. Martin Heinrich (D-NM)
- Rep. Tim Holden (D-PA)
- Rep. Steve Kagen (D-WI)
- Rep. Suzanne Kosmas (D-FL)
- Rep. Ben Ray Lujan (D-NM)
- Rep. Betsy Markey (D-CO)
- Rep. David Reichert (R-WA)
- Rep. Thomas J. Rooney (R-FL)
- Rep. Adam B. Schiff (D-CA)
- Rep. Anthony Weiner (D-NY)

On May 18, the bill was passed in the House by a vote of 357 to 32.

In the Senate side, S. 3805 was introduced by Sen. Jeff Bingaman (D-NM) on September 20, 2010, and co-sponsored by Sen. Michael Bennet (D-CO), Sen. Charles Schumer (D-NY), Sen. Tom Udall (D-NM). As of 2018, no action has been taken on the bill.

25 states have passed Katie's Law or similar programs:

- Alabama
- Alaska
- Arizona
- Arkansas
- California
- Colorado
- Florida
- Kansas
- Louisiana
- Maryland
- Michigan
- Minnesota
- Mississippi
- Missouri
- New Mexico
- North Carolina
- North Dakota
- Ohio
- Rhode Island
- South Carolina
- South Dakota
- Tennessee
- Texas
- Utah
- Virginia
- Vermont

In an interview aired on America's Most Wanted, President Obama expressed his support for the legislation, saying that "it is the right thing to do," and that "this is where the national registry becomes so important, because what you have is individual states — they may have a database, but if they're not sharing it with the state next door, you've got a guy from Illinois driving over into Indiana, and they're not talking to each other."

== Criticism ==
Some opponents argue that this policy is an invasion of privacy or a violation of civil rights. Others comment that since DNA contains sensitive genetic information it is quite different from fingerprints.

A federal district court, in the United States v. Pool, upheld that the federal statute allowing collection of DNA samples prior to conviction for inclusion in the national DNA database does not represent a violation of constitutional rights. In issuing its ruling, the court specifically held that the collection does not represent a violation of Fourth Amendment rights. The court also dismissed claims of violations of Fifth and Eighth amendment rights.

High courts in Maryland, and Virginia, also ruled that DNA upon arrest does not violate the Fourth Amendment. Maryland later reversed itself.

== See also ==
- Adam Walsh Child Protection and Safety Act
