= 2014 New Mexico gubernatorial election =

- November 4, 2014
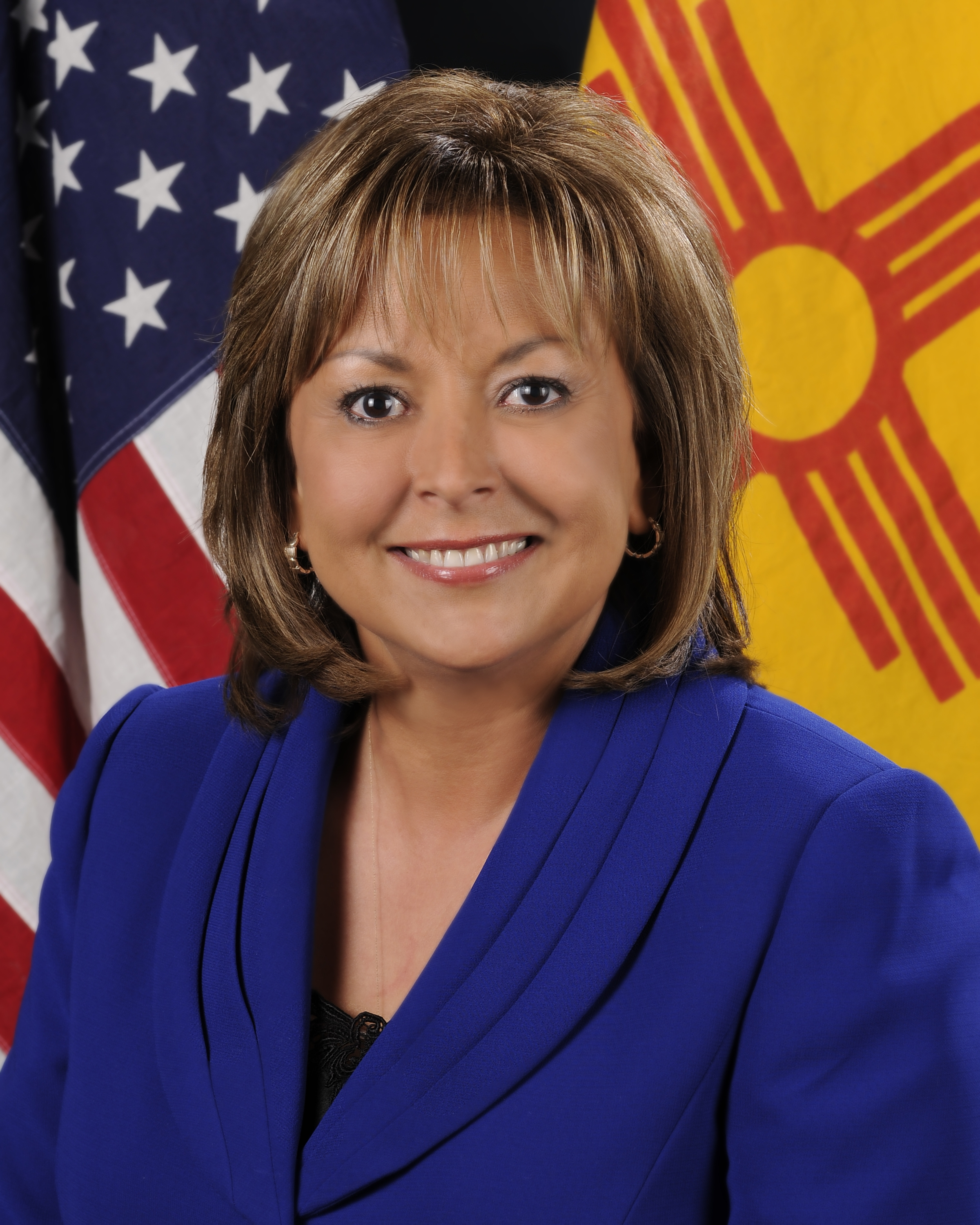

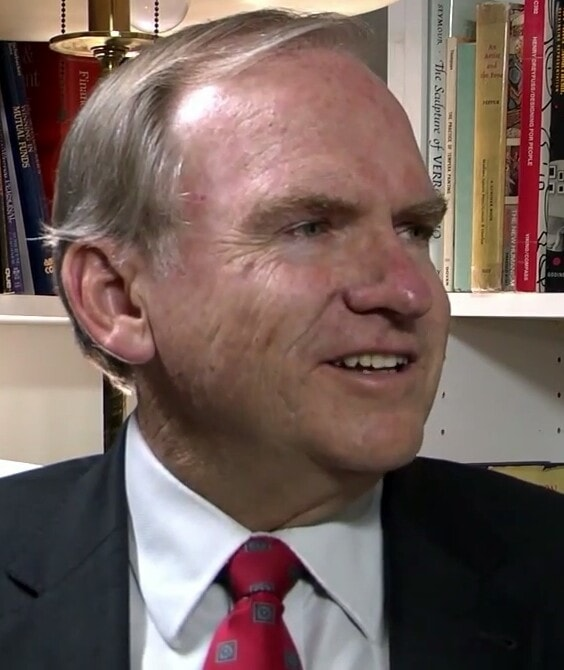
Nominee	Susana Martinez	Gary King
Party	Republican	Democratic
Running mate	John Sanchez	Deb Haaland
Popular vote	293,443	219,362
Percentage	57.22%	42.78%
- Martinez: 50–60% 60–70% 70–80% 80–90% >90% King: 50–60% 60–70% 70–80% 80–90% >90% Tie: 50%
Governor before election
Susana Martínez
Republican
Elected Governor
Susana Martínez
Republican

The 2014 New Mexico gubernatorial election took place on November 4, 2014, to elect the governor of New Mexico. Incumbent Republican Governor Susana Martínez successfully ran for election to a second term in office, defeating Democratic Attorney General Gary King.

This was one of nine Republican-held governorships up for election in a state that Barack Obama won in the 2012 presidential election. Unlike in most states, New Mexico's governor and lieutenant governor are elected in separate primaries. The winning candidates then run together on the same ticket. Primary elections were held on June 3, 2014.

As of 2026, this is the last time that Republicans won a non-judicial statewide election in New Mexico, and stands as the best performance by a Republican gubernatorial candidate in New Mexico history. This is also the last time that the winner of the New Mexico gubernatorial election won a majority of counties.

== Republican primary ==
=== Candidates ===
==== Declared ====
- Susana Martínez, incumbent governor

==== Declined ====
- Gary Johnson, former governor of New Mexico, businessman and Libertarian Party nominee for president in 2012 and 2016

=== Endorsements ===
Susana Martínez

Elected officials

- Chris Christie, governor of New Jersey and chairman of the Republican Governors Association
- Rick Perry, governor of Texas and candidate for president in 2012

=== Results ===
Republican primary results
Party	Candidate	Votes	%
Republican	Susana Martínez (incumbent)	64,413	100.00%
Total votes		67,127	100.00%

== Democratic primary ==
=== Candidates ===
==== Declared ====
- Gary King, attorney general of New Mexico, candidate for governor in 1998 and 2002, nominee for NM-02 in 2004, and son of former Governor Bruce King
- Linda M. Lopez, state senator
- Howie Morales, state senator
- Lawrence Rael, former state executive director of the Farm Service Agency, former CAO of Albuquerque and candidate for lieutenant governor in 2010
- Alan Webber, businessman

==== Declined ====
- Hector Balderas, state auditor of New Mexico and candidate for the U.S. Senate in 2012 (running for attorney general)
- Jeff Bingaman, former U.S. senator
- Joseph Cervantes, state senator
- Tim Keller, state senator (running for state auditor)
- Antonio Maestas, state representative
- Michael S. Sanchez, majority leader of the New Mexico Senate

=== Polling ===
Poll source	Date(s) administered	Sample size	Margin of error	Gary King	Linda M. Lopez	Howie Morales	Lawrence Rael	Alan Webber	Undecided
Journal Poll	May 20–22, 2014	631	± 3.9%	22%	5%	12%	16%	16%	29%
Public Policy Polling	March 20–23, 2014	327	± 5.4%	34%	13%	15%	7%	5%	27%

=== Endorsements ===
Gary King

Elected officials

- Bill Richardson, former governor of New Mexico
- Tom Udall, U.S. senator

Former Candidates

- Linda M. Lopez, state senator
- Howie Morales, state senator
- Lawrence Rael, former state executive director of the Farm Service Agency, former CAO of Albuquerque and candidate for lieutenant governor in 2010
- Alan Webber, businessman

Political activists

- George Lovato Jr., radio co-host of Just Ask George Radio

Organizations

- Pojoaque Pueblo
- Teamsters Local 492
- United Food and Commercial Workers Local 1564
Linda M. Lopez
- Communication Workers of America Local 706
- District 1199NM of the National Union of Hospital and Healthcare Employees
Howie Morales
- Diane Ravitch, education historian, educational policy analyst, and former assistant United States secretary of education
Lawrence Rael
- Pueblo de Cochiti
Alan Webber

Publications

- Santa Fe New Mexican
- Santa Fe Reporter

Organizations

- The Network for Public Education
- National Education Association-NM
- Progressive Leaders Fund-NM

Elected leaders and former public servants

- Steve Fischmann, former state senator
- Carlos Gallegos, former San Miguel County commissioner
- John M. Garcia, former secretary of veterans affairs
- LeRoy Garcia, former San Miguel County Commission chairman
- Eric Griego, former state senator
- Joey Herrera, Las Vegas City councilor & mayor pro tem
- Kathy Holian, Santa Fe County commissioner
- John Hooker, former mayor of Los Ranchos
- Nicolas T. Leger, San Miguel County commissioner
- Patricia Madrid, former New Mexico attorney general
- John Muñoz, former chair of the Doña Ana Hispano Chamber of Commerce
- John Olivas, Mora County Commission chairman
- Robert Shilling, former NM State Police chief
- Nathan Small, Las Cruces city councilor
- Jeff Steinborn, state representative, District 35
- Mimi Stewart, state representative, District 21
- Rebecca Wurzburger, former Santa Fe city councilor
- Wendy York, former district court judge

=== Results ===
Results by county: King: 30–40%; 40–50%; 50–60%; Webber: 30–40%; 50–60%; Rael: 30–40%; Morales: 30–40%; 40–50%; 60–70%; 80–90%

Democratic primary results
Party	Candidate	Votes	%
Democratic	Gary K. King	43,918	35.03%
Democratic	Alan Webber	28,406	22.66%
Democratic	Lawrence Rael	24,878	19.84%
Democratic	Howie Morales	17,863	14.25%
Democratic	Linda M. Lopez	10,288	8.21%
Democratic	Mario J. Martinez (write-in)	16	0.01%
Democratic	Phillip George Chavez (write-in)	2	0.00%
Total votes		125,371	100.00%

== General election ==
=== Candidates ===
- Gary King (Democratic), attorney general of New Mexico
- Susana Martínez (Republican), incumbent governor of New Mexico

=== Predictions ===
Source	Ranking	As of
The Cook Political Report	Likely R	November 3, 2014
Sabato's Crystal Ball	Safe R	November 3, 2014
Rothenberg Political Report	Safe R	November 3, 2014
Real Clear Politics	Likely R	November 3, 2014

=== Polling ===
Poll source	Date(s) administered	Sample size	Margin of error	Susana Martínez (R)	Gary King (D)	Other	Undecided
Research & Polling Inc.*	October 21–23, 2014	614	± 4%	53%	38%	—	9%
CBS News/NYT/YouGov*	October 16–23, 2014	962	± 6%	50%	38%	0%	12%
Public Opinion Strategies*	October 5–7, 2014	500	± 4.38%	55%	36%	—	9%
Gravis Marketing	September 27 – October 1, 2014	727	± 4%	48%	44%	—	8%
CBS News/NYT/YouGov	September 20 – October 1, 2014	1,093	± 4%	48%	41%	2%	9%
Rasmussen Reports*	September 22–23, 2014	830	± 4%	50%	37%	6%	6%
Research & Polling Inc.*	September 9–11, 2014	603	± 4%	54%	36%	—	10%
CBS News/NYT/YouGov	August 18 – September 2, 2014	1,096	± 4%	48%	43%	2%	7%
Research & Polling Inc.*	August 12–14, 2014	606	± 4%	50%	41%	—	9%
CBS News/NYT/YouGov*	July 5–24, 2014	931	± 3.6%	51%	44%	3%	2%
Rasmussen Reports	July 21–22, 2014	860	± 4%	43%	43%	7%	7%
Lake Research Partners^	July 7–10, 2014	600	± 4%	45%	39%	—	15%
Public Opinion Strategies*	June 24–26, 2014	600	± 4%	54%	38%	—	8%
BWD Global*	June 10–11, 2014	1,526	± 2.5%	53%	40%	—	7%
Public Policy Polling	March 20–23, 2014	674	± 3.8%	47%	42%	—	11%
Public Policy Polling	July 13–16, 2012	724	± 3.6%	51%	39%	—	10%

Hypothetical polling

Poll source	Date(s) administered	Sample size	Margin of error	Susana Martínez (R)	Hector Balderas (D)	Other	Undecided
Public Policy Polling	July 13–16, 2012	724	± 3.6%	50%	37%	—	13%

Poll source	Date(s) administered	Sample size	Margin of error	Susana Martínez (R)	Diane Denish (D)	Other	Undecided
Public Policy Polling	June 23–26, 2011	732	± 3.6%	53%	44%	—	4%

Poll source	Date(s) administered	Sample size	Margin of error	Susana Martínez (R)	Linda M. Lopez (D)	Other	Undecided
Public Policy Polling	March 20–23, 2014	674	± 3.8%	50%	36%	—	15%

Poll source	Date(s) administered	Sample size	Margin of error	Susana Martínez (R)	Howie Morales (D)	Other	Undecided
Public Policy Polling	March 20–23, 2014	674	± 3.8%	48%	34%	—	17%

Poll source	Date(s) administered	Sample size	Margin of error	Susana Martínez (R)	Lawrence Rael (D)	Other	Undecided
Public Policy Polling	March 20–23, 2014	674	± 3.8%	47%	36%	—	17%

Poll source	Date(s) administered	Sample size	Margin of error	Susana Martínez (R)	Allan Weber (D)	Other	Undecided
Public Policy Polling	March 20–23, 2014	674	± 3.8%	48%	32%	—	20%

Poll source	Date(s) administered	Sample size	Margin of error	Susana Martínez (R)	Walter White	Other	Undecided
Public Policy Polling	March 20–23, 2014	674	± 3.8%	52%	26%	—	23%

- * Internal poll for Susana Martínez campaign
- ^ Internal poll for Gary King campaign

=== Results ===
2014 New Mexico gubernatorial election
Party	Candidate	Votes	%	±%
Republican	Susana Martinez (incumbent)	293,443	57.22%	+3.94%
Democratic	Gary K. King	219,362	42.78%	−3.77%
Majority		74,081	14.45%	
Total votes		512,805	100.00%	
Republican hold		Swing	+7.71%	

==== By county ====
Martinez was the first Republican to carry Grant County since Edwin L. Mechem in 1950, the first Republican to carry McKinley County since Mechem in 1958, and the first Republican to ever carry Cibola County since its establishment in 1981.

County	Susana Martinez Republican		Gary K. King Democratic		Margin		Total votes cast
County	#	%	#	%	#	%	Total votes cast
Bernalillo	93,442	54.98%	76,500	45.02%	16,942	9.97%	169,942
Catron	1,413	82.39%	302	17.61%	1,111	64.78%	1,715
Chaves	10,094	77.62%	2,911	22.38%	7,183	55.23%	13,005
Cibola	3,296	58.00%	2,387	42.00%	909	16.00%	5,683
Colfax	2,806	65.91%	1,451	34.09%	1,355	31.83%	4,257
Curry	5,628	70.67%	2,336	29.33%	3,292	41.34%	7,964
De Baca	615	77.07%	183	22.93%	432	54.14%	798
Doña Ana	22,161	53.61%	19,178	46.39%	2,983	7.22%	41,339
Eddy	9,046	77.80%	2,581	22.20%	6,465	55.60%	11,627
Grant	4,965	54.43%	4,157	45.57%	808	8.86%	9,122
Guadalupe	1,105	58.96%	769	41.04%	336	17.93%	1,874
Harding	349	67.24%	170	32.76%	179	34.49%	519
Hidalgo	1,001	67.73%	477	32.27%	524	35.45%	1,478
Lea	7,070	77.80%	2,017	22.20%	5,053	55.61%	9,087
Lincoln	4,904	79.26%	1,283	20.74%	3,621	58.53%	6,187
Los Alamos	4,773	60.41%	3,128	39.59%	1,645	20.82%	7,901
Luna	3,169	65.35%	1,680	34.65%	1,489	30.71%	4,849
McKinley	7,465	50.24%	7,393	49.76%	72	0.48%	14,858
Mora	962	45.48%	1,153	54.52%	-191	-9.03%	2,115
Otero	9,825	76.71%	2,983	23.29%	6,842	53.42%	12,808
Quay	1,820	67.96%	858	32.04%	962	35.92%	2,678
Rio Arriba	4,490	44.28%	5,651	55.72%	-1,161	-11.45%	10,141
Roosevelt	2,534	66.97%	1,250	33.03%	1,284	33.93%	3,784
San Juan	22,461	74.97%	7,497	25.03%	14,964	49.95%	29,958
San Miguel	3,247	40.58%	4,755	59.42%	-1,508	-18.85%	8,002
Sandoval	23,805	61.89%	14,661	38.11%	9,144	23.77%	38,466
Santa Fe	15,702	32.47%	32,658	67.53%	-16,956	-35.06%	48,360
Sierra	2,684	72.72%	1,007	27.28%	1,677	45.43%	3,691
Socorro	3,050	57.41%	2,263	42.59%	787	14.81%	5,313
Taos	3,695	34.73%	6,943	65.27%	-3,248	-30.53%	10,638
Torrance	3,038	65.57%	1,595	34.43%	1,443	31,15%	4,633
Union	984	70.79%	406	29.21%	578	41.58%	1,390
Valencia	11,844	63.60%	6,779	36.40%	5,065	27.20%	18,623
Total	293,443	57.22%	219,362	42.78%	74,081	14.45%	512,805

Counties that flipped from Democratic to Republican

- Cibola (largest city: Grants)
- Grant (largest city: Silver City)
- McKinley (largest city: Gallup)

==== By congressional district ====
Martinez won all three congressional districts, including two that elected Democrats.

District	Martinez	King	Representative
1st	55.36%	44.64%	Michelle Lujan Grisham
2nd	65.39%	34.61%	Steve Pearce
3rd	52.46%	47.54%	Ben Ray Luján
