= 2022 New Mexico wildfires =

Natural disasters in the USA

- Satellite imagery from GOES-16 shows smoke plumes from multiple wildfires in northern New Mexico moving east into Texas during a wind event on April 29, 2022.

Statistics
- Total area: 899,453 acres (363,996 ha)

Impacts
- Deaths: 2
- Cost: Unknown

The 2022 New Mexico wildfire season were a series of wildfires which burnt throughout the U.S. state of New Mexico. As of December 13, 2022, 904,422 acres (366,007 ha) had burned across the state. The burned acreage figure for 2022 is well above the 1995-2015 average of approximately 270,000 acres burned annually. with the fire season in the state expected to continue until the advent of the regular North American Monsoon weather pattern throughout the Southwestern United States in the summer.

A number of factors contributed to the severe wildfire season. The majority of the state is experiencing extreme to exceptional drought conditions as part of a broader severe drought in the North American west, fueled by climate change. A reduced 2021-2022 winter snowpack, long periods of higher-than-normal temperatures, and sustained strong winds have resulted in extreme fire conditions and a number of major incidents.

The season has seen a large number of significant wildfires. In early April 2022, the McBride Fire destroyed over 200 structures and killed two people. Since April 2022, the Calf Canyon/Hermits Peak Fire grew to become the largest fire in New Mexico history. It destroyed over 900 structures. Starting in May the Black Fire (2022), and ending in late July, burned in the Gila National Forest northeast of Silver City. The fire consumed some 325,000 acres and became the second-largest wildfire in state history. Thousands of state residents were forced to evacuate for extended periods of times, and the fires produced smoke plumes with severe effects on air quality and health throughout New Mexico.

== Background ==
While "fire season" can vary every year in New Mexico based on weather conditions, most wildfires occur in from early May through June, before the monsoon season. However, there is an increasing fire risk year-round from climate change. Droughts are becoming more common partly from rising temperatures in the state that evaporate water from streams. Unpredictable monsoon levels can increase fire risks. New Mexico is prone to strong winds, and jet stream disruption from climate change can make them stronger. Intense winds contribute to drought, allow wildfires to spread, and dry out vegetation. Unique plant life and fine fuels in the state fuel wildfires, especially in the Eastern New Mexico grasslands. Rising temperatures will reduce snowpack and shorten the snowmelt season which can increase drought and wildfire severity.

Overgrazing and logging in the late 1800s and over 100 years of strict fire suppression affected natural systems of New Mexico led to a growing wildfire risk and intensity. Scientists predict New Mexico's forests will gradually deteriorate, turning into shrublands as wildfires burn the forests.

== List of wildfires ==
The following is a list of fires that burned more than 1,000 acres (400 ha), produced significant structural damage or casualties, or were otherwise notable.

Name	County	Acres	Start date	Containment date	Notes	Ref
MM 38 Fire	Mora	1,705	February 23, 2022	February 25, 2022	Cause under investigation	
San Luis Fire	Hidalgo	2,958	March 4, 2022	March 10, 2022	Cause under investigation	
Arch Fire	Roosevelt	5,732	March 17, 2022	March 18, 2022	Human caused	
Highway 380 Fire	Lea	17,658	March 29, 2022	March 30, 2022	Caused by powerlines	
Calf Canyon/Hermits Peak Fire	San Miguel, Mora, Taos	341,735	April 6, 2022	August 22, 2022	Hermits Peak Fire (escaped prescribed burn) started April 6. The Calf Canyon Fire (escaped pile burn) started April 19. Merged on April 22. Largest and most destructive fire in state history.	
Collins Fire	Catron	3,030	April 7, 2022	April 11, 2022	Was located in the Reserve Ranger District of the Gila National Forest	
Overflow Fire	Chaves	1,900	April 7, 2022	April 13, 2022	Caused by escaped prescribed burn	
McBride Fire	Lincoln	6,159	April 12, 2022	May 7, 2022	Killed 2 people and destroyed 207 structures. Cause under investigation	
Cooks Peak Fire	Mora, Colfax	59,359	April 17, 2022	May 13, 2022	Human caused	
Buckthorn Fire	Eddy	1,152	April 20, 2022	April 22, 2022	Human caused	
Cerro Pelado Fire	Sandoval	46,605	April 22, 2022	June 14, 2022	Cause under investigation	
Mitchell Fire	Harding	25,000	April 22, 2022	April 29, 2022	Cause under investigation	
Campbell Road Fire	Union	2,000	April 22, 2022	April 30, 2022	Cause under investigation	
380 Friday Fire	Lea	6,500	April 22, 2022	April 22, 2022	Cause under investigation	
Skiles 429 Fire	Union	1,312	April 29, 2022	May 3, 2022	Cause under investigation	
Bear Trap Fire	Socorro	38,225	May 1, 2022	June 9, 2022	Cause under investigation	
Truck Tire Fire	Roosevelt	1,500	May 2, 2022	May 3, 2022	Human caused	
380 May Fire	Lea	1,833	May 4, 2022	May 5, 2022	Human caused	
Black Fire	Catron, Grant, Sierra	325,136	May 13, 2022	July 27, 2022	Cause under investigation. Now the second-largest fire in modern New Mexico history	
Foster Fire	Hidalgo	10,403	May 29, 2022	???	Cause under investigation	
Midnight Fire	Rio Arriba	4,905	June 9, 2022	July 1, 2022	Lightning	

== See also ==
- 2022 Texas wildfires
- Wildfires in 2022
- 2023 New Mexico wildfires
