= Gary King (politician) =

American attorney and politician

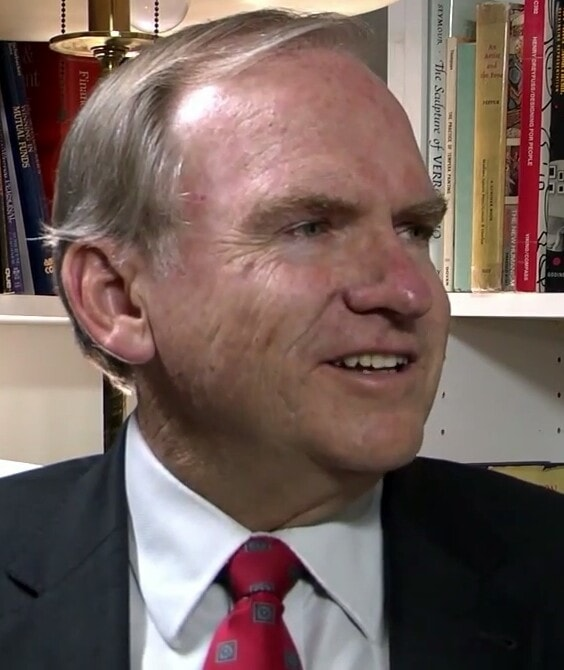

30th Attorney General of New Mexico
- In office January 1, 2007 – January 1, 2015
- Governor: Bill Richardson; Susana Martinez
- Preceded by: Patricia Madrid
- Succeeded by: Hector Balderas

Member of the New Mexico House of Representatives from the 50th district
- In office 1986–1998

Personal details
- Born: Gary Kenneth King; September 29, 1954 (age 71) Stanley, New Mexico, U.S.
- Party: Democratic
- Spouse: Yolanda Jones King (m. 1987)
- Parent(s): Bruce King (father); Alice King (mother)
- Education: New Mexico State University (BS); University of Colorado Boulder (MS, PhD); University of New Mexico (JD)

Gary Kenneth King (born September 29, 1954) is an American lawyer, politician, and energy consultant who served as the 30th attorney general of New Mexico from January 1, 2007, to January 1, 2015. King previously served as an advisor in the United States Department of Energy, a member of the New Mexico House of Representatives, and the Democratic nominee for New Mexico governor in the 2014 election.

In 2026, King appeared in the public release of the Epstein files, which showed a history of coordination with American financier and child sex offender Jeffrey Epstein supporting King's political campaigns. Their relationship stretched from the early 1990s through at least King's 2014 gubernatorial campaign.

== Early life and education ==
King is the son of Bruce King, a three-time Governor of New Mexico, and Alice M. King (née Martin), the former First Lady of New Mexico. He attended New Mexico State University and obtained a bachelor's degree in chemistry in 1976. He received his Ph.D. in organic chemistry from University of Colorado, Boulder in 1980. He then attended the University of New Mexico School of Law, where he earned a Juris Doctor.

== Career ==
In 1984, King formed the law firm of King and Stanley in Moriarty, New Mexico; in 1990, he assumed the position of Corporate General Counsel and Senior Environmental Scientist with Advanced Sciences, Inc., an environmental consulting firm.

From 1986 to 1998, he served as a member of the New Mexico House of Representatives, where he represented the 50th district.

=== U.S. Department of Energy ===
In 1998, he became the policy advisor to the Assistant Secretary for Environmental Management at the United States Department of Energy (DOE) in Washington, D.C. Within a year, he became the department's director of the Office of Worker and Community Transition. While at the DOE, he developed and implemented a program fostering cooperation between federal, state, local and Native American governments to enhance cleanup activities.

=== Attorney General ===
As the 30th Attorney General of New Mexico, King spearheaded the effort to get legislation passed that made it a felony crime to engage in the practice of human trafficking. The United Nations committee invited King to present this legislation as a model for other nations seeking to end the practice of human slavery.

On March 2, 2011, King on behalf of the Respondent, New Mexico, argued before the United States Supreme Court in Bullcoming v. New Mexico. On July 10, 2012, King officially announced that he was seeking the Democratic nomination for Governor of New Mexico.

== Elections ==
=== 1998 gubernatorial election ===
King was a candidate for Governor of New Mexico in the 1998 New Mexico gubernatorial election, placing second in the Democratic primary to then-Mayor of Albuquerque Martin Chavez.

=== 2004 congressional election ===
In 2004, King ran for New Mexico's 2nd congressional district seat, losing to incumbent Republican Steve Pearce. In 2006, King was elected Attorney General of New Mexico. He was re-elected in 2010, winning against Curry County District Attorney Matthew Chandler. King received money from Jeffrey Epstein during his 2004 congressional campaign.

=== 2014 gubernatorial election ===
On June 3, 2014, King won the New Mexico Democratic primary for governor and was immediately endorsed by his opponents; Alan Webber, Lawrence Rael, Howie Morales and Linda Lopez. King unsuccessfully ran against incumbent Republican governor Susana Martinez in the general election. He told fellow Democrats at a fundraiser that Martinez "does not have a Latino heart".

King again received donations from convicted sex offender Epstein, this time totaling $35,600 routed through Epstein businesses. In June 2014, King sent Epstein an email thanking him for a proposed $50,000 personal donation to King's campaign, after which one of Epstein's lawyers suggested routing the funds through a trust to avoid detection. On September 9, 2014, it was reported that King would return the money when news of the donations became public.

=== Relationship with Jeffrey Epstein ===
King's relationship with Epstein dates to at least 1993, which included lunches, use of Epstein's private jet, campaign contributions, and meetings, mostly focusing on Epstein financially supporting King's campaigns. The New Mexico Political Report wrote "King courted a relationship with Epstein through private dining appointments and campaign donations hidden behind corporate fronts to avoid "press coverage" for King..." After reports in February 2026 came out that King flew on Epstein's private jet during his 2014 gubernatorial election, King denied knowing the jet was Epstein's. Emails reviewed and subsequently posted online by The New Mexico Political Report showed King coordinating with Epstein to use the jet to fly to Washington D.C.

In February 2026, King appeared in the publicly released Epstein files.

== Personal life ==
In 1987, he married Yolanda Jones. Jones was the director of Engineering & Technical Management at the Air Force Nuclear Weapons Center (AFNWC) at Kirtland Air Force Base. She also served as chair for the NATO RTO Sensors and Electronics Technology Panel.

Gary King often accompanied his wife to meetings. They traveled to countries such as Taiwan, France, Italy, the Netherlands, Slovenia, Romania, Poland and the Czech Republic.

Legal offices
Preceded by Patricia Madrid	Attorney General of New Mexico; 2007–2015	Succeeded by Hector Balderas
Party political offices
Preceded by Diane Denish	Democratic nominee for Governor of New Mexico; 2014	Succeeded by Michelle Lujan Grisham
