= Yolanda Jones King =

American defense engineer

Yolanda D. Jones King is an American retired laser scientist and defense engineer who worked for many years in the Air Force Research Laboratory. She is a Fellow of the AIAA, a regent of the New Mexico Institute of Mining and Technology (New Mexico Tech) and the wife of Gary King, the former attorney general of New Mexico.

== Education and career ==
King was a chemistry student at the University of New Mexico, where she completed a Ph.D. in 1981. Her doctoral research concerned high-energy chemical lasers.

After working on beam sensing and directed-energy weapons at the Air Force Research Laboratory (AFRL), she moved to the Strategic Defense Initiative Office, became a program manager for several large Ballistic Missile Defense Organization projects, and in 1996 worked as a science and technology advisor to Ron Dellums as a Congressional Fellow. Next, she became technical advisor for space sensing and satellite control at AFRL, including leading the work there on space-based radar. After directing the AFRL International Office in Arlington, Virginia, she returned to the Space Vehicles Directorate of AFRL, where she became technical advisor for space infrared technologies and later technical advisor for the Spacecraft Technology Division.

She retired in 2014, from the Defense Threat Reduction Agency, while continuing to serve as a defense consultant through Engility Corporation. She was nominated as a regent of New Mexico Tech in 2019 by governor Michelle Lujan Grisham, and is the 2023 past president of the New Mexico branch of the International Women's Forum.

== Recognition ==
King was named as a Fellow of the American Institute of Aeronautics and Astronautics in 2003. She is a 2003 recipient of the Zia Award of the University of New Mexico Alumni Association.

== Personal life ==
King's father, James Paul Jones, worked in the United States Navy, and her mother, Lucille Ovela Jones, was an activist in the Democratic Party. She is married to Gary King, the former attorney general of New Mexico. They first met at a campaign event for Gary King's father Bruce King, in 1978, when both were chemistry students. They married in 1987.
