= Chuck Franco =

American politician

First Gentleman of New Mexico
- In role January 1, 2011 – January 1, 2019
- Governor: Susana Martinez
- Preceded by: Barbara Richardson
- Succeeded by: Manuel Cardova (2022)

Personal details
- Born: Charles Anthony Franco; 1955 (age 70–71) Las Cruces, New Mexico, U.S.
- Party: Republican (1995–present)
- Other political affiliations: Democratic (1968–1995)
- Spouse: Susana Martinez (m. 1991; div. 2019)
- Children: Carlo Franco
- Education: New Mexico State University
- Website: Official website

Charles Anthony Franco (born 1955) is an American politician. He was a game warden, police officer, Undersheriff for Doña Ana County, Judge on the Dona Ana County Magistrate Court, and the First Gentleman of New Mexico.

== Early life and education ==
Franco was born and raised in Las Cruces, New Mexico, graduating from Las Cruces High School and earning a degree in criminal justice from New Mexico State University. He has an older brother and younger sister.

== Personal life ==
From 1991 to 2019, Franco was married to former Governor Susana Martínez. Through Franco's job as an undercover investigator, he met Martinez while she was an assistant district attorney. The two married in 1991. Franco has one son, Carlo, who served in the United States Navy. Franco is an advocate for Horses for Heroes and the Youth Diagnostic Development Center in Albuquerque." Franco is a longtime supporter of the Weed and Seed program of the Community Capacity Development Office. Franco is a hunter and fisherman. In 1995, Martinez and he changed their affiliation from the Democratic Party to the Republican Party.

== Career ==
Franco graduated from the police academy in 1978. Franco has been a law enforcement officer for more than 30 years, and served as the Doña Ana County Undersheriff. Franco began working in law enforcement, starting as a game warden. In 1996, Franco ran for a position as Magistrate judge in Doña Ana County. He won, and served for three years. During his career, Franco has worked for "the Las Cruces Police Department, the city's Weed and Seed program and the New Mexico State University Police Department." Franco was a police detective when the Las Cruces Bowling Alley massacre occurred. "As part of the investigation, he had to videotape the scene."

In 1992, Martínez was fired by then District Attorney Greg Valdez. Valdez stated that Martínez brought in a case that Franco was working on. "A potential conflict of interest between Martínez and Franco was an issue in the late 1990s, when she first became district attorney. Franco was a magistrate judge, and some cases being prosecuted by the district attorney's office were assigned to him. Franco was running for re-election in 1996, the same year Martínez first ran for DA. His Democratic opponent and others said there would be a conflict if both were elected. But Franco and Martinez said Franco would recuse himself from all cases involving the DA's office." Franco's relationship with Martinez was twice raised as a concern when, as District Attorney, "she had to decide whether officer-involved shootings were justified."

Franco was a member of Martínez' search team for members of the New Mexico Energy, Minerals and Natural Resources Department.

Presently, Franco is a retired career cop. From January 1, 2011, to January 1, 2019, he served in the role of First Gentleman of New Mexico.

In October 2018 Franco took a job with the Doña Ana County Assessor's office in Las Cruces.

== New Mexico Coalition for Literacy ==
Adult literacy is one of three main causes to which Franco has decided to dedicate his time. New Mexico Coalition for Literacy is "a cause close to his heart from his work in Las Cruces under the federally funded Weed and Seed program to help at-risk youths. There he saw firsthand how improving reading skills helped kids succeed in school." Franco stated that "'supporting the New Mexico Coalition for Literacy also complements Gov. Susana Martinez' push to improve K-12 education in the state'" Franco observed, while working with troubled youth, "that their issues ran beyond behavioral problems. Having parents at home who couldn't read was one of them."

Political offices
| Preceded by Barbara Richardson | First Gentleman of New Mexico; 2011 – 2019 | Succeeded by Vacant |
