= Barbara Richardson =

First Lady of New Mexico

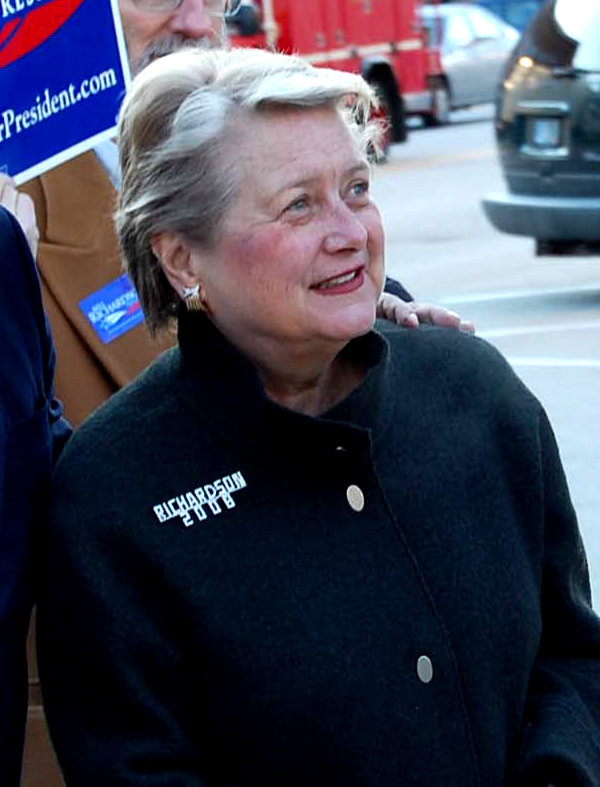
- Richardson in 2007

First Lady of New Mexico
- In role January 1, 2003 – January 1, 2011
- Governor: Bill Richardson
- Preceded by: Denise Johnson
- Succeeded by: Chuck Franco (First Gentleman)

Personal details
- Born: Barbara Flavin; March 25, 1949 (age 77) Gardner, Massachusetts, U.S.
- Spouse: Bill Richardson (m. 1972; died 2023)
- Education: Wheaton College (BA)

Barbara Richardson (née Flavin; born March 25, 1949) is the former First Lady of New Mexico and widow of Bill Richardson, the 9th United States Secretary of Energy.

== Early life and education ==
Barbara Flavin was born in Gardner, Massachusetts, March 25, 1949, the daughter of Evelyn Mary (née Kaplan) and John Francis Flavin. She graduated magna cum laude from Wheaton College in 1971, where she earned a Bachelor of Arts degree in Psychology.

== Career ==
After dropping out of college, Richardson worked in outpatient services at Massachusetts General Hospital before meeting Bill Richardson. As First Lady of New Mexico, she formed the New Mexico Immunizations Coalition in April 2003. The coalition of doctors and state officials created a registry that medical providers can check and see which immunizations children need, as well as a color-coded schedule with baby pictures indicating the appropriate ages for vaccines to help parents track their children's care.

She is also the New Mexico chairperson of Read Across America. Also active in efforts to combat domestic violence, she helped to open a shelter for abused spouses in a corner of the state where such services had been nonexistent. In addition, she runs an annual bowling fundraiser for Big Brothers Big Sisters Mountain Region.
