= McBride Fire =

2022 wildfire in Lincoln County, New Mexico

- Part of the 2022 New Mexico wildfires
- Date: April 12, 2022 - May 7, 2022
- Location: Lincoln National Forest, New Mexico
- Coordinates: 33.333°N 105.635°W

Statistics
- Burned area: 6,159 acres (2,492 ha)

Impacts
- Deaths: 2
- Structures destroyed: 207

Ignition
- Cause: Fallen tree on power lines

Map
- Location in New Mexico

The McBride Fire was a destructive wildfire that burned in the Lincoln National Forest near the community of Ruidoso in Lincoln County, New Mexico, in the United States as part of the 2022 New Mexico wildfire season. The fire was named after McBride Road, near where it ignited on April 12, 2022. The McBride Fire burned 6,159 acres (2,492 ha), and was fully contained on May 7, 2022. The official cause of the fire was determined to be a drought-stressed tree falling on power lines, which quickly ignited the dry surroundings.

== Events ==
The fire was first reported around 2:30 PM on Tuesday, April 12, 2022. It was driven by a period of strong winds, with gusts of up to 70 miles per hour and sustained winds of 50 to 60 miles per hour, as well as extreme dryness. These winds prevented the use of aircraft against the fire on April 12, but better conditions allowed fixed-wing aircraft, including Very Large Air Tankers (VLATs), and helicopters to help fight the blaze on subsequent days. On April 17, all evacuations were lifted, and on May 7, the fire was declared 100% contained.

== Impacts ==
Two fatalities were reported on April 13 by the New Mexico Department of Public Safety, after an elderly couple were reported missing by family members following a structure fire at their residence the day the fire started. In addition to the two deaths, the McBride Fire destroyed 207 structures, and multiple outbuildings.
