= Cooks Peak Fire =

2022 New Mexico wildfire

- Part of the 2022 New Mexico wildfires
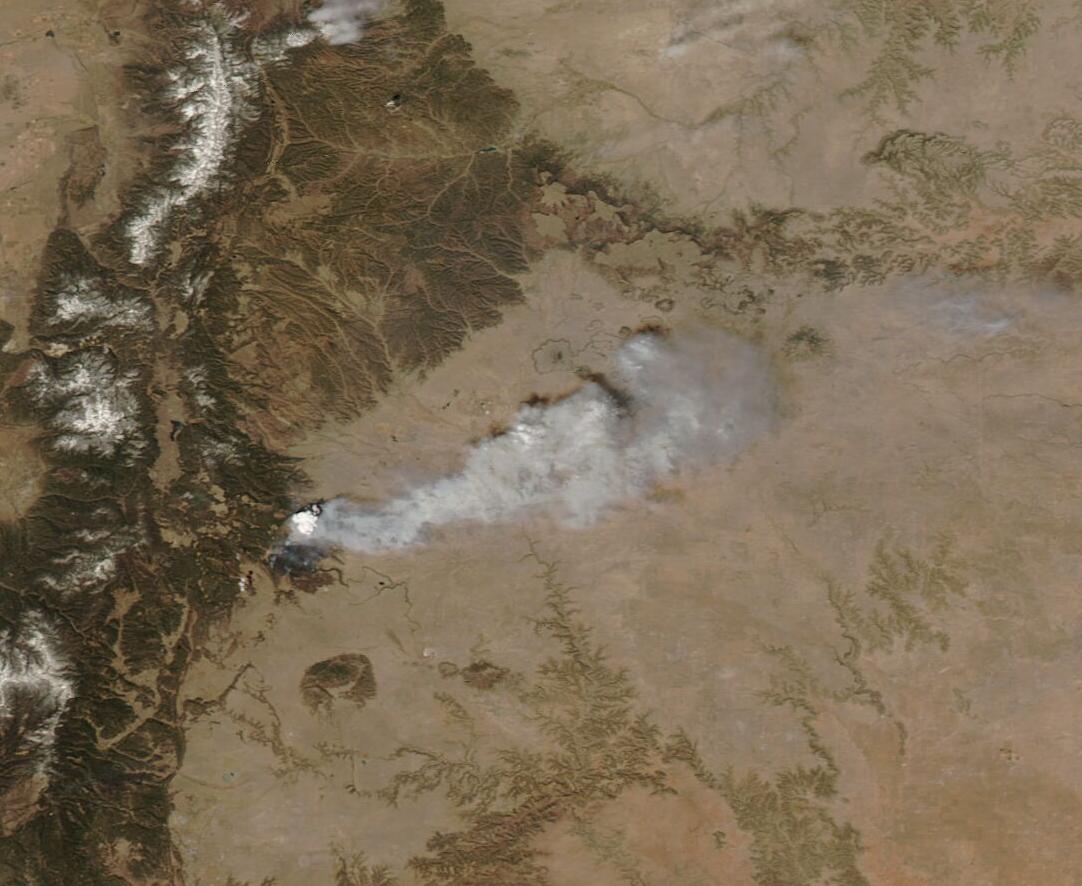
- In a satellite image of the Cooks Peak Fire on April 21, a white pyrocumulus cloud is visible
- Date: April 17 – May 13, 2022
- Location: Mora County & Colfax County, New Mexico, United States
- Coordinates: 36.243°N 105.038°W

Statistics
- Burned area: 59,359 acres (24,022 ha)
- Land use: Ponderosa Pine, Oak Brush, Grass

Impacts
- Deaths: 0
- Structures lost: 1

Ignition
- Cause: Human-caused, under investigation

Map
- The location of the fire in New Mexico.

The Cooks Peak Fire was a wildfire that burned north of the community of Ocate in Mora County and Colfax County, in the U.S. state of New Mexico, as part of the 2022 New Mexico wildfire season. As of 13 May 2022, the fire burned 59,359 acres (24,022 ha) and was 100% contained on the evening of May 13, 2022. The exact cause of the fire is unknown and under investigation.

== Development ==
=== April ===
The fire was first reported on April 17, 2022, at approximately 4:31 PM MNT. The cause of the fire is currently under investigation. There were 548 firefighting personnel on scene as of April 28, 2022, according to the BSA.

== Containment ==
As of 13 May 2022, the Cooks Peak Fire was fully contained.

== Impact ==
=== Closures and evacuations ===
The Philmont Scout Ranch, just north of the fire, began evacuating staff when the fire rushed north on April 24. As of April 30, 2022, the fire had burned 3,084 acres (1,248 ha) of the scout ranch. Parts of Colfax County were evacuated, as well as the community of Cimarron

== See also ==
- 2022 New Mexico wildfires
- Calf Canyon/Hermits Peak Fire
