= Reeds Peak Lookout Tower =

- U.S. National Register of Historic Places
- Location within New Mexico
- Location: Squeaky Spring, Gila National Forest, Reeds Peak, New Mexico
- Coordinates: 33°08′35″N 107°51′14″W
- Area: less than one acre
- Built: 1929
- MPS: National Forest Fire Lookouts in the Southwestern Region TR
- NRHP reference No.: 87002472
- Added to NRHP: January 28, 1988

The Reeds Peak Lookout Tower, at Squeaky Spring in Gila National Forest, on Reeds Peak, New Mexico, was built in 1929. It was listed on the National Register of Historic Places in 1988.

== Background ==
It is a 48 feet (15 m) high Aermotor steel tower with a 7 by 7 feet (2.1 m × 2.1 m) steel "cab", or cabin. The original cabin was replaced in 1959. In 1988, its original ladder was still in place, but new stairs were added in 1965.
