= SBA ARC Loan Program =

Defunct American government loan program operation 2009-2010

The SBA ARC Loan Program was a United States government program to provide funding for viable small business as part of the American Recovery and Reinvestment Act of 2009. The United States Government had allocated Small Business Administration (SBA) backed funds for small businesses in the United States that met qualification conditions. The program ran until September 16, 2010 when it was closed.

== History ==
Businesses had to have qualifying business loans and had to be experiencing immediate financial hardship. Qualifying recipients of the America’s Recovery Capital (ARC) Loan Program could receive up to $35,000 in short-term relief. Each small business was limited to one ARC loan.

ARC loans could be used to make payments of principal and interest, in full or in part, on one or more existing, qualifying small business loans for up to six months. ARC loans were intended to provide immediate capital to small businesses to make payments (principal and interest) on existing debt and thus allow business owners to sustain and retain jobs.

ARC loans were interest-free to the borrower and carried a 100% guarantee from the SBA. Loan proceeds were provided over a six-month period. Repayment of the ARC loan principal was deferred for 12 months after the last disbursement (18 months from the first disbursement), followed by a repayment period of five years.

Good candidates for ARC loans were small businesses that could show a profitable past but were currently struggling to make loan payments or are just beginning to miss loan payments due to financial hardship.

ARC loans are made by participating commercial SBA lenders. The SBA will pay these banks a monthly interest rate throughout the term of the loan. ARC loans will be offered by some SBA lenders for as long as funding is available or until September 30, 2010, whichever comes first. The program officially ended effective September 16, 2010.

== Eligibility ==
In order to be eligible, a small business had to be established, have financial statements to demonstrate it was profitable in one of the past two years, and be able to project sufficient cash flow to meet current and future loan payments over a two-year period from loan approval. ARC loans were not designed for start-up businesses.

Examples of qualifying loans included business credit card obligations, capital leases, notes payable to vendors or suppliers, Development Company Loan Program (504) first-lien loans, other loans to small businesses made without an SBA guaranty, and loans made by or with an SBA guaranty on or after Feb. 17, 2009. Borrowers with loans that were already severely delinquent or whose past performance or future cash flow projection indicates that the business is not viable were not good candidates for an ARC loan.

== Application ==
ARC Loans were provided by participating commercial lenders and guaranteed by the SBA.
