= List of Oregon ballot measures =

Ballot measures in the U.S. state of Oregon

The list of Oregon ballot measures lists all statewide ballot measures to the present.

In Oregon, the initiative and referendum process dates back to 1902, when the efforts of the Direct Legislation League prompted amending the Oregon Constitution for the first time since 1859. The process of initiative and referendum became nationally known as the Oregon System.

== Types ==
There are three types of ballot measures: initiatives, referendums, and referrals. Initiatives and referendums may be placed on the ballot if their supporters gather enough signatures from Oregon voters; the number of signatures is a percentage based on the number of voters casting ballots in the most recent election for the Governor of Oregon.

Initiative
Any issue may be placed before the voters, either amending the Constitution or revising or adding to the Oregon Revised Statutes. Constitutional initiatives require the signature of eight percent of recent voters to qualify for the ballot; statutory reforms require six percent.
Referendum
The public may act to undo any bill passed by the Oregon Legislative Assembly, by putting a referendum on the ballot. A referendum requires four percent of recent voters to qualify for the ballot.
Legislative referral
The Legislative Assembly may refer any bill it passes to the public for approval, and they must do so for any amendment to the Constitution. Additionally, the Legislative Assembly may refer revisions to the Constitution; a revision differs from an amendment in that it may alter multiple existing provisions of the Constitution.

The constitutional foundation for ballot measures (and legislation produced by the Oregon Legislative Assembly) may be found in Article IV of the Oregon Constitution, and Chapter 250 of the Oregon Revised Statutes relates to initiative and referendum as well.

The Oregon Blue Book, produced by the Oregon government, maintains a list similar to this one.

== 1900s ==
=== 1902 ===
1902 General Election
meas. num	passed	Yes votes	No votes	% Yes	Const. Amd.?	Type	description
1	Yes	62,024	5,668	91.63%	Yes	Leg	Limits Uses Initiative and Referendum

=== 1904 ===
1904 General Election
meas. num	passed	Yes votes	No votes	% Yes	Const. Amd.?	Type	description
1	Yes	45,334	14,031	76.36%	Yes	Leg	Office of State Printer
2	Yes	56,205	16,354	77.46%	No	Init	Direct Primary Nominating Convention Law
3	Yes	43,316	40,198	51.87%	No	Init	Local Option Liquor law

=== 1906 ===
1906 General Election
meas. num	passed	Yes votes	No votes	% Yes	Const. Amd.?	Type	description
1	Yes	43,918	26,758	62.14%	No	Ref	Shall act appropriating money maintaining Insane Asylum, Penitentiary, Deaf-Mute, Blind School, university, Agricultural College, and Normal Schools be approved
2	No	36,902	47,075	43.94%	Yes	Init	Equal Suffrage Constitutional Amendment
3	No	35,297	45,144	43.88%	No	Init	Amendment to local option law giving anti-prohibitionists and prohibitionists equal privileges
4	No	31,525	44,527	41.45%	No	Init	Law to abolish tolls on the Mount Hood and Barlow Road and providing for its ownership by the State
5	Yes	47,661	18,751	71.77%	Yes	Init	Constitutional amendment providing method of amending constitution and applying the referendum to all laws affecting constitutional conventions and amendments
6	Yes	52,567	19,852	72.59%	Yes	Init	Constitutional amendment giving cities and towns exclusive power to enact and amend their charters
7	Yes	63,749	9,571	86.95%	Yes	Init	Constitutional amendment to allow the state printing, binding, and Printers' compensation to be regulated by law at any time
8	Yes	47,678	16,735	74.02%	Yes	Init	Constitutional amendment for the initiative and referendum on local, special, and municipal laws and parts of laws
9	Yes	57,281	16,779	77.34%	No	Init	Bill for a law prohibiting free passes and discrimination by railroad companies and other public service corporations
10	Yes	69,635	6,441	91.53%	No	Init	An act requiring sleeping car companies, refrigerator car companies, and oil companies to pay an annual license upon gross earnings
11	Yes	70,872	6,360	91.77%	No	Init	An act requiring express companies, telegraph companies, and telephone companies to pay an annual license upon gross earnings

=== 1908 ===
1908 General Election
meas. num	passed	Yes votes	No votes	% Yes	Const. Amd.?	Type	description
1	No	19,691	68,892	22.23%	Yes	Leg	To Increase Compensation of Legislators from $120 to $400 Per Session
2	Yes	41,975	40,868	50.67%	Yes	Leg	Permitting Location of State Institutions at Places Other than the State Capitol
3	No	30,243	50,591	37.41%	Yes	Leg	Reorganization System of Courts and Increasing the Number of Supreme Judges from Three to Five
4	Yes	65,728	18,590	77.95%	Yes	Leg	Changing Date of General Elections from June to November
5	Yes	60,443	30,033	66.81%	No	Ref	Giving Sheriffs Control of County Prisoners
6	No	28,856	59,406	32.69%	No	Ref	Requiring Railroads to Give Public Officials Free Passes
7	No	33,507	54,848	37.92%	No	Ref	Appropriating $100,000 for Building Armories
8	Yes	44,115	40,535	52.11%	No	Ref	Increasing Annual Appropriation for University of Oregon from $47,500 to $125,000
9	No	36,858	58,670	38.58%	Yes	Init	Equal Suffrage
10	Yes	46,582	40,720	53.36%	No	Init	Fishery Law Proposed by Fishwheel Operators
11	No	39,442	52,346	42.97%	Yes	Init	Giving Cities Control of Liquor Selling, Poolrooms, Theaters, etc., subject to local option law
12	No	32,066	60,871	34.50%	Yes	Init	Modified Form of Single Tax Amendment
13	Yes	58,381	31,002	65.32%	Yes	Init	Recall Power on Public Officials
14	Yes	69,668	21,162	76.70%	No	Init	Instructing Legislature to Vote for People Choice for United States Senator (see also Seventeenth Amendment to the United States Constitution)
15	Yes	48,868	34,128	58.88%	Yes	Init	Authorizing Proportional Representation Law
16	Yes	54,042	31,301	63.32%	No	Init	Corrupt Practices Act Governing Elections
17	Yes	56,130	30,280	64.96%	No	Init	Fishery Law Proposed by Gillnet Operators
18	Yes	52,214	28,487	64.70%	Yes	Init	Requiring Indictment to Be By Grand Jury
19	Yes	43,948	26,778	62.14%	No	Init	Creating Hood River County

== 1910s ==
1910 General Election
meas. num	passed	Yes votes	No votes	% Yes	Const. Amd.?	Type	description
1	No	35,270	59,065	37.39%	Yes	Init	Permitting female taxpayers to vote
2	Yes	50,134	41,504	54.71%	No	Leg	Establishing branch Insane Asylum in eastern Oregon
3	No	23,143	59,974	27.84%	No	Leg	Calling Convention to revise State Constitution
4	No	24,000	54,252	30.67%	Yes	Leg	Providing separate districts for election of each State Senator and Representative
5	No	37,619	40,172	48.36%	Yes	Leg	Repealing Requirements That All Taxes Shall Be Equal and Uniform
6	No	32,884	46,070	41.65%	Yes	Leg	Permitting Organized Districts to Vote Bonds for Construction of Railroads by Such Districts
7	No	31,629	41,692	43.14%	Yes	Leg	Authorizing Collection of State and County Taxes on Separate Classes of Property
8	No	13,161	71,503	15.54%	No	Ref	Requiring Baker County to pay $1,000 a year to Circuit Judge in addition to his state salary
9	No	22,866	60,951	27.28%	No	Init	Creating Nesmith County from parts of Lane and Douglas
10	Yes	50,191	40,044	55.62%	No	Init	To establish a state Normal school at Monmouth
11	No	17,426	62,016	21.94%	No	Init	Creating Otis County From Parts of Harney, Malheur and Grant
12	No	16,250	69,002	19.06%	No	Init	Annexing Part of Clackamas County to Multnomah
13	No	14,508	64,090	18.46%	No	Init	Creating Williams County From Parts of Lane and Douglas
14	Yes	44,171	42,127	51.18%	Yes	Init	Permitting People of Each County to Regulate Taxation for County Purposes and Abolishing Poll Taxes
15	Yes	53,321	50,779	51.22%	Yes	Init	Giving Cities and Towns Exclusive Power to Regulate Liquor Traffic Within Their Limits
16	Yes	56,258	33,943	62.37%	No	Init	For Protection of Laborers in Hazardous Employment, Fixing Employers' Liability, etc.
17	No	15,664	62,712	19.99%	No	Init	Creating Orchard County From Part of Umatilla
18	No	15,613	61,704	20.19%	No	Init	Creating Clark County From Part of Grant
19	No	40,898	46,201	46.96%	No	Init	To Establish State Normal School at Weston
20	No	14,047	68,221	17.07%	No	Init	To Annex Part of Washington County to Multnomah
21	No	38,473	48,655	44.16%	No	Init	To Establish State Normal School at Ashland
22	No	43,540	61,221	41.56%	Yes	Init	Prohibiting Liquor Traffic
23	No	42,651	63,564	40.16%	No	Init	Prohibiting the Sale of Liquors and Regulating Shipments of Same, and Providing for Search for Liquor
24	No	32,224	51,719	38.39%	No	Init	Creating Board to Draft Employers' Liability Law for Submission to Legislature
25	Yes	49,712	33,397	59.82%	No	Init	Prohibiting Taking of Fish in Rogue River Except With Hook and Line
26	No	17,592	60,486	22.53%	No	Init	Creating Deschutes County Out of Part of Crook
27	No	37,129	42,327	46.73%	No	Init	Bill for General Law Under Which New Counties May Be Created or Boundaries Changed
28	Yes	51,275	32,906	60.91%	Yes	Init	Permitting Counties to Vote Bonds for Permanent Road Improvement
29	Yes	43,353	41,624	51.02%	No	Init	Permitting Voters in Direct Primaries to Express Choice for President and Vice President, to Select Delegates to National Convention and Nominate Candidates for Presidential Electors
30	No	29,955	52,538	36.31%	No	Init	Creating Board of People's Inspectors of Government, Providing for Reports of Board in Official State Gazette to be Mailed to All Registered Voters Bi-monthly
31	No	37,031	44,366	45.49%	Yes	Init	Extending Initiative and Referendum, Making Term of Members of Legislature Six Years, Increasing Salaries, Requiring Proportional Representation in Legislature, Election of President of Senate and Speaker of House Outside of Members, etc.
32	Yes	44,538	39,399	53.06%	Yes	Init	Permitting Three-Fourths Verdict in Civil Cases

=== 1912 ===
1912 General Election
meas. num	passed	Yes votes	No votes	% Yes	Const. Amd.?	Type	description
1	Yes	61,265	57,104	51.76%	Yes	Init	Equal Suffrage Amendment
2	No	50,562	61,644	45.06%	Yes	Leg	Creating Office of Lieutenant Governor
3	No	51,582	56,671	47.65%	Yes	Leg	Divorce of Local and State Taxation
4	No	52,045	54,483	48.86%	Yes	Leg	Permitting Different Tax Rates on Classes of Property
5	Yes	63,881	47,150	57.53%	Yes	Leg	Repeal of County Tax Option
6	No	32,934	70,325	31.89%	Yes	Leg	Majority Rule on Constitutional Amendments
7	Yes	82,981	21,738	79.24%	Yes	Leg	Double Liability on Bank Stockholders
8	Yes	65,985	40,956	61.70%	No	Ref	Statewide Public Utilities Regulation
9	No	26,463	71,239	27.09%	No	Init	Creating Cascade County
10	No	48,701	57,279	45.95%	No	Init	Millage Tax for University and Agricultural College
11	No	35,721	68,861	34.16%	Yes	Init	Majority Rule on Initiated Laws
12	No	49,699	56,713	46.70%	No	Init	County Bond and Road Construction Act—Grange Bill
13	No	23,872	83,846	22.16%	No	Init	Creating State Highway Department—Grange Bill
14	No	34,793	69,542	33.35%	No	Init	Changing Date State Printer Bill Becomes Effective
15	No	16,910	91,995	15.53%	No	Init	Creating Office of Hotel Inspector
16	Yes	64,508	48,078	57.30%	No	Init	Eight-hour Day on Public Works
17	No	48,765	57,293	45.98%	No	Init	Blue Sky law
18	Yes	73,800	37,492	66.31%	No	Init	Relating to Employment of State Prisoners
19	Yes	71,367	37,731	65.42%	No	Init	Relating to Employment of County and City Prisoners
20	No	30,897	75,590	29.01%	No	Init	State Road Bonding Act
21	Yes	59,452	43,447	57.78%	Yes	Init	Limiting State Road Indebtedness
22	No	43,611	60,210	42.01%	No	Init	County Bonding Act
23	Yes	57,258	43,858	56.63%	Yes	Init	Limiting County Road Indebtedness
24	No	40,199	56,992	41.36%	No	Init	Providing Method for Consolidating Cities and Creating New Counties
25	No	52,702	52,948	49.88%	Yes	Init	Income Tax Amendment
26	Yes	60,357	51,826	53.80%	No	Init	Tax Exemption on Household Effects
27	No	42,491	66,540	38.97%	No	Init	Tax Exemption on Moneys and Credits
28	No	38,609	63,839	37.69%	No	Init	Revising Inheritance Tax Laws
29	Yes	58,306	45,534	56.15%	No	Init	Freight Rates Act
30	No	38,568	63,481	37.79%	Yes	Init	County Road Bonding Act
31	No	31,020	71,183	30.35%	Yes	Init	Abolishing Senate; Proxy Voting; U'Rren Constitution
32	No	31,534	82,015	27.77%	Yes	Init	Statewide Single Tax with Graduated Tax Provision
33	No	41,951	64,578	39.38%	No	Init	Abolishing Capital Punishment
34	No	49,826	60,560	45.14%	No	Init	Prohibits Boycotts and Pickets
35	No	48,987	62,532	43.93%	No	Init	Prohibits Use of Public Streets, Parks and Grounds in Cities over 5,000 Without Permit
36	No	29,437	78,985	27.15%	No	Ref	Appropriation for University of Oregon
37	No	27,310	79,376	25.60%	No	Ref	Appropriation for University of Oregon

=== 1913 ===
November 1913 Special Referendum Election
meas. num	passed	Yes votes	No votes	% Yes	Const. Amd.?	Type	description
1	Yes	56,659	40,600	58.26%	No	Ref	State University Building Repair Fund
2	Yes	53,569	43,014	55.46%	No	Ref	University of Oregon New Building Appropriation
3	No	41,767	53,319	43.93%	No	Ref	Sterilization Act
4	Yes	54,179	38,159	58.67%	No	Ref	County Attorney Act
5	Yes	67,814	28,608	70.33%	No	Ref	Workmen's Compensation Act

=== 1914 ===
1914 General Election
meas. num	passed	Yes votes	No votes	% Yes	Const. Amd.?	Type	description
1	Yes	164,879	39,847	80.54%	Yes	Leg	Requiring Voters to be Citizens of the United States
2	No	52,040	143,804	26.57%	Yes	Leg	Creating Office of Lieutenant Governor
3	No	77,392	103,194	42.86%	Yes	Leg	Permitting Certain City and County Boundaries to be Made Identical, and Governments Consolidated
4	No	49,759	135,550	26.85%	Yes	Leg	Permitting State to Create an Indebtedness Not to Exceed Two Percent of Assessed Valuation for Irrigation and Power Projects and Development of Untilled Lands
5	No	59,206	116,490	33.70%	Yes	Leg	Omitting Requirement that "All Taxation Shall Be Equal And Uniform"
6	No	52,362	122,704	29.91%	Yes	Leg	Changing Existing Rule of Uniformity and Equality of Taxation—Authorizing Classification of Property for Taxation Purposes
7	No	84,041	109,643	43.39%	No	Leg	To Establish State Normal School at Ashland
8	Yes	96,116	77,671	55.31%	Yes	Leg	Enabling Incorporated Municipalities to Surrender Charters and To Be Merged in Adjoining City or Town
9	No	87,450	105,345	45.36%	No	Leg	To Establish State Normal School at Weston
10	No	41,087	146,278	21.93%	Yes	Leg	Providing Compensation for Members of Legislature at Five Dollars Per Day
11	No	49,360	167,888	22.72%	Yes	Init	Universal Constitutional Eight Hour Day Amendment
12	No	88,480	120,296	42.38%	No	Init	Eight-hour Day and Room-Ventilation Law for Female Workers
13	No	74,323	107,263	40.93%	No	Init	Nonpartisan Judiciary Bill Prohibiting Party Nominations for Judicial Officers
14	No	65,495	136,193	32.47%	Yes	Init	$1500 Tax Exemption Amendment
15	No	67,128	114,564	36.95%	Yes	Init	Public Docks and Water Frontage Amendment
16	No	67,110	111,113	37.66%	No	Init	Municipal Wharves and Docks Bill
17	Yes	136,842	100,362	57.69%	Yes	Init	Prohibition Constitutional Amendment
18	Yes	100,552	100,395	50.04%	Yes	Init	Abolishing Death Penalty
19	No	59,186	124,943	32.14%	Yes	Init	Specific Personal Graduated Extra-tax Amendment of Article IX, Oregon Constitution
20	No	55,469	120,154	31.58%	No	Init	Consolidating Corporation and Insurance Departments
21	No	92,722	110,404	45.65%	No	Init	Dentistry Bill
22	No	82,841	107,039	43.63%	Yes	Init	County Officers Term Amendment
23	No	34,436	143,468	19.36%	No	Init	A Tax Code Commission Bill
24	No	32,701	143,366	18.57%	No	Init	Abolishing Desert Land Board and Reorganizing Certain State Offices
25	No	39,740	137,116	22.47%	Yes	Init	Proportional Representation Amendment to Oregon Constitution
26	No	62,376	123,429	33.57%	Yes	Init	State Senate Constitutional Amendment
27	No	57,859	126,201	31.43%	Yes	Init	Department of Industry and Public Works Amendment
28	No	25,058	153,638	14.02%	No	Init	Primary Delegate Election Bill
29	No	43,280	140,507	23.55%	Yes	Init	Equal Assessment and Taxation and $300 Exemption Amendment

=== 1916 ===
1916 General Election
meas. num	passed	Yes votes	No votes	% Yes	Const. Amd.?	Type	description
1	Yes	141,773	53,207	72.71%	Yes	Leg	Single Item Veto Amendment
2	Yes	119,652	65,410	64.66%	Yes	Leg	Ship Tax Exemption Amendment
3	No	100,027	100,701	49.83%	Yes	Leg	Negro and Mulatto Suffrage Amendment
4	No	43,390	154,980	21.87%	Yes	Init	Full Rental Value Land Tax and Homemakers' Loan Fund Amendment
5	No	96,829	109,523	46.92%	Yes	Init	For Pendleton Normal School and Ratifying Location Certain State Institutions
6	No	99,745	100,119	49.91%	No	Init	Anti-compulsory Vaccination Bill
7	Yes	125,836	93,076	57.48%	No	Init	Bill Repealing and Abolishing the Sunday Closing Law
8	No	85,973	140,599	37.95%	Yes	Init	Permitting Manufacture and Regulating Sale 4 Percent Malt Liquors
9	Yes	114,932	109,671	51.17%	Yes	Init	Prohibition Amendment Forbidding Importation of Intoxicating Liquors for Beverage Purposes
10	Yes	107,488	83,887	56.17%	Yes	Init	Rural Credits Amendment
11	Yes	99,536	84,031	54.22%	Yes	Init	Statewide Tax and Indebtedness Limitation Amendment

=== 1917 ===
June 1917 Special Election
meas. num	passed	Yes votes	No votes	% Yes	Const. Amd.?	Type	description
1	Yes	67,445	54,864	55.14%	Yes	Leg	Authorizing Ports to Create Limited Indebtedness to Encourage Water Transportation
2	No	22,276	103,238	17.75%	Yes	Leg	Limiting Number of Bills Introduced and Increasing Pay of Legislators
3	No	37,187	72,445	33.92%	Yes	Leg	Declaration Against Implied Repeal of Constitutional Provisions by Amendments Thereto
4	Yes	62,118	53,245	53.85%	Yes	Leg	Uniform Tax Classification Amendment
5	Yes	83,630	42,296	66.41%	Yes	Leg	Requiring Election City, Town and State Officers at Same Time
6	No	46,666	86,165	35.13%	No	Leg	Four Hundred Thousand Dollar Tax Levy for a New Penitentiary
7	Yes	77,316	63,803	54.79%	No	Leg	Six Million Dollar State Road Bond Issue and Highway Bill

=== 1918 ===
1918 General Election
meas. num	passed	Yes votes	No votes	% Yes	Const. Amd.?	Type	description
1	No	49,935	66,070	43.05%	Yes	Leg	Establishing and Maintaining Southern and Eastern Oregon Normal Schools
2	No	43,441	65,299	39.95%	No	Leg	Establishing Dependent, Delinquent and Defective Children's Home, Appropriating Money Therefor
3	No	45,511	50,227	47.54%	No	Ref	Prohibiting Seine and Setnet Fishing in Rogue River and Tributaries
4	Yes	55,555	40,908	57.59%	No	Ref	Closing the Willamette River to Commercial Fishing South of Oswego
5	Yes	66,652	41,594	61.57%	No	Init	Delinquent Tax Notice Bill
6	Yes	50,073	41,816	54.49%	No	Init	Fixing Compensation for Publication of Legal Notice
7	No	41,364	56,974	42.06%	No	-	Authorizing Increase in Amount of Levy of State Taxes for Year 1919 (submitted by state tax commission under chapter 150, Laws 1917)

=== 1919 ===
June 1919 Special Election
meas. num	passed	Yes votes	No votes	% Yes	Const. Amd.?	Type	description
1	Yes	49,728	33,561	59.71%	Yes	Leg	Six Percent County Indebtedness for Permanent Roads Amendment
2	No	38,204	40,707	48.41%	Yes	Leg	Industrial and Reconstruction Hospital Amendment
3	Yes	43,010	35,948	54.47%	Yes	Leg	State Bond Payment of Irrigation and Drainage District Bond Interest
4	No	39,130	40,580	49.09%	Yes	Leg	Five Million Dollar Reconstruction Bonding Amendment
5	No	32,653	46,861	41.07%	Yes	Leg	Lieutenant Governor Constitutional Amendment
6	Yes	56,966	29,159	66.14%	No	Leg	The Roosevelt Coast Military Highway Bill
7	No	37,294	42,792	46.57%	No	Leg	Reconstruction Bonding Bill
8	Yes	49,158	33,513	59.46%	No	Leg	Soldiers', Sailors' and Marines' Educational Financial Aid Bill
9	Yes	53,191	28,039	65.48%	No	Leg	Market Roads Tax Bill

== 1920s ==
May 1920 Special Election
meas. num	passed	Yes votes	No votes	% Yes	Const. Amd.?	Type	description
1	Yes	100,256	35,655	73.77%	Yes	Leg	Extending Eminent Domain Over Roads and Ways
2	Yes	93,392	46,084	66.96%	Yes	Leg	Limitation of 4 Percent State Indebtedness for Permanent Roads
3	Yes	81,756	64,589	55.87%	Yes	Leg	Restoring Capital Punishment
4	Yes	72,378	36,699	66.35%	Yes	Leg	Crook and Curry Counties Bonding Amendment
5	Yes	78,241	56,946	57.88%	Yes	Leg	Successor to Governor
6	Yes	102,722	46,577	68.80%	No	Leg	Higher Educational Tax Act
7	Yes	91,294	50,482	64.39%	No	Leg	Soldiers', Sailors' and Marines' Educational Aid Revenue Bill
8	Yes	110,263	39,593	73.58%	No	Leg	State Elementary School Fund Tax
9	Yes	115,337	30,739	78.96%	No	Leg	Blind School Tax Measure

1920 General Election
meas. num	passed	Yes votes	No votes	% Yes	Const. Amd.?	Type	description
1	No	61,258	131,603	31.76%	Yes	Leg	Compulsory Voting and Registration Amendment
2	No	80,342	85,524	48.44%	Yes	Leg	Constitutional Amendment Regulating Legislative Sessions and the Payment of Legislators
3	No	67,101	119,126	36.03%	No	Ref	Oleomargarine Bills
4	No	37,283	147,426	20.18%	Yes	Init	Single Tax Constitutional Amendment
5	Yes	97,854	80,983	54.72%	Yes	Init	Fixing Term of Certain County Officers
6	No	80,493	84,830	48.69%	No	Init	Port of Portland Dock Commission Consolidation
7	No	63,018	127,570	33.07%	Yes	Init	Anti-compulsory Vaccination Amendment
8	No	28,976	158,673	15.44%	Yes	Init	Constitutional Amendment Fixing Legal Rate of Interest in Oregon
9	No	78,961	107,383	42.37%	No	Init	Roosevelt Bird Refuge
10	No	57,791	101,179	36.35%	Yes	Init	Divided Legislative Session Constitutional Amendment
11	No	51,605	119,464	30.17%	No	Init	State Market Commission Act

=== 1921 ===
June 1921 Special Election
meas. num	passed	Yes votes	No votes	% Yes	Const. Amd.?	Type	description
1	No	42,924	72,596	37.16%	Yes	Leg	Legislative Regulation and Compensation Amendment
2	Yes	88,219	37,866	69.97%	Yes	Leg	World War Veterans' State Aid Fund, Constitutional Amendment
3	Yes	62,621	45,537	57.90%	Yes	Leg	Emergency Clause Veto Constitutional Amendment
4	No	56,858	65,793	46.36%	No	Leg	Hygiene Marriage Examination and License Bill
5	Yes	59,882	59,265	50.26%	No	Leg	Women Jurors and Revised Jury Law

=== 1922 ===
1922 General Election
meas. num	passed	Yes votes	No votes	% Yes	Const. Amd.?	Type	description
1	Yes	89,177	57,049	60.99%	Yes	Leg	Amendment Permitting Linn County Tax Levy to Pay Outstanding Warrants
2	Yes	86,547	53,844	61.65%	Yes	Leg	Amendment Permitting Linn and Benton Counties to Pay Outstanding Warrants
3	No	39,231	132,021	22.91%	Yes	Init	Single Tax Amendment
4	No	82,837	95,587	46.43%	No	Init	1925 Exposition Tax Amendment
5	No	54,803	112,197	32.82%	No	Init	Income Tax Amendment
6	Yes	115,506	103,685	52.70%	No	Init	Compulsory Education Bill amended a statute requiring children between eight and sixteen to attend public school, to eliminate an exemption for private school students; the measure passed, but was invalidated by the Supreme Court of the United States in Pierce v. Society of Sisters (1925).

=== 1923 ===
November 1923 Special Election
meas. num	passed	Yes votes	No votes	% Yes	Const. Amd.?	Type	description
1	Yes	58,647	58,131	50.22%	No	Leg	Income Tax Act

=== 1924 ===
1924 General Election
meas. num	passed	Yes votes	No votes	% Yes	Const. Amd.?	Type	description
1	Yes	184,031	48,645	79.09%	Yes	Leg	Voters' Literacy Amendment
2	Yes	134,071	65,133	67.30%	Yes	Leg	Public Use and Welfare Amendment
3	Yes	131,199	92,446	58.66%	Yes	Leg	Bonus Amendment
4	No	91,597	157,324	36.80%	No	Ref	Oleomargarine Condensed Milk Bill
5	No	75,159	122,839	37.96%	No	Init	Naturopath Bill
6	No	73,270	151,862	32.55%	Yes	Init	Workmen's Compulsory Compensation Law for Hazardous Occupations
7	Yes	123,799	111,055	52.71%	No	Init	Income Tax Repeal

=== 1926 ===
1926 General Election
meas. num	passed	Yes votes	No votes	% Yes	Const. Amd.?	type	description
1	Yes	81,954	68,128	54.61%	Yes	Leg	Klamath County Bonding Amendment
2	No	54,624	99,125	35.53%	Yes	Leg	Six Percent Limitation Amendment
3	Yes	108,332	64,954	62.52%	Yes	Leg	Repeal of Free Negro and Mulatto Section of the Constitution
4	No	59,442	121,973	32.77%	Yes	Leg	Amendment Prohibiting Inheritance and Income Taxes
5	No	47,878	124,811	27.72%	No	Leg	The Seaside Normal School Act
6	Yes	101,327	80,084	55.85%	No	Leg	The Eastern Oregon State Normal School Act
7	Yes	100,324	61,307	62.07%	Yes	Leg	The Recall Amendment
8	Yes	78,823	61,472	56.18%	Yes	Leg	Curry County Bonding or Tax Levy Amendment
9	Yes	100,397	54,474	64.83%	Yes	Leg	Amendment Relating to Elections to Fill Vacancies in Public Offices
10	Yes	75,229	61,718	54.93%	Yes	Leg	Klamath and Clackamas County Bonding Amendment
11	Yes	131,296	48,490	73.03%	No	Leg	The Eastern Oregon Tuberculosis Hospital Act
12	No	62,254	123,208	33.57%	No	Ref	Cigarette and Tobacco Tax Bill
13	Yes	99,746	78,685	55.90%	No	Ref	Motor Bus and Truck Bill
14	No	46,389	97,460	32.25%	No	Ref	Act Appropriating Ten Percent of Self-sustaining Boards' Receipts
15	No	50,199	122,512	29.07%	No	Init	Income Tax Bill With Property Tax Offset
16	No	76,164	94,533	44.62%	No	Init	Bus and Truck Operating License Bill
17	Yes	102,119	73,086	58.29%	No	Init	Fishwheel, Trap, Seine and Gillnet Bill
18	No	83,991	93,997	47.19%	No	Init	Income Tax Bill
19	No	35,313	147,092	19.36%	Yes	Init	Oregon Water and Power Board Development Measure
20	No	1,988	2,646	42.90%	No	Leg	Amendment Fixing Salaries of County Officers of Umatilla County
21	No	2,826	6,199	31.31%	No	Leg	To Provide Salaries for Certain Officials of Clackamas County

=== 1927 ===
June 1927 Special Election
meas. num	passed	Yes votes	No votes	% Yes	Const. Amd.?	type	description
1	Yes	69,373	41,887	62.35%	Yes	Leg	Repeal of Negro, Chinaman and Mulatto Suffrage Section of Constitution
2	No	46,784	55,817	45.60%	Yes	Leg	Portland School District Tax Levy Amendment
3	Yes	64,956	38,774	62.62%	Yes	Leg	Criminal Information Amendment
4	No	28,380	81,215	25.90%	Yes	Leg	Legislators' Pay Amendment
5	Yes	55,802	49,682	52.90%	Yes	Leg	Voters' Registration Amendment
6	No	46,999	61,838	43.18%	Yes	Leg	State and County Officers, Salary Amendment
7	No	41,309	57,613	41.76%	Yes	Leg	City and County Consolidation Amendment
8	No	25,180	80,476	23.83%	Yes	Leg	Veterans' Memorial and Armory Amendment
9	No	19,393	84,697	18.63%	Yes	Leg	State Tax Limitation Amendment
10	No	48,745	67,039	42.10%	No	Leg	Income Tax Bill
11	No	31,957	70,871	31.08%	No	Leg	Property Assessment and Taxation Enforcement Bill
12	Yes	53,684	47,552	53.03%	No	Ref	Nestucca Bay Fish Closing Bill

=== 1928 ===
1928 General Election
meas. num	passed	Yes votes	No votes	% Yes	Const. Amd.?	type	description
1	No	71,824	198,798	26.54%	Yes	Init	Five Cent Gasoline Tax Bill
2	No	98,248	174,219	36.06%	Yes	Init	Bill for Reduction of Motor Vehicle License Fees
3	No	118,696	132,961	47.17%	No	Init	Income Tax Bill
4	No	108,230	124,200	46.56%	Yes	Init	Limiting Power of Legislature Over Laws Approved by the People
5	No	78,317	157,398	33.23%	No	Init	Deschutes River Water and Fish Bill
6	No	79,028	156,009	33.62%	No	Init	Rogue River Water and Fish Bill
7	No	76,108	154,345	33.03%	No	Init	Umpqua River Water and Fish Bill
8	No	77,974	153,418	33.70%	No	Init	McKenzie River Water and Fish Bill

== 1930s ==
1930 General Election
meas. num	passed	Yes votes	No votes	% Yes	Const. Amd.?	type	description
1	Yes	96,061	74,892	56.19%	Yes	Leg	Repeal of State Payment of Irrigation and Drainage District Interest
2	No	51,248	135,412	27.46%	Yes	Leg	State Cabinet Form of Government Constitutional Amendment
3	No	92,602	101,785	47.64%	Yes	Leg	Bonus Loan Constitutional Amendment
4	No	71,557	115,480	38.26%	Yes	Leg	Motor Vehicle License Tax Constitutional Amendment
5	No	63,683	111,441	36.36%	Yes	Leg	Motor Vehicle License Tax Constitutional Amendment
6	Yes	85,836	76,455	52.89%	Yes	Leg	Constitutional Amendment for Filling Vacancies in the Legislature
7	No	70,937	108,070	39.63%	Yes	Leg	Legislators' Compensation Constitutional Amendment
8	No	39,770	137,549	22.43%	No	Ref	Two Additional Circuit Judges Bill
9	Yes	105,189	95,207	52.49%	No	Ref	Income Tax Bill
10	No	54,231	156,265	25.76%	Yes	Init	Anti-cigarette Constitutional Amendment
11	No	96,596	99,490	49.26%	Yes	Init	Rogue River Fishing Constitutional Amendment
12	No	92,707	95,277	49.32%	Yes	Init	Lieutenant Governor Constitutional Amendment
13	Yes	117,776	84,778	58.15%	Yes	Init	People's Water and Power Utility Districts Constitutional Amendment

=== 1932 ===
1932 General Election
meas. num	passed	Yes votes	No votes	% Yes	Const. Amd.?	type	description
1	Yes	189,321	124,160	60.39%	Yes	Leg	Taxpayer Voting Qualification Amendment
2	Yes	191,042	111,872	63.07%	Yes	Leg	Amendment Authorizing Criminal Trials Without Juries by Consent of Accused
3	Yes	149,833	121,852	55.15%	Yes	Leg	Six Percent Tax Limitation Amendment
4	No	131,273	200,496	39.57%	No	Ref	Oleomargarine Tax Bill
5	No	127,445	180,527	41.38%	No	Ref	Bill Prohibiting Commercial Fishing on the Rogue River
6	No	58,076	237,218	19.67%	No	Ref	Higher Education Appropriation Bill
7	Yes	206,619	138,775	59.82%	No	Init	Bill to Repeal State Prohibition Law of Oregon
8	No	151,790	180,609	45.66%	No	Init	The Freight Truck and Bus Bill
9	No	47,275	292,486	13.91%	No	Init	Bill Moving University, Normal and Law Schools, Establishing Junior Colleges
10	No	99,171	162,552	37.89%	Yes	Init	Tax and Debt Control Constitutional Amendment
11	No	117,940	154,206	43.34%	No	Init	Tax Supervising and Conservation Bill
12	No	144,502	162,468	47.07%	No	Init	Personal Income Tax Law Amendment
13	Yes	168,937	130,494	56.42%	Yes	Init	State Water Power and Hydroelectric Constitutional Amendment

=== 1933 ===
July 1933 Special Election
meas. num	passed	Yes votes	No votes	% Yes	Const. Amd.?	type	description
1	Yes	136,713	72,854	65.24%	No	Leg	An Amendment to the Constitution of the United States of America
2	Yes	113,267	75,476	60.01%	Yes	Leg	Soldiers and Sailors Bonus Limitation Amendment
3	No	66,425	117,148	36.18%	Yes	Leg	County Manager Form of Government Constitutional Amendment
4	No	67,192	110,755	37.76%	Yes	Leg	Prosecution by Information and Grand Jury Modification Amendment
5	No	82,996	91,671	47.52%	Yes	Leg	Debt and Taxation Limitations for Municipal Corporations Constitutional Amendment
6	No	73,756	106,153	41.00%	No	Leg	State Power Fund Bonds
7	No	45,603	167,512	21.40%	No	Leg	Sales Tax Bill
8	Yes	143,044	72,745	66.29%	Yes	Leg	Repeal of Oregon Prohibition Constitutional Amendment
9	No	66,880	144,542	31.63%	No	Ref	Oleomargarine Tax Bill

=== 1934 ===
May 1934 Special Election
meas. num	passed	Yes votes	No votes	% Yes	Const. Amd.?	type	description
1	No	83,424	96,629	46.33%	Yes	Leg	County Indebtedness and Funding Bond Constitutional Amendment
2	Yes	117,446	83,430	58.47%	Yes	Leg	Criminal Trial Without Jury and Non-unanimous Verdict Constitutional Amendment
3	Yes	104,459	98,815	51.39%	No	Leg	Bill Authorizing a State Tuberculosis Hospital in Multnomah County
4	No	92,575	108,816	45.97%	No	Leg	Bill Authorizing a State Insane Hospital in Multnomah County
5	No	64,677	156,182	29.28%	No	Ref	School Relief Sales Tax Bill

=== 1934 ===
1934 General Election
meas. num	passed	Yes votes	No votes	% Yes	Const. Amd.?	type	description
1	No	124,518	139,283	47.20%	No	Ref	Grange Power Bill
2	No	100,565	161,644	38.35%	Yes	Init	Limitations of Taxes on Taxable Property Constitutional Amendment
3	No	70,626	191,836	26.91%	Yes	Init	Healing Arts Constitutional Amendment

=== 1936 ===
January 1936 Special Election
meas. num	passed	Yes votes	No votes	% Yes	Const. Amd.?	type	description
1	No	61,270	155,922	28.21%	No	Leg	Bill Changing Primary Elections to September With Other Resulting Changes
2	No	28,661	184,332	13.46%	Yes	Leg	Compensation of Members of the Legislature Constitutional Amendment
3	No	32,106	187,319	14.63%	No	Leg	Sales Tax Bill
4	No	50,971	163,191	23.80%	No	Ref	Bill Authorizing Student Activity Fees in State Higher Educational Institutions

1936 General Election
meas. num	passed	Yes votes	No votes	% Yes	Const. Amd.?	type	description
1	No	174,293	179,236	49.30%	No	Ref	Bill Amending Old Age Assistance Act of 1935
2	No	100,141	222,897	31.00%	Yes	Init	Amendment Forbidding Prevention or Regulation of Certain Advertising If Truthful
3	No	112,546	203,693	35.59%	Yes	Init	Tax Limitation Constitutional Amendment for School Districts Having 100,000 Population
4	No	131,917	214,246	38.11%	No	Init	Noncompulsory Military Training Bill
5	No	79,604	241,042	24.83%	Yes	Init	Amendment Limiting and Reducing Permissible Taxes on Tangible Property
6	No	131,489	208,179	38.71%	No	Init	State Power Bill
7	No	100,356	208,741	32.47%	Yes	Init	State Hydroelectric Temporary Administrative Board Constitutional Amendment
8	No	82,869	250,777	24.84%	No	Init	State Bank Bill

=== 1938 ===
1938 General Election
meas. num	passed	Yes votes	No votes	% Yes	Const. Amd.?	type	description
1	Yes	233,384	93,752	71.34%	Yes	Leg	Governor's 20-day Bill Consideration Amendment
2	No	133,525	165,797	44.61%	Yes	Leg	Amendment Repealing the Double Liability of Stockholders in Banking Corporations
3	No	149,356	169,131	46.90%	Yes	Leg	Legislators Compensation Constitutional Amendments
4	Yes	277,099	66,484	80.65%	No	Leg	Bill Requiring Marriage License Applicants Medically Examined; Physically and Mentally
5	Yes	204,561	126,580	61.77%	No	Ref	Slot Machines Seizure by Sheriffs and Destruction on Court Order
6	Yes	197,912	129,043	60.53%	No	Ref	Prohibiting Slot Machines, Pin-ball, Dart and Other Similar Games
7	Yes	183,781	149,711	55.11%	No	Init	Townsend Plan Bill
8	No	112,172	219,557	33.81%	No	Init	Citizens' Retirement Annuity Bill; Levying Transactions Tax to Provide Fund
9	Yes	197,771	148,460	57.12%	No	Init	Bill Regulating Picketing and Boycotting by Labor Groups and Organizations
10	Yes	247,685	75,295	76.69%	No	Init	Water Purification and Prevention of Pollution Bill
11	No	118,282	222,221	34.74%	No	Init	Bill Regulating Sale of Alcoholic Liquor for Beverage Purposes
12	No	141,792	180,329	44.02%	Yes	Init	Constitutional Amendment Legalizing Certain Lotteries and Other Forms of Gambling

== 1940s ==
1940 General Election
meas. num	passed	Yes votes	No votes	% Yes	Const. Amd.?	type	description
1	No	163,942	213,797	43.40%	Yes	Leg	Amendment Removing Office Time Limit of State Secretary and Treasurer
2	No	129,699	183,488	41.41%	Yes	Leg	Amendment Making Three Years' Average People's Voted Levies, Tax Base
3	No	157,891	191,290	45.22%	Yes	Leg	Amendment Repealing the Double Liability of Stockholders of State Banks
4	No	186,830	188,031	49.84%	Yes	Leg	Legislators' Compensation Constitutional Amendment
5	No	156,421	221,203	41.42%	No	Ref	Bill Changing the Primary Nominating Elections from May to September
6	No	158,004	235,128	40.19%	No	Ref	Bill to Further Regulate Sale and Use of Alcoholic Liquor
7	No	90,681	309,183	22.68%	No	Init	Bill Repealing Present Liquor Law; Authorizing Private Sale, Licensed, Taxed
8	No	150,157	258,010	36.79%	Yes	Init	Amendment Legalizing Certain Gambling and Gaming Devices and Certain Lotteries
9	No	201,983	213,838	48.57%	No	Init	Bill to Repeal the Oregon Milk Control Law

=== 1942 ===
1942 General Election
meas. num	passed	Yes votes	No votes	% Yes	Const. Amd.?	type	description
1	Yes	129,318	109,898	54.06%	Yes	Leg	Legislators' Compensation Constitutional Amendment
2	Yes	101,425	88,857	53.30%	Yes	Leg	Rural Credits Loan Fund Repeal Amendment
3	Yes	125,990	86,332	59.34%	Yes	Leg	Amendment Specifying Exclusive Uses of Gasoline and Motor Vehicle Taxes
4	No	101,508	103,404	49.54%	Yes	Leg	Amendment Authorizing Regulation by Law of Voting Privilege Forfeiture
5	No	110,643	127,366	46.49%	No	Ref	Cigarette Tax Bill
6	No	97,212	137,177	41.47%	No	Ref	Bill Restricting and Prohibiting Net Fishing Coastal Streams and Bays
7	Yes	136,321	92,623	59.54%	No	Init	Bill Distributing Surplus Funds to School Districts, Reducing Taxes Therein

=== 1944 ===
1944 General Election
meas. num	passed	Yes votes	No votes	% Yes	Const. Amd.?	type	description
1	Yes	228,744	115,745	66.40%	Yes	Leg	Amendment To Provide Alternative Means for Securing Bank Deposits
2	Yes	175,716	154,504	53.21%	Yes	Leg	Amendment Authorizing Change to Managerial Form of County Government
3	Yes	190,520	178,581	51.62%	Yes	Leg	Amendment Authorizing "Oregon War Veterans' Fund," Providing Tax Therefor
4	Yes	183,855	156,219	54.06%	Yes	Leg	Amendment to Authorize Legislative Regulation of Voting Privilege Forfeiture
5	Yes	238,350	135,317	63.79%	No	Leg	Bill Providing Educational Aid to Certain Veterans World War II
6	No	96,697	269,276	26.42%	No	Leg	Bill Imposing Tax on Retail Sales of Tangible Personal Property
7	Yes	228,853	180,158	55.95%	No	Ref	Burke Bill; Only State Selling Liquor over 14 Hundredths Alcohol
8	No	177,153	186,976	48.65%	Yes	Init	Constitutional Amendment Increasing State Tax Fund for Public School Support
9	No	180,691	219,981	45.10%	Yes	Init	Constitutional Amendment Providing Monthly Annuities From a Gross Income Tax

=== 1945 ===
June 1945 Special Election
meas. num	passed	Yes votes	No votes	% Yes	Const. Amd.?	type	description
1	Yes	78,269	49,565	61.23%	No	Leg	Bill Authorizing Tax Levy for State Building Fund
2	No	60,321	67,542	47.18%	No	Leg	Bill Authorizing Cigarette Tax to Support Public Schools

=== 1946 ===
1946 General Election
meas. num	passed	Yes votes	No votes	% Yes	Const. Amd.?	type	description
1	Yes	221,547	70,322	75.91%	Yes	Leg	Constitutional Amendment Providing for Succession to Office of Governor
2	No	75,693	219,006	25.68%	No	Leg	Bill Authorizing Tax for Construction and Equipment of State Armories
3	Yes	155,733	134,673	53.63%	No	Leg	Bill Establishing Rural School Districts and School Boards
4	Yes	161,865	133,111	54.87%	Yes	Leg	Bill Authorizing Chinamen to Hold Real Estate and Mining Claims
5	Yes	145,248	113,279	56.18%	Yes	Leg	Amendment Permitting Legislative Bills to be Read by Title Only
6	No	88,717	185,247	32.38%	Yes	Leg	Constitutional Amendment Increasing Number of Senators to Thirty-one
7	Yes	196,195	101,398	65.93%	No	Ref	Bill Regulating Fishing in Coastal Streams and Inland Waters
8	No	86,374	244,960	26.07%	No	Init	To Create State Old-age and Disability Pension Fund
9	Yes	157,904	151,765	50.99%	No	Init	To Create Basic School Support Fund by Annual Tax Levy

=== 1947 ===
October 1947 Special Election
meas. num	passed	Yes votes	No votes	% Yes	Const. Amd.?	type	description
1	No	67,514	180,333	27.24%	No	Leg	Bill Taxing Retail Sales for School, Welfare and Governmental Purposes
2	No	103,794	140,876	42.42%	No	Ref	Cigarette Tax Bill

=== 1948 ===
1948 General Election
meas. num.	passed	Yes votes	No votes	% Yes	Const. Amd.?	type	description
1	No	150,032	268,155	35.88%	Yes	Leg	Constitutional Six Percent Tax Limitation Amendment
2	Yes	211,912	209,317	50.31%	Yes	Leg	Constitutional Amendment Authorizing Indebtedness for State Forestation
3	Yes	227,638	219,196	50.94%	No	Leg	Bill Authorizing State Boys' Camp Near Timber, Oregon
4	No	173,004	242,100	41.68%	No	Ref	Bill Amending Licensing and Acquisition Provisions for Hydroelectric Commission Act
5	Yes	284,776	164,025	63.45%	Yes	Init	Constitutional Amendment Fixing Qualifications of Voters in School Elections
6	Yes	313,212	172,531	64.48%	No	Init	Oregon Old Age Pension Act
7	Yes	405,842	63,373	86.49%	No	Init	Bill Increasing Personal Income Tax Exemptions
8	No	210,108	273,621	43.44%	No	Init	Oregon Liquor Dispensing Licensing Act
9	No	198,283	265,805	42.73%	Yes	Init	World War II Veterans' Bonus Amendment
10	Yes	273,140	184,834	59.64%	No	Init	Prohibiting Salmon Fishing in Columbia River With Fixed Appliances
11	No	143,856	256,167	35.96%	No	Ref	Question of Authorizing Additional State Tax, to be Offset by Income Tax Funds

== 1950s ==
1950 General Election
meas. num.	passed	Yes votes	No votes	% Yes	Const. Amd.?	type	description
1	Yes	243,518	205,361	54.25%	Yes	Leg	Constitutional Amendment Fixing Legislators' Annual Compensation
2	No	256,895	192,573	57.16%	Yes	Leg	Constitutional Amendment Lending State Tax Credit for Higher Education Buildings
3	Yes	268,171	183,724	59.34%	Yes	Leg	Constitutional Amendment Augmenting "Oregon War Veterans' Fund"
4	No	234,394	231,856	50.27%	Yes	Leg	Increasing Basic School Support Fund by Annual Tax Levy
5	Yes	310,143	158,939	66.12%	No	Ref	Needy Aged Persons Public Assistance Act
6	Yes	277,633	195,319	58.70%	No	Ref	Providing Uniform Standard Time in Oregon
7	Yes	239,553	216,958	52.47%	Yes	Init	World War II Veterans' Compensation Fund
8	No	190,992	215,302	47.01%	Yes	Init	Constitutional Amendment for Legislative Representation Reapportionment
9	No	113,524	378,732	23.06%	No	Init	Making Sale of Promotively Advertised Alcoholic Beverage Unlawful

=== 1952 ===
1952 General Election
meas. num.	passed	Yes votes	No votes	% Yes	Const. Amd.?	type	description
1	No	282,882	326,199	46.44%	Yes	Leg	Amendment Making Superintendent of Public Instruction Appointive
2	Yes	454,898	147,128	75.56%	Yes	Leg	World War Veterans' State Aid Sinking Fund Repeal
3	Yes	480,479	153,402	75.80%	No	Leg	Act Authorizing Domiciliary State Hospital for Aged Mentally Ill
4	Yes	355,136	210,373	62.80%	Yes	Leg	Amendment Legal Voters of Taxing Unit Establish Tax Base
5	Yes	465,605	132,363	77.86%	Yes	Leg	Amendment to Augment Oregon War Veterans' Fund
6	Yes	364,539	194,492	65.21%	Yes	Leg	Amendment Creating Legislative Assembly Emergency Committee
7	Yes	483,356	103,357	82.38%	Yes	Leg	Amendment Fixing Elective Terms of State Senators and Representatives
8	Yes	315,071	191,087	62.25%	Yes	Leg	Amendatory Act Title Subject Amendment
9	Yes	318,948	272,145	53.96%	No	Leg	Act Limiting State Property Tax
10	Yes	409,588	230,241	64.02%	No	Ref	Motor Carrier Highway Transportation Tax Act
11	No	295,700	301,974	49.48%	No	Ref	School District Reorganization Act
12	No	233,226	413,137	36.08%	No	Ref	Cigarette Stamp Tax Revenue Act
13	Yes	399,981	256,981	60.88%	No	Init	Establishing United States Standard Time in Oregon
14	No	230,097	411,884	35.84%	Yes	Init	Constitutional Amendment Prohibiting Lotteries, Bookmaking, Pari-mutuel Betting on Animal Racing
15	Yes	369,127	285,446	56.39%	Yes	Init	Constitutional Amendment Authorizing Alcoholic Liquor Sale by Individual Glass
16	No	135,468	484,730	21.84%	Yes	Init	Constitutional Amendment Providing Equitable Taxing Method for Use of Highways
17	No	313,629	337,750	48.15%	No	Init	Milk Production and Marketing Act Bill
18	Yes	357,550	194,292	64.79%	Yes	Init	Constitutional Legislative Senator and Representative Apportionment Enforcement Amendment

=== 1954 ===
1954 General Election
meas. num.	passed	Yes votes	No votes	% Yes	Const. Amd.?	type	description
1	No	216,545	296,008	42.25%	Yes	Leg	Salaries of State Legislators
2	Yes	268,337	208,077	56.32%	Yes	Leg	Subdividing Counties for Electing State Legislators
3	Yes	397,625	128,685	75.55%	No	Leg	Mental Hospital In or Near Portland
4	Yes	251,078	230,770	52.11%	Yes	Leg	Constitutional Amendments—How Proposed by People
5	No	208,419	264,569	44.06%	Yes	Leg	State Property Tax
6	No	252,305	300,007	45.68%	No	Init	Establishing Daylight Saving Time
7	No	232,775	278,805	45.50%	No	Init	Prohibiting Certain Fishing in Coastal Streams
8	Yes	293,745	247,591	54.26%	No	Init	Repealing Milk Control Law

=== 1956 ===
1956 General Election
meas. num.	passed	Yes votes	No votes	% Yes	Const. Amd.?	type	description
1	No	175,932	487,550	26.52%	Yes	Leg	State Tax Laws—Immediate Effect Authorized
2	Yes	498,633	153,033	76.52%	Yes	Leg	Authorizing State Acceptance of Certain Gifts
3	Yes	390,338	263,155	59.73%	Yes	Leg	Salaries of Certain State Officers
4	Yes	455,485	182,550	71.39%	Yes	Leg	Qualifications for County Coroner and Surveyor-
5	No	320,741	338,365	48.66%	Yes	Leg	Salaries of State Legislators
6	No	280,055	414,613	40.31%	No	Ref	Cigarette Tax
7	Yes	401,882	259,309	60.78%	No	Init	Prohibiting Certain Fishing in Coastal Streams

=== 1958 ===
1958 General Election
meas. num.	passed	Yes votes	No votes	% Yes	Const. Amd.?	type	description
1	Yes	399,396	114,318	77.75%	Yes	Leg	Fixing State Boundaries
2	No	232,246	318,685	42.16%	Yes	Leg	Increasing Funds for War Veterans' Loans
3	No	236,000	316,437	42.72%	Yes	Leg	Salaries of State Legislators
4	No	264,434	276,487	48.89%	Yes	Leg	Capital Punishment Bill
5	No	221,330	268,716	45.17%	Yes	Leg	Financing Urban Redevelopment Projects
6	Yes	252,347	224,426	52.93%	Yes	Leg	Modifying County Debt Limitation
7	Yes	357,792	136,745	72.35%	Yes	Leg	Special Grand Jury Bill
8	Yes	303,282	193,177	61.09%	Yes	Leg	Authorizes Different Use of State Institution
9	Yes	373,466	125,898	74.79%	Yes	Leg	Temporary Appointment and Assignment of Judges
10	No	218,662	291,210	42.89%	Yes	Leg	State Power Development
11	Yes	311,516	157,023	66.49%	Yes	Leg	County Home Rule Amendment
12	Yes	319,790	195,945	62.01%	Yes	Leg	Authorizing Discontinuing Certain State Tuberculosis Hospitals
13	Yes	320,751	201,700	61.39%	Yes	Init	Persons Eligible to Serve in Legislature

== 1960s ==
May 1960 Special Election
meas. num.	passed	Yes votes	No votes	% Yes	Const. Amd.?	type	description
1	No	250,456	281,542	47.08%	Yes	Leg	Salaries of State Legislators

1960 General Election
meas. num.	passed	Yes votes	No votes	% Yes	Const. Amd.?	type	description
1	Yes	579,022	92,187	86.27%	Yes	Leg	Fixing Commencement of Legislators' Term
2	No	357,499	393,652	47.59%	No	Leg	Daylight Saving Time
3	Yes	335,792	312,187	51.82%	Yes	Leg	Financing Urban Redevelopment Projects
4	No	306,190	340,197	47.37%	Yes	Leg	Permitting Prosecution by Information or Indictment
5	Yes	358,367	289,895	55.28%	Yes	Leg	Authorizing Legislature to Propose Revised Constitution
6	Yes	467,557	233,759	66.67%	Yes	Leg	State Bonds for Higher Education Facilities
7	Yes	508,108	183,977	73.42%	Yes	Leg	Voter Qualification Amendment
8	No	232,250	433,515	34.88%	Yes	Leg	Authorizing Bonds for State Building Program
9	Yes	578,471	123,283	82.43%	Yes	Leg	Compulsory Retirement for Judges
10	Yes	486,019	169,865	74.10%	Yes	Leg	Elective Offices: When to Become Vacant
11	Yes	399,210	222,736	64.19%	Yes	Leg	Financing Improvements in Home Rule Counties
12	Yes	578,266	88,995	86.66%	Yes	Leg	Continuity of Government in Enemy Attack
13	Yes	415,931	266,630	60.94%	Yes	Leg	War Veterans' Bonding and Loan Amendment
14	No	115,610	570,025	16.86%	No	Ref	Personal Income Tax Bill
15	No	261,735	475,290	35.51%	No	Init	Billboard Control Measure

=== 1962 ===
May 1962 Special Election
meas. num.	passed	Yes votes	No votes	% Yes	Const. Amd.?	type	description
1	No	141,728	262,140	35.09%	Yes	Leg	Six Percent Limitation Amendment
2	Yes	241,171	178,749	57.43%	Yes	Leg	Salaries of State Legislators

1962 General Election
meas. num.	passed	Yes votes	No votes	% Yes	Const. Amd.?	type	description
1	Yes	312,680	234,440	57.15%	Yes	Leg	Reorganize State Militia
2	Yes	323,799	199,174	61.92%	Yes	Leg	Forest Rehabilitation Debt Limit Amendment
3	Yes	319,956	200,236	61.51%	Yes	Leg	Permanent Road Debt Limit Amendment
4	Yes	298,255	208,755	58.83%	Yes	Leg	Power Development Debt Limit Amendment
5	Yes	307,855	193,487	61.41%	Yes	Leg	State Courts Creation and Jurisdiction
6	Yes	388,154	229,661	62.83%	No	Leg	Daylight Saving Time
7	Yes	270,637	219,509	55.22%	Yes	Leg	Constitutional Six Percent Limitation Amendment
8	No	206,540	320,917	39.16%	No	Init	Repeals School District Reorganization Law
9	No	197,322	325,182	37.76%	Yes	Init	Legislative Apportionment Constitutional Amendment

=== 1963 ===
October 1963 Special Election
meas. num.	passed	Yes votes	No votes	% Yes	Const. Amd.?	type	description
1	No	103,737	362,845	22.23%	No	Ref	Personal and Corporation Income Tax Bill

=== 1964 ===
May 1964 Election
meas. num.	passed	Yes votes	No votes	% Yes	Const. Amd.?	type	description
1	Yes	327,220	252,372	56.46%	Yes	Leg	Authorize Bonds for Education Building Program

1964 General Election
meas. num.	passed	Yes votes	No votes	% Yes	Const. Amd.?	type	description
1	Yes	455,654	302,105	60.13%	Yes	Leg	Capital Punishment Bill
2	Yes	477,031	238,241	66.69%	Yes	Leg	Leasing Property for State Use
3	No	205,182	549,414	27.19%	No	Init	Amending State Workmen's Compensation Law
4	No	221,797	534,731	29.32%	No	Init	Prohibiting Commercial Fishing for Salmon, Steelhead

=== 1966 ===
May 1966 Election
meas. num.	passed	Yes votes	No votes	% Yes	Const. Amd.?	type	description
1	Yes	310,743	181,957	63.07%	No	Leg	Cigarette Tax Bill
2	No	197,096	267,319	42.44%	Yes	Leg	Superintendent of Public Instruction Constitutional Amendment

1966 General Election
meas. num.	passed	Yes votes	No votes	% Yes	Const. Amd.?	type	description
1	Yes	468,103	123,964	79.06%	Yes	Leg	Public Transportation System Employees Constitutional Amendment
2	No	237,282	332,983	41.61%	Yes	Leg	State Bonds for Educational Facilities

=== 1968 ===
May 1968 Election
meas. num.	passed	Yes votes	No votes	% Yes	Const. Amd.?	type	description
1	Yes	372,915	226,191	62.25%	Yes	Leg	Common School Fund Constitutional Amendment
2	Yes	321,731	244,750	56.79%	Yes	Leg	Constitutional Amendment Changing Initiative—Referendum Requirements
3	Yes	353,383	261,014	57.52%	Yes	Leg	Higher Education and Community College Bonds

1968 General Election
meas. num.	passed	Yes votes	No votes	% Yes	Const. Amd.?	type	description
1	Yes	651,250	96,065	87.15%	Yes	Leg	Constitutional Amendment Broadening Veterans Loan Eligibility
2	Yes	690,989	56,973	92.38%	Yes	Leg	Constitutional Amendment for Removal of Judges
3	Yes	588,166	143,768	80.36%	Yes	Leg	Empowering Legislature to Extend Ocean Boundaries
4	No	331,617	348,866	48.73%	Yes	Leg	Constitutional Amendment Broadening County Debt Limitation
5	Yes	393,789	278,483	58.58%	Yes	Leg	Government Consolidation City-County Over 300,000
6	No	315,175	464,140	40.44%	Yes	Init	Bond Issue to Acquire Ocean Beaches
7	No	276,451	503,443	35.45%	Yes	Init	Constitutional Amendment Changing Property Tax Limitation

=== 1969 ===
June 1969 Special Election
meas. num.	passed	Yes votes	No votes	% Yes	Const. Amd.?	type	description
1	No	65,077	504,274	11.43%	Yes	Leg	Property Tax Relief and Sales Tax

== 1970s ==
May 1970 Primary Election
meas. num.	passed	Yes votes	No votes	% Yes	Const. Amd.?	type	description
1	No	190,257	300,126	38.80%	Yes	Leg	Capital Construction Bonds for State Government
2	Yes	326,374	168,464	65.96%	Yes	Leg	Repeals "White Foreigner" Section of Constitution
3	No	182,074	322,682	36.07%	Yes	Leg	Revised Constitution for Oregon
4	Yes	292,234	213,835	57.75%	Yes	Leg	Pollution Control Bonds
5	No	202,018	336,527	37.51%	Yes	Leg	Lowers Oregon Voting Age to 19
6	No	180,602	323,189	35.85%	Yes	Leg	Local School Property Tax Equalization Measure

1970 General Election
meas. num.	passed	Yes votes	No votes	% Yes	Const. Amd.?	type	description
1	No	261,428	340,104	43.46%	Yes	Leg	Constitutional Amendment Concerning Convening of Legislature
2	Yes	342,138	269,467	55.94%	Yes	Leg	Automatic Adoption, Federal Income Tax Amendments
3	No	283,659	294,186	49.09%	Yes	Leg	Constitutional Amendment Concerning County Debt Limitation
4	Yes	332,188	268,588	55.29%	Yes	Leg	Investing Funds Donated to Higher Education
5	Yes	481,031	133,564	78.27%	Yes	Leg	Veterans' Loan Amendment
6	Yes	436,897	158,409	73.39%	Yes	Leg	Limits Term of Defeated Incumbents
7	No	269,372	318,651	45.81%	Yes	Leg	Constitutional Amendment Authorizing Education Bonds
8	Yes	352,771	260,100	57.56%	Yes	Leg	Allows Penal Institutions Anywhere in Oregon
9	Yes	406,315	214,243	65.48%	No	Init	Scenic Waterways Bill
10	No	223,735	405,437	35.56%	Yes	Init	New Property Tax Bases for Schools
11	No	272,765	342,503	44.33%	Yes	Init	Restricts Governmental Powers Over Rural Property

=== 1972 ===
January 1972 Special Election
meas. num.	passed	Yes votes	No votes	% Yes	Const. Amd.?	type	description
1	Yes	245,717	236,937	50.91%	No	Ref	Increases cigarette tax

May 1972 Primary Election
meas. num.	passed	Yes votes	No votes	% Yes	Const. Amd.?	type	description
1	No	327,231	349,746	48.34%	Yes	Leg	Eliminates literacy requirement; lowers voting age
2	Yes	420,568	206,436	67.08%	Yes	Leg	Repeals requirement for decennial state census
3	No	241,371	391,698	38.13%	Yes	Leg	Allows legislators to call special sessions
4	No	232,391	364,323	38.95%	Yes	Leg	Capital construction bonds for state government
5	No	233,175	374,295	38.38%	Yes	Leg	Irrigation and water development bonds
6	No	120,027	491,551	19.63%	Yes	Leg	Enabling county-city vehicle registration tax

- 7 — Repealed Governors Retirement Act that was created through House Bill 1728 in 1971 that provided lifetime pensions for Oregon governors who served at least two years. The measure passed with little objection.

1972 General Election
meas. num.	passed	Yes votes	No votes	% Yes	Const. Amd.?	type	description
1	Yes	594,080	232,948	71.83%	Yes	Leg	Eliminates location requirements for state institutions
2	Yes	572,619	281,720	67.02%	Yes	Leg	Qualifications for sheriff set by legislature
3	No	329,669	462,932	41.59%	Yes	Leg	Amends county purchase and lease limitations
4	No	336,382	519,196	39.32%	Yes	Leg	Changes provision regarding religion
5	Yes	591,191	265,636	69.00%	Yes	Leg	Minimum jury size of six members
6	Yes	736,802	133,139	84.70%	Yes	Leg	Broadens eligibility for veterans loans
7	Yes	571,959	292,561	66.16%	Yes	Leg	Repeals Governor's retirement act
8	Yes	697,297	151,174	82.18%	Yes	Leg	Changes succession to office of Governor
9	No	342,885	558,136	38.06%	Yes	Leg	Prohibits property tax for school operations

=== 1973 ===
May 1973 Special Election
meas. num.	passed	Yes votes	No votes	% Yes	Const. Amd.?	type	description
1	No	253,682	358,219	41.46%	No	Leg	Property tax limitation; school tax revision

=== 1974 ===
May 1974 Election
meas. num.	passed	Yes votes	No votes	% Yes	Const. Amd.?	type	description
1	No	136,851	410,733	24.99%	No	Leg	Income, corporate tax, school support increase
2	No	190,899	369,038	34.09%	Yes	Leg	Highway fund use for mass transit
3	No	166,363	371,897	30.91%	Yes	Leg	New school district tax base limitation
4	No	198,563	328,221	37.69%	Yes	Leg	Authorizes bonds for water development fund
5	Yes	381,559	164,953	69.82%	Yes	Leg	Increases veteran's loan bonding authority
6	No	246,525	298,373	45.24%	Yes	Leg	Permits legislature to call special session

1974 General Election
meas. num.	passed	Yes votes	No votes	% Yes	Const. Amd.?	type	description
1	No	353,357	384,521	47.89%	Yes	Leg	Liquor licenses for public passenger carriers
2	Yes	546,255	165,778	76.72%	Yes	Leg	Opens all legislative deliberations to public
3	Yes	437,557	246,902	63.93%	Yes	Leg	Revises constitutional requirements for grand juries
4	Yes	381,593	331,756	53.49%	Yes	Leg	Governor vacancy successor age requirement eliminated
5							(moved to May 1974 election by special session of the legislature)
6	Yes	552,737	146,364	79.06%	Yes	Leg	Permits establishing qualifications for county assessors
7	No	322,023	329,858	49.40%	Yes	Leg	Tax base includes revenue sharing money
8	No	337,565	378,071	47.17%	Yes	Leg	Revises school district election voting requirements
9	No	218,846	476,547	31.47%	Yes	Leg	Permits state employees to be legislators
10	Yes	362,731	355,506	50.50%	Yes	Leg	Revises Oregon voter qualification requirements
11	Yes	480,631	216,853	68.91%	Yes	Leg	Right to jury in civil cases
12	No	277,723	376,747	42.43%	Yes	Leg	Community development fund bonds
13	Yes	393,743	352,958	52.73%	No	Ref	Obscenity and sexual conduct bill
14	Yes	498,002	177,946	73.67%	No	Leg	Public officials' financial ethics and reporting; also referred to all 36 counties and 243 cities with governing bodies
15	Yes	458,417	274,182	62.57%	No	Init	Prohibits purchase or sale of Steelhead

=== 1976 ===
May 1976 Primary Election
meas. num.	passed	Yes votes	No votes	% Yes	Const. Amd.?	type	description
1	Yes	549,553	158,997	77.56%	Yes	Leg	Expands Veterans' home-farm loan eligibility
2	Yes	639,977	59,774	91.46%	Yes	Leg	Discipline of judges
3	Yes	315,588	362,414	46.55%	Yes	Leg	Housing bonds
4	No	170,331	531,219	24.28%	Yes	Leg	Authorizes vehicle tax mass transit use

1976 General Election
meas. num.	passed	Yes votes	No votes	% Yes	Const. Amd.?	type	description
1	Yes	607,325	247,843	71.02%	Yes	Leg	Validates inadvertently superseded statutory amendments
2	No	376,489	536,967	41.22%	Yes	Leg	Allows changing city, county election days
3	No	285,777	679,517	29.61%	Yes	Leg	Lowers minimum age for legislative service
4	Yes	507,308	368,646	57.91%	Yes	Leg	Repeals emergency succession provision
5	Yes	549,126	377,354	59.27%	Yes	Leg	Permits legislature to call special session
6	Yes	682,252	281,696	70.78%	Yes	Leg	Allows charitable, fraternal, religious organizations bingo
7	No	263,738	659,327	28.57%	No	Leg	Partial public funding of election campaigns
8	No	465,143	505,124	47.94%	No	Ref	Increases motor fuel, ton-mile taxes
9	No	423,008	584,845	41.97%	No	Init	Regulates nuclear power plant construction approval
10	No	402,608	536,502	42.87%	No	Init	Repeals land use planning coordination statutes
11	No	419,567	555,981	43.01%	No	Init	Prohibits adding fluorides to water systems
12	No	333,933	525,868	38.84%	No	Init	Repeals intergovernmental cooperation, planning district statutes

=== 1977 ===
May 1977 Election
meas. num.	passed	Yes votes	No votes	% Yes	Const. Amd.?	type	description
1	No	112,570	252,061	30.87%	Yes	Leg	School operating levy measure
2	Yes	200,270	158,436	55.83%	Yes	Leg	Authorizes additional veterans' fund uses
3	Yes	250,783	106,953	70.10%	Yes	Leg	Increases Veterans' loan bonding authority

1977 Special Election
meas. num.	passed	Yes votes	No votes	% Yes	Const. Amd.?	type	description
1	Yes	124,484	118,953	51.14%	Yes	Leg	Water development loan fund created
2	No	105,219	137,693	43.32%	Yes	Leg	Development of non-nuclear energy resources

=== 1978 ===
May 1978 Election
meas. num.	passed	Yes votes	No votes	% Yes	Const. Amd.?	type	description
1	Yes	306,506	156,623	66.18%	Yes	Leg	Home rule county initiative-referendum requirements
2	Yes	435,338	80,176	84.45%	Yes	Leg	Open meetings rules for legislature
3	Yes	291,778	250,810	53.78%	Yes	Leg	Housing for low income elderly
4	No	148,822	351,843	29.72%	Yes	Leg	Domestic water fund created
5	No	190,301	365,170	34.26%	No	Leg	Highway repair priority, gas tax increase
6	Yes	110,600	91,090	54.84%	No	Leg	Reorganizes metropolitan service district, abolishes CRAG

1978 General Election
meas. num.	passed	Yes votes	No votes	% Yes	Const. Amd.?	type	description
1	No	358,504	449,132	44.39%	Yes	Leg	Appellate judge selection, running on record
2	Yes	468,458	349,604	57.26%	Yes	Leg	Authorizes senate confirmation of Governor's appointments
3	No	208,722	673,802	23.65%	No	Ref	Vehicle and fee increase referendum
4	No	375,587	471,027	44.36%	No	Init	Shortens formation procedures for people's utility districts
5	Yes	704,480	201,463	77.76%	No	Init	Authorizes, regulates practice of denture technology
6	No	424,029	453,741	48.31%	Yes	Init	Limitations on ad valorem property taxes
7	No	431,577	461,542	48.32%	Yes	Init	Prohibits state expenditures, programs or services for abortion
8	Yes	573,707	318,610	64.29%	No	Init	Requires death penalty for murder under specified conditions
9	Yes	589,361	267,132	68.81%	No	Init	Limitations of public utility rate base
10	No	334,523	515,138	39.37%	Yes	Init	Land use planning, zoning constitutional amendment
11	No	383,532	467,765	45.05%	Yes	Leg	Reduces property tax payable by homeowner and renter
12	Yes	641,862	134,758	82.65%	No	Leg	Support of federal constitutional amendment requiring balanced budget

== 1980s ==
May 1980 Special Election
meas. num.	passed	Yes votes	No votes	% Yes	Const. Amd.?	type	description
1	Yes	451,695	257,230	63.72%	Yes	Leg	Limits uses of gasoline and highway user taxes
2	No	325,030	384,346	45.82%	Yes	Leg	Amends liquor by the drink
3	Yes	394,466	278,125	58.65%	Yes	Leg	State bonds for small-scale local energy project loan fund
4	Yes	574,148	130,452	81.49%	Yes	Leg	Veterans' home and farm loan eligibility changes
5	Yes	636,565	64,979	90.74%	No	Leg	Continues tax reduction program
6	Yes	536,002	138,675	79.45%	Yes	Leg	Definition of multifamily low income elderly housing

1980 General Election
meas. num.	passed	Yes votes	No votes	% Yes	Const. Amd.?	Type	description
1	No	291,142	820,892	26.18%	Yes	Leg	Repeal constitutional provision requiring elected superintendent of public instruction
2	Yes	678,573	455,020	59.86%	Yes	Leg	Guarantees mentally handicapped voting rights, unless adjudged incompetent to vote
3	Yes	594,520	500,586	54.29%	Yes	Leg	Dedicates oil, natural gas taxes to common school fund
4	No	298,421	849,745	25.99%	No	Leg	Increases gas tax from seven to nine cents per gallon
5	No	425,890	728,173	36.90%	No	Init	Forbids use, sale of snare, leghold traps for most purposes
6	No	416,029	711,617	36.89%	Yes	Init	Real property tax limit preserving 85% Districts' 1977 revenue
7	Yes	608,412	535,049	53.21%	No	Init	Nuclear plant licensing requires voter approval, waste disposal facility existence
8	No	523,955	551,383	48.72%	Yes	Leg	State bonds for fund to finance correctional facilities

=== 1982 ===
May 1982 Special Election
meas. num.	passed	Yes votes	No votes	% Yes	Const. Amd.?	Type	description
1	Yes	333,656	267,137	55.54%	Yes	Leg	Use of state bond proceeds to finance municipal water projects
2	Yes	389,820	229,049	62.99%	Yes	Leg	Multifamily housing for elderly and disabled persons
3	No	281,548	333,476	45.78%	Yes	Leg	State bonds to fund corrections facilities
4	No	308,574	323,268	48.84%	No	Leg	Raises taxes on commercial vehicles, motor vehicles fuels for roads
5	No	159,811	453,415	26.06%	No	Leg	Governor to appoint chief justice of Oregon Supreme Court

1982 General Election
meas. num.	passed	Yes votes	No votes	% Yes	Const. Amd.?	Type	description
1	No	219,034	768,150	22.19%	Yes	Leg	Increases tax base when new property construction increases district's value
2	No	385,672	604,864	38.94%	Yes	Leg	Lengthens Governor's time for postsession veto or approval of bills
3	No	504,836	515,626	49.47%	Yes	Init	Real property tax limit preserving 85% districts' 1979 revenue
4	No	440,824	597,970	42.44%	No	Init	Permits self-service dispensing of motor vehicle fuel at retail
5	Yes	623,089	387,907	61.63%	n/a	Init	People of Oregon urge mutual freeze on nuclear weapons development
6	No	461,271	565,056	44.94%	No	Init	Ends state's land use planning powers, retains local planning

=== 1984 ===
May 1984 Special Election
meas. num.	passed	Yes votes	No votes	% Yes	Const. Amd.?	Type	description
1	No	332,175	365,571	47.61%	Yes	Leg	State may borrow and lend money for public works projects
2	No	234,060	487,457	32.44%	No	Leg	Increases fees for licensing and registration of motor vehicles

1984 General Election
meas. num.	passed	Yes votes	No votes	% Yes	Const. Amd.?	Type	description
1	Yes	664,464	470,139	58.56%	Yes	Leg	Change minimum requirements for recall of public officers
2	No	599,424	616,252	49.31%	Yes	Leg	Real property tax limit
3	Yes	637,968	556,826	53.40%	No	Init	Create Citizens' Utility Board
4	Yes	794,441	412,341	65.83%	Yes	Init	Establish state lottery, commission, profits for ecoNomic development
5	Yes	786,933	399,231	66.34%	No	Init	Provisions for state operated lottery if authorized
6	Yes	653,009	521,687	55.59%	Yes	Init	Exempts death sentences from constitutional guarantees against cruel, vindictive punishments
7	Yes	893,818	295,988	75.12%	No	Init	Requires by statute death or mandatory imprisonment for aggravated murder
8	No	552,410	597,964	48.02%	No	Init	Revises numerous criminal laws concerning police powers, trials, evidence, sentencing
9	Yes	655,973	524,214	55.58%	No	Init	Adds requirements for disposing wastes containing naturally occurring radioactive isotopes

=== 1985 ===
September 1985 special election
meas. num.	passed	Yes votes	No votes	% Yes	Const. Amd.?	Type	description
1	No	189,733	664,365	22.21%	Yes	Leg	Allow 5% sales tax for local education

=== 1986 ===
May 1986 Election
meas. num.	passed	Yes votes	No votes	% Yes	Const. Amd.?	Type	description
1	Yes	534,476	118,766	81.82%	Yes	Leg	Bans Income Tax on Social Security Benefits
2	Yes	333,277	230,886	59.07%	Yes	Leg	Effect on Merger of Taxing Units on Tax Base
3	Yes	460,148	132,101	77.70%	Yes	Leg	Verification of Signatures on Initiative and Referendum Petitions
4	Yes	343,005	269,305	56.02%	Yes	Leg	Requires Special Election for US Senator Vacancy, Removes Constitutional Provision
5	No	300,674	330,429	47.64%	Yes	Leg	$96 Million Bonds for State-County Prison Buildings

1986 General Election
meas. num.	passed	Yes votes	No votes	% Yes	Const. Amd.?	Type	description
1	Yes	771,959	265,999	74.37%	Yes	Leg	Deletes Constitutional Requirement that Secretary of State Live in Salem
2	Yes	637,410	291,355	68.63%	Yes	Leg	Revises Legislative District Reapportionment Procedures After Federal Census
3	Yes	736,739	302,957	70.86%	Yes	Leg	Allows Charitable, Fraternal, Religious Organizations to Conduct Raffles
4	Yes	724,577	297,973	70.86%	No	Leg	Replaces Public Utility Commissioner with Three Member Public Utility Commission
5	No	279,479	781,922	26.33%	No	Init	Legalizes Private Possession and Growing of Marijuana for Personal Use
6	No	477,920	580,163	45.17%	Yes	Init	Prohibits State Funding Abortions. Exception: Prevent Mother's Death
7	No	234,804	816,369	22.34%	Yes	Init	5% Sales Tax, Funds Schools, Reduces Property Tax
8	Yes	802,099	201,918	79.89%	No	Init	Prohibits Mandatory Local Measured Telephone Service Except Mobile Phone Service
9	No	449,548	584,396	43.48%	Yes	Init	Limits Property Tax Rates and Assessed Value Increases
10	Yes	774,766	251,509	75.49%	No	Init	Revises Many Criminal Laws Concerning Victims' Rights, Evidence, Sentencing, Parole
11	No	381,727	639,034	37.40%	Yes	Init	Homeowner's, Renter's Property Tax Relief Program; Sales Tax Limitation Measure
12	No	299,551	720,034	29.38%	No	Init	State Income Tax Changes, Increased Revenue to Property Tax Relief
13	Yes	693,460	343,450	66.88%	Yes	Init	Twenty Day Pre-election Voter Registration Cutoff
14	No	375,241	674,641	35.74%	No	Init	Prohibits Nuclear Power Plant Operation Until Permanent Waste Site Licensed
15	No	424,099	558,741	43.15%	No	Init	Supersedes "Radioactive Waste" Definition; Changes Energy Facility Payment Procedure
16	No	400,119	590,971	40.37%	No	Init	Phases Out Nuclear Weapons Manufactured With Tax Credits, Civil Penalty

=== 1987 ===
May 1987 Election
meas. num.	Passed	Yes votes	No votes	% Yes	Const. Amd.?	Type	description
1	Yes	299,581	100,854	74.81%	No	Leg	State role in selecting nuclear waste repository
2	Yes	223,417	178,839	55.54%	Yes	Leg	Continue existing tax base levies to prevent school closures

=== 1988 ===
May 1988 Primary Election
Meas. num.	Passed?	Yes votes	No votes	% Yes	Measure
1	Yes	485,629	191,008	71.77%	Authorizes Water Development Fund Loans for Fish Protection, Watershed Restoration—L1
2	Yes	486,401	224,655	68.41%	Protective Headgear for Motorcycle Operators and Passengers and Moped Riders—L2

1988 General Election
Meas. num.	Passed?	Yes votes	No votes	% Yes	Measure
1	Yes	615,012	520,939	54.14%	Extends Governor's Veto Deadline After Legislature Adjourns; Requires Prior Announcement—L1
2	Yes	621,894	510,694	54.91%	Common School Fund Investments; Using Income for State Lands Management—L1
3	No	528,324	684,747	43.55%	Requires the Use of Safety Belts—L2
4	Yes	947,805	252,985	78.93%	Requires Full Sentences Without Parole, Probation for Certain Repeat Felonies—I2
5	No	449,797	759,360	37.20%	Finances Intercollegiate Athletic Fund by Increasing Malt Beverage, Cigarette Taxes—I2
6	No	430,147	737,779	36.83%	Indoor Clean Air Law Revisions Banning Public Smoking—I2
7	Yes	663,604	516,998	56.21%	Oregon Scenic Waterway System—I2 added almost 500 miles of protected waterways to the Oregon Scenic Waterways System (which was formed through an initiative passed in 1970, the original Oregon Scenic Waterways Act). The measure passed 663,604 votes to 516,998 votes. The chief petitioners were Ray Atkeson, Harry Lonsdale and Roy Bowden.
8	Yes	626,751	561,355	52.75%	Revokes Ban on Sexual Orientation Discrimination in State Executive Branch—I2

=== 1989 ===
May 1989 Special Election
Meas num	Passed?	Yes votes	No votes	% Yes	Const Amd	Type	Ballot Title - and Notes
1	No	183,818	263,283	41.1	Yes	Leg	Establishes New Tax Base Limits on Schools

June 1989 Special Election
Meas num	Passed?	Yes votes	No votes votes	% Yes	Const Amd	Type	Ballot Title - and Notes
1	Yes	340,506	141,649	70.6	Yes	Leg	Removes Constitutional Limitation on Use of Property Forfeited To State
2	Yes	446,151	48,558	90.2	Yes	Leg	Prohibits Selling/Exporting Timber from State Lands Unless Oregon Processed

== 1990s ==
=== 1990 ===
==== May ====
1990 Primary Election
Meas. Num.	Passed?	Yes votes	No votes	% Yes	Const. Amd.	Type	Ballot Title - and Notes
1	No	294,099	324,458	47.5	Yes	Leg	Permits Using Local Vehicle Taxes for Transit if Voters Approve
2	Yes	352,922	248,123	58.7	Yes	Leg	Allows Pollution Control Bond Use for Related Activities
3	No	294,664	299,831	49.6	Yes	Leg	Requires Annual Legislative Sessions of Limited Duration
4	No	4,234	4,745	47.2	No	Leg	Amends Laws on Organization of International Port of Coos Bay
5A	Yes	462,090	140,747	76.7	No	Leg	Advisory Vote: Changing the School Finance System
5B	No	177,964	408,842	30.3	No	Leg	Advisory Vote: Income Tax Increase Reducing Homeowner School Property Taxes
5C	No	128,642	449,725	22.2	No	Leg	Advisory Vote: Income Tax Increase Eliminating Homeowner School Property Taxes
5D	No	202,367	385,820	34.4	No	Leg	Advisory Vote: Sales Tax Reducing School Property Taxes
5E	No	222,611	374,466	37.3	No	Leg	Advisory Vote: Sales Tax Eliminating School Property Taxes

==== November ====
1990 General Election
Meas. Num.	Passed?	Yes votes	No votes	% Yes	Const. Amd.	Type	Ballot Title - and Notes
1	Yes	510,947	491,170	51	Yes	Leg	Grants Metropolitan Service District Electors Right to Home Rule
2	Yes	680,463	354,288	65.8	Yes	Leg	Allows Merged School Districts to Combine Tax Bases
3	No	406,372	617,586	39.7	N/A	REF	Repeals Tax Exemption, Grants Additional Benefit Payments for PERS Retirees
4	No	446,795	660,992	40.3	No	Init	Prohibits Trojan Operation Until Nuclear Waste, Cost, Earthquake Standards Met – one of several measures aiming to close Trojan
5	Yes	574,833	522,022	52.4	Yes	Init	Limit on Property Taxes for Schools, Government Operations landmark tax law, limited property taxes and moved school funding from local to state control. Follow up measures 47 (1996) and 50 (1997) addressed property taxes as well.
6	No	467,418	636,804	42.3	No	Init	Product Packaging Must Meet Recycling Standards or Receive Hardship Waiver
7	Yes	624,744	452,853	58	No	Init	Six-County Work in Lieu of Welfare Benefits Pilot Program
8	No	355,963	747,599	32.3	Yes	Init	Prohibit Abortion With Three Exceptions
9	Yes	598,460	512,872	53.9	No	Init	Requires the Use of Safety Belts
10	No	530,851	577,806	47.9	No	Init	Doctor Must Give Parent Notice Before MiNor's Abortion
11	No	351,977	741,863	32.2	Yes	Init	School Choice System, Tax Credit for Education Outside Public Schools

=== 1992 ===
==== May ====
1992 Primary Election
Meas. Num.	Passed?	Yes votes	No votes	% Yes	Const. Amd.	Type	Ballot Title - and Notes
1	No	244,173	451,715	35.1	Yes	Leg	Future Fuel Taxes May Go to Police

==== November ====
1992 General Election
Meas. Num.	Passed?	Yes votes	No votes	% votes	Const. Amd.	Type	Ballot Title - and Notes
1	No	653,062	786,017	45.4	Yes	Leg	Bonds May be Issued for State Parks
2	No	399,259	1,039,322	27.8	Yes	Leg	Future Fuel Taxes May Go to Parks
3	Yes	1,003,706	439,694	69.5	Yes	Init	Limits Terms for Legislature, Statewide Offices, Congressional Offices - established term limits for state and federal elected positions. Federal provisions overturned in 1995, state provisions overturned in 2002.
4	No	567,467	896,778	38.8	No	Init	Bans Operation of Triple Truck-Trailer Combinations on Oregon Highways
5	No	585,051	874,636	40.1	No	Init	Closes Trojan Until Nuclear Waste, Cost, Earthquake, Health Conditions Met - Measures 5 and 6, aiming to close Trojan Nuclear Power Plant, defeated; PGE spent $5 million opposing, a record high expenditure Not exceeded until 2007.
6	No	619,329	830,850	42.7	No	Init	Bans Trojan Power Operation Unless Earthquake, Waste Storage Conditions Met - see above
7	No	362,621	1,077,206	25.2	Yes	Init	Raises Tax Limit on Certain Property; Residential Renters' Tax Relief
8	No	576,633	828,096	41	No	Init	Restricts Lower Columbia Fish Harvests to Most Selective Means Available
9	No	638,527	828,290	43.5	Yes	Init	Government Cannot Facilitate, Must Discourage Homosexuality, Other "Behaviors"

=== 1993 ===
==== June ====
June 1993 Special Election
Meas. Num.	Passed?	Yes votes	No votes	% Yes	Const. Amd.	Type	Ballot Title - and Notes
1	No	180,070	482,714	27.2	No	Leg	Allows Voter Approval of Urban Renewal Bond Repayment Outside Limit

==== November ====
November 1993 Special Election
Meas. Num.	Passed?	Yes votes	No votes	% Yes	Const. Amd.	Type	Ballot Title - and Notes
1	No	240,991	721,930	25.0	No	Leg	Should We Pass A 5% Sales Tax for Public Schools with these Restrictions?

=== 1994 ===
==== May ====
1994 Primary Election
Meas. Num.	Passed?	Yes votes	No votes	% Yes	Const. Amd.	Type	Ballot Title - and Notes
2	No	158,028	446,665	26.1	No	Leg	Allows New Motor Vehicle Fuel Revenues for Dedicated Purposes

==== November ====
1994 General Election
Meas. Num.	Passed?	Yes votes	No votes	% votes	Const. Amd.	Type	Ballot Title - and Notes
3	Yes	776,197	382,126	67.0	Yes	Leg	Changes Deadline for Filling Vacancies at General Election
4	Yes	1,055,111	145,499	87.9	Yes	Leg	Creates Vacancy if State Legislator Convicted of Felony
5	No	543,302	671,025	44.7	Yes	Init	Bars New or Increased Taxes without Voter Approval
6	Yes	628,180	555,019	53.1	Yes	Init	Candidates May Use Only Contributions from District Residents (struck down as unconstitutional in Federal court)
7	No	512,980	671,021	43.3	Yes	Init	Guarantees Equal Protection: Lists Prohibited Grounds of Discrimination
8	Yes	611,760	610,776	50.0	Yes	Init	Public Employees Pay Part of Salary for Pension – required public employees to contribute 6% of their salary to their pension, overturned in 1996 by the courts in Oregon State Police Officers' Ass'n v. State.
9	Yes	851,014	324,224	72.4	No	Init	Adopts Contribution and Spending Limits, Other Campaign Finance Law Changes. Limited contributions to $100 for legislative candidates, $500 for statewide candidates. Most provisions struck down by Oregon Supreme Court in February 1997.
10	Yes	763,507	415,678	64.7	Yes	Init	Legislature Cannot Reduce Voter-Approved Sentence Without 2/3 Vote
11	Yes	788,695	412,816	65.6	No	Init	Mandatory Sentences for Listed Felonies; Covers Persons 15 and Up — established mandatory minimum sentences for certain violent felonies, required adult trials and sentencing for those felonies for defendants over age 15.
12	No	450,553	731,146	38.1	No	Init	Repeals Prevailing Rate Wage Requirement for Workers on Public Works
13	No	592,746	630,628	48.5	Yes	Init	Governments Cannot Approve, Create Classifications Based on, Homosexuality — also known as the "Minority Status and Child Protection Act", would have restricted public library access to materials dealing with homosexuality. (see also Oregon Ballot Measure 9 (1992).)
14	No	500,005	679,936	42.4	Yes	Init	Amends Chemical Process Mining Laws: Adds Requirements, Prohibitions, Standards, Fees
15	No	438,018	760,853	36.5	Yes	Init	State Must Maintain Funding for Schools, Community Colleges
16	Yes	627,980	596,018	51.3	No	Init	Allows Terminally Ill Adults to Obtain Prescription for Lethal Drugs — legalized doctor-assisted suicide. (aka "Death with Dignity Act")
17	Yes	859,896	350,541	71.0	Yes	Init	Requires State Prison Inmates to Work Full Time
18	Yes	629,527	586,026	51.8	No	Init	Bans Hunting Bears with Bait, Hunting Bears, Cougars with Dogs
19	No	549,754	652,139	45.7	Yes	Init	No Free Speech Protection for Obscenity, Child Pornography — would have amended state constitution to exempt obscenity from the state constitution's free speech protections.
20	No	284,195	898,416	24.0	Yes	Init	Equal Tax on Trade Replaces Current Taxes

Note: Detailed information about elections from 1995 to the present, including ballot measure text, sponsorship, and arguments for and against, may be found at the Oregon Secretary of State's web site.

=== 1995 ===
==== May ====
May 1995 Special Election
Meas. Num.	Passed?	Yes votes	No votes	% Yes	Const. Amd.?	Type	Ballot Title
21	Yes	671,027	99,728	87.06%	Yes	Leg	Dedicates portion of lottery funds to education
22	Yes	709,931	45,311	94.00%	Yes	Leg	Inhabitancy in state legislative districts

=== 1996 ===
==== May ====
1996 Primary Election
Meas. Num.	Passed?	Yes votes	No votes	% Yes	Const. Amd.	Type	Ballot Title - and Notes
23	Yes	466,580	177,218	72.47%	Yes	Leg	Increases Minimum Value in Controversy Required to Obtain Jury Trial
24	No	279,399	360,592	43.66%	Yes	Leg	Initiative Petition Signatures Must Be Collected From Each Congressional District
25	Yes	349,918	289,930	54.69%	Yes	Leg	Requires 3/5 Majority in Legislature to Pass Revenue-Raising Bills

==== November ====
1996 General Election
Meas. Num.	Passed?	Yes votes	No votes	% Yes	Const. Amd.	Type	Ballot Title – and Notes
26	Yes	878,677	440,283	66.62%	Yes	Leg	Changes the Principles that Govern Laws for Punishment of Crime
27	No	349,050	938,819	27.1%	Yes	Leg	Grants Legislature New Power Over Both New, Existing Administrative Rules
28	Yes	708,341	593,136	54.43%	Yes	Leg	Repeals Certain Residency Requirements for State Veterans' Loans
29	No	335,057	958,947	25.89%	Yes	Leg	Governor's Appointees Must Vacate Office If Successor Not Timely Confirmed
30	Yes	731,127	566,168	56.36%	Yes	Leg	State Must Pay Local Governments Costs of State-Mandated Programs
31	No	630,980	706,974	47.16%	Yes	Leg	Obscenity May Receive No Greater Protection Than Under Federal Constitution
32	No	622,764	704,970	46.9	No	REF	Authorizes Bonds for Portland Region Light Rail, Transportation Projects Elsewhere
33	No	638,824	652,811	49.46%	Yes	Init	Limits Legislative Change to Statutes Passed by Voters
34	No	570,803	762,979	42.8%	No	Init	Wildlife Management Exclusive to Commission; Repeals1994 Bear/Cougar Initiative
35	No	441,108	807,987	35.31%	No	Init	Restricts Bases for Providers to Receive Pay for Health Care
36	Yes	769,725	584,303	56.85%	No	Init	Increases Minimum Hourly Wage to $6.50 Over Three Years
37	No	540,645	818,336	39.78%	No	Init	Broadens Types of Beverage Containers Requiring Deposit and Refund Value
38	No	479,921	852,661	36.01%	No	Init	Prohibits Livestock in Certain Polluted Waters or on Adjacent Lands
39	No	569,037	726,824	43.91%	Yes	Init	Government, Private Entities Cannot Discriminate Among Health Care Provider Categories
40	Yes	778,574	544,301	58.85%	Yes	Init	Gives Crime Victims Rights, Expands Admissible Evidence, Limits Pretrial Release – passed, but nullified by the Oregon Supreme Court for affecting multiple portions of the constitution. Spawned multiple measures in 1999.
41	No	446,115	838,088	34.74%	Yes	Init	States How Public Employee Earnings Must Be Expressed
42	No	460,553	857,878	34.93%	Yes	Init	Requires Testing of Public School Students; Public Report
43	No	547,131	707,586	43.61%	No	Init	Amends Collective Bargaining Law for Public Safety Employees
44	Yes	759,048	598,543	55.91%	No	Init	Increases, Adds Cigarette and Tobacco Taxes; Changes Tax Revenue Distribution – increased cigarette tax by 30 cents per pack
45	No	458,238	866,461	34.59%	Yes	Init	Raises Public Employees' Normal Retirement Age; Reduces Benefits
46	No	158,555	1,180,148	11.84%	Yes	Init	Counts Non-Voters As "No" Votes on Tax Measures
47	Yes	704,554	642,613	52.3%	Yes	Init	Reduces and Limits Property Taxes; Limits Local Revenues, Replacement Fees – limited property taxes, required double-majority for some local tax increases.
48	No	624,771	671,095	48.21%	Yes	Init	Instructs State, Federal Legislators to Vote for Congressional Term Limits

=== 1997 ===
==== May ====
1997 Special Election
Meas. Num.	Passed?	Yes votes	No votes	% Yes	Const. Amd.	Type	Ballot Title – and Notes
49	Yes	699,813	70,940	90.8%	Yes	Leg	Restricts Inmate Lawsuits; Allows Interstate Shipment of Prison Made Products
50	Yes	429,943	341,781	55.71%	Yes	Leg	Limits Assessed Value of Property for Tax Purposes; Limits Property Tax Rates – replaced Measure 47 (1996)

==== November ====
1997 General Election
Meas. Num.	Passed?	Yes votes	No votes	% Yes	Const Amd.	Type	Ballot Title – and Notes
51	No	445,830	666,275	40.09%	No	Leg	Repeals Law Allowing Terminally Ill Adults To Obtain Lethal Prescription – would have repealed Oregon Death with Dignity Act
52	Yes	805,742	293,425	73.3%	No	Leg	Authorizes State Lottery Bond Program To Finance Public School Projects

=== 1998 ===
==== May ====
1998 Primary Election Detailed information on measures and official results available from the Oregon Secretary of State's office.
Meas. Num.	Passed?	Yes votes	No votes	% Yes	Const. Amd.?	Type	Ballot Title
53	No	303,539	319,871	48.69%	Yes	Leg	Eliminates Voter Turnout Requirement For Passing Certain Property Tax Measures.Would have eliminated double majority requirement established by Measures 47 and 50.

==== November ====
1998 General Election Detailed information on measures and official results available from the Oregon Secretary of State's office.
Meas. Num.	Passed?	Yes votes	No votes	% Yes	Const. Amd.?	Type	Ballot Title
54	Yes	569,982	474,727	54.56%	Yes	Leg	Authorizes State To Guarantee Bonded Indebtedness Of Certain Education Districts.
55	No	456,464	579,251	44.07%	Yes	Leg	Permits State To Guarantee Earnings On Prepaid Tuition Trust Fund.
56	Yes	874,547	212,737	80.43%	No	Leg	Expands Notice To Landowners Regarding Changes To Land Use Laws.
57	No	371,967	736,968	33.54%	No	REF	Makes Possession Of Limited Amount Of Marijuana Class C Misdemeanor.
58	Yes	621,832	462,084	57.37%	No	Init	Requires Issuing Copy Of Original Oregon Birth Certificate to Adoptees. Allowed adoptees access to original births certificates (and hence, previously secret information about their birth parents).
59	No	539,757	561,952	48.99%	Yes	Init	Prohibits Using Public Resources To Collect Money For Political Purposes.
60	Yes	757,204	334,021	69.39%	No	Init	Requires Vote By Mail In Biennial Primary, General Elections.
61	No				No	Init	Changes Minimum Sentences for Listed Crimes, Including Certain Repeat Offenses. "Vote Not tallied by court order."
62	Yes	721,448	347,112	67.52%	Yes	Init	Requires Campaign Finance Disclosures; Regulates Signature Gathering; Guarantees Contribution Methods.
63	Yes	566,064	457,762	67.52%	Yes	Init	Measures Proposing Supermajority Voting Requirements Require Same Supermajority For Passage.
64	No	215,491	897,535	19.36%	No	Init	Prohibits Many Present Timber Harvest Practices, Imposes More Restrictive Regulations.
65	No	483,811	533,948	47.54%	Yes	Init	Creates Process For Requiring Legislature To Review Administrative Rules. Sought to restrict Legislature's ability to regulate land use.
66	Yes	742,038	362,247	67.20%	Yes	Init	Dedicates Some Lottery Funding To Parks, Beaches; Habitat, Watershed Protection.
67	Yes	611,190	508,263	54.60%	No	Init	Allows Medical Use Of Marijuana Within Limits; Establishes Permit System. Legalized medical marijuana.

=== 1999 ===
==== November ====
1999 Special Election Detailed information on measures and official results available from the Oregon Secretary of State's office.
Meas. Num.	Passed?	Yes votes	No votes	% Yes	Const. Amd.?	Type	Ballot Title
68	Yes	406,526	289,407	58.41%	Yes	Leg	Allows Protecting Business, Certain Government Programs From Prison Work Programs.
69	Yes	406,393	292,419	58.15%	Yes	Leg	Grants Victims Constitutional Rights In Criminal Prosecutions, Juvenile Court Delinquency Proceedings.
70	No	289,783	407,429	41.56%	Yes	Leg	Gives Public, Through Prosecutor, Right To Demand Jury Trial In Criminal Cases.
71	Yes	404,404	292,696	58.01%	Yes	Leg	Limits Pretrial Release Of Accused Person To Protect Victims, Public.
72	No	316,351	382,685	45.26%	Yes	Leg	Allows Murder Conviction By 11 To 1 Jury Verdict.
73	No	320,160	369,843	46.40%	Yes	Leg	Limits Immunity From Criminal Prosecution Of Person Ordered To Testify About His Or Her Conduct.
74	Yes	368,899	325,078	53.16%	Yes	Leg	Requires Terms Of Imprisonment Announced In Court Be Fully Served, With Exceptions.
75	Yes	399,671	292,445	57.75%	Yes	Leg	Persons Convicted Of Certain Crimes Cannot Serve On Grand Juries, Criminal Trial Juries.
76	Yes	372,613	314,351	54.24%	Yes	Leg	Requires Light, Heavy Motor Vehicle Classes Proportionately Share Highway Costs.

== 2000s ==
=== 2000 ===
==== May ====
2000 Primary Election Detailed information about Measures 77-82 and election results available at the Secretary of State's website.
Meas. Num.	Passed?	Yes votes	No votes	% Yes	Const. Amd.?	Type	Ballot Title
77	No	336,253	432,541	43.74%	Yes	Leg	Makes Certain Local Taxing Districts' Temporary Property Tax Authority Permanent
78	Yes	528,129	327,440	61.73%	Yes	Leg	Lengthens Period For Verifying Signatures On Initiative And Referendum Petitions
79	No	356,912	505,081	41.41%	Yes	Leg	Increases Signatures Required To Place Initiative Amending Constitution On Ballot
80	No	310,640	559,941	35.68%	Yes	Leg	Authorizes Using Fuel Tax, Vehicle Fees For Increasing Highway Policing
81	No	219,009	650,348	25.19%	Yes	Leg	Allows Legislature To Limit Recovery Of Damages In Civil Actions
82	No	109,741	767,329	12.51%	No	REF	Repeals Truck Weight—Mile Tax; Establishes And Increases Fuel Taxes

==== November ====
2000 General Election Detailed information about Measures 83-99 and 1-9 and election results available at the Secretary of State's web site.
Meas. Num.	Passed?	Yes votes	No votes	% Yes	Const. Amd.?	Type	Ballot Title
83	Yes	1,084,870	365,203	74.81%	Yes	Leg	Authorizes New Standards, Priorities For Veterans' Loans; Expands Qualified Recipients
84	Yes	1,211,384	222,723	84.47%	Yes	Leg	State Must Continue Paying Local Governments For State—Mandated Programs
85	No	634,307	767,366	45.25%	Yes	Leg	Modifies Population, Minimum Area Requirements For Formation Of New Counties
86	Yes	898,793	550,304	62.02%	Yes	Leg	Requires Refunding General Fund Revenues Exceeding State Estimates To Taxpayers - mandated kicker checks in the state Constitution. (Previous kicker law was a statute.) explanation of measure, page 17 of Voters' Pamphlet
87	No	694,410	771,901	47.36%	Yes	Leg	Allows Regulation Of Location Of sexually oriented businesses Through Zoning
88	Yes	739,270	724,097	50.52%	No	Leg	Increases Maximum Deductible In Oregon For Federal Income Taxes Paid
89	No	622,814	828,117	42.93%	No	Leg	Dedicates Tobacco Settlement Proceeds To Specified Health, Housing, Transportation Programs
90	No	158,810	1,208,545	11.61%	No	REF	Authorizes Rates Giving Utilities Return On Investments In Retired Property
91	No	661,342	814,885	44.80%	Yes	Init	Makes Federal Income Taxes Fully Deductible On Oregon Tax Returns
92	No	656,250	815,338	44.59%	Yes	Init	Prohibits Payroll Deductions For Political Purposes Without Specific Written Authorization
93	No	581,186	865,091	40.18%	Yes	Init	Voters Must Approve Most Taxes, Fees; Requires Certain Approval Percentage
94	No	387,068	1,073,275	26.51%	No	Init	Repeals Mandatory Minimum Sentences For Certain Felonies, Requires Resentencing - would have repealed 1994's Measure 11.
95	No	514,926	962,250	34.86%	Yes	Init	Student Learning Determines Teacher Pay; Qualifications, Not Seniority, Determine Retention
96	No	527,613	866,588	37.84%	Yes	Init	Prohibits Making Initiative Process Harder, Except Through Initiative; Applies Retroactively
97	No	606,939	867,219	41.17%	No	Init	Bans Body—Gripping Animal Traps, Some Poisons; Restricts Fur Commerce
98	No	678,024	776,489	46.61%	Yes	Init	Prohibits Using Public Resources For Political Purposes; Limits Payroll Deductions
99	Yes	911,217	539,414	62.82%	Yes	Init	Creates Commission Ensuring Quality Home Care Services For Elderly, Disabled
1	Yes	940,223	477,461	66.32%	Yes	Init	Legislature Must Fund School Quality Goals Adequately; Report; Establish Grants
2	No	605,575	779,190	43.73%	Yes	Init	Creates Process For Requiring Legislature To Review Administrative Rules - sought to restrict Legislature's ability to regulate land use
3	Yes	952,792	465,081	67.20%	Yes	Init	Requires Conviction Before Forfeiture; Restricts Proceeds Usage; Requires Reporting, Penalty. prohibited forfeiture without conviction.
4	No	650,850	789,543	45.19%	No	Init	Dedicates Tobacco-Settlement Proceeds; Earnings Fund Low-Income Health Care
5	Yes	921,926	569,996	61.79%	No	Init	Expands Circumstances Requiring Background Checks Before Transfer Of Firearm
6	No	586,910	838,011	41.19%	No	Init	Provides Public Funding To Candidates Who Limit Spending, Private Contributions
7	Yes	Not published		53%	Yes	Init	Requires Payment To Landowner If Government Regulation Reduces Property Value. precursor to Oregon Ballot Measure 37 (2004); restricted land use regulation, but was struck down by the Oregon Supreme Court.
8	No	608,090	789,699	43.50%	Yes	Init	Limits State Appropriations To Percentage Of State's Prior Personal Income. would have capped state spending
9	No	702,572	788,691	47.11%	No	Init	Prohibits Public School Instruction Encouraging, Promoting, Sanctioning Homosexual, Bisexual Behaviors. would have prohibited "encouragement" of homosexuality by public schools.

=== 2002 ===
==== May ====
2002 Primary Election Detailed information for 2002 Primary measures (10, 11, and 13) and official results available from the Oregon Secretary of State's office.
Meas. Num.	Passed?	Yes votes	No votes	% Yes	Const. Amd.?	Type	Ballot Title
10	Yes	608,640	177,004	77.47%	Yes	Leg	Allows Public Universities to Receive Equity in Private Companies as Compensation for Publicly Created Technology
11	Yes	589,869	190,226	75.62%	Yes	Leg	Authorizes Less Expensive General Obligation Bond financing for OHSU Medical Research and other Capital Costs
12 — Scaled-down version of Measure 13 referred by Legislature. Removed from ballot per a Marion County judge's order.
13	No	376,605	411,923	47.76%	Yes	Leg	Authorizes Using Education Fund Principal In Specified Circumstances; Transfers $220 Million to School Fund - Referred to as "rainy day fund" in media.

==== September ====
2002 Special Election Detailed information for measures and official results available from the Oregon Secretary of State's office.
Meas. Num.	Passed?	Yes votes	No votes	% Yes	Const. Amd.?	Type	Ballot Title
19	Yes	496,815	306,440	61.85%	Yes	Leg	Authorizes Using Education Stability Fund Principal in Specified Circumstances; Transfers $150 to State School Fund; Creates School Capital Matching Matching Subaccount in Stability Funding - similar to Measure 13, but transferred less money.
20	Yes	522,613	289,119	64.38%	No	Leg	Increases Cigarette Tax; Uses Revenue for Health Plan, Other Programs

==== November ====
2002 General Election Detailed information on measures and official election results available at the Secretary of State's web site.
Meas. Num.	Passed?	Yes votes	No votes	% Yes	Const. Amd.?	Type	Ballot Title
14	Yes	867,901	352,027	71.14%	Yes	Leg	Removes Historical Racial References in Obsolete Sections of Constitution, Article VII (Original), Article XVIII
15	Yes	671,640	535,638	55.63%	Yes	Leg	Authorizes State to Issue General Obligation Bonds for Seismic Rehabilitation of Public Education Buildings (Defined)
16	Yes	669,451	530,587	55.79%	Yes	Leg	Authorizes State to Issue General Obligation Bonds for Seismic Rehabilitation of Emergency Services Buildings (Defined)
17	No	341,717	910,331	27.29%	Yes	Leg	Reduces Minimum Age Requirement to Serve as State Legislator from 21 Years to 18 Years
18	No	450,444	704,116	39.01%	Yes	Leg	Allows Certain Tax Districts to Establish Permanent Property Tax Rates and Divide into Tax Zones
21	No	526,450	668,256	44.07%	Yes	Init	Revises Procedure for Filling Judicial Vacancies, Electing Judges; Allows Vote for "None of the Above"
22	No	595,936	610,063	49.41%	Yes	Init	Requires Supreme Court Judges and Court of Appeals Judges to be Elected by District
23	No	265,310	969,537	21.49%	No	Init	Creates Health Care Finance Plan for Medically Necessary Services; Creates Additional Income, Payroll Taxes - would have established universal health care in Oregon.
24	Yes	907,979	286,492	76.02%	No	Init	Allows Licensed Denturists to Install Partial Dentures; Authorizes Cooperative Dentist—Denturist Business Ventures
25	Yes	645,016	611,658	51.33%	No	Init	Increases Oregon Minimum Wage to $6.95 in 2003; Increases for Inflation in Future Years - tied it to the consumer price index.
26	Yes	921,606	301,415	75.35%	Yes	Init	Prohibits Payment, Receipts of Payment Based on the Number of Initiative, Referendum Signatures
27	No	371,851	886,806	29.54%	No	Leg	Requires Labeling of Genetically engineered Foods (as Defined) Sold or Distributed in or from Oregon. Opponents spent $5.5 million, tying an Oregon spending record.

=== 2003 ===
==== January ====
January 2003 Special Election Detailed information on Measure 28 and election results at the Oregon Secretary of State's site.
Meas. Num.	Passed?	Yes votes	No votes	% Yes	Const. Amd.?	Type	Ballot Title - and Notes
28	No	575,846	676,312	45.99%	No	Leg	Temporarily Increases Income Tax Rates - would have created a temporary (3-year) 1% income tax increase to balance state budgets.

==== September ====
September 2003 Special Election Detailed information on Measure 29 and election results at the Oregon Secretary of State's site.
Meas. Num.	Passed?	Yes votes	No votes	% Yes	Const. Amd.?	Type	Ballot Title
29	Yes	360,209	291,778	55.25%	Yes	Leg	Authorizes State of Oregon to Incur General Obligation Debt for Savings on Pension Liabilities.

=== 2004 ===
==== February ====
February 2004 Special Election Detailed information on Measure 30 and official results available from the Oregon Secretary of State.
Meas. Num.	Passed?	Yes votes	No votes	% Yes	Const. Amd.?	Type	Ballot Title
30	No	481,315	691,462	41.04%	No	REF	Enacts Temporary Personal Income Tax Surcharge; Increases, Changes Corporate, Other Taxes; Avoids Specific Budget Cuts.

==== November ====
In the fall election, Measure 36 (outlawing gay marriage) dominated public attention: 81,667 (or 4.7%) more votes were cast on Measure 36 than the average of all other measures on the ballot. Measure 37 (restricting land use regulation) was contentious before the election, and became more controversial after the fact, as state and local governments attempted to implement it.

Two other measures passed in 2004, both referred by the Legislature for the general election, and neither one drawing any opposition in the Voters' Pamphlet. Measure 31 made it possible to postpone certain elections in the event of a candidate's death, and Measure 32 changed the way revenue from mobile home taxes is handled.

2004 General Election Detailed information about the measures and official results available from the Oregon Secretary of State.
Meas. Num.	Passed?	Yes votes	No votes	% Yes	Const. Amd.?	Type	Ballot Title
31	Yes	1,122,852	588,502	65.61%	Yes	Leg	Authorizes Law Permitting Postponement of Election for Particular Public Office when Nominee for Office Dies.
32	Yes	1,048,090	661,576	61.30%	Yes	Leg	Deletes Reference to Mobile Homes from Provision Dealing with Taxes and Fees on Motor Vehicles.
33	No	764,015	1,021,814	42.78%	No	Init	Amends Medical Marijuana Act: Requires Dispensaries for Supplying Patients/Caregivers; Raises Patients' Possession Limit.
34	No	659,467	1,060,496	38.34%	No	Init	Requires Balancing Timber Production, Resource Conservation/Preservation in Managing State Forests; Specifically Addresses Two Forests.
35	No	869,054	896,857	49.21%	Yes	Init	Limits Noneconomic Damages (defined) Recoverable for Patient Injuries Caused by Healthcare Provider's Negligence or Recklessness.
36	Yes	1,028,546	787,556	56.63%	Yes	Init	Only Marriage Between One Man and One Woman is Valid or Legally Recognized as Marriage.
37	Yes	1,054,589	685,079	60.62%	No	Init	Governments Must Pay Owners, or Forgo Enforcement, When Certain Land Use Restrictions Reduce Property Value.
38	No	670,935	1,037,722	39.27%	No	Init	Abolishes SAIF; State Must Reinsure, Satisfy SAIF's Obligations; Dedicates Proceeds, Potential Surplus to Public Purposes.

=== 2006 ===
In 2006, voters considered 11 statewide ballot measures. All were placed on the ballot by initiative.

Nearly all the measures were defeated. Measures extending prescription drug pricing benefits (Measure 44) and restricting the government's power of eminent domain (39) were the only ones that passed without qualification; a campaign finance reform system (47) passed as well, but a companion measure (46) that would have provided necessary constitutional support for it failed.

Out-of-state interests spent millions of dollars supporting—and in one significant case, opposing—Oregon ballot measures. None of these big-money measures passed; in fact, Measures 39 and 44 passed without drawing any organized opposition.

==== Unsuccessful measures ====
Measures 41 and 48 aimed to restrict the amount of money the State government could raise and spend, respectively. They were both mostly funded by the Taxpayers Association of Oregon, which in turn received nearly all its funding from Illinois-based Americans for Limited Government. Opposition to these two measures was paired as well, spending $1.9 million to defeat the two measures.

Measure 42 was promoted by conservative ballot measure activist Bill Sizemore. Sizemore broke with his custom by promoting a consumer-oriented bill, which would have outlawed the use of credit data in determining insurance premiums. Opponents of the measure spent over $3.7 million (nearly all of which came from out of state), defeating the measure. Their advertising focused heavily on Sizemore's credibility. Sizemore did not run an active campaign promoting the measure. He and his longtime political ally Loren Parks were the only people to submit arguments in favor for the Voters' Guide.

Measure 45, almost entirely financed by $1.2 million from Illinois-based U.S. Term Limits, would have established strict term limits in the Oregon Legislative Assembly. Term limits had previously been in place in the late 1990s, but the prior law was declared unconstitutional by the Oregon Supreme Court. The measure failed.

Measures 46 and 47 were presented as a single package; 46 would have amended the Constitution to allow limitations on campaign financing (heavily favoring popular vote, and requiring a 75% vote for such changes in the Legislature); and 47 detailed specific limitations. Measure 47 passed, but in the absence of the kind of Constitutional support Measure 46 would have provided, it will have No effect. The campaigns both for and against this package were funded almost entirely from Oregon sources.

Measure 40 sought to require that judges of the Oregon Supreme Court be elected by district, rather than statewide.

Measure 43 sought to require parental notification in the event of certain teenage abortions. (Two measures restricting abortion were also rejected in the 1990 general election.)

==== Successful measures ====
Measure 39, described by its proponents as a natural extension of 2004's Measure 37, restricted the governments powers of eminent domain. Measure 44 extended a state prescription drug benefit, previously only available to seniors, to cover all uninsured Oregonians.

2006 General Election Detailed information on measures and official results available from the Oregon Secretary of State.
Meas. Num.	Passed?	Yes votes	No votes	% Yes	Const. Amd.?	Type	Ballot Title
39	Yes	881,820	431,844	67.13%	No	Init	Prohibits Public Body from Condemning Private Real Property if Intends to Convey to Private Party - Restrict the use of Eminent Domain
40	No	576,153	749,404	43.46%	Yes	Init	Requires Oregon Supreme Court Judges and Court of Appeals Judges to be Elected by District.
41	No	483,443	818,452	37.13%	No	Init	Allows Income Tax Deduction Equal to Federal Exemptions Deduction to Substitute for State Exemption Credit
42	No	479,935	876,075	35.39%	No	Init	Prohibits Insurance Companies from Using Credit Score or "Credit Worthiness" in Calculating Rates or Premiums.
43	No	616,876	746,606	45.24%	No	Init	Requires 48-Hour Notice to Unemancipated Minor's Parent Before Providing Abortion; Authorizes Lawsuits, Physician Discipline.
44	Yes	1,049,594	296,649	77.96%	No	Init	Allows Any Oregon Resident Without Prescription Drug Coverage to Participate in Oregon Prescription Drug Program.
45	No	555,016	788,895	41.30%	Yes	Init	Limits State Legislators: Six Years as Representative, Eight Years as Senator, Fourteen Years in Legislature.
46	No	520,342	770,251	40.32%	Yes	Init	Allows Laws Regulating Election Contributions, Expenditures Adopted by Initiative or 3/4 of Both Legislative Houses
47	Yes	694,918	615,256	53.04%	No	Init	Revises Campaign Finance Laws: Limits or Prohibits Contributions and Expenditures; Adds Disclosure, New Reporting Requirements.
48	No	379,971	923,629	29.15%	Yes	Init	Limits Biennial Percentage Increase in State Spending to Percentage Increase in State Population, Plus Inflation.

=== 2007 ===
In 2007, voters considered 2 statewide ballot measures.

November 2007 Special Election Detailed information on measures available from the Oregon Secretary of State.
Meas. Num.	Passed?	Yes votes	No votes	% Yes	Const. Amd.?	Type	Ballot Title
49	Yes	718,023	437,351	62.15%	No	Leg	Modifies Measure 37; clarifies right to build homes; limits large developments; protects farms, forest, groundwater.
50	No	472,063	686,470	40.75%	Yes	Leg	Dedicates funds to provide healthcare for children, fund tobacco prevention, through increased tobacco tax.

=== 2008 ===
==== May ====
Three measures (51, 52, and 53), all legislative referrals and all constitutional amendments, were on the May 2008 primary ballot. All three passed; the first two by wide margins, and Measure 53 by a margin so narrow that it triggered an automatic recount.

2008 Primary Election Detailed information on measures and official results available from the Oregon Secretary of State.
Meas. Num.	Passed?	Yes votes	No votes	% Yes	Const. Amd.?	Type	Ballot Title
51	Yes	744,195	249,143	74.92%	Yes	Leg	Enables crime victims to enforce existing constitutional rights in prosecutions, delinquency proceedings; authorizes implementing legislation.
52	Yes	738,092	247,738	74.87%	Yes	Leg	Enables crime victims to enforce existing constitutional rights in prosecutions, delinquency proceedings; authorizes implementing legislation.
53	Yes	489,592	489,042	50.03%	Yes	Leg	Modifies provisions governing civil forfeitures related to crimes; permits use of proceeds by law enforcement.

==== November ====
In November 2008, voters considered eight initiatives and four legislative referrals. The four referrals all passed, and the initiatives all failed.

2008 General Election Detailed information on measures and official results available from the Oregon Secretary of State.
Meas. Num.	Passed?	Yes votes	No votes	% Yes	Const. Amd.?	Type	Ballot Title
54	Yes	1,194,173	450,979	72.59%	Yes	Leg	Standardizes voting eligibility for school board elections with other state and local elections
55	Yes	1,251,478	364,993	77.42%	Yes	Leg	Changes operative date of redistricting plans; allows affected legislators to finish term in original district
56	Yes	959,118	735,500	56.60%	Yes	Leg	Provides that May and November property tax elections are decided by majority of voters voting
57	Yes	1,058,955	665,942	61.39%	No	Leg	Increases sentences for drug trafficking, theft against elderly and specified repeat property and identity theft crimes; requires addiction treatment for certain offenders.
58	No	756,903	977,696	43.64%	No	Init	Prohibits teaching public school student in language other than English for more than two years
59	No	615,894	1,084,422	36.22%	No	Init	Creates an unlimited deduction for federal income taxes on individual taxpayers' Oregon income-tax returns
60	No	673,296	1,070,682	38.61%	No	Init	Teacher "classroom performance," not seniority, determines pay raises; "most qualified" teachers retained, regardless of seniority
61	No	848,901	887,165	48.90%	No	Init	Creates mandatory minimum prison sentences for certain theft, identity theft, forgery, drug, and burglary crimes
62	No	674,428	1,035,756	39.44%	Yes	Init	Allocates 15% of lottery proceeds to public safety fund for crime prevention, investigation, prosecution
63	No	784,376	928,721	45.79%	No	Init	Exempts specified property owners from building permit requirements for improvements valued at/under 35,000 dollars
64	No	835,563	854,327	49.44%	No	Init	Penalizes person, entity for using funds collected with "public resource" (defined) for "political purpose" (defined)
65	No	553,640	1,070,580	34.09%	No	Init	Changes general election nomination processes for major/minor party, independent candidates for most partisan offices

== 2010s ==
=== 2010 ===
==== January ====
January 2010 Special Election Detailed information on measures and official results available from the Oregon Secretary of State.
Meas. Num.	Passed?	Yes votes	No votes	% Yes	Const. Amd.?	Type	Ballot Title
66	Yes	692,687	583,707	54.27%	No	REF	Raises tax on household income at and above $250,000 (and $125,000 for individual filers). Reduces income taxes on unemployment benefits in 2009. Provides funds currently budgeted for education, health care, public safety, other services.
67	Yes	682,720	591,188	53.59%	No	REF	Raises $10 corporate minimum tax, business minimum tax, corporate profits tax. Provides funds currently budgeted for education, health care, public safety, other services.

==== May ====
2010 Primary Election Detailed information on measures and official results available from the Oregon Secretary of State.
Meas. Num.	Passed?	Yes votes	No votes	% Yes	Const. Amd.?	Type	Ballot Title
68	Yes	498,073	267,052	65.10%	Yes	Leg	Allows state to issue bonds to match voter approved school district bonds for school capital costs.
69	Yes	546,649	216,157	71.66%	Yes	Leg	Continues and modernizes authority for lowest cost borrowing for community colleges and public universities.

==== November ====
2010 General Election Detailed information on measures and official results available from the Oregon Secretary of State.
Meas. Num.	Passed?	Yes votes	No votes	% Yes	Const. Amd.?	Type	Ballot Title
70	Yes	1,180,933	217,679	84.44%	Yes	Leg	Expands availability of home ownership loans for Oregon veterans through Oregon War Veterans' Fund.
71	Yes	919,040	435,776	67.84%	Yes	Leg	Requires legislature to meet annually; limits length of legislative sessions; provides exceptions.
72	Yes	774,582	536,204	59.09%	Yes	Leg	Authorizes exception to $50,000 state borrowing limit for state's real and personal property projects.
73	Yes	802,388	608,317	56.88%	No	Init	Requires increased minimum sentences for certain repeated sex crimes, incarceration for repeated driving under influence.
74	No	627,016	791,186	44.21%	No	Init	Establishes medical marijuana supply system and assistance and research programs; allows limited selling of marijuana.
75	No	448,162	959,342	31.84%	No	Init	Authorizes Multnomah County casino; casino to contribute monthly revenue percentage to state for specified purposes.
76	Yes	972,825	583,707	69.22%	Yes	Init	Continues lottery funding for parks, beaches, wildlife habitat, watershed protection beyond 2014; modifies funding process.

=== 2012 ===
==== November ====
2012 General Election Detailed information on measures and official results available from the Oregon Secretary of State.
Meas. Num.	Passed?	Yes votes	No votes	% Yes	Const. Amd.?	Type	Ballot Title
77	Yes	957,646	673,468	58.71%	Yes	Leg	Governor may declare "catastrophic disaster" (defined); requires legislative session; authorizes suspending specified constitutional spending restrictions.
78	Yes	1,165,963	458,509	71.77%	Yes	Leg	Changes constitutional language describing governmental system of separation of powers; makes grammatical and spelling changes.
79	Yes	976,587	679,710	58.96%	Yes	Init	Prohibits real estate transfer taxes, fees, other assessments, except those operative on December 31, 2009.
80	No	810,538	923,071	46.75%	No	Init	Allows personal marijuana, hemp cultivation/use without license; commission to regulate commercial marijuana cultivation/sale.
81	No	567,996	1,072,614	34.62%	No	Init	Prohibits commercial non-tribal fishing with gillnets in Oregon "inland waters," allows use of seine nets.
82	No	485,240	1,226,331	28.35%	Yes	Init	Authorizes establishment of privately owned casinos; mandates percentage of revenues payable to dedicated state fund.
83	No	500,123	1,207,508	29.29%	No	Init	Authorizes privately owned Wood Village casino; mandates percentage of revenues payable to dedicated state fund.
84	No	776,143	912,541	45.96%	No	Init	Phases out existing inheritance taxes on large estates, and all taxes on intra-family property transfers.
85	Yes	1,007,112	672,586	59.96%	Yes	Init	Allocates corporate income/excise tax "kicker" refund to additionally fund K through 12 public education.

=== 2014 ===
==== November ====
2014 General Election
Meas. Num.	Passed?	Yes votes	No votes	% Yes	Const. Amd.?	Type	Ballot Title
86	No	614,439	821,596	42.79%	Yes	LRCA	Amends Constitution: Requires creation of fund for Oregonians pursuing post-secondary education, authorizes state indebtedness to finance fund
87	Yes	817,709	600,015	57.68%	Yes	LRCA	Amends Constitution: Permits employment of state judges by National Guard (military service) and state public universities (teaching)
88	No	506,751	983,576	34.00%	No	VR	Provides Oregon resident "driver card" without requiring proof of legal presence in the United States
89	Yes	925,892	514,907	64.26%	Yes	CICA	Amends Constitution: State/political subdivision shall not deny or abridge equality of rights on account of sex
90	No	459,629	987,050	31.77%	No	CISS	Changes general election nomination processes: provides for single primary ballot listing candidates; top two advance
91	Yes	847,865	663,346	56.11%	No	CISS	Allows possession, manufacture, sale of marijuana by/to adults, subject to state licensing, regulation, taxation
92	No	752,737	753,574	49.97%	No	CISS	Requires food manufacturers, retailers to label "genetically engineered" foods as such; state, citizens may enforce

=== 2016 ===
==== November ====
2016 General Election
Meas. Num.	Passed?	Yes votes	No votes	% Yes	Const. Amd.?	Type	Ballot Title
94	No	699,689	1,194,167	36.95%	Yes	LRCA	Amends Constitution: Eliminates mandatory retirement age for state judges
95	Yes	1,301,183	546,919	70.41%	Yes	LRCA	Amends Constitution: Allows investments in equities by public universities to reduce financial risk and increase investments to benefit students
96	Yes	1,611,367	312,526	83.76%	Yes	LRCA	Amends Constitution: Dedicates 1.5% of state lottery net proceeds to funding support services for Oregon veterans
97	No	808,310	1,164,658	40.97%	No	CISS	Increases corporate minimum tax when sales exceed $25 million; funds education, healthcare, senior services
98	Yes	1,260,163	650,347	65.96%	No	CISS	Requires state funding for dropout-prevention, career and college readiness programs in Oregon high schools
99	Yes	1,287,095	630,735	67.11%	No	CISS	Creates "Outdoor School Education Fund," continuously funded through Lottery, to provide outdoor school programs statewide
100	Yes	1,306,213	574,631	69.45%	No	CISS	Prohibits purchase or sale of parts or products from certain wildlife species; exceptions; civil penalties

=== 2018 ===
==== January ====
January 2018 Special Election
Meas. Num.	Passed?	Yes votes	No votes	% Yes	Const. Amd.?	Type	Ballot Title
101	Yes	657,117	408,387	61.68%	No	VR	Approves temporary assessments to fund health care for low-income individuals and families, and to stabilize health insurance premiums. Temporary assessments on insurance companies, some hospitals, and other providers of insurance or health care coverage. Insurers may not increase rates on health insurance premiums by more than 1.5 percent as a result of these assessments

==== November ====
2018 General Election
Meas. Num.	Passed?	Yes votes	No votes	% Yes	Const. Amd.?	Type	Ballot Title
102	Yes	1,037,922	786,225	56.90%	Yes	LRCA	Amends Constitution: Allows local bonds for financing affordable housing with nongovernmental entities. Requires voter approval, annual audits
103	No	791,687	1,062,752	42.69%	Yes	CICA	Amends Constitution: Prohibits taxes/fees based on transactions for "groceries" (defined) enacted or amended after September 2017
104	No	631,211	1,182,023	34.81%	Yes	CICA	Amends Constitution: Expands (beyond taxes) application of requirement that three-fifths legislative majority approve bills raising revenue
105	No	675,389	1,172,774	36.54%	No	CISS	Repeals law limiting use of state/local law enforcement resources to enforce federal immigration laws
106	No	658,793	1,195,718	35.52%	Yes	CICA	Amends Constitution: Prohibits spending "public funds" (defined) directly/indirectly for "abortion" (defined); exceptions; reduces abortion access

== 2020s ==
=== 2020 ===
2020 General Election
Meas. Num.	Passed?	Yes votes	No votes	% Yes	Const. Amd.?	Type	Ballot Title
107	Yes	1,763,276	488,413	78.31%	Yes	Leg	Oregon Campaign Finance Limits Amendment
108	Yes	1,535,866	779,311	66.34%	No	Leg	Tobacco and E-Cigarette Tax Increase for Health Programs Measure
109	Yes	1,270,057	1,008,119	55.75%	No	Init	Psilocybin Program Initiative
110	Yes	1,333,268	947,313	58.46%	No	Init	Drug Decriminalization and Addiction Treatment Initiative

=== 2022 ===
2022 General Election
Meas. Num.	Passed?	Yes votes	No votes	% Yes	Const. Amd.?	Type	Ballot Title
111	Yes	951,446	924,231	50.73%	Yes	Leg	Right to Healthcare Amendment
112	Yes	1,047,028	836,295	55.59%	Yes	Leg	Remove Slavery as Punishment for Crime from Constitution Amendment
113	Yes	1,292,127	599,204	68.32%	Yes	Init	Exclusion from Re-election for Legislative Absenteeism Initiative
114	Yes	975,862	950,891	50.65%	No	Init	Changes to Firearm Ownership and Purchase Requirements Initiative

=== 2024 ===
2024 General Election
Meas. Num.	Passed?	Yes votes	No votes	% Yes	Const. Amd.?	Type	Ballot Title
115	Yes	1,340,837	747,543	64.20%	Yes	Leg	Impeachment of Elected State Executives Amendment
116	No	981,715	1,083,451	47.54%	Yes	Leg	Independent Public Service Compensation Commission Amendment
117	No	893,668	1,219,013	42.30%	No	Leg	Ranked-Choice Voting for Federal and State Elections Measure
118	No	477,516	1,641,682	22.53%	No	Init	Corporate Tax Revenue Rebate for Residents Initiative
119	Yes	1,166,425	889,265	56.74%	No	Init	Unionization of Cannabis Workers Initiative

=== 2026 ===
2026 Primary Election
Meas. Num.	Passed?	Yes votes	No votes	% Yes	Const. Amd.?	Type	Ballot Title
120	No	207,066	1,012,663	16.98%	No	Ref	Increases fuel taxes, registration/title fees for roads, tax on wages for public transportation services

== See also ==
- List of California ballot propositions
- List of Washington initiatives
- Lists of Oregon-related topics
- Government of Oregon
