= 2002 Oregon Ballot Measure 23 =

Failed ballot initiative to establish single-payer healthcare

Measure 23 (2002) was a legislatively referred state statute that would have created a single-payer health care system to provide health care to every person in the U.S. state of Oregon. The proposal would have merged all the various funding streams—personal and employer taxes, federal health programs, and the state workers' compensation system—into a single financing system. The system would have covered 100% of medically necessary health care costs with no deductibles or cost sharing. Prescription drugs, preventive care, mental health services, long-term care, dental and vision care, and many alternative therapies would have been covered as well.

The measure was rejected by voters in the general election on November 5, 2002.

== Results ==
Results by county: No: 60–70%; 70–80%; 80–90%

Measure 23 (2002)
| Choice | Votes | % |
|---|---|---|
| For | 265,310 | 21.49 |
| Against | 969,537 | 78.51 |
| Total | 1,234,847 | 100.00 |
| Registered voters/turnout | 1,872,615 | 69.1 |
Source: Oregon State Elections Division:

== See also ==
- Oregon Health Plan
- Oregon Ballot Measure 50 (2007)
- Health care reform in the United States
- List of Oregon ballot measures
