= 1996 Oregon Ballot Measure 40 and subsequent measures =

Referendums on the judice system

Ballot Measure 40 was an Oregon ballot measure in 1996. The measure brought sweeping reforms to Oregon's justice system, generally in an effort to promote victims' rights.

Measure 40 passed with 58.8% of the vote, but was overturned by the Oregon Supreme Court in 1998, on the grounds that it contained more than one amendment to the Oregon Constitution.

Measure 40 case precedent has since been cited as the basis for overturning several voter-approved initiatives. Among these are term limits for state office-holders in 2002 and Measure 3, the Oregon Property Protection Act of 2000.

Kevin Mannix, the state legislator behind Measure 40, shepherded many of its provisions through the legislature as statutory enactments (in Senate Bill 936 of 1997) while Measure 40 was being considered in the courts, placing many of the constitutional provisions of Measure 40 into statutory law.

== Armatta v. Kitzhaber ==
The 1998 Oregon Supreme Court ruling Armatta v. Kitzhaber was a landmark decision for constitutional amendments. A similar decision in California, Jones, had recently upheld the "single subject rule," which essentially states that a single constitutional amendment measure cannot affect more than one subject in the Constitution.

But the Oregon decision went further, stating that a constitutional amendment cannot affect more than a single clause of the Constitution, even if multiple clauses affect the same subject. The decision has had a significant impact on the way initiative drafters have approached their work in the years since.

== Subsequent related measures ==
Mannix subsequently brought seven more measures (Measures 69-75) to voters in 1999 via legislative referral, each originally part of Measure 40. All seven would have amended the Oregon Constitution. Four of the measures were approved by voters. Campaigns for these measures were primarily funded by conservative millionaires Loren Parks and Mark Hemstreet.

Meas num	passed?	Yes	No	%	Ballot Title
69	YES	406393	292419	58.15	Grants Victims Constitutional Rights In Criminal Prosecutions, Juvenile Court Delinquency Proceedings
70	NO	289783	407429	41.56	Gives Public, Through Prosecutor, Right To Demand Jury Trial In Criminal Cases
71	YES	404404	292696	58.01	Limits Pretrial Release Of Accused Person To Protect Victims, Public
72	NO	316351	382685	45.26	Allows Murder Conviction By 11 To 1 Jury Verdict
73	NO	320160	369843	46.4	Limits Immunity From Criminal Prosecution Of Person Ordered To Testify About His Or Her Conduct
74	YES	368899	325078	53.16	Requires Terms Of Imprisonment Announced In Court Be Fully Served, With Exceptions
75	YES	399671	292445	57.75	Persons Convicted Of Certain Crimes Cannot Serve On Grand Juries, Criminal Trial Juries

== See also ==
- Oregon Ballot Measure 11 (1994)
- List of Oregon ballot measures
