= 1996 Oregon Ballot Measure 44 =

Referendum on tobacco taxes

Oregon Ballot Measure 44 was brought to the November 1996 general election in the U.S. state of Oregon by the initiative process. It passed with 55.9% of the vote. With strong backing from Governor John Kitzhaber, PeaceHealth, a hospital in Eugene, teamed with the Oregon Association of Hospital and Health Systems (OAHHS) to bring about the initiative. Measure 44 would raise tobacco taxes in the state. The primary purpose for raising tobacco taxes was to raise money to fund the Oregon Health Plan (OHP). Additionally, some of the money from the tobacco tax would go towards programs to prevent tobacco use and educate people about the harmful effects of tobacco, primarily aimed at children. Measure 44 became highly politicized on both sides.

Prior to Measure 44 being brought to the ballot, there was a permanent and a temporary cigarette tax in Oregon. The temporary tax added 10 cents per pack of cigarettes; that money went to the Oregon Health Plan, but the temporary tax was set to expire on December 31, 1997. Measure 44 would replace this temporary tax with the permanent cigarette tax, raising it from 1.4 cents per cigarette to 2.9 cents per cigarette, making tobacco products 65% of the wholesale price up from 35%. Measure 44 would take Oregon from being ranked 17th highest in the nation for cigarette taxes to 3rd.

Roughly 90% of the revenue from the proposed cigarette tax would be allocated to fund the OHP, and 10% would go towards creating a program to educate children about the harms of tobacco and to prevent tobacco use. The OHP is a Medicaid reform that extended care to the working poor in Oregon by prioritizing and rationing health care. The OHP was championed by Governor Kitzhaber and began implementation in 1994.

Battles between those who were for Measure 44 and those who were against it quickly rose. Some of the most prominent groups and individuals who were for Measure 44 included Governor Kitzhaber, OAHHS, Senator Ron Wyden, and various other health groups. There were a few common reasons that these groups and people were for Measure 44. One of the most common reasons was that Measure 44 would expand the OHP, in a move towards universal health care in Oregon, and with that expansion, health costs would be lowered as well. Another common argument is that those who use tobacco have much greater health care costs than those who don't; thus, it is only fair to have them pay into the healthcare system. Additionally, many proponents have cited the creation of the program to educate and prevent children from smoking as a significant benefit of Measure 44.

The most prominent group against Measure 44 was the Fairness Matters to Oregon Committee, and up until a few weeks before the election, it looked as though other people and groups that were against Measure 44 included former Governor Vit Atiyeh, convenience store owners, and various other individuals. One argument of those who were against Measure 44 was that it unfairly taxed a small portion of the population in order to pay for a service that benefits a majority. Another argument was that taxing tobacco products was an unsteady way of funding the OHP and that local governments would receive less money because of the tax. A final criticism of Measure 44 was that it was irresponsible spending on the part of the Oregon legislature because they had recently increased how much they compensated hospitals and doctors instead of extending the OHP to more people.

Anti-measure 44 ads began to flow heavily in the months leading up to the general election, and were fairly successful for some time. In August 1996 a poll was done that showed that 70% of Oregonians were in favor of Measure 44. Around this time the anti-measure 44 ads began, and a month later another poll was done to measure the percent of Oregonians who were for and against the measure, which indicated that it had dropped 20% in approval to 50% of Oregonians for the measure. But the tides changed on October 29, 1996, when the Federal Communications Commission (FCC) responded to a complaint filed regarding who was truly behind the anti-measure 44 ads. The FCC ruled that the tobacco industry would have to identify themselves as the backers of the campaign against Measure 44 in radio and television ads. Additionally, it became clear that the primary organization against Measure 44, the Fairness Matters to Oregon Committee, was funded almost primarily by the tobacco industry. Also, it came out that former Governor Vic Atiyeh received roughly $5,000 from tobacco companies to speak out in favor of Measure 44.

A few weeks after the FCC ruling, the ballots were counted, and the outcome of Measure 44 was that it passed. Measure 44 passed with 55.9% of the votes. 759,048 people voted yes, and 598,543 voted no. With the passage of Measure 44, Oregon became the fourth state to pass a tobacco tax through an initiative.

Results by county: Yes: 50–60%; 60–70%; No: 50–60%; 60–70%

== See also ==
- Controlled substances in Oregon
- List of Oregon ballot measures
