= 2006 Oregon Ballot Measure 43 =

Measure 43
- Requires 48-hour notice to unemancipated minor's parents before providing abortion; authorizes lawsuits, physician discipline.

Results
Choice	Votes	%
Yes	616,876	45.24%
No	746,606	54.76%
Valid votes	1,363,482	97.42%
Invalid or blank votes	36,168	2.58%
Total votes	1,399,650	100.00%
Registered voters/turnout		68.98%
- Results by county

Oregon Ballot Measure 43 was an initiated state statute ballot measure on the November 7, 2006 general election ballot. The measure would have required that when an unemancipated minor 15 years and older sought an abortion, the medical provider must first give written notice to a parent of the minor, by certified mail, at least 48 hours prior to providing the abortion. It was rejected by voters, with only 45 percent favoring it.

== Background ==
Current Oregon law provides that a minor 15 years or older may consent to and obtain medical treatment, including abortion, without parent notification, but also that a physician may notify parent without the minor's consent. Minors 14 years or younger on the other hand must obtain parental consent before obtaining treatment. If Measure 43 had passed, it would have required that a provider notify an unemancipated minor's parent 48 hours before performing abortion. Notification meant written notice to parent by certified mail at the parent's residence. Exceptions to notice requirement for documented would be allowed for medical emergencies. This exception did not include cases of rape or incest. Unemancipated minor could apply for administrative hearing requesting abortion without notice to parent. The hearing would be confidential, open only to minor, counsel, witnesses, judge. Under the measure failure to notify parent would subject provider to civil liability to parent. In addition physicians would face administrative sanctions, license suspension, or revocation.

== Description of the Measure ==
Ballot Measure 43 required that when an unemancipated minor 15 years and older seeks an abortion, the medical provider must first give written notice to a parent of the minor, by certified mail, at least 48 hours prior to providing the abortion.

Ballot Measure 43 allowed for an exception to the notice requirement 1) if the parent or guardian is given notice in person, or 2) in the event of a medical emergency which is documented in the minor's medical file, or 3) if the minor obtains authorization from the Department of Human Services or a court.

A hearing on a request by the unemancipated minor 15 years and older would be confidential and may be attended only by the minor, counsel for the minor, witnesses and the administrative law judge. The measure also provided for expedited judicial review by a trial court of an order denying the application considered at the hearing.

Consequence for failure to notify a parent as required by the measure would have subjected the medical provider performing an abortion on an unemancipated minor 15 years and older to 1) civil liability to the parent of the minor and 2) may subject a medical provider to suspension, revocation or denial of license by the Board of Medical Examiners for the State of Oregon.

== Path to the ballot ==
=== Supporters ===
A group called the Keep Our Daughters Safe committee was responsible for getting the measure on the ballot. The Keep Our Daughters Safe petition committee was largely funded by Oregon Right to Life, which contributed nearly all of the $350,000 raised to get the measure on the ballot. Once on the ballot, a coalition of group and front committees supported Measure 43.

The Keep Our Daughters Safe ballot committee contributed the most, raising just over $1 million. The committee was largely bankrolled by Oregon Right to Life, which contributed $826,379, or 80% of the total it raised. The Oregon Right to Life Issues PAC raised $1,864 in unitemized contributions.

The Oregon Family Council, which describes itself as working "towards encouraging and equipping the Christian community to take an active role in society through the elections and legislative process,"13 contributed $95,367 to Keep Our Daughters Safe. The separate ballot question committee set up by the Oregon Family Council — the Oregon Family Council Issues PAC — raised $53,241. The Oregon Family Council contributed $12,000 to the PAC, while $34,531 came from donations under the Oregon reporting threshold.

=== Opponents ===
The No on 43 Committee led the opposition to the measure and was largely supported by Planned Parenthood affiliates, which gave $846,889, or 52 percent of the money raised by the committee. Large contributors to the No on 43 committee included NARAL Pro-Choice America affiliates, which gave $137,748; ACLU affiliates, which gave $116,732; and the campaign committee of then Oregon Gov. Ted Kulongoski contributed $45,000.

The political action committee of the Oregon Nurses Association — the Nurses United PAC, which was also active on five other ballot measures — raised $294,852. Unitemized contributions made up more than 99 percent of the committee's total.

== Election results ==
During the November 7, 2006 general election, Measure 48 was defeated, garnering 616,876 votes in favor and 746,606 opposed.

== See also ==
- List of Oregon ballot measures
