= 1997 Oregon Ballot Measure 49 =

Ballot measure dealing with prison inmates

Ballot Measure 49 was a 1997 ballot measure in the U.S. state of Oregon that restricted the kind of lawsuits that could be brought by prison inmates, and allowed the interstate shipment of products made with prison labor.

The measure, referred by the Oregon Legislative Assembly, was an amendment to the Oregon Constitution. It passed with 699,813 votes in favor and 70,940 against.

== See also ==
- List of Oregon ballot measures
