= 2006 Oregon Ballot Measure 44 =

Measure 44
- Allows any Oregon resident without prescription drug coverage to participate in Oregon prescription drug program.

Results
Choice	Votes	%
Yes	1,049,594	77.96%
No	296,649	22.04%
Valid votes	1,346,243	96.18%
Invalid or blank votes	53,407	3.82%
Total votes	1,399,650	100.00%
Registered voters/turnout		68.11%
- Results by county

Oregon ballot measure 44 was an initiated state statute ballot measure on the November 7, 2006 general election ballot. The Measure modified the eligibility requirements for Oregon residents to participate in the Oregon Prescription Drug Program. The program intends to make prescription drugs available to participants at the lowest possible cost through negotiated price discounts. It was passed overwhelmingly by voters, garnering 78% of the vote.

== Background ==
Oregon law authorizes the Oregon Prescription Drug Program, which is intended to reduce prescription drug costs and to make prescription drugs available to participants at the lowest possible cost. At the time the measure was passed, existing law authorized the program's administrator to negotiate price discounts, to purchase prescription drugs on behalf of participants, and to reimburse pharmacies. At the time, only Oregon residents over age 54 whose gross annual income did not exceed 185% of federal poverty guidelines and who had not had private prescription drug benefit coverage for the past 6 months were eligible to participate in the Program. Measure 44 eliminated those restrictions and expands Program eligibility to all Oregon residents who have no prescription drug coverage except Medicare Part D.

== Description of the Measure ==
Ballot Measure 44 modified the eligibility requirements then in effect for Oregon residents to participate in the Oregon Prescription Drug Program. The program intends to make prescription drugs available to participants at the lowest possible cost through negotiated price discounts.

The current program at the time limited to Oregon residents who were: a) at least 54 years old; b) earned less than 185% of the federal poverty level (then $18,130 per individual); and c) have not had private prescription drug coverage for the six months preceding application to the program.

Ballot Measure 44 expanded the Oregon Prescription Drug Program by removing those eligibility requirements so that all Oregonians without prescription drug coverage regardless of age or income may participate. Participation in the Oregon Prescription Drug Program is voluntary. Medicare Part D prescription plan enrollees would be eligible to join.

Participants receive a card to use at participating pharmacies to purchase prescription drugs at the discounted price. The measure did not call for any state funding for implementation of the measure.

== Election results ==
During the November 7, 2006 general election and Measure 48 was approved by a large margin, garnering 1,049,594 out 1,346,243 (78%) votes on this ballot line. There was no organized opposition to the measure, and no arguments in opposition were filed for inclusion in the voters' pamphlet.

== See also ==
- List of Oregon ballot measures
