= 1940 Oregon Ballot Measure 7 =

Oregon Ballot Measure 7 (1940) was an initiative proposed for the general election on the November 5, 1940, ballot to repeal the present liquor law, and allow private sales, with regulation and tax. The official ballot title states its intention as "BILL REPEALING PRESENT LIQUOR LAW; AUTHORIZING PRIVATE SALE, LICENSED, TAXED." It was defeated with 309,183 no votes, to only 90,681 votes in favor. After the repeal of prohibition by the Twenty-first Amendment to the United States Constitution on December 5, 1933, the Oregon Liquor Control Commission (OLCC) was established to regulate and control the sales and consumption of alcoholic liquor in Oregon. At the time, the law stated that: "only the liquor control commission can import, purchase and sell alcoholic liquor containing over seventeen percent of alcohol, and that such liquor may not be consumed on the premises". The ballot measure attempted to ratify the OLCC's dominance of liquor and "permit liquor being consumed both on and off the premises where sold, depending on vendor's license." The commission, according to the proposed bill, was to issue numerous classes of wholesale and retail liquor licenses, while "levying privileges of sales taxes on the various classes of liquor business".

Measure 7 details the licenses that would be created, vendor qualifications, fees, enforcement and violations, and reserves all this to the pre-existing Oregon Liquor Control Commission. A similar ballot measure, Measure 6, was proposed as a referendum and companion measure and was entitled "BILL TO FURTHER REGULATE SALE AND USE OF ALCOHOLIC LIQUOR." This measure was also defeated, but with a closer margin of 158,004 votes in favor and 235,128 votes in opposition.

== See also ==
- Alcoholic beverages in Oregon
- List of Oregon ballot measures
