= 2020 Oregon Ballot Measure 107 =

Ballot Measure 107
- Amend Campaign Finance: Allows laws limiting political campaign contributions and expenditures, requiring disclosure of political campaign contributions and expenditures, and requiring political campaign advertisements to identify who paid for them

Results
Choice	Votes	%
Yes	1,763,276	78.31%
No	488,413	21.69%
Total votes	2,251,689	100.00%
- Results by county Yes: 60–70% 70–80% 80–90%

In 2020, voters in the U.S. state of Oregon passed Ballot Measure 107, allowing limits on political campaign contributions. This ballot measure overturned the 1997 Oregon Supreme Court ruling in Vannatta v. Kiesling that the Oregon Constitution’s freedom of speech protections bar the legislature from limiting campaign finance activity. However, the text of the amendment states that only campaign contribution limit laws and ordinances adopted on or after January 1, 2016 will be considered constitutional, so limits enacted prior to that date (Measure 47 for instance, which was enacted in 2012), remain unenforceable unless re-enacted. As of 2023, this is the most recent statewide ballot measure in Oregon to win support from all 36 counties, as well as the last one to win majority support in Lake County.

Results by county:

County	Yes	Votes	No	Votes	Total
Baker	66.72	6,296	33.28	3,140	9,436
Benton	82.65	41,708	17.35	8,757	50,465
Clackamas	76.58	186,265	23.42	56,968	243,233
Clatsop	79.18	17,983	20.82	4,735	22,718
Columbia	74.42	22,735	25.58	7,816	30,551
Coos	71.92	25,167	28.08	9,788	34,995
Crook	66.63	9,859	33.37	4,937	14,796
Curry	75.17	10,655	24.83	3,519	14,174
Deschutes	78.93	94,215	21.07	25,146	119,361
Douglas	68.24	41,640	31.76	19,377	61,017
Gilliam	68.87	781	31.13	353	1,134
Grant	66.02	2,889	33.98	1,487	4,376
Harney	63.51	2,691	36.49	1,546	4,237
Hood River	82.46	10,288	17.54	2,188	12,476
Jackson	72.33	87,500	27.67	33,467	120,967
Jefferson	70.53	8,021	29.47	3,351	11,372
Josephine	74.34	36,253	25.66	12,516	48,769
Klamath	67.85	23,444	32.15	11,107	34,551
Lake	60.24	2,477	39.76	1,635	4,112
Lane	80.19	168,600	19.81	41,640	210,240
Lincoln	80.68	23,637	19.32	5,662	29,299
Linn	70.59	48,694	29.41	20,287	68,981
Malheur	67.02	7,494	32.98	3,687	11,181
Marion	74.24	117,214	25.26	39,610	156,824
Morrow	67.02	3,267	32.98	1,608	4,875
Multnomah	86.67	384,824	13.33	59,163	443,987
Polk	73.35	33,894	26.65	12,312	46,206
Sherman	60.52	693	39.48	452	1,145
Tillamook	76.37	12,271	23.63	3,796	16,067
Umatilla	70.99	21,800	29.01	8,907	30,707
Union	68.74	9,683	31.26	4,403	14,086
Wallowa	69.41	3,427	30.59	1,510	4,937
Wasco	76.11	10,226	23.89	3,209	13,435
Washington	81.29	245,143	18.71	56,426	301,569
Wheeler	63.61	577	26.39	330	907
Yamhill	75.11	40,965	24.89	13,578	54,543

== See also ==
- List of Oregon ballot measures
