= 2007 Oregon Ballot Measure 50 =

Measure 50
- Amends Constitution: Dedicates funds to provide health care for children, fund tobacco prevention, through increased tobacco tax.

Results
Choice	Votes	%
Yes	472,063	40.75%
No	686,470	59.25%
Valid votes	1,158,533	99.60%
Invalid or blank votes	4,677	0.40%
Total votes	1,163,210	100.00%
Registered voters/turnout		60.02%
County results
For
50–60%
Against
80–90%
70–80%
60–70%
50–60%

Ballot Measure 50 was a legislatively referred state statute ballot measure for the November 6, 2007 special election ballot in the state of Oregon. This measure would have increased the tobacco tax and dedicated the new revenue to providing health care for children, low-income adults and other medically underserved Oregonians, and to fund tobacco prevention and education programs. The proposal would have increased the tax on cigarettes by 84.5 cents per pack, and increased the tax on other tobacco products.

The purpose of the fund would have been to finance the Healthy Kids Program created by the 2007 legislature to provide affordable health care for uninsured children. The measure would have funded tobacco prevention programs, safety net clinics, rural health care and health care for Oregon’s lowest income families and individuals through the Oregon Health Plan. The campaigns for and against the measure spent the most money ever on a ballot measure election in the state's history. Because the measure did not pass, these health care programs were not expanded, and the Healthy Kids Program did not become law.

== See also ==
- Blanket primary
- 2007 Oregon's statewide elections
- List of Oregon ballot measures
