= Oregon Ballot Measure 1 (1908) =

Oregon Ballot Measure 1 (1908) Ballot measure 1 was a proposed constitutional amendment through the referendum process of Oregon, USA. The amendment would have amended Section 28, Article IV, of the Constitution of the State of Oregon. This measure, if passed, would have increased compensation for legislators from $120 to $400 per session. The measure was struck down by a popular vote of 68,892 to 19,691 on June 1, 1908.

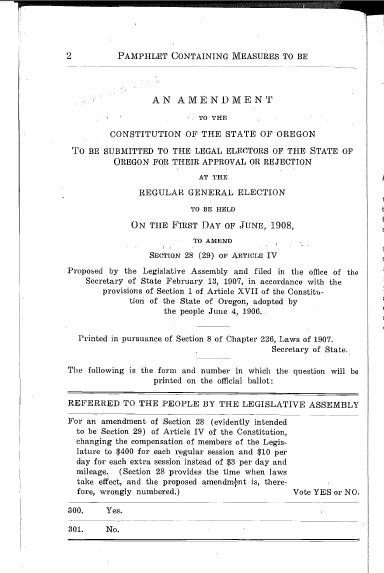
Oregon Ballot Measure 1 (1908) as shown on the 1908 voter pamphlet
