= Measure 36 =

There are several ballot measures called Measure 36:

- Oregon Ballot Measure 36 (1996) (minimum wage)
- Oregon Ballot Measure 36 (2004) (constitutional amendment to ban same sex marriage)
