= 2002 Oregon Ballot Measure 25 =

Ballot initiative to raise the minimum wage

Ballot Measure 25 of 2002 increased Oregon's minimum wage from $6.50 to $6.90 per hour and required an annual increase to compensate for inflation in future years. Inflation is measured by the consumer price index. As of 2015, the minimum wage in Oregon is $9.25 an hour. The measure was approved in the November 5, 2002 general election with 645,016 votes in favor, 611,658 votes against.Itemized Measure Listings, Measure 25 page 17 The measure was placed on the ballot as a result of initiative petition.

== Arguments for and against ==
Proponents included labor unions, the Oregon Catholic Conference, and other advocates for the working class and the poor. They pointed out the difficulty of raising a family on the current minimum wage, and argued that tying the minimum wage to inflation was more fair. Rather than teenage workers, supporters argued that many minimum wage earners were adults supporting children.

Opponents feared that a minimum wage increase would prolong the recession Oregon was experiencing at the time, pointed out that Oregon already had a relatively high minimum wage (compared with other U.S. states), and argued that indexing the wage to the consumer price index would unfairly punish rural communities, since the CPI is based on prices in cities.

== Detailed history ==
The measure was sponsored by future Oregon Commissioner of Labor and Industries Dan Gardner and state Representative Diane Rosenbaum.

In 2003, the Republican-controlled Oregon House of Representatives approved a bill (House Bill 2624) that would repeal the part of Measure 25 that ties the minimum wage to inflation. As of April 2003, however, observers did not expect the bill to pass the Oregon State Senate (which was then evenly split between Republicans and Democrats) or be signed by Democratic Governor Ted Kulongoski. The bill was not taken up in the Senate's 2003 session, and the Senate is now majority Democrat, suggesting it is unlikely to be taken up in the foreseeable future.

== Results ==
Ballot Measure 25
- Concerns Raising the Minimum Wage

Results
| Choice | Votes | % |
|---|---|---|
| Yes | 645,016 | 51.33% |
| No | 611,658 | 48.67% |
- County results Yes: 50–60% 60–70% No: 50–60% 60–70%

Measure 25 (2002)
| Choice | Votes | % |
|---|---|---|
| For | 645,016 | 51.33 |
| Against | 611,658 | 48.67 |
| Total | 1,256,674 | 100.00 |
| Registered voters/turnout | 1,872,615 | 69.1 |
Source: Oregon State Elections Division

== See also ==
- Oregon Ballot Measure 36 (1996)
