= 1996 Oregon Ballot Measure 36 =

Referendum on minimum wage

Ballot Measure 36 of 1996 increased the U.S. state of Oregon's minimum wage from $4.75 to $6.50 over a three-year period. The measure was approved by voters in the 5 November 1996 general election, with 769,725 votes in favor and 584,303 votes against. The measure was placed on the ballot as a result of initiative petition.

Proponents of the measure included labor unions, the Oregon State Council of Senior Citizens and some religious groups. They argued that the previous minimum wage was not a living wage, and that many minimum wage earners were trying to support families – see family wage.

Opponents included businesses that employ minimum wage earners, among others. They argued that increasing the minimum wage would increase consumer prices, and increase unemployment as employers would be able to hire fewer workers. They also pointed out that the U.S. Congress had just passed a (smaller) increase to the federal minimum wage.

In 2002, voters passed Measure 25, which again increased the minimum wage. Measure 25 also tied future minimum wage increases to inflation.

Results by county: Yes: 50–60%; 60–70%; No: 50–60%; 60–70%

== See also ==
- List of Oregon ballot measures
- Oregon Ballot Measure 25 (2002)
