= 2012 Oregon elections =

- November 6, 2012

On November 6, 2012, the U.S. state of Oregon held statewide general elections for four statewide offices (secretary of state, attorney general, treasurer, and commissioner of labor), both houses of the Oregon Legislative Assembly, and several state ballot measures.

The primary elections were held on May 15, 2012. Both elections also included national races for President of the United States and five U.S. House Representatives. Numerous local jurisdictions — cities, counties, and regional government entities — held elections for various local offices and ballot measures on these days as well.

== Federal ==
=== President of the United States ===
Democratic incumbent Barack Obama defeated his Republican opponent Mitt Romney in the national presidential election. In Oregon, the voters also chose Obama, giving him all of Oregon's 7 electoral votes.

=== United States House of Representatives ===
All five of Oregon's seats in the United States House of Representatives were up for re-election in 2012. All five incumbents ran for and won re-election, including Democrat Suzanne Bonamici who won a special election in District 1 earlier in the year to replace Democrat David Wu.

== Statewide ==
=== Attorney General ===
2012 Oregon Attorney General election
- November 6, 2012
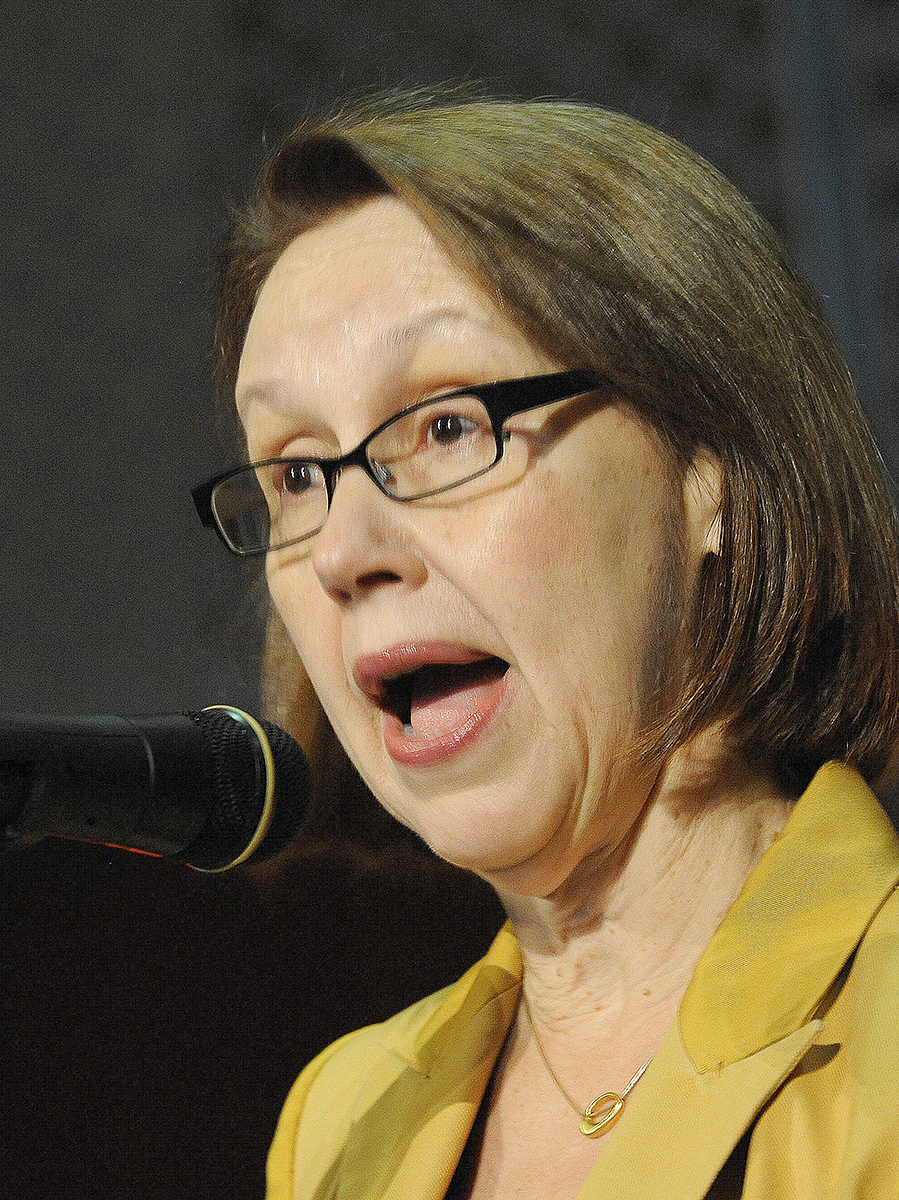

Nominee	Ellen Rosenblum	James Buchal
Party	Democratic	Republican
Popular vote	917,627	639,363
Percentage	56.17%	39.14%
- Rosenblum: 40–50% 50–60% 60–70% 70–80% Buchal: 40–50% 50–60% 60–70%
Attorney General before election
Ellen Rosenblum
Democratic
Elected Attorney General
Ellen Rosenblum
Democratic

Incumbent Oregon Attorney General John Kroger, first elected in 2008, announced in October 2011 that he would not seek a second term, citing undisclosed medical issues. In April 2012, he announced would resign his office in June to become president of Reed College. On June 29, Democrat Ellen Rosenblum was sworn in as interim attorney general. Rosenblum, a former judge on the Oregon Court of Appeals, also defeated former U.S. Attorney Dwight Holton in the Democratic primary and will compete for a full term in November against Republican attorney James Buchal, who had a successful write-in campaign in the Republican primary.

==== Democratic primary ====
===== Candidates =====
- Dwight Holton, former interim U.S. Attorney for Oregon
- Ellen Rosenblum, former Oregon Court of Appeals judge

===== Results =====
Democratic Primary results
Party	Candidate	Votes	%
Democratic	Ellen Rosenblum	202,935	64.5
Democratic	Dwight Holton	110,891	35.3
Democratic	write-ins	657	0.2
Total votes		305,545	100

==== Republican primary ====
===== Candidates =====
No Republican filed to run in the primary, but a few weeks before the primary election, party officials sent postcards to Republicans urging them to write in Portland lawyer James Buchal. Buchal qualified for the general election with more than half the more than 25,000 write-in votes cast.

===== Results =====
Republican Primary results
Party	Candidate	Votes	%
Republican	James Buchal (write-in candidate)	12,816	50.4
Republican	other write-ins	12,622	49.6
Total votes		25,438	100

==== General election ====
===== Candidates =====
- James Buchal (Republican), attorney
- Chris Henry (Progressive), truck driver
- James E. Leuenberger (Constitution, Libertarian), attorney
- Ellen Rosenblum (Democrat), interim attorney general, former Oregon Court of Appeals judge

===== Polling =====
Poll source	Date(s) administered	Sample size	Margin of error	Ellen Rosenblum (D)	James Buchal (R)	Undecided
Public Policy Polling	June 21–24, 2012	686	± 3.7%	46%	33%	20%

===== Results =====
Official Results - November 2012 General Election
Party	Candidate	Votes	%
Democratic	Ellen Rosenblum	917,627	56.17
Republican	James Buchal	639,363	39.14
Constitution	James E. Leuenberger	45,451	2.78
Progressive	Chris Henry	28,187	1.73
	write-ins	2,975	0.18
Total votes		1,633,603	100

=== Secretary of State ===
Incumbent Oregon Secretary of State Kate Brown, first elected in 2008, is seeking a second term. She defeated perennial candidate Paul Damian Wells in the Democratic primary and faces Republican orthopedic surgeon Knute Buehler in the general election. Buehler was unopposed in the Republican primary and also won the Independent Party nomination.

==== Democratic primary ====
===== Candidates =====
- Kate Brown, incumbent
- Paul Damian Wells, machinist

===== Results =====
Democratic Primary results
Party	Candidate	Votes	%
Democratic	Kate Brown	284,470	91.1
Democratic	Paul Damian Wells	26,177	8.4
Democratic	write-ins	1,510	0.5
Total votes		312,157	100

==== Republican primary ====
===== Candidates =====
- Knute Buehler, surgeon

===== Results =====
Republican Primary results
Party	Candidate	Votes	%
Republican	Knute Buehler	199,179	97.76
Republican	write-ins	4,558	2.24
Total votes		203,737	100

==== Independent Party of Oregon ====
Oregon allows candidates to be cross-nominated by up to three political parties. The Independent Party of Oregon holds a month-long online primary to select which candidate receives their nomination. The party chose candidates in a number of legislative and local races but only one statewide race, secretary of state.

===== Candidates =====
- Kate Brown, incumbent
- Knute Buehler, surgeon

===== Results =====
Independent Party of Oregon primary results
Party	Candidate	Votes	%
Republican	Knute Buehler	348	55.68
Democratic	Kate Brown	277	44.32
Total votes		625	100

==== General election ====
Results by county

===== Candidates =====
- Kate Brown (Democrat, Working Families), incumbent
- Knute Buehler (Republican, Independent), orthopedic surgeon
- Bruce Alexander Knight (Libertarian), store manager
- Robert Wolfe (Progressive), wine salesman
- Seth Woolley (Pacific Green), software engineer

===== Polling =====
Poll source	Date(s) administered	Sample size	Margin of error	Kate Brown (D)	Knute Buehler (R, I)	Undecided
The Oregonian	October 25–28, 2012	405	± 5%	38%	23%	36%
DHM Research	October 18–20, 2012	500	± 2.6%–4.4%	43%	37%	15%
Public Policy Polling	June 21–24, 2012	686	± 3.7%	48%	30%	21%

===== Results =====
Oregon Secretary of State - General Election Results
Party	Candidate	Votes	%
Democratic	Kate Brown	863,656	51.28
Republican	Knute Buehler	727,607	43.20
Pacific Green	Seth Woolley	44,235	2.63
Libertarian	Bruce Alexander Knight	24,273	1.44
Progressive	Robert Wolfe	21,783	1.29
	write-ins	2,561	0.15
Total votes		1,684,115	100

=== State Treasurer ===
Incumbent Oregon State Treasurer Ted Wheeler was appointed to the position in March 2010 following the death of Ben Westlund. Wheeler subsequently won a November 2010 special election to complete the remainder of Westlund's term. He is seeking re-election to a full term in 2012. Tom Cox, a management consultant who ran for governor as the Libertarian nominee in 2002, won the Republican nomination as a write-in candidate.

==== Democratic primary ====
===== Candidates =====
- Ted Wheeler, incumbent

===== Results =====
Democratic Primary results
Party	Candidate	Votes	%
Democratic	Ted Wheeler	272,278	99.50
Democratic	write-ins	1,365	0.50
Total votes		273,643	100

==== Republican primary ====
===== Candidates =====
No Republican filed to run in the primary, but a few weeks before the primary election, party officials sent postcards to Republicans urging them to write in Tom Cox, who won 5% of the vote as the Libertarian candidate for governor in 2002. Cox won the majority of the more than 24,000 write-in votes to advance to the November general election.

===== Results =====
Republican Primary results
Party	Candidate	Votes	%
Republican	Tom Cox (write-in)	12,885	53.2
Republican	other write-ins	11,337	46.8
Total votes		24,222	100

==== General election ====
Results by county

===== Candidates =====
- Tom Cox (Republican), management consultant
- John F. Mahler (Libertarian), retired plant engineer
- Michael Paul Marsh (Constitution), retired landscaper, custodian, and paralegal
- Ted Wheeler (Democrat, Working Families), incumbent
- Cameron Whitten (Progressive), student

===== Polling =====
Poll source	Date(s) administered	Sample size	Margin of error	Ted Wheeler (D)	Tom Cox (R)	Undecided
Public Policy Polling	June 21–24, 2012	686	± 3.7%	46%	34%	19%

===== Results =====
Oregon State Treasurer - General Election Results
Party	Candidate	Votes	%
Democratic	Ted Wheeler	955,213	57.84
Republican	Tom Cox	609,989	36.93
Progressive	Cameron Whitten	38,762	2.36
Libertarian	John Mahler	30,002	1.83
Constitution	Michael Paul Marsh	15,415	0.94
	write-ins	2,181	0.13
Total votes		1,643,350	100

=== Labor Commissioner ===
The Oregon Commissioner of Labor serves as the head of the state Bureau of Labor and Industries (BOLI), and is a nonpartisan position. Brad Avakian, a Democrat who has served as Commissioner since 2008, is running for re-election. Republican state Senator Bruce Starr is challenging Avakian.

==== General election ====
Results by county

===== Candidates =====
- Brad Avakian, incumbent
- Bruce Starr, state senator

===== Polling =====
Poll source	Date(s) administered	Sample size	Margin of error	Brad Avakian (D)	Bruce Starr (R)	Undecided
The Oregonian	October 25–28, 2012	405	± 5%	26%	20%	53%
DHM Research	October 18–20, 2012	500	± 2.6%–4.4%	22%	19%	60%
Public Policy Polling	June 21–24, 2012	686	± 3.7%	21%	23%	56%

===== Results =====
Oregon Commissioner of Labor and Industries - General Election Results
Party	Candidate	Votes	%
Democratic	Brad Avakian	681,987	52.53
Republican	Bruce Starr	606,735	46.73
	write-ins	9,616	0.74
Total votes		1,298,338	100

== Legislative ==
The Democrats had a 16–14 majority in the Oregon State Senate in the previous session. 16 of the 30 senate seats were up for election. In the Oregon House of Representatives, which was evenly split between Democrats and Republicans, all 60 seats were up for election. Democrats retained their 16–14 majority in the Senate, and took a 34–26 majority in the House.

== Ballot measures ==
Nine measures appeared on the November ballot. Two were legislative referrals, four were initiated constitutional amendments, and three were initiated state statutes.

=== Measure 77 ===
Results by county

Referred by the legislature. Amends Constitution: Governor may declare "catastrophic disaster;" requires legislative session; authorizes suspending specified constitutional spending restrictions.

Measure 77
Choice	Votes	%
For	957,646	58.71
Against	673,468	41.29
Total	1,631,114	100.00
Source: Oregon State Elections Division

=== Measure 78 ===
Results by county

Referred by the legislature. Amends Constitution: Changes constitutional language describing governmental system of separation of powers; makes grammatical and spelling changes.

Measure 78
Choice	Votes	%
For	1,165,963	71.77
Against	458,509	28.23
Total	1,624,472	100.00
Source: Oregon State Elections Division

=== Measure 79 ===
Results by county

Initiated constitutional amendment. Amends Constitution: Prohibits real estate transfer taxes, fees, other assessments, except those operative on December 31, 2009.

Measure 79
Choice	Votes	%
For	976,587	58.96
Against	679,710	41.04
Total	1,656,297	100.00
Source: Oregon State Elections Division

=== Measure 80 ===
Results by county

Initiated statute. Allows personal marijuana, hemp cultivation/use without license; commission to regulate commercial marijuana cultivation/sale.

Measure 80
Choice	Votes	%
For	810,538	46.75
Against	923,071	53.25
Total	1,733,609	100.00
Source: Oregon State Elections Division

=== Measure 81 ===
Results by county

Initiated statute. Prohibits commercial non-tribal fishing with gillnets in Oregon "inland waters," allows use of seine nets.

Measure 82
Choice	Votes	%
For	567,996	34.62
Against	1,072,614	65.38
Total	1,640,610	100.00
Source: Oregon State Elections Division

=== Measure 82 ===
Results by county

Initiated constitutional amendment. Amends Constitution: authorizes establishment of privately owned casinos; mandates percentage of revenues payable to dedicated state fund.

Measure 82
Choice	Votes	%
For	485,240	28.35
Against	1,226,331	71.65
Total	1,711,571	100.00
Source: Oregon State Elections Division

=== Measure 83 ===
Results by county

Initiated statute. Authorizes privately owned Wood Village Casino at the closed Multnomah Greyhound Park; mandates percentage of revenues payable to dedicated state fund.

Measure 83
Choice	Votes	%
For	500,123	29.29
Against	1,207,508	70.71
Total	1,707,631	100.00
Source: Oregon State Elections Division

=== Measure 84 ===
Results by county

Initiated statute. Phases out existing inheritance taxes on large estates, and all taxes on intra-family property transfers.

Measure 84
Choice	Votes	%
For	776,143	45.96
Against	912,541	54.04
Total	1,688,684	100.00
Source: Oregon State Elections Division

=== Measure 85 ===
Results by county

Initiated constitutional amendment. Amends Constitution: allocates corporate income/excise tax "kicker" refund to additionally fund K–12 public education.

Measure 85
Choice	Votes	%
For	1,007,122	59.96
Against	672,586	40.04
Total	1,679,708	100.00
Source: Oregon State Elections Division

== See also ==
- Elections in Oregon
