= 2010 Oregon elections =

- November 2, 2010

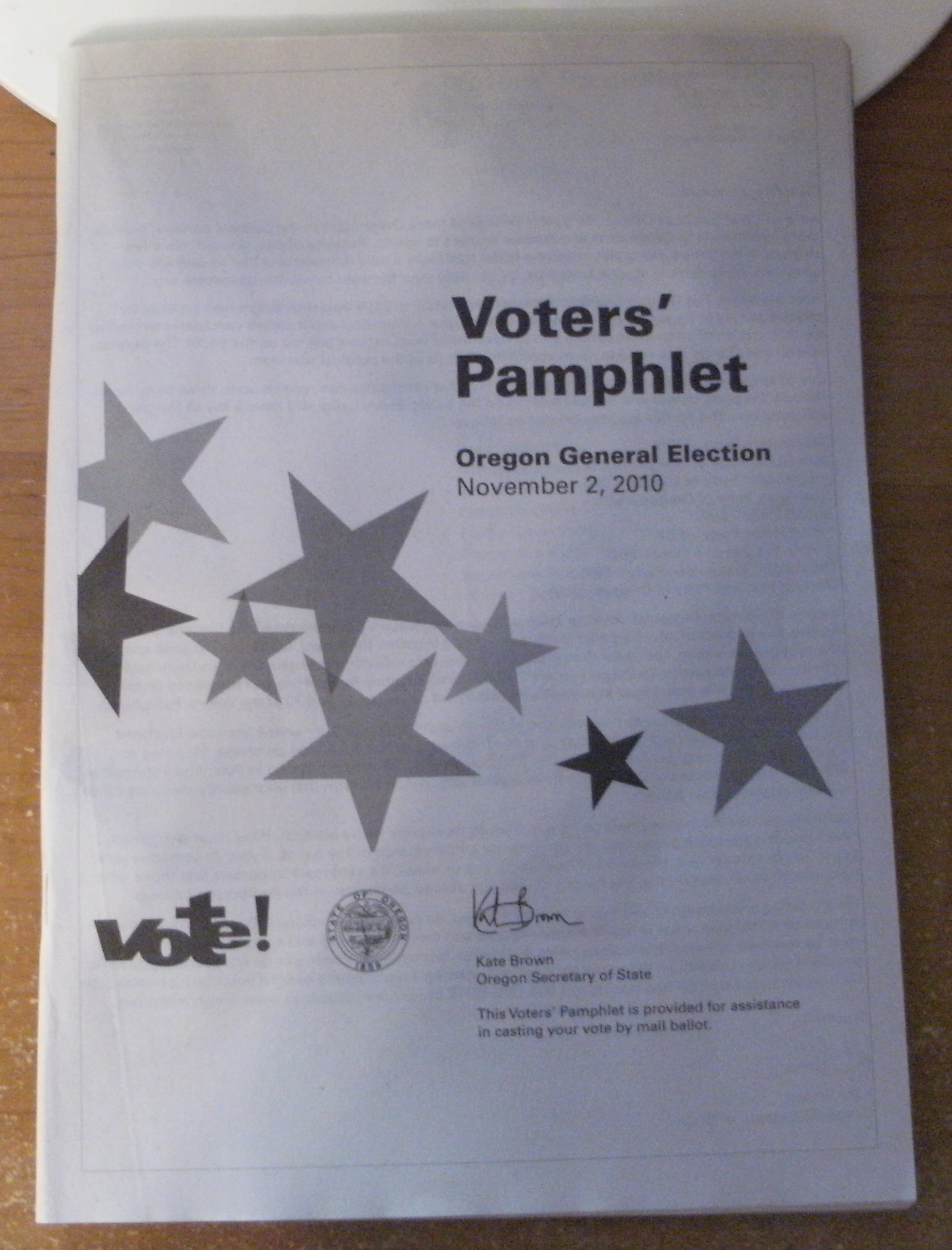
Voters' pamphlet for the 2010 general election.

General elections were held in Oregon on November 2, 2010. Primary elections took place on May 18, 2010.

== Federal ==
=== United States Senate ===
Democratic incumbent Ron Wyden ran for re-election. His Republican opponent was Jim Huffman.

=== United States House of Representatives ===
All five of Oregon's seats in the United States House of Representatives were up for re-election in 2010. All five incumbents ran for re-election, including Democrat David Wu in District 1, Republican Greg Walden in District 2, Democrat Earl Blumenauer in District 3, Democrat Peter DeFazio in District 4, and Democrat Kurt Schrader in District 5.

== State ==
=== Governor ===
Incumbent Governor Ted Kulongoski was term-limited. Former two-term governor John Kitzhaber, a Democrat, narrowly defeated the Republican nominee, former NBA player Chris Dudley.

=== Superintendent of Public Instruction ===
Results by county Castillo: 50–60%; 60–70%; Maurer: 50–60%; 60–70%; 70–80%

In May, incumbent Susan Castillo faced State Representative Ron Maurer for Superintendent of Public Instruction, a nonpartisan office. She received just over 50% of the vote, meaning that she was re-elected rather than facing a runoff in November.

==== Results ====
Superintendent of Public Instruction election, May 18, 2010
| Party | Candidate | Votes | % |
|---|---|---|---|
| Nonpartisan | Susan Castillo | 349,055 | 50.04 |
| Nonpartisan | Ron Maurer | 346,199 | 49.63 |
| Nonpartisan | Write-in | 2,243 | 0.32 |
| Total votes | | 697,497 | |

=== Treasurer ===
The 2010 elections in Oregon also included a special election for Treasurer to complete the term of Ben Westlund, who was elected in 2008 but died in office. Interim Treasurer Ted Wheeler defeated State Senator Rick Metsger in the Democratic primary, and then defeated Republican State Senator Chris Telfer, who was unopposed in the Republican primary, in November.

==== Democratic primary results ====
Oregon State Treasurer Democratic primary election, May 18, 2010
| Party | Candidate | Votes | % |
|---|---|---|---|
| Democratic | Ted Wheeler | 215,399 | 64.92 |
| Democratic | Rick Metsger | 114,114 | 34.39 |
| Democratic | write-ins | 2,263 | 0.68 |
| Total votes | | 331,776 | |

==== General election results ====
Oregon State Treasurer special election, 2010
| Party | Candidate | Votes | % |
|---|---|---|---|
| Democratic | Ted Wheeler | 729,958 | 54.03 |
| Republican | Chris Telfer | 553,791 | 40.99 |
| Progressive | Walt Brown | 36,533 | 2.70 |
| Constitution | Michael Marsh | 29,246 | 2.16 |
| | write-ins | 1,541 | 0.11 |
| Total votes | | 1,351,069 | 100 |
| Democratic hold | | | |

=== State legislature ===
Sixteen of the 30 seats in the Oregon State Senate, and all 60 seats in the Oregon House of Representatives, were up for election in 2010.

=== Judicial Offices ===
Two seats on the Oregon Supreme Court, three seats on the Oregon Court of Appeals, and many Circuit Court Judges were up for election in 2010.

- Oregon judicial elections, 2010 at Judgepedia

=== Ballot measures ===
==== January ====
Two measures, both veto referendums, appeared on the state's ballot in a January special election.

===== Measure 66 =====
Raises tax on household income at and above $250,000 (and $125,000 for individual filers). Reduces income taxes on unemployment benefits in 2009. Provides funds currently budgeted for education, health care, public safety, other services.

Measure 66
| Choice | Votes | % |
|---|---|---|
| For | 692,687 | 54.27 |
| Against | 583,707 | 45.73 |
| Total | 1,276,394 | 100.00 |
| Registered voters/turnout | 2,044,042 | 62.7 |
Source: Oregon State Elections Division

===== Measure 67 =====
Raises $10 corporate minimum tax, business minimum tax, corporate profits tax. Provides funds currently budgeted for education, health care, public safety, other services.

Measure 67
| Choice | Votes | % |
|---|---|---|
| For | 682,720 | 53.59 |
| Against | 591,188 | 46.41 |
| Total | 1,273,908 | 100.00 |
| Registered voters/turnout | 2,044,042 | 62.7 |
Source: Oregon State Elections Division

==== May ====
Two measures, both legislative referrals, appeared on the state's ballot in May 2010.

===== Measure 68 =====
Results by county

Revises constitution: Allows state to issue bonds to match voter approved school district bonds for school capital costs.

Measure 68
| Choice | Votes | % |
|---|---|---|
| For | 498,073 | 65.10 |
| Against | 267,052 | 34.90 |
| Total | 765,125 | 100.00 |
| Registered voters/turnout | 2,033,951 | 37.6 |
Source: Oregon State Elections Division

===== Measure 69 =====
Results by county

Amends constitution: continues and modernizes authority for lowest cost borrowing for community colleges and public universities.

Measure 69
| Choice | Votes | % |
|---|---|---|
| For | 546,649 | 71.66 |
| Against | 216,157 | 28.34 |
| Total | 762,806 | 100.00 |
| Registered voters/turnout | 2,033,951 | 37.5 |
Source: Oregon State Elections Division

==== November ====
Seven statewide measures appeared on the November ballot. Three were legislative referrals and four were citizen initiatives.

===== Measure 70 =====
Results by county

Amends Constitution: Expands availability of home ownership loans for Oregon veterans through Oregon War Veterans' Fund.

Measure 70
| Choice | Votes | % |
|---|---|---|
| For | 1,180,933 | 84.44 |
| Against | 217,679 | 15.56 |
| Total | 1,398,612 | 100.00 |
Source: Oregon State Elections Division

===== Measure 71 =====
Results by county

Amends Constitution: Requires legislature to meet annually; limits length of legislative sessions; provides exceptions.

Measure 71
| Choice | Votes | % |
|---|---|---|
| For | 919,040 | 67.84 |
| Against | 435,776 | 32.16 |
| Total | 1,354,816 | 100.00 |
Source: Oregon State Elections Division

===== Measure 72 =====
Results by county

Amends Constitution: Authorizes exception to $50,000 state borrowing limit for state's real and personal property projects.

Measure 72
| Choice | Votes | % |
|---|---|---|
| For | 735,439 | 58.96 |
| Against | 511,952 | 41.04 |
| Total | 1,247,391 | 100.00 |
Source: Oregon State Elections Division

===== Measure 73 =====
Results by county

Requires increased minimum sentences for certain repeated sex crimes, incarceration for repeated driving under influence.

Measure 73
| Choice | Votes | % |
|---|---|---|
| For | 765,879 | 56.95 |
| Against | 578,830 | 43.05 |
| Total | 1,344,709 | 100.00 |
Source: Oregon State Elections Division

===== Measure 74 =====
Results by county

Establishes medical marijuana supply system and assistance and research programs; allows limited selling of marijuana.

Measure 74
| Choice | Votes | % |
|---|---|---|
| For | 592,665 | 43.85 |
| Against | 758,809 | 56.15 |
| Total | 1,351,474 | 100.00 |
Source: Oregon State Elections Division

===== Measure 75 =====
Results by county

Authorizes Multnomah County casino; casino to contribute monthly revenue percentage to state for specified purposes.

Measure 75
| Choice | Votes | % |
|---|---|---|
| For | 426,667 | 31.80 |
| Against | 914,940 | 68.20 |
| Total | 1,341,607 | 100.00 |
Source: Oregon State Elections Division

===== Measure 76 =====
Results by county

Amends Constitution: Continues lottery funding for parks, beaches, wildlife habitat, watershed protection beyond 2014; modifies funding process

Measure 76
| Choice | Votes | % |
|---|---|---|
| For | 923,931 | 68.98 |
| Against | 415,396 | 31.02 |
| Total | 1,339,327 | 100.00 |
Source: Oregon State Elections Division

== See also ==
- Oregon 2010 ballot measures at Ballotpedia
