= Oregon tax revolt =

Political movement in Oregon, United States

The Oregon tax revolt is a political movement in the U.S. state of Oregon which advocates for lower taxes. This movement is part of a larger anti-tax movement in the western United States which began with the enactment of Proposition 13 in California. The tax revolt, carried out in large part by a series of citizens' initiatives and referendums, has reshaped the debate about taxes and public services in Oregon.

== Major figures ==
The leaders of the tax revolt include Don McIntire, president of the Taxpayer Association of Oregon, and Bill Sizemore, leader of Oregon Taxpayers United. Much of the money spent to promote these anti-tax measures were provided by out-of-state backers, including Americans for Tax Reform headed by Grover Norquist.

Tim Knopp, a Republican lawmaker from Bend, was the main author of the “kicker” tax rebate and the later successful effort to place it in the Oregon Constitution. He is the former House majority leader and as of 2024, Senate Minority Leader.

== National context and the passage of Measure 5 ==
Oregon voters placed limits to property tax in the Oregon Constitution in 1990 with the passage of Measure 5. A majority of voters were frustrated by the increase in property taxes attributed to rapidly rising property values in the Portland metropolitan area (Portland metro). Some attribute this home price inflation to an influx of population in the Portland metro, which is surrounded by an urban growth boundary that limits the supply of developable land.

Measure 5 shifted the source of school funding to the state. Instead of property taxes, funding had to come from the General Fund. Oregon does not have a sales tax, so money had to be drawn from the General Fund, primarily via the state income tax.

Measure 5 also equalized school funding throughout the state, which meant that schools in rural areas benefited while schools in Portland saw budgets reduced.

== Measure 47 ==
Measure 47 attempted to cap the annual rate at which property taxes could rise. This was partly to moderate fast growing house prices in Portland. Measure 47 also instituted Oregon's double majority rule, in which local tax levies could only pass in minor elections when voter turnout surpassed half of the registered voters. In November 1996, Measure 47 was passed by the Oregon voters 52.3% to 47.7%. Problems with the legal wording of Measure 47 caused the Oregon Legislature to send Measure 50 to voters in 1997, which clarified Measure 47. During a special election in May 1997, Measure 50 was approved by the voters 55.7% to 44.3%.

== Later legislation ==
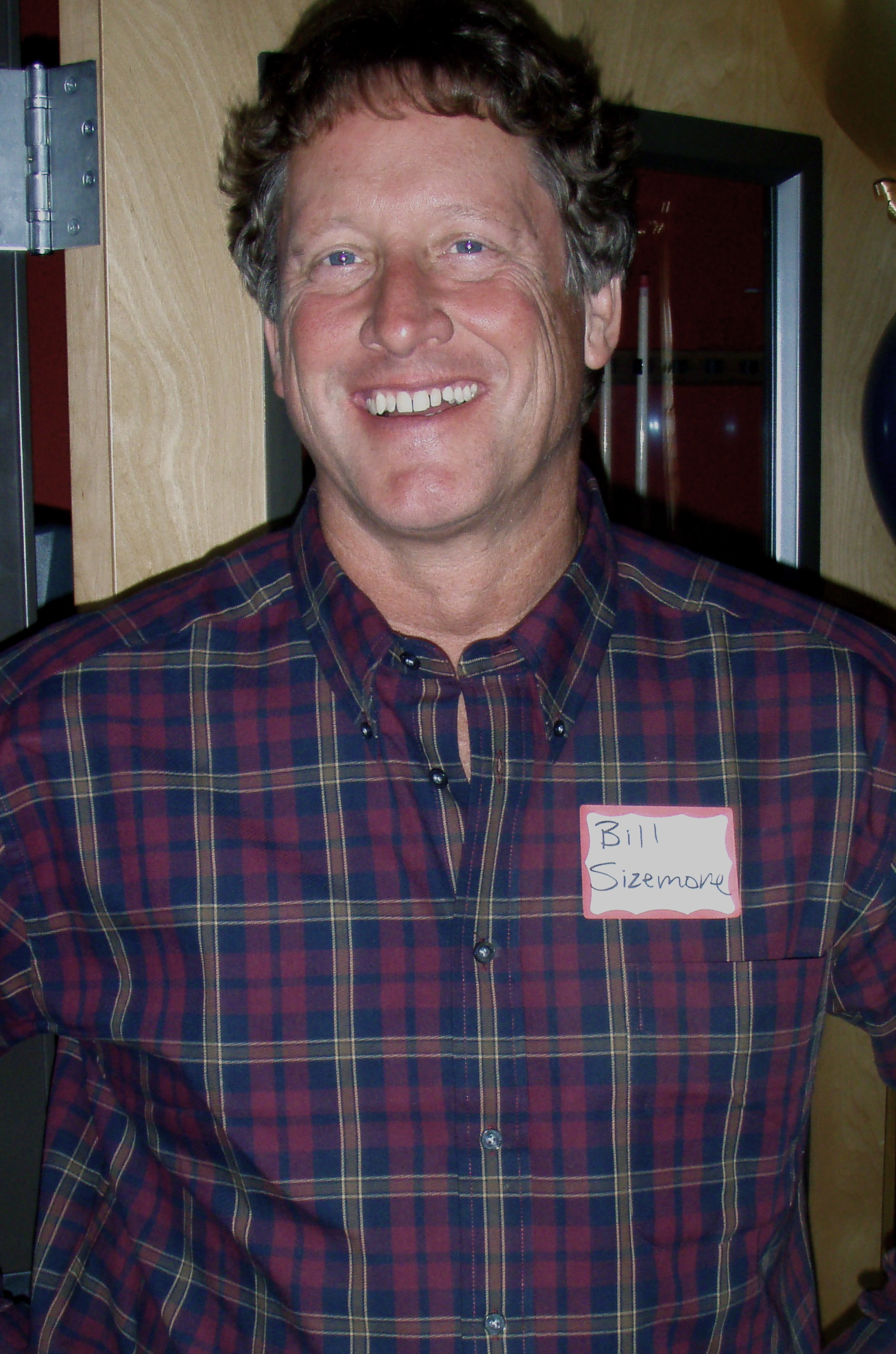
Bill Sizemore

The tax revolt manifested itself in a series of budget battles in the Oregon Legislature about school funding, the Oregon Health Plan, and other spending priorities during the late 1990s. Then Governor John Kitzhaber and the Republican leadership in the legislature clashed repeatedly over budget priorities.

In 2000, Don McIntire helped place Measure 8 on Oregon's ballot, which would have limited state spending to 15 percent of personal income for the previous biennium. Measure 8 was defeated by a margin of 43.5% to 56.5%. However, in the same election Oregonians enshrined the so-called "kicker"—a rebate to taxpayers when state tax revenues were 2% over forecasts—into the state constitution with Measure 86, which passed 62% to 38%. Oregon is the only state with a ”kicker.” Originally sent to taxpayers as a check, it is now returned as a credit toward state income tax returns. In 2024, the “kicker” will be a record $5.6 billion.

Anti-tax activists defeated two proposals in 2003 and 2004 (Measure 28 and Measure 30), which were referred to voters by the Oregon State Legislature to increase income taxes temporarily.

Sizemore's group ran into legal problems in 2002. Sizemore sparked the ire of several public employee unions with a series of initiatives aimed at reducing public employee pensions and reducing their political power. The unions responded by tracking signature gatherers hired by Sizemore to place measures on the ballot. After documenting instances of fraud by signature gatherers, the Oregon Education Association, a teachers' union, successfully sued Sizemore's organization under racketeering laws in 2003. The $2.3 million judgment against Oregon Taxpayer's United severely hurt Sizemore's ability to put measures on the ballot. The fraud allegations also led to the passage of Measure 26 in 2002, which prohibits the payment of signature gatherers on a per-signature basis, and was approved by voters 75% to 25%.

Tax activists generally claim that Oregon's government is wasteful and inefficient, arguing that the government could do better with less. They often highlight programs that they feel are unnecessary. Opponents of the tax revolt argue that passing tax decreases via ballot measure leads to short-sighted policy making, in which voters are enticed to vote with the revolt by lower tax bills and without thinking about the budget problems caused by reduced revenues.

== Notable figures in the Oregon tax revolt ==
- Bill Sizemore
- Loren Parks
- Tim Knopp

== Timeline of ballot measures ==
- Measure 5 (1990)
- Measure 47 (1996) (initiative), Measure 50 (1997) (legislative referral)
- Measure 8 (2000) (failed)
- Measure 86 (2000) (kicker)
- Measure 28 (2003) and Measure 30 (2004) (tax increase measures, defeated)
- Measure 41 (2006) and Measure 48 (2006) (both failed)
- Measure 59 (2008) (failed)
- Measures 66 and 67 (2010) (tax increase referendums, passed)

== See also ==
- Libertarianism in the United States
- List of Oregon ballot measures
- Politics of Oregon
