= Oregon Ballot Measure 58 =

Oregon Ballot Measure 58 may refer to:

- 1998 Oregon Ballot Measure 58, measure that restored the right of adopted adults to access their original birth certificates
- 2008 Oregon Ballot Measure 58, measure to require "English immersion" in Oregon's public schools
