= 2008 Oregon Ballot Measure 64 =

Measure 64
- Penalizes person, entity for using funds collected with "public resource" (defined) for "political purpose" (defined).

Results
| Choice | Votes | % |
|---|---|---|
| Yes | 835,563 | 49.44% |
| No | 854,327 | 50.56% |
| Total votes | 1,689,890 | 100.00% |
| Registered voters/turnout | | 85.7% |
- Yes 50%-60% 60%-70% No 50%-60% 60%-70%

Oregon Ballot Measure 64 (IRR 25) was an initiated state statute ballot measure on the November 4, 2008 general election ballot in Oregon.

This measure would have prohibited money collected with the use of public resources from being used for political purposes, except elections, official voter pamphlets and most lobbying. "Political purpose" is defined as: candidates, political committee or party, initiative or referendum committee, and supporting/opposing candidates or ballot measures (including signature gathering for petitions).

== Background ==
The measure was initially filed as a potential initiative by chief petitioner Bill Sizemore in 2006. In December 2007, Sizemore turned in 139,000 signatures to qualify the measure for the November 2008 ballot.

Sizemore put similar measures on the Oregon ballot in 1998 and 2000; all of them were defeated by a coalition of unions, charities, and non-profit organizations. Measure 59 was defeated 51–49; two years later, Measure 92 was defeated by a wider margin: 55–45. Also in 2000, another similar measure, Measure 98, was defeated 53–47.

Sizemore has filed nearly identical initiatives every two years since, although none qualified for the ballot until 2008. For 2010, he's filed Initiative Petition 25, which would make political contributions from unions "bribery".

== Newspaper endorsements ==
Here is how Oregon's major newspapers endorsed on Measure 64:

| Newspapers | Yes | No |
|---|---|---|
| The Oregonian | | No |
| Medford Mail-Tribune | | No |
| Statesman Journal | | No |
| Bend Bulletin | | No |
| Portland Tribune | | No |
| Eugene Register-Guard | | No |
| Daily Astorian | | No |
| East Oregonian | | No |
| Corvallis Gazette Times | | No |
| Coos Bay The World | | No |
| Willamette Week | | No |
| Yamhill Valley News Register | | No |
| Gresham Outlook | | No |

No Oregon newspapers endorsed a yes vote on Measure 64.

== Supporters ==
The official name of the initiative petition committee to put Measure 64 on the ballot was "Ban Public Money for Politics".

The Oregonian reported in September 2007 that Nevada-based millionaire Loren Parks was the leading contributor to put Measure 64 on the ballot. According to the newspaper, Parks gave money directly to the signature gathering firm, rather than to Sizemore directly.

== Opponents ==
Measure 64 was opposed by the Don't Silence Our Voice committee. It was also opposed by the Defend Oregon Coalition, which opposed all of Bill Sizemore's 2008 ballot initiatives.

Don't Silence Our Voice describes itself as "a broad coalition of community advocates, charities, and labor organizations committed to protecting the voices of all Oregonians."

The official Oregon voter's pamphlet had arguments in opposition from the United Way, the Muscular Dystrophy Association, the Oregon PTA, the Oregon Education Association, the League of Women Voters, and the Oregon State Council of Fire Fighters, among others.

=== Arguments against Measure 64 ===
- Measure 64 would limit the ability of working people to participate in politics, but would still allow out-of-state corporations and millionaires to spend money freely, giving them even more political influence in Oregon. (Steve Novick, Blue Oregon, October 24)
- From the Oregonian's No on 64 endorsement: "Of course, this would have the effect of giving Oregon firefighters and nurses less voice in Oregon politics than Loren Parks, which is not most Oregonians' view of how things should work. But the measure also runs the risk of badly hurting Oregon charitable organizations, which is why so many of them have raised their voices loudly in the campaign. Oregon public employees contribute to many state charities through payroll deductions, and the charities are concerned, after reading the measure's language and consulting attorneys, that they will be banned from speaking on behalf of their clients."
- The measure would have damaging effects, including restricting public employee unions' ability to collect dues from members.
- The Yamhill News Register says, "Though seemingly sensible on its surface, in practice, both these measures prohibit political free speech by public employees.\
- It was authored by Bill Sizemore

=== Donors opposing Measure 64 ===
The Oregon Nurses Association donated $500,000 to the campaign against the proposal.

Defend Oregon, as a committee, is fighting seven different ballot measures, and supporting two others. As a result, it is not possible to discern how much of its campaign warchest is going specifically to defeat Measure 59. Altogether, the group has raised over $6 million in 2008.

Major donations to the Defend Oregon group as of October 8 include:

- $4.1 million from the Oregon Education Association.,
- $100,000 from School Employees Exercising Democracy (SEED)
- $100,000 from the AFL-CIO.
- $50,000 from Oregon AFSCME Council 75.

== Petition drive history ==
On May 13, 2008, the Oregon Secretary of State announced that according to an unofficial verification conducted by their office, supporters of the measure had turned in 87,348 valid signatures, slightly more than the 82,769 required. This represented a validity rate of 66% of the 132,347 signatures turned in. Democracy Direct was hired to collect signatures for the measure,

A union-funded watchdog group asked the Oregon Secretary of State to conduct an investigation into how some of the signatures on the measure were collected. Secretary of State Bill Bradbury said, "...most all of the initiatives Oregon voters will decide this fall got there through practices that are now illegal. But those practices were legal at the time most of the signatures were submitted." A lawsuit has been filed in federal court challenging the constitutionality of the new laws governing the initiative process in Oregon.
