= 2008 Oregon Secretary of State election =

- November 4, 2008
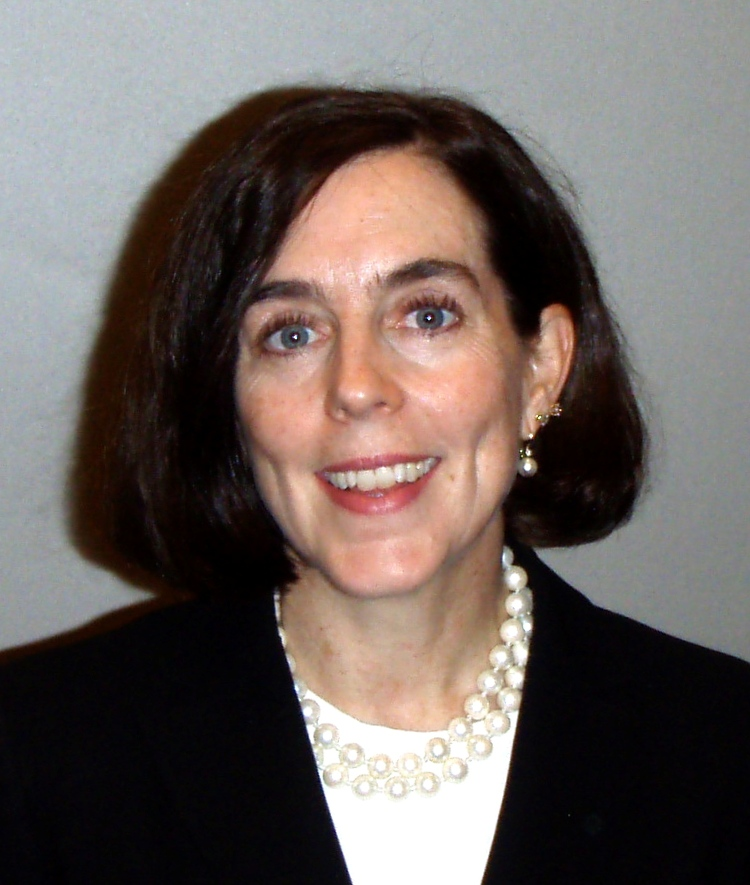

Nominee	Kate Brown	Rick Dancer
Party	Democratic	Republican
Popular vote	873,968	785,740
Percentage	50.99%	45.84%
- County results Brown: 40–50% 50–60% 70–80% Dancer: 50–60% 60–70% 70–80%
Secretary of State before election
Bill Bradbury
Democratic
Elected Secretary of State
Kate Brown
Democratic

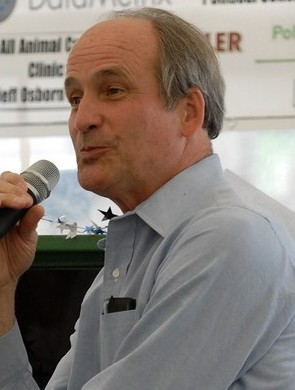
The incumbent in 2008, Bill Bradbury. His term expired on January 5, 2009.

The 2008 Oregon Secretary of State election was held on November 4, 2008, to elect the Oregon Secretary of State. Incumbent Democratic Secretary of State Bill Bradbury was term limited and could not run for a third consecutive term in office. Democratic state senator Kate Brown defeated Republican journalist Rick Dancer.

== Democratic primary ==
=== Candidates ===
- Kate Brown, state senator
- Rick Metsger, state senator
- Vicki Walker, state senator
- Paul Damian Wells, electrical engineer

=== Debate ===
2010 Oregon Secretary of State election Democratic primary debate
No.	Date	Host	Moderator	Link	Democratic	Democratic	Democratic
Key: P Participant A Absent N Not invited I Invited W Withdrawn							
Key: P Participant A Absent N Not invited I Invited W Withdrawn					Kate Brown	Rick Metsger	Vicki Walker
1	May 2, 2008	City Club of Portland	Rod Gramer	YouTube	P	P	P

=== Results ===
Democratic Primary results
Party	Candidate	Votes	%
Democratic	Kate Brown	227,853	46.78
Democratic	Rick Metsger	145,820	29.93
Democratic	Vicki Walker	96,835	19.88
Democratic	Paul Damian Wells	14,696	3.01
Democratic	write-ins	1,842	0.37
Total votes		487,046	100

== Republican primary ==
=== Candidates ===
- Rick Dancer, journalist

=== Results ===
Republican Primary results
Party	Candidate	Votes	%
Republican	Rick Dancer	253,334	98.72
Republican	write-ins	3,281	1.27
Total votes		256,615	100

== Other candidates ==
- Seth Alan Woolley (Libertarian), software engineer

== Results ==
Oregon Secretary of State – General Election Results
Party	Candidate	Votes	%
Democratic	Kate Brown	873,968	50.99
Republican	Rick Dancer	785,740	45.84
Pacific Green	Seth Alan Woolley	51,271	2.99
	write-ins	2,740	0.15
Total votes		1,684,115	100
