= 2008 Oregon Ballot Measure 56 =

Measure 56
- Amends Constitution: Provides That May And November Property Tax Elections Are Decided By Majority Of Voters Voting.

Results
Choice	Votes	%
Yes	959,118	56.60%
No	735,500	43.40%
Total votes	1,694,618	100.00%
Registered voters/turnout		85.7%
- Results by county Yes 50%-60% 60%-70% No 50%-60%

Oregon Ballot Measure 56 or House Joint Resolution 15 (HJR 15) is a legislatively referred constitutional amendment that enacted law which provides that property tax elections decided at May and November elections will be decided by a majority of voters who are voting in the relevant election. It repealed the double majority requirement passed by the voters in the 1990s via Measures 47 and 50, which requires that, for non-general elections, all bond measures can pass only when a majority of registered voters turn out.

The measure appeared on the November 4, 2008 general election ballot in Oregon and was passed with 56.6% of the vote.

Vote tallies by county:

County	Yes	Votes	No	Votes	Total
Baker	45.60	3,794	54.40	4,527	8,321
Benton	60.15	25,825	39.85	17,106	42,931
Clackamas	54.54	96,605	45.46	80,525	177,130
Clatsop	58.96	10,122	41.04	7,046	17,168
Columbia	50.52	11,861	49.48	11,619	23,480
Coos	50.46	14,896	49.54	14,623	29,519
Crook	46.37	4,543	53.63	5,254	9,797
Curry	48.23	5,552	51.77	5,960	11,512
Deschutes	52.25	38,769	47.75	35,428	74,197
Douglas	47.76	23,696	52.24	25,919	49,615
Gilliam	54.20	568	45.80	480	1,048
Grant	45.14	1,645	54.86	1,999	3,644
Harney	48.81	1,688	51.19	1,770	3,458
Hood River	58.06	5,259	41.94	3,799	9,058
Jackson	52.82	49,843	47.18	44,527	94,370
Jefferson	49.51	3,899	50.49	3,976	7,875
Josephine	47.36	18,627	52.64	20,704	39,331
Klamath	46.49	12,908	53.51	14,856	27,764
Lake	43.80	1,518	56.20	1,948	3,466
Lane	60.35	102,750	39.65	67,504	170,254
Lincoln	55.46	12,523	44.54	10,058	22,581
Linn	47.05	22,976	52.95	25,858	48,834
Malheur	42.75	4,222	57.25	5,655	9,877
Marion	52.82	60,894	47.18	54,402	115,296
Morrow	52.49	2,045	47.51	1,851	3,896
Multnomah	68.26	228,199	31.74	106,114	334,313
Polk	52.68	17,739	47.32	15,935	33,674
Sherman	48.71	471	51.29	496	967
Tillamook	52.38	6,606	47.62	6,006	12,612
Umatilla	51.88	12,461	48.12	11,560	24,021
Union	50.17	5,943	49.83	5,902	11,845
Wallowa	48.46	1,995	51.54	2,122	4,117
Wasco	54.85	5,860	45.15	4,824	10,684
Washington	55.95	120,957	44.05	95,240	216,197
Wheeler	43.38	334	56.62	436	770
Yamhill	52.51	21,525	47.49	19,471	40,996

== Supporters ==
Measure 56 was supported by the Voting Matters Coalition, which included the League of Women Voters of Oregon, Human Services Coalition of Oregon, Ecumenical Ministries of Oregon, Basic Rights Oregon, Coalition for a Livable Future, Elders in Action, and Oregon PTA.

Official Voters' Pamphlet arguments in favor can be found at the Oregon Secretary of State's November 4, 2008 Voters' Pamphlet of Measures.

=== Newspaper endorsements ===
Here is how Oregon's major newspapers have endorsed on the measure:

Newspapers	Yes	No
The Oregonian	Yes	
Medford Mail-Tribune	Yes	
Statesman Journal	Yes	
Bend Bulletin	Yes	
Portland Tribune	Yes	
Eugene Register-Guard	Yes	
Daily Astorian	Yes	
East Oregonian	Yes	
Corvallis Gazette Times	Yes	
Coos Bay The World	Yes	
Willamette Week	Yes	
Yamhill Valley News Register	Yes	
Gresham Outlook	Yes	

=== Arguments in favor ===
Notable arguments made in support of the measure included:

- Measure 56 restores the basic democratic principle that elections should be decided by a majority of the voters who take their time to cast a ballot. Giving non-voters as much—or more—power than the people who actually vote is inherently undemocratic and unfair.
- Under Oregon's Vote By Mail, there are no longer any "sneaker" elections—a ballot arrives in the mailbox of every voter any time there is an election, and when there are property tax proposals on the ballot, they are clearly and boldly marked on the front of the envelope. Voters who don't support a measure simply have to vote no.
- The "double majority" rule rewards people for not participating, which runs counter the idea of participatory democracy.
- Oregon has been plagued with budget crises since the passage of Measure 47 in 1996. Since then, the state has been working to reign in spending and work for a balanced budget, but it's come at the severe expense of important programs, such as education. Other options must be on the table and Measure 47 removes those options.
- Measure 47 is undemocratic and Measure 56 would eliminate that element of our electoral system. Functionally, everyone who chooses not to or cannot vote in a given election, votes NO on the measures that 47 applies to, even if they otherwise would have voted YES. This makes it extremely difficult to get such important measures passed and puts NO campaigns at an unfair advantage. Voter turnout in Oregon is rarely large enough to achieve a supermajority and it is notoriously low in midterm elections where a president is not being voted on. This is unfair and detrimental to our state
- A further effect of Measure 47 is to ensure that those who cannot vote but are still registered vote NO. If, for example, Registered Voter A dies a month before a scheduled election, his death is not likely to be reflected on the voter roles and he will in effect vote NO from the grave. Or a convicted felon whose voting rights are relinquished may still show up on voter roles and Measure 47 effectively gives that felon the right to vote, but only to vote NO.
- Measure 56 will restore an important part of democracy in Oregon.

== Opponents ==
Steve Buckstein of the non-partisan, non-profit Cascade Policy Institute wrote a commentary that says, "Critics of Oregon's so-called 'double majority' rule say it isn't democratic because a simple majority of those voting may not be able to pass a tax measure. But in reality, just 25% of registered voters can raise taxes under 'double-majority.' 'Double majority' is a sensible taxpayer safeguard that should be kept, and even strengthened."

=== Opposing arguments ===
Notable arguments made in opposition to the measure included:

- Measure 56 would weaken the "double majority" rule (which has stopped numerous tax hikes) that requires 50 percent plus one of registered voters to turn out and 50 percent plus one of the votes in favor of a potential tax hike before it can take effect.
- Oregonians voted in 1996 and again in 1997 to place the double majority requirement on certain property tax elections into the state Constitution. In 1998 voters rejected an attempt by the legislature to repeal it. Now, the legislature has placed a similar measure on this November's ballot. It will ask Oregonians to reverse a decision we've already made three times before.
- The double majority rule does not require a supermajority to pass any tax. In fact, the opposite is true. If only fifty percent of registered voters participate in a given election, and if just fifty percent plus one of those voters approve a property tax measure, simple math tells us that a mere 25 percent of all registered voters can impose that tax on all property owners in the jurisdiction. In effect, they can impose that tax on all renters, too, since landlords usually pass taxes on to their tenants in the form of higher rents.
- Before the rule was in place, taxes could be imposed by a mere 20 percent, or 10 percent, or even a smaller percentage of all registered voters. Now, it takes at least 25 percent of all registered voters to impose certain property taxes in other than a general election.
- Rather than repeal this sensible taxpayer safeguard, it might be more "democratic" to strengthen it, perhaps by requiring a majority of all registered voters to vote Yes before any tax can be imposed.
