= Kate Brown =

American politician (born 1960)

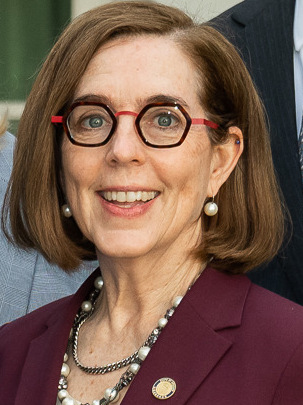
- Brown in 2022

38th Governor of Oregon
- In office February 18, 2015 – January 9, 2023
- Preceded by: John Kitzhaber
- Succeeded by: Tina Kotek

24th Secretary of State of Oregon
- In office January 5, 2009 – February 18, 2015
- Governor: Ted Kulongoski; John Kitzhaber
- Preceded by: Bill Bradbury
- Succeeded by: Jeanne Atkins

Member of the Oregon Senate from the 21st district
- In office January 13, 1997 – January 2, 2009
- Preceded by: Shirley Gold
- Succeeded by: Diane Rosenbaum

Member of the Oregon House of Representatives from the 13th district
- In office November 26, 1991 – January 12, 1997
- Preceded by: Judy Bauman
- Succeeded by: Dan Gardner

Personal details
- Born: Katherine Brown; June 21, 1960 (age 66) Torrejón de Ardoz, Spain
- Party: Democratic
- Spouse: Dan Little (m. 1996)
- Children: 2 stepchildren
- Education: University of Colorado, Boulder (BA); Lewis and Clark College (JD)
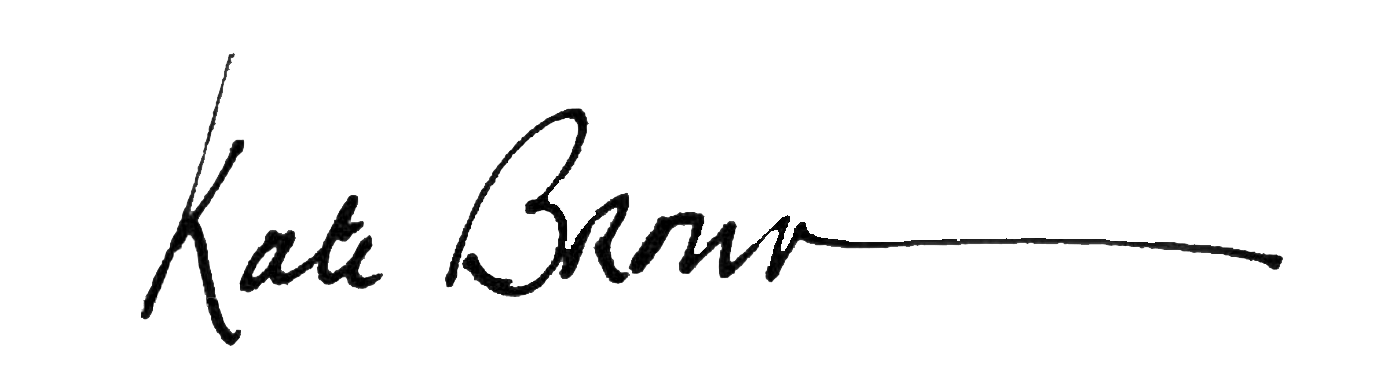
- Signature

Katherine Brown (born June 21, 1960) is an American politician and attorney who served as the 38th governor of Oregon from 2015 to 2023. She is a member of the Democratic Party.

Previously, Brown served in the Oregon House of Representatives from 1991 to 1997 and the Oregon Senate from 1997 to 2009, serving as majority leader from 2003 to 2009. She was elected Oregon Secretary of State in 2008 and re-elected in 2012. In 2015, she became governor of Oregon after John Kitzhaber resigned due to a corruption scandal. She was elected to serve out the remainder of his term in a 2016 special election, and was re-elected to a full term in 2018.

Brown is bisexual and the first openly LGBT person elected to statewide office and the first openly LGBT person elected governor of a U.S. state. By the end of her term, Brown had the lowest approval ratings of any incumbent U.S. governor at that time.

== Early life and education ==
Brown was born in Torrejón de Ardoz in Spain, where her father, Dr. James Paterson Brown, an eye doctor, was serving in the United States Air Force, at Torrejón Air Base. She grew up in Minnesota and graduated from Mounds View High School in Arden Hills, Minnesota in 1978. She earned a Bachelor of Arts in Environmental Conservation with a certificate in women's studies from the University of Colorado Boulder in 1981 and a J.D. degree and certificate in environmental law from the Lewis & Clark College Law School in 1985.

== Career ==
=== Oregon Legislative Assembly ===
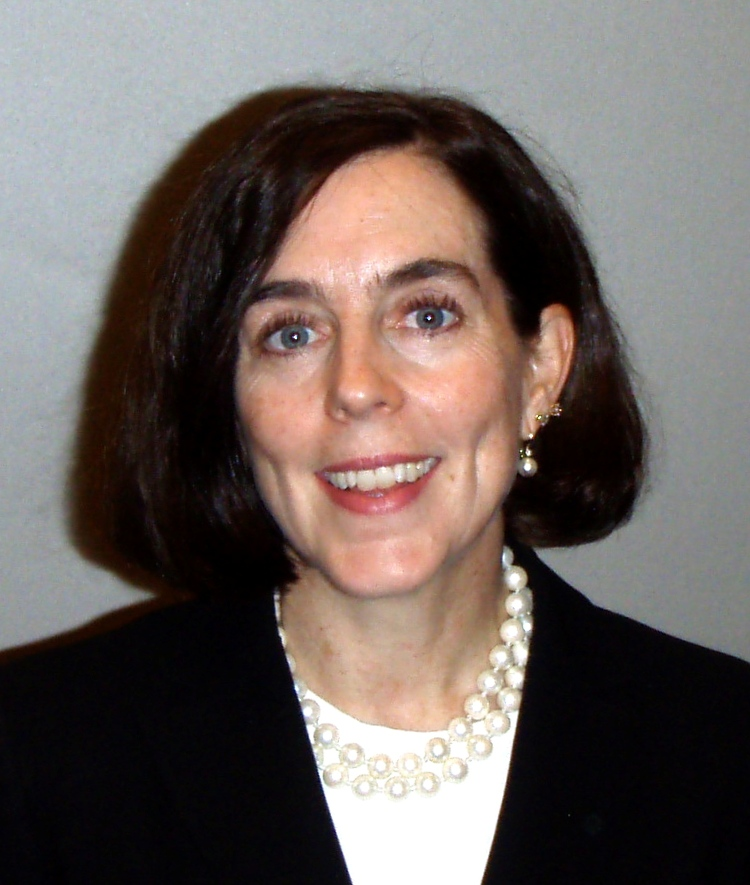
Brown in 2008

Brown was appointed to the Oregon House of Representatives in 1991, filling a vacancy in a Portland seat left by predecessor Judy Bauman, who took an executive appointment. She was elected to a second term before being elected to the Oregon State Senate in 1996. Two years later, she was elected Senate Democratic Leader. In 2003, she was elected Majority Leader of the Oregon Senate.

Brown was a top fundraiser for her caucus, helping the Democrats tie the Republicans in the Oregon Senate in 2003. That same year she also won the position of caucus leader. Brown helped round up votes to pass a bill that year reforming the Oregon Public Employees Retirement System, although she ultimately voted against it to preserve her relationship with labor unions.

In July 2007, Brown announced that she would give up her seat in the Oregon Senate to be a candidate for Oregon Secretary of State the next year. On May 20, 2008, Brown won the election for the Democratic nomination for Secretary of State, and on November 5 she won the general election by a 51–46% margin against Republican candidate Rick Dancer.

=== Oregon Secretary of State ===
Coming into office, one of Brown's priorities was to perform rigorous performance audits to help balance the budget. In 2008, for every dollar the State spent, performance audits returned $8 in cost savings. In 2010 Brown reported she delivered $64 in cost savings and efficiencies for every dollar invested in the Division.

In 2009 Brown introduced and passed House Bill 2005 to crack down on fraud and abuse in the initiative and referendum system. It gave the Secretary of State more power to prosecute fraud and enforce the constitutional ban on paying per signature on initiatives.

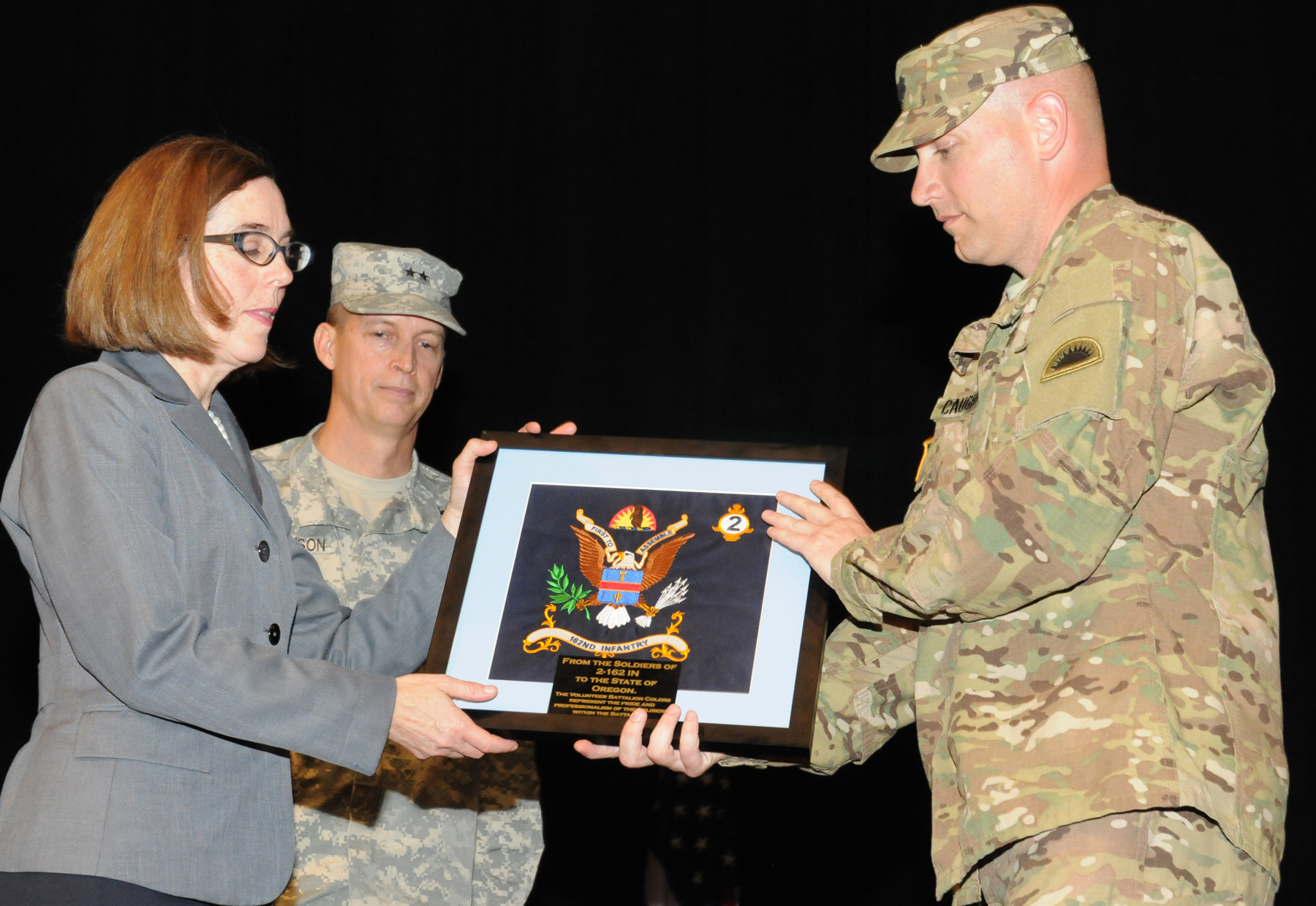
Brown accepting an award from the Oregon National Guard, June 2014

Brown also implemented online voter registration. As of March 2010, a year after its introduction, Oregon Public Broadcasting noted nearly 87,000 Oregonians had already registered online to vote.

In 2009 the Aspen Institute named Brown as one of 24 "Rising Stars" in American politics and awarded her a Rodel Fellowship. The program is a two-year fellowship designed to break down partisan barriers and explore the responsibilities of public leadership and good governance.

In October 2012 StateTech magazine highlighted Brown's use of iPad and tablet technology to increase accessibility for voters with disabilities. In 2011 Oregon became the first jurisdiction in the country to use this technology to help voters with disabilities mark their ballots.

In January 2015 Brown submitted a letter to the Federal Communications Commission (FCC) in support of the purchase of Time Warner Cable by Comcast that had been almost entirely ghostwritten by Comcast, a company that has made a total of over $10,000 in donations to her past election campaigns.

== Governor of Oregon (2015–2023) ==
On February 18, 2015, Governor John Kitzhaber resigned amid a public corruption scandal just three months after his reelection; Brown succeeded him since the Constitution of Oregon identifies the secretary of state as the successor when the governor leaves office prematurely.

Brown named Brian Shipley, a lobbyist for Oregon Health & Science University and former deputy chief of staff to Governor Ted Kulongoski, as her chief of staff. She appointed Jeanne Atkins secretary of state.

Upon taking office, Brown extended the moratorium on executions Kitzhaber had enacted. In 2015, she also signed a "motor voter" bill she had championed while secretary of state, to automatically register voters using their driver's license data. At Politico's "State Solutions" voter engagement conference, Brown said, "Registration is a barrier to people participating in this process" and "Voting is a fundamental right of being a citizen, and people across the country should have the ability to access this fundamental right without barriers like registration". Addressing critics of policies aimed at increasing voter turnout, such as Oregon's "motor voter" law, she said, "I think the good news is, in Oregon, we actually want people to vote in our state."

In July 2016, Brown signed HB3402, which raised the maximum speed limit to 70 mph on I-82 and sections of I-84 and US-95. Previously, the maximum speed limit on Oregon highways was 65 mph. This bill also raised speed limits on non-interstate highways in eastern Oregon from 55 mph to 65 mph.

Oregon law required a special election in November 2016 for the two years remaining in Kitzhaber's unfinished term as governor. By April 2016, Brown had raised over $800,000 for her campaign in 2016 alone, while her closest Democratic primary competitor, Julian Bell, had raised $33,000. She defeated Bell, Chet Chance, Kevin M. Forsythe, Steve Johnson, and Dave Stauffer for the Democratic nomination. She won the general election against Republican Party nominee Bud Pierce, Independent Party nominee Cliff Thomason, Libertarian Party nominee James Foster, and Constitution Party nominee Aaron Donald Auer, receiving 51% of the vote.

In January 2017, Brown named Nik Blosser her third chief of staff after the resignation of former chief of staff Kristen Leonard. In June 2017, Brown signed into law the Oregon Equal Pay Act, which banned employers from using job seekers' prior salaries in hiring decisions, and a transgender equity bill.

Brown was reelected in 2018, defeating Republican Knute Buehler 50.0% to 43.9%, with Independent Party nominee Patrick Starnes, Libertarian Party nominee Nick Chen, Constitution Party nominee Aaron Auer, and Progressive Party nominee Chris Henry taking the remaining votes. She had received 82% in the Democratic primary.

In a November 2018 budget plan, Brown proposed a 30-year plan to limit Oregon's greenhouse gas emissions via a cap-and-trade system. On 20 June 2019, Brown authorized state troopers to search for and return 11 Republican state senators after the Oregon Senate ordered the Sergeant-at-Arms to compel them to attend a Senate session. The senators had left to prevent a quorum in the Senate and thereby block the passage of a sweeping climate change bill.

In 2019, after a measles outbreak in Oregon, Brown urged parents to vaccinate their children.

In response to the ongoing global COVID-19 pandemic, Brown publicly urged Oregonians to stay home to avoid spreading the virus, but was initially criticized for not issuing a shelter-in-place order. The order was officially issued on March 23, 2020.

In August 2021, The Oregonian wrote, "Gov. Kate Brown signed a law to allow Oregon students to graduate without proving they can write or do math."

In December 2022, Brown commuted the sentences of all 17 people on death row in Oregon, calling the death penalty "dysfunctional and immoral" and something that "had never been administered fairly or equitably in Oregon."

=== Criticism ===
As secretary of state, Brown faced political backlash over the scheduling of the election for labor commissioner between Democrat Brad Avakian and Republican Bruce Starr. The election for this position is typically held in May, but in 2009 the Oregon legislature passed bipartisan House Bill 2095, which required the election to be held in November 2012. Despite this, Starr accused Brown of pushing the election to November to help Avakian win. Brown called his accusations "unfounded and outrageous", saying her office was simply enforcing a "very clear" law, and that "this is an issue of election law, not politics". Starr filed a lawsuit attempting to force Brown to hold the election in May, but the lawsuit was denied because Starr could not show he was likely to prevail on the merits of his case.

In March 2018, Brown was criticized for firing state librarian MaryKay Dahlgreen, a move that surprised members of the Oregon State Library Board of Directors. She was accused of mismanaging Oregon DHS Child Welfare in audits published in January 2018.

In July 2018, Brown brokered meetings between several large Oregon-based companies, including Nike, and union leaders over campaigns to include Initiative Petition 25, a corporate transparency initiative, and Measure 104, geared toward limiting reductions in corporate tax breaks, on the November ballot. Brown's office said her goal was to prevent both initiatives from coming to fruition. She later faced complaints over the alleged brokering of an agreement—supposedly in exchange for financial support through a Nike PAC—in order to keep Petition 25 off the ballot. That year, Nike founder Phil Knight contributed over $1 million to Brown's Republican opponent's campaign, although the company itself gave financial support to Brown.

Only a week after the submission of an official complaint, Oregon's Department of Justice found no grounds for an investigation, with the Department's Criminal Justice Division chief council writing, "there is no information that the proponents of [Initiative Petition 25] sought to qualify the petition for the ballot for an improper purpose." Brown and supporters later characterized the complaint as a political ploy. Initiative Petition 25's sponsors ultimately withheld it from the November ballot. Despite having obtained the requisite number of signatures before the submission deadline, union leaders cited an "internal decision", rather than Nike's or Brown's influence, in choosing not to proceed. With Measure 104 and several other anti-tax and anti-labor bills having already secured spaces on the ballot, AFSCME political director Joe Baessler called the issue a "question of resources".

Brown's process in appointing Misha Isaak, formerly her general attorney, to the Oregon Court of Appeals in August 2019 caused concern among members of the State Bar Association. After the Public Records Advocate resigned and released correspondence damaging to Isaak, more people called on Brown to revoke the appointment, including former Oregon Supreme Court Justice Edwin Peterson.

In November 2021, Brown had a 43% job approval rating, the lowest of any U.S. governor. The same poll found that her approval rating declined to 40% in October 2022, again the lowest in the country.

=== 2019 recall attempt ===
In 2019, the Oregon Republican Party and an independent group, "Flush Down Kate Brown", attempted to remove Brown by recall petition, but fell 40,790 signatures short of the required 280,050.

=== 2020 recall attempt ===
In 2020, Bill Currier, chairman of the Oregon Republican Party and mayor of Adair Village, launched another recall petition. It cited many of the concerns in the 2019 petition in addition to others, mostly focused on her handling of the COVID-19 pandemic in Oregon. Wilsonville activist Kelsey Massey started another petition. One must collect at least 280,050 signatures to trigger a verification process, the first step toward a recall election. On August 31, Currier announced that the recall would not be on the ballot because it had not received enough signatures. For the Massey petition, no signatures were submitted by the July 31 deadline.

== Political views ==
According to Brown, her political philosophy shifted from the time she was first elected to the state legislature to her later public service. "When I became the caucus leader, which was in 1999, I had caucus members from very diverse parts of the state and very diverse perspectives...As the Democratic leader, I realized I represented all of the Democrats in the state, not just from my district. So that was really a shift in thinking," she said.

Brown supports criminal justice reform by opposing mass incarceration and made that a hallmark of her term as governor, commuting the sentences of around 1,100 people during her term.

== Personal life ==
Following the conclusion of her governorship, Brown was a Spring 2023 Visiting Fellow at the Kennedy School Institute of Politics of Harvard University, then a Fall 2023 Pritzker Fellow at the University of Chicago Institute of Politics. She became President of the Willamette Falls Trust on May 28, 2024. Brown lives with her husband, Dan Little, and has two stepchildren. She is the country's first openly bisexual statewide office holder and first openly bisexual governor.

== Electoral history ==
=== Oregon State Senate ===
==== 2004 ====
Oregon's State Senate 21st District Democratic Primary Election, 2004
Party	Candidate	Votes	%
Democratic	Kate Brown (Incumbent)	13,541	98.81%
	write-ins	163	1.19%
Total votes		13,704	100%

Oregon's State Senate 21st District Election, 2004
Party	Candidate	Votes	%
Democratic	Kate Brown (Incumbent)	52,278	86.52%
Libertarian	Theresa Reed	4,563	7.55%
Constitution	Paul deParrie	3,126	5.17%
	write-ins	455	0.75%
Total votes		60,422	100%

=== Oregon Secretary of State ===
==== 2008 ====
Oregon Secretary of State Democratic Primary Election, 2008
Party	Candidate	Votes	%
Democratic	Kate Brown	277,853	51.74%
Democratic	Rick Metsger	145,820	27.15%
Democratic	Vicki Walker	96,835	18.03%
Democratic	Paul Damian Wells	14,696	2.74%
	write-ins	1,842	0.34%
Total votes		537,046	100%

Oregon Secretary of State Election, 2008
Party	Candidate	Votes	%
Democratic	Kate Brown	873,968	51.00%
Republican	Rick Dancer	785,740	45.85%
Pacific Green	Seth Alan Woolley	51,271	2.99%
	write-ins	2,740	0.16%
Total votes		1,713,719	100%

==== 2012 ====
Oregon Secretary of State Democratic Primary Election, 2012
Party	Candidate	Votes	%
Democratic	Kate Brown (Incumbent)	284,470	91.13%
Democratic	Paul Damian Wells	26,177	8.39%
	write-ins	1,510	0.48%
Total votes		312,157	100%

Oregon Secretary of State Election, 2012
Party	Candidate	Votes	%
Democratic	Kate Brown (Incumbent)	863,656	51.28%
Republican	Knute Buehler	727,607	43.20%
Pacific Green	Seth Woolley	44,235	2.63%
Libertarian	Bruce Alexander Knight	24,273	1.44%
Progressive	Robert Wolfe	21,783	1.29%
	write-ins	2,561	0.15%
Total votes		1,684,115	100%

=== Governor of Oregon ===
==== 2016 ====
Oregon Gubernatorial Special Democratic Primary Election, 2016
Party	Candidate	Votes	%
Democratic	Kate Brown (Incumbent)	494,890	83.06%
Democratic	Julian Bell	49,113	8.24%
Democratic	Dave Stauffer	16,108	2.70%
Democratic	Steve Johnson	13,363	2.24%
Democratic	Kevin Forsythe	10,147	1.70%
Democratic	Chet Chance	5,636	0.95%
	write-ins	6,595	1.11%
Total votes		595,852	100%

Oregon Gubernatorial Special Election, 2016
Party	Candidate	Votes	%
Democratic	Kate Brown (Incumbent)	985,027	50.62%
Republican	Bud Pierce	845,609	43.45%
Independent Party	Cliff Thomason	47,481	2.44%
Libertarian	James Foster	45,191	2.32%
Constitution	Aaron Donald Auer	19,400	1.00%
	write-ins	3,338	0.17%
Total votes		1,946,046	100%

==== 2018 ====
Oregon Gubernatorial Democratic Primary Election, 2018
Party	Candidate	Votes	%
Democratic	Kate Brown (Incumbent)	324,541	81.9%
Democratic	Ed Jones	33,464	8.4%
Democratic	Candace Neville	29,110	7.4%
	write-ins	8,912	2.3%
Total votes		396,027	100%

Oregon Gubernatorial Election, 2018
Party	Candidate	Votes	%
Democratic	Kate Brown (Incumbent)	885,232	50.0%
Republican	Knute Buehler	776,558	43.9%
Independent Party	Patrick Starnes	50,879	2.9%
Libertarian	Nick Chen	26,587	1.5%
Constitution	Aaron Auer	19,645	1.1%
Progressive	Chris Henry	10,252	0.6%
Total votes		1,769,153	100%

== Awards and distinctions ==
- 1995 – Recipient, Woman of Achievement Award from the Oregon Commission for Women
- 2004 – Recipient, National Public and Community Service Award from the American Mental Health Counselors Association
- 2007 – Recipient, President's Award of Merit from the Oregon State Bar
- 2015 – Was listed as one of the nine runners-up for The Advocate's Person of the Year
- 2017 – Named to the inaugural NBC Out #Pride30 list
- Profiles in Courage by Basic Rights Oregon

== See also ==
- List of United States governors born outside the United States
- List of female governors in the United States
- List of female secretaries of state in the United States
- List of LGBTQ people from Portland, Oregon
- List of openly LGBTQ heads of state and government
- List of first openly LGBTQ politicians in the United States

Party political offices
Preceded by Bill Bradbury	Democratic nominee for Secretary of State of Oregon; 2008, 2012	Succeeded by Brad Avakian
Preceded by John Kitzhaber	Democratic nominee for Governor of Oregon; 2016, 2018	Succeeded by Tina Kotek
Political offices
Preceded by Bill Bradbury	Secretary of State of Oregon; 2009–2015	Succeeded by Jeanne Atkins
Preceded by John Kitzhaber	Governor of Oregon; 2015–2023	Succeeded by Tina Kotek
U.S. order of precedence (ceremonial)
Preceded by Ted Kulongoski as Former Governor	Order of precedence of the United States; Within Oregon	Succeeded by Jack Markell as Former Governor
Preceded by Ted Kulongoski as Former Governor	Order of precedence of the United States; Outside Oregon	Succeeded by John W. Carlin as Former Governor
