= Oregon tax rebate =

Rebate for Oregon taxes

The Oregon tax rebate, commonly referred to as the kicker, is a rebate calculated for both individual and corporate taxpayers in the U.S. state of Oregon when a revenue surplus exists at the end of each biennium, which occurs in odd years. The Oregon Constitution mandates that the rebate be issued when the calculated revenue for a given biennium exceeds the forecast revenue by at least two percent, which is then reflected in returns for odd tax years. Taxpayers will therefore typically file and receive any potential refund reflecting a kicker in even calendar years. The law was first enacted by ballot measure in 1980, and was entered into the Oregon Constitution with the enactment of Ballot Measure 86 in 2000.

The Oregon Department of Revenue distributes the rebate to individuals in what is known to Oregonians as a kicker credit. The kicker credit either increases the amount of a taxpayer's refund or decreases the amount of tax they owe.

If the corporate kicker is triggered, the excess is returned to the state general fund to provide additional funding to K–12 schools. This is the result of the passage of 2012's Ballot Measure 85. Prior to that time, the rebate was distributed to the corporations.

== History ==
Rising concerns over property taxes and inflation in the 1970s urged lawmakers all over the country to draft tax cut plans; notably California's Proposition 13, which inspired the Oregon legislature to draft their own bill aimed at limiting what was perceived as excessive growth. Their 1979 tax relief package aimed to stem rising property taxes, reduce individual taxpayer burden, and limit spending from the state's general fund. Under the bill, property owners received a 30-percent reduction in property taxes, and the state would be required to rebate "excessive" surplus to the taxpayers.

The kicker law was overwhelmingly approved by voters in 1980, but the first kicker rebate did not occur until 1985 when the calculated revenue exceeded the forecast revenue by 7.7 percent ($88.7 million). The kicker was triggered again in 1987 (16.6%, $224.2 million) and 1989 (9.8%, $175.2 million).

In 1991 and 1993, budget problems relating to Ballot Measure 5 of 1990 prompted lawmakers to suspend the kicker, withholding $246 million from taxpayers.

Through 2007, rebates occurred five more times; 1995 (6.27%, $162.8 million), 1997 (14.37%, $431.5 million), 1999 (4.57%, $167.3 million), 2001 (6.02%, 253.6 million), and 2007 (18.6%, $1,071.2 million).

In 1999, Measure 86 was drafted and referred to voters. This measure, which was passed with 62% approval, placed the kicker law into the Oregon Constitution. Also as a result of the measure, an emergency vote must be called to cancel the distribution of kicker checks.

Opponents of the kicker law claim it prevents Oregon from retaining an appreciable economic surplus. Without an ample surplus, the state is more vulnerable to the effects of recession, such as in 2003 as when police forces were cut, schools were downsized, and healthcare was restricted. Since the very beginning of the kicker in 1980, legislators have looked to find ways around this. In 2007, lawmakers in Oregon succeeded in diverting funds from the corporate kicker to a surplus account called the rainy day fund. Further movements to eliminate the kicker altogether are underway, backed by lawmakers such as prior Governor Ted Kulongoski.

In 2012, Oregon voters passed Ballot Measure 85, which reformed the corporate kicker so that if any rebate was due, the funds would be returned to the general fund and specifically allocated to augment public school funding.

== Distribution ==
In 2007, the average kicker refund for personal incomes was $263, while the median refund was $113. The wealthiest one percent of Oregon taxpayers received one-fifth of the refund, as the kicker refund is proportional to the tax paid.

That same year, eighty-six percent of the corporate refund went to multistate corporations, and four percent of the total number of corporations received ninety-three percent of the corporate refund.

== See also ==
- Oregon tax revolt
- Oregon Tax Court
- List of Oregon ballot measures
