= 2006 Oregon Ballot Measure 48 =

Measure 48
- Amends Constitution: Limits biennial percentage increase in state spending to percentage increase in state population, plus inflation.

Results
Choice	Votes	%
Yes	379,971	29.15%
No	923,629	70.85%
Valid votes	1,303,600	93.14%
Invalid or blank votes	96,050	6.86%
Total votes	1,399,650	100.00%
Registered voters/turnout		65.95%
County results
Against
70–80%
60–70%

Oregon ballot measure 48 was one of two unsuccessful ballot measures sponsored by the Taxpayers Association of Oregon (TAO) on the November 7, 2006 general election ballot. Measure 48 (a version of the Taxpayer Bill of Rights) was an initiated constitutional amendment ballot measure. Oregon statute currently limits state appropriations to 8% of projected personal income in Oregon (with certain exceptions). If Governor declares emergency, legislature may exceed current statutory appropriations limit by 60% vote of each house. This measure would have added a constitutional provision limiting any increase in state spending from one biennium to next biennium to the percentage increase in state population, plus inflation, over previous two years. Certain exceptions to limit, including spending of: federal, donated funds; proceeds from selling certain bonds, real property; money to fund emergency funds; money to fund tax, "kicker," other refunds were included in the provisions of the measure. It also would have provided that spending limit may be exceeded by amount approved by two-thirds of each house of legislature and approved by majority of voters voting in general election.

== Background ==
The State of Oregon budgets spending in two-year periods, beginning July 1 of odd-numbered years. The Oregon Constitution requires the Legislature to adopt budgets that do not exceed the revenue predicted for that same two-year period.

A state law also limits general fund spending to eight percent of personal income for that same two-year period but has not affected spending to date. The "kicker" law that refunds taxes that exceed a revenue forecast made prior to the legislative session limits revenue available for state services. That constitutional amendment has refunded collected revenue to individuals seven times and corporations six times.

== Description of the Measure ==
Ballot Measure 48 would have restricted the amount of money the State could spend in its annual budget. It proposed to limit state spending by amending the state's constitution to provide that, unless approved by a 2/3 vote of both the Oregon House and Senate and a subsequent approval by a majority of the voters, spending for state services in a two-year period cannot exceed the amount spent in the previous two-year period plus the combined rate of the increase of the state's population and inflation in that same, previous, two-year period.

If passed, the amendment would apply to spending of aggregate revenues collected from a variety of sources including but not limited to: income tax, lottery receipts, tuition, professional licensing and other taxes and fees. The measure would not have applied to revenues from the following sources: federal funds, voluntary donations to state agencies, proceeds from the sale of bonds specifically approved by the voters and proceeds from the sale of real property at real market value to non-government entities.

The measure would not apply to money spent for the following purposes: tax and "kicker" refunds or money placed in an emergency fund or a "rainy day" reserve fund. (Money placed into an emergency or "rainy day" fund would not be available for state spending in excess of the spending limit without a 2/3 vote of the House and Senate and approval by the voters.)

The Legislative Fiscal Office estimated that the measure's effect in the 2007 biennium would restrict spending of approximately $2.2 billion out of approximately $35.6 billion in revenues estimated to be subject to the limit.

If it had been passed and put into effect, the Legislature could refund the restricted funds to taxpayers, place them in the funds noted above, leave them in the treasury and/or, with a 2/3 vote of each house of the legislature refer to voters a plan to spend them on state services.

== Election results ==
During the November 7, 2006 general election and Measure 48 was rejected by a large margin, garnering only 379,971 out 1,303,600 (29.15%) of the vote on this ballot line.

TAO, the main organized support for the measure received 94% of its funding from Illinois-based Americans for Limited Government, which sponsored similar measures in numerous states in 2006. Opposing groups also pooled their resources in pushing for the defeat of both Measures 41 and 48, spending $1.9 million.

== See also ==
- List of Oregon ballot measures
- Howard Rich, major funder of Measure 48.
- Oregon Ballot Measure 41 (2006)
