= 2010 Oregon Ballot Measures 66 and 67 =

Measure 66
- Raises tax on household income at and above $250,000 (and $125,000 for individual filers). Reduces income taxes on unemployment benefits in 2009. Provides funds currently budgeted for education, health care, public safety, other services.

Results
Choice	Votes	%
Yes	692,687	54.27%
No	583,707	45.73%
Total votes	1,276,394	100.00%
Registered voters/turnout	2,044,042	62.44%
Yes
70–80%
60–70%
50–60%
No
70–80%
60–70%
50–60%

Measures 66 and 67 are two ballot referendums that were on the January 26, 2010 special election ballot in the US state of Oregon, which proposed tax increases on corporations and on households making US$250,000 and individuals making $125,000 to help balance the state's budget. The measures referred two bills passed by the Oregon state legislature on June 11, 2009, and signed by Governor Ted Kulongoski on July 20, 2009, to the voters for approval. They were approved and became effective February 25, 2010.

== Background ==
The recession that greatly affected the American economy starting in late 2008 caused a budget shortfall in Oregon that the state legislature had to make up for. A critical factor in this process was that the 2008 general election gave Democrats a three-fifths majority in both chambers of the legislature, which is the supermajority needed to pass any bills calling for revenue increases. Among other actions, the legislature passed House Bills 2649 and 3405, raising taxes on corporations and on wealthy individuals and households, respectively. Some Oregon citizens (Note: Current funding sources of the campaign against the ballot measures can be found at this link.) started a drive to force a referendum on these bills, believing they would hurt the state's economy.

While 55,179 valid signatures from registered voters on each referendum petition were needed to qualify the referendum for the ballot, (Note: More precisely, supporters of a referendum must file a number of valid signatures from registered voters equal to four percent of votes cast in the last gubernatorial election – in this case, the 2006 gubernatorial election.) about 99,000 valid signatures were filed. Don Hamilton, spokesman for the Oregon Secretary of State's office, remarked that "it's unusually high for a statewide ballot measure." On October 8, 2009, the Secretary of State's office announced that both measures qualified for the January 26, 2010 ballot.

== Campaign ==
Businesses largely opposed the two measures, with groups such as the Associated Oregon Industries campaigning against both. The top individual donor was Phil Knight of Nike, who gave $150,000.

The yes vote was supported by educators and public employee unions. Politically, the Oregon Democratic Party supported the measures while the Oregon Republican Party opposed the measures. The campaigns for and against these measures spent the second most money ever waged on a ballot measure campaign in the state. Only Ballot Measure 50 in 2007 was more expensive than the $12.5 million spent on the yes and no campaigns of Measures 66 and 67.

== Results ==
Measure 67
- Raises $10 corporate minimum tax, business minimum tax, corporate profits tax. Provides funds currently budgeted for education, health care, public safety, other services.

Results
Choice	Votes	%
Yes	682,720	53.59%
No	591,188	46.41%
Total votes	1,273,908	100.00%
Registered voters/turnout	2,044,042	62.32%
County results
Yes
70–80%
60–70%
50–60%
No
70–80%
60–70%
50–60%

Measure 66
Choice	Votes	%
For	692,687	54.27
Against	583,707	45.73
Total	1,276,394	100.00
Registered voters/turnout	2,044,042	62.7
Source: Oregon State Elections Division

Measure 67
Choice	Votes	%
For	682,720	53.59
Against	591,188	46.41
Total	1,273,908	100.00
Registered voters/turnout	2,044,042	62.7
Source: Oregon State Elections Division

== See also ==
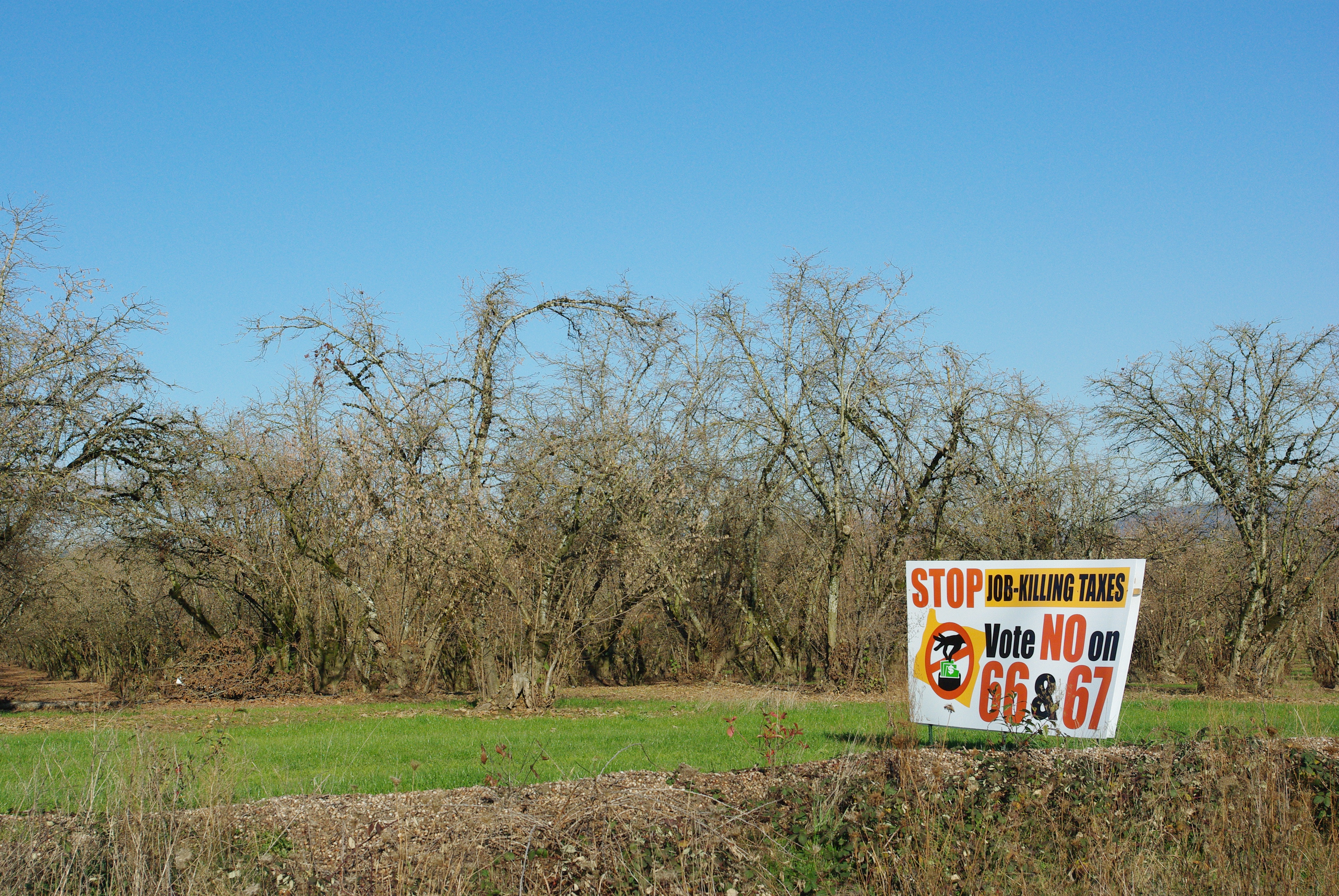
Sign campaigning for a no vote on the measures in rural Yamhill County

- List of Oregon ballot measures
- Oregon tax revolt
