= 2003 Oregon Ballot Measure 28 =

Measure 28 was a ballot measure, referred by the legislature of the U.S. state of Oregon in 2003. It would have created a temporary one-percent increase in Oregon's income tax. The tax was proposed as a way to overcome deficits to the state budget. The measure was defeated in the January 28, 2003 special election with 575,846 votes in favor, 676,312 votes against.

Budget problems, high unemployment, rising healthcare and pension costs, dominated Oregon's 2002–2003 biennium. To make up for lost revenue from medicaid financing and a tobacco settlement that helped balance the budget in previous years. the legislature approved a mixture of budget cuts and referred Measure 28 to a vote of the people. The referral was marred by controversy as Democratic governor John Kitzhaber objected to the Republican-controlled legislature's omission of the cuts that would result from the measure's failure in the ballot title (the summary of the measure provided to voters). Supporters of the measure blamed the ballot title omission for the defeat of the measure.

Proponents of the measure felt it was the only way to avoid proposed spending cuts to programs such as education and help for the elderly and mentally ill. Opponents, many part of the Oregon tax revolt, felt that increasing taxes would prolong the recession, and that the state should live within its means.

Cuts in the wake of Measure 28's defeat seemed to vindicate proponents' arguments. The day after Measure 28's defeat, Multnomah County released 144 inmates from the county jail and laid off 175 Sheriff's deputies. Some fiscal conservatives felt that wasteful spending was more to blame than the tax defeat.

Nonetheless, the high percentage of "yes" votes in the Portland metro area inspired local governments in that region to bring their own temporary tax increases to the ballot.

A year later, voters defeated a similar measure, Measure 30.

Results by county: No: 50–60%; 60–70%; 70–80%; Yes: 50–60%

To fix the issue, the state was forced to then cut back medicaid coverage and cut hundreds of millions in programs such as prisons, schools, social services. Because of the cuts, Many prisoners were released early, and many seniors lost medicaid coverage. They also raised tobacco taxes, implemented fees on nursing facilities to generate revenue, as well as a federal stimulus that helped preserve parts of the Oregon Health Plan.

== See also ==
- List of Oregon ballot measures
