= 1996 Oregon Ballot Measure 25 =

Oregon state legislation

Ballot Measure 25 of 1996 was a piece of direct legislation in the U.S. state of Oregon. The measure, which was successful, requires a three-fifths supermajority in both houses of the Oregon Legislative Assembly for any revenue-raising legislation.

Results by county: Yes: 50–60%; 60–70%; 70–80%; No: 50–60%

== See also ==
- Oregon Ballot Measures 47 (1996) and 50 (1997), which established a different supermajority requirement
- List of Oregon ballot measures
