= 2008 Oregon elections =

- November 4, 2008

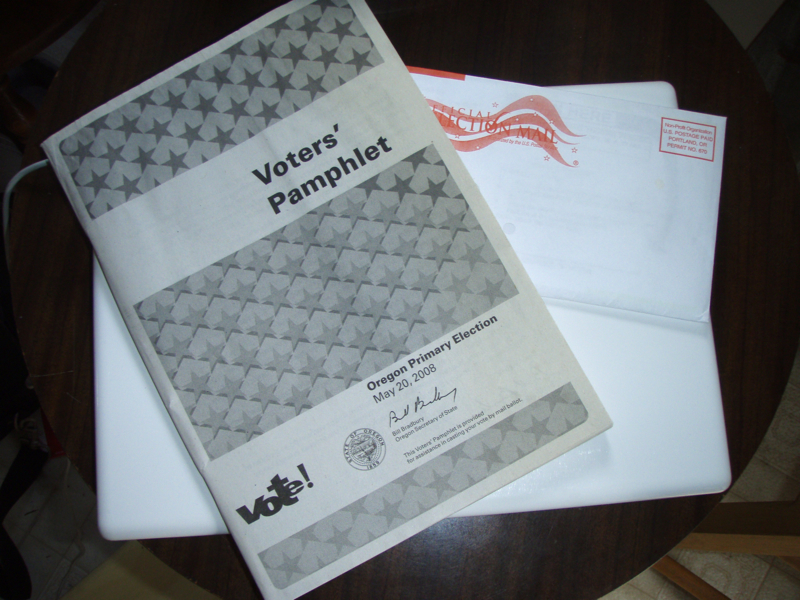
Oregon's elections are conducted by mail, and are preceded by a mailing of a Voters' Pamphlet like the one pictured here.

On November 4, 2008, the U.S. state of Oregon held statewide general elections for three statewide offices (secretary of state, treasurer, and attorney general), both houses of the Oregon Legislative Assembly, and twelve state ballot measures. The primary elections were held on May 20, 2008. Both elections also included national races for President of the US, US Senator, and US House Representatives. Numerous local jurisdictions — cities, counties, and regional government entities — held elections for various local offices and ballot measures on these days as well.

== Candidates for statewide offices ==
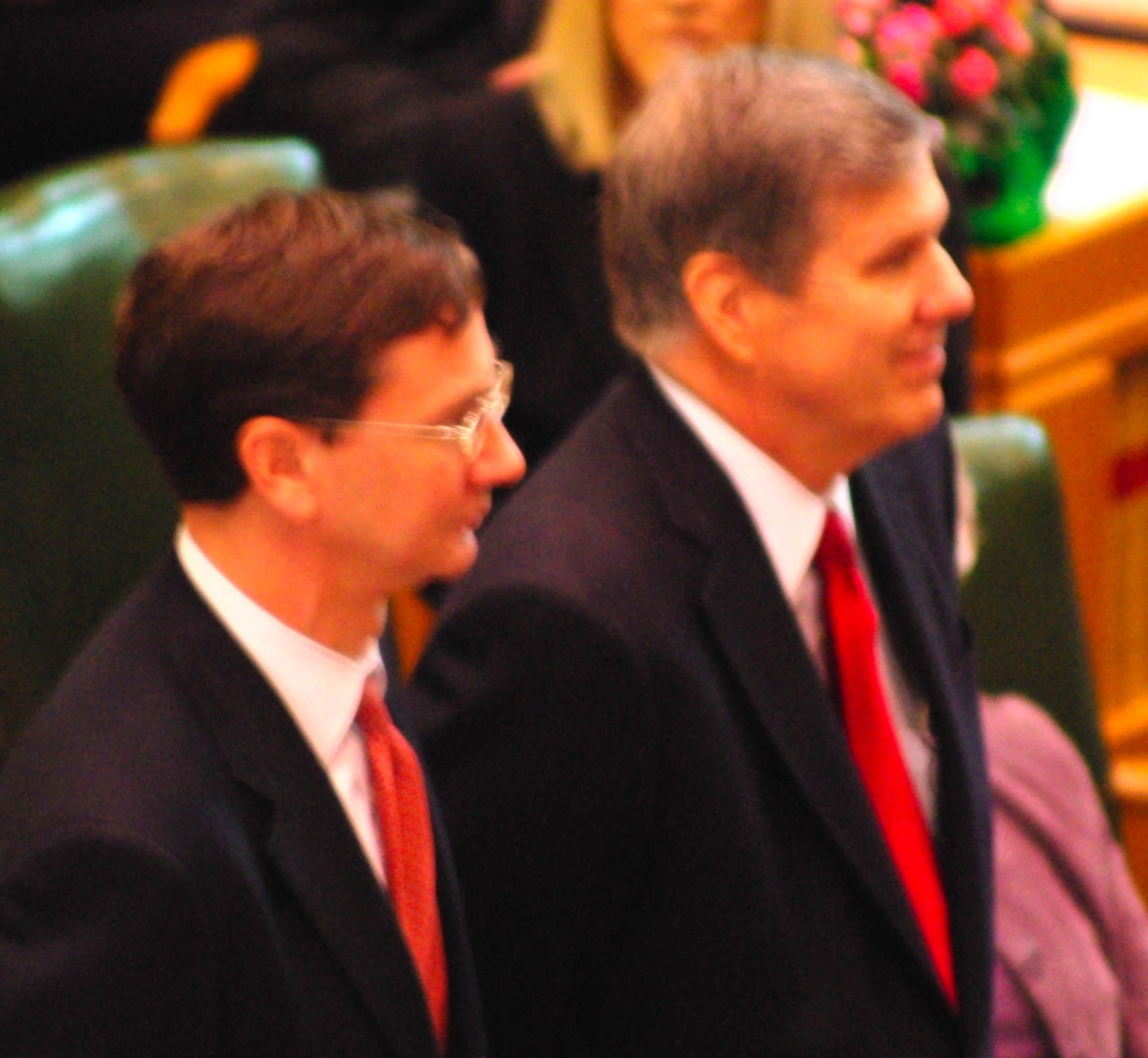
John Kroger (left) and Ben Westlund arriving at the 2009 State of the State address

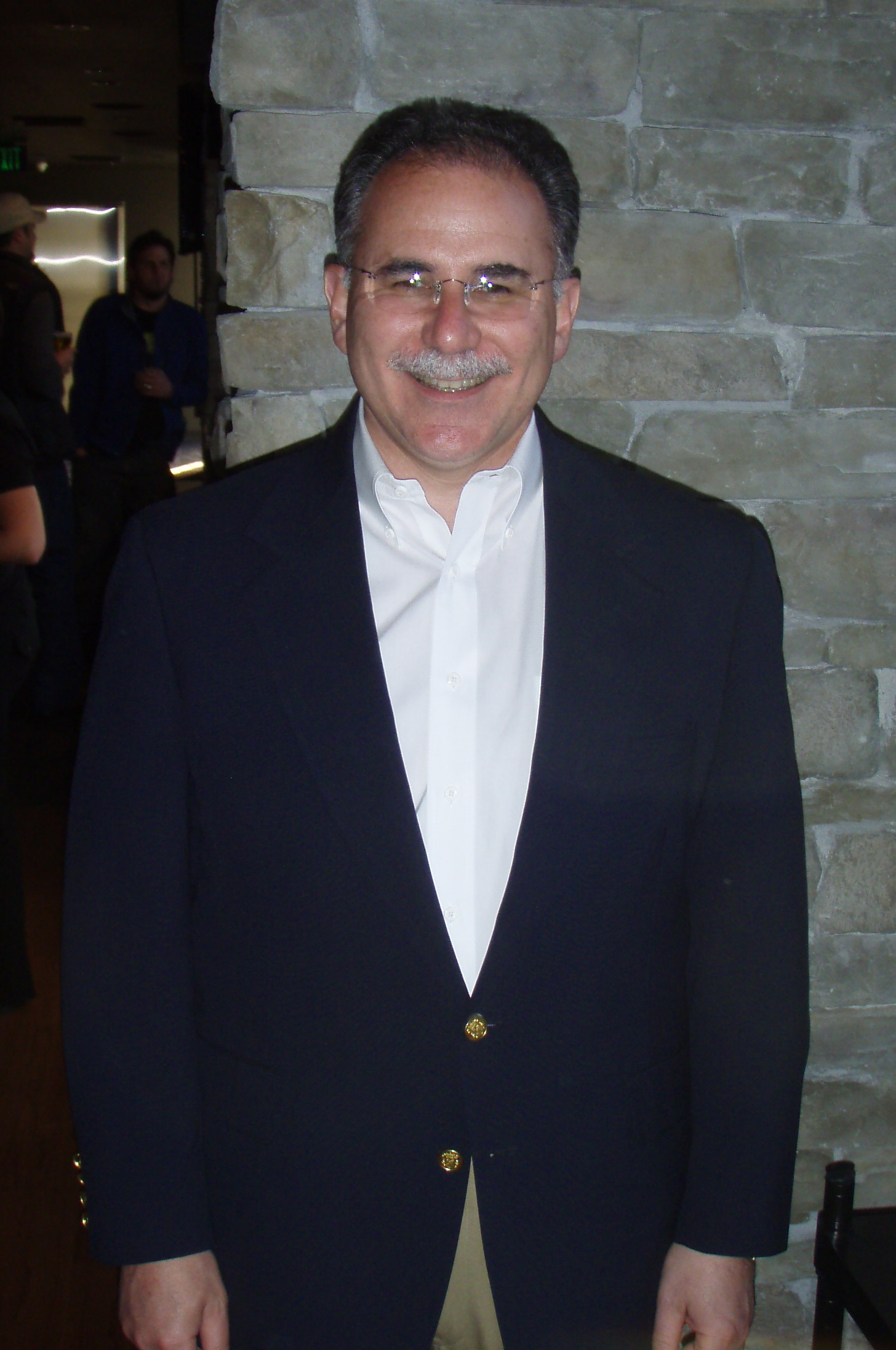
Allen Alley, candidate for State Treasurer

Democrat Kate Brown won the election for Secretary of State. She defeated Rick Metsger, Vicki Walker, and Paul Damian Wells in the Democratic primary. She then won the general election, in which she faced Republican Rick Dancer (who was unopposed in the Republican primary) and Pacific Green Party nominee Seth Alan Woolley.

Democrat Ben Westlund won the race for Treasurer. He and Republican Allen Alley were each unopposed in their respective primaries. Constitution Party nominee Michael Marsh was also on the November ballot.

Democrat John Kroger was elected Attorney General. He won the Democratic nomination over Greg Macpherson. Kroger also won the Republican nomination since no Republican filed and the most write-in votes—2,885—were for him. Three minor party candidates were also on the November ballot: J Ashlee Albies (Oregon Working Families Party), Walter F. Brown (Pacific Green Party), and James E. Leuenberger (Constitution Party of Oregon).

Brad Avakian, who was appointed Oregon Commissioner of Labor and Industries in spring 2008, defeated two opponents in his campaign to retain that seat: Pavel Goberman and Mark Welyczko. The position is non-partisan.

Oregon Supreme Court Associate Justice Martha Walters won reelection, with no opponent. Oregon Court of Appeals judge Timothy Sercombe did as well.

== State legislature ==
The Democratic Party of Oregon gained five seats in the Oregon House of Representatives, while the Oregon Republican Party gained one seat in the state Senate, the one Democrat Ben Westlund vacated to run for state treasurer. Going into the 2009 legislative session, Democrats will have a 36-member majority in the 60-seat House, and an 18-member majority in the 30-seat Senate. These three-fifths majorities give Democrats exactly the number of votes in each house needed to pass any bills that raise revenue, due to the supermajority requirement in Article IV §25 of Oregon's constitution.

Of the 60 races for the House, 39 had both Democratic and Republican candidates; 24 of those were in districts previously represented by Republicans, 15 in districts previously represented by Democrats. Sixteen Democrats had no Republican opponent, and five Republicans had no Democratic opponent.

Sixteen of the Senate's 30 seats were up for election. Fifteen are typically slated for general election, but Brad Avakian's seat was opened up when he was appointed state labor commissioner. Nine of the districts were previously held by Democrats, of which four races were contested; seven were currently held by Republicans, of which four were contested.

== Ballot measures ==
Oregonian voters decided on 15 statewide ballot measures in 2008, Measures 51 through 65.

=== May ===
In the May primary election, all three statewide ballot measures, 51, 52, and 53, passed. Measures 51 and 52 amended the Oregon Constitution with regard to crime victims' rights; Measure 53 also amended the state Constitution to modify the limits on property forfeited in criminal cases. All three were legislative referrals.

Measures 51 and 52 passed by wide margins, but Measure 53 was extremely close and required a hand recount; it eventually passed with a final official count of 50.03% to 49.97%.

==== Measure 51 ====
Amends constitution: Enables crime victims to enforce existing constitutional rights in prosecutions, delinquency proceedings; authorizes implementing legislation.

Measure 51
Choice	Votes	%
For	744,195	74.92
Against	249,143	25.08
Total	993,338	100.00
Registered voters/turnout		58.3

==== Measure 52 ====
Amends constitution: Enables crime victims to enforce existing constitutional rights in prosecutions, delinquency proceedings; authorizes implementing legislation.

Measure 52
Choice	Votes	%
For	738,092	74.87
Against	247,738	25.13
Total	985,830	100.00
Registered voters/turnout		58.3

==== Measure 53 ====
Amends constitution: Modifies provisions governing civil forfeitures related to crimes; permits use of proceeds by law enforcement.

Measure 53
Choice	Votes	%
For	490,158	50.03
Against	489,477	49.97
Total	979,635	100.00
Registered voters/turnout		58.3

=== November ===
In November 2008, voters considered eight initiatives, 58 through 65, and four legislative referrals, 54 through 57. Measures 54, 55, 56, and 62 were amendments to the Oregon Constitution. The four referrals all passed, and the initiatives all failed.

Detailed information on these measures and official results are available from the Oregon Secretary of State Elections Division.

==== Measure 54 ====
Amends constitution: Standardized voting eligibility for school board elections with other state and local elections. Repealed the unenforceable state constitutional provision that only people 21 years of age or older can vote in school board elections.

Measure 54
Choice	Votes	%
For	1,194,173	72.59
Against	450,979	27.41
Total	1,645,152	100.00
Registered voters/turnout		85.7

==== Measure 55 ====
Amends constitution: Changes operative date of redistricting plans; allows affected legislators to finish term in original district.

Measure 55
Choice	Votes	%
For	1,251,478	77.42
Against	364,993	22.58
Total	1,616,471	100.00
Registered voters/turnout		85.7

==== Measure 56 ====
Amends constitution: Provides that May and November property tax elections are decided by majority of voters voting. Repealed the "double majority" rule for these elections enacted by Measure 47 in 1996.

Measure 56
Choice	Votes	%
For	959,118	56.60
Against	735,500	43.40
Total	1,694,618	100.00
Registered voters/turnout		85.7

==== Measure 57 ====
Increases sentences for drug trafficking, theft against elderly and specified repeat property and identity theft crimes; requires addiction treatment for certain offenders.

Measure 57
Choice	Votes	%
For	1,058,955	61.39
Against	665,942	38.61
Total	1,724,897	100.00
Registered voters/turnout		85.7

==== Measure 58 ====
Prohibits teaching public school student in language other than English for more than two years.

Measure 58
Choice	Votes	%
For	756,903	43.64
Against	977,696	56.36
Total	1,734,599	100.00
Registered voters/turnout		85.7

==== Measure 59 ====
Creates an unlimited deduction for federal income taxes on individual taxpayers' Oregon income-tax returns.

Measure 59
Choice	Votes	%
For	615,894	36.22
Against	1,084,422	63.78
Total	1,700,316	100.00
Registered voters/turnout		85.7

==== Measure 60 ====
Teacher "classroom performance," not seniority, determines pay raises; "most qualified" teachers retained, regardless of seniority.

Measure 60
Choice	Votes	%
For	673,296	38.61
Against	1,070,682	61.39
Total	1,743,978	100.00
Registered voters/turnout		85.7

==== Measure 61 ====
Creates mandatory minimum prison sentences for certain theft, identity theft, forgery, drug, and burglary crimes.

Measure 61
Choice	Votes	%
For	848,901	48.90
Against	887,165	51.10
Total	1,736,066	100.00
Registered voters/turnout		85.7

==== Measure 62 ====
Amends constitution: Allocates 15% of lottery proceeds to public safety fund for crime prevention, investigation, prosecution.

Measure 62
Choice	Votes	%
For	674,428	39.44
Against	1,035,756	60.56
Total	1,710,184	100.00
Registered voters/turnout		85.7

==== Measure 63 ====
Exempts specified property owners from building permit requirements for improvements valued at/under 35,000 dollars.

Measure 63
Choice	Votes	%
For	784,376	45.79
Against	928,721	54.21
Total	1,713,097	100.00
Registered voters/turnout		85.7

==== Measure 64 ====
Penalizes person, entity for using funds collected with "public resource" (defined) for "political purpose" (defined).

Measure 64
Choice	Votes	%
For	835,563	49.44
Against	854,327	50.56
Total	1,689,890	100.00
Registered voters/turnout		85.7

==== Measure 65 ====
Changes general election nomination processes for major/minor party, independent candidates for most partisan offices. Would have created a blanket primary.

Measure 65
Choice	Votes	%
For	553,640	34.09
Against	1,070,580	65.91
Total	1,624,220	100.00
Registered voters/turnout		85.7

=== Citizens' Initiative Review of 58 ===
Healthy Democracy organized a trial run of the Citizens' Initiative Review process they advocated in September on Ballot measure 58. They brought together a representative cross-section of voters as a citizens' jury to question and hear from advocates, and experts on language education. The panelists then deliberated and reflected together to come up with statements in support (9 panelists) and opposed to (14 panelists) the measure, which are available online and were read out by the panelists at a press conference. Health Democracy advocated for the state to organize such a review of each ballot measure, and include the statements in the voters' pamphlet. '"It was exhausting, but it was exciting to have a group of people with hugely diverse backgrounds and experience listening carefully to both sides and all respectful to one another," said Lorene Wallick'

== See also ==
- Seventy-fourth Oregon Legislative Assembly
