= Oregon Ballot Measures 47 and 50 =

Ballot measures in Oregon modifying property tax assessment

Ballot Measure 47 was an initiative in the U.S. state of Oregon that passed in 1996, affecting the assessment of property taxes and instituting a double majority provision for tax legislation. Measure 50 was a revised version of the law, which also passed, after being referred to the voters by the 1997 state legislature.

Measure 47, sometimes referred to as a "cut and cap" law, reduced property taxes to the lesser of the 1994–95 tax or the 1995–96 tax minus 10 percent and limited future increases in assessed property values, except for new construction or additions, to 3 percent per year. It also instituted a "double majority" rule requiring at least a 50-percent voter turnout for all local tax measures in most elections (partially repealed in 2008 by Measure 56). It strengthened state constitutional limits, first imposed by Measure 5, on property taxes on real estate.

Measure 47 was placed on the ballot by initiative petition by anti-tax activist Bill Sizemore and approved by voters in the November 1996 general election, with 704,554 votes in favor and 642,613 votes against.

The law enacted by Measure 47 was amended in 1997, when the Oregon Legislative Assembly referred Measure 50 to voters to clarify that Measure 47 was intended to limit increases in real-estate assessments to 3 percent per year. The measure passed.

== Measure 47 ==
Results by county: Yes: 50–60%; 60–70%; No: 50–60%; 60–70%

The measure was sponsored by Bill Sizemore and his Oregon Taxpayers United anti-tax group, as part of the Oregon tax revolt. Proponents were upset by rising property taxes, largely caused by increasing real-estate values in the Portland area. Proponents were concerned about levy elections when there was little awareness of issues and turnout was expected to be low. Under Oregon law, two regularly scheduled statewide elections, the primary election in May and the general election in November, are held in every even-numbered year. In addition, four regularly scheduled elections can be held at the local level every year. Beyond this, the legislature may call a special election at any time.

Opponents feared that reducing taxes would cause cuts to schools beyond those they blamed on Measure 5. Furthermore, they opposed the double majority rule, arguing it gave non-voters more political power than those willing to vote.

Confusion existed about the possible effects of Measure 47. Petitioners claimed that Measure 47 would cap the assessment of properties—the value of the property as determined by the county—to prevent taxes from being raised more than three percent annually. Others claimed that Measure 47 did not prevent such an action. Sizemore placed an argument in the Oregon voters' guide in an attempt to clarify the measure's provisions. Nonetheless, the legislature sent Measure 50 to voters the next year to clarify that the cap applied to the assessed value of the property as well.

=== Double majority rule ===
Measure 47 enacted Oregon's "double majority" rule, which placed an additional requirement on state and local tax levies. The rule applies to all elections besides general elections held in even-numbered years. For a levy initiative or referral to pass in other elections, not only do more voters have to vote "yes" than "no", but at least 50 percent of registered voters must vote in the election. The double majority is a type of supermajority similar to an absolute majority.

In the U.S., general elections include presidential elections, held in even-numbered years once every four years on Election Day, the Tuesday after the first Monday in November. General elections also include midterm elections in which members of Congress, state legislators, and some state governors are chosen on Election Day in the years midway between presidential elections.

Since the passage of Measure 47, the double majority requirement has caused the defeat of many proposed local tax levies. According to the League of Oregon Cities, between 1997 and 2007 of the 1,358 total tax measures on ballots in the state, 616 passed and 742 failed, and 169 of those failures resulted from the double majority rule. In response, local governments generally prefer placing such measures on general-election ballots.

The measure also led to attempts to clean up the voter registration rolls. Registered voters who had died or moved away were being counted as "No" votes with the double majority requirement. (By law, Oregon ballot measures are worded so that "No" means "no change" and "Yes" means "adopt the measure.")

In 1998, Measure 53 sought to reverse the double majority provision but won only 49 percent of the vote.

In 2007, activists representing schools, the public employee union, and business interests lobbied the Oregon Legislative Assembly to scale back the requirement, and by June 2007 both houses of the legislature had approved House Joint Resolution 15, putting a measure before the voters on the November 2008 ballot. This measure appeared as Measure 56, and would exempt elections held in May and November of any year from the double majority requirement. It was later passed by voters on November 4, 2008. Proponents of the measure called the double majority rule undemocratic because, in their view, the rule gave non-voters unfair influence in the democratic process by allowing them to make measures fail that otherwise won support among the majority of those who actually voted. They also argued that because of Oregon's exclusive vote-by-mail voting system, which makes it more convenient to vote, there is no reason for people not to vote. Opponents considered unfair the idea that a small percentage of people could impose new taxes on others. They argued that the double majority rule was necessary to keep this from happening, and claimed that if it were repealed, taxes would rise too much.

== Measure 50 ==
Results by county: Yes: 50–60%; 60–70%; No: 50–60%

Measure 50 was sent to the voters by the Oregon Legislature in 1997. Once passed by the voters, the measure replaced Measure 47. The problems with Measure 47 that Measure 50 aimed to address included a lack of precision about the assessment of property taxes, unintended consequences, and vulnerability to legal challenges.

Measure 50 was approved by voters in the May 20, 1997 special election, with 429,943 votes in favor, and 341,781 votes against.

After the passage of Measure 47, as part of the ongoing anti-tax movement in Oregon, there was some confusion as to how the measure would be interpreted by the courts. One interpretation had the ballot measure reducing property tax revenues by $458 million in the fiscal year 1997–1998, while another interpretation, provided by the Oregon Attorney General, had it providing a reduction of only $270 million. Much of this disagreement had to do with what limitations Measure 47 would place on increases in the assessment of a property's value.

Measure 50 limited the adjustments in property tax assessments. Proponents argued that Measure 50 was necessary to avoid a lengthy legal battle as well as budget uncertainty about the possible effects of Measure 47. Opponents argued that Measure 50, rather than being a re-write of 47, was an attempt to water down the limitations imposed by Measure 47. Indeed, the estimated financial impact of Measure 50 was a $361 million reduction, rather than Measure 47's intended $458 million reduction.

== See also ==
- Oregon Ballot Measure 25 (1996), established a different supermajority requirement in the Legislature
- Oregon Ballot Measure 5 (1990)
- List of Oregon ballot measures
