= 2006 Oregon Ballot Measure 41 =

Measure 41
- Allows income tax deduction equal to Federal exemptions deduction to substitute for state exemption credit.

Results
Choice	Votes	%
Yes	483,443	37.13%
No	818,452	62.87%
Valid votes	1,301,895	100.00%
Invalid or blank votes	0	0.00%
Total votes	1,301,895	100.00%
- Results by county

Oregon ballot measure 41 was one of two unsuccessful ballot measures sponsored by the Taxpayers Association of Oregon (TAO) on the November 7, 2006 general election ballot. If passed it would have allowed a state income tax deduction equal to Federal exemptions deduction to substitute for state exemption credit on a person's state income tax filing.

== Background ==
To determine taxable income for federal personal income tax, taxpayers generally may claim deduction ($3,100 maximum in 2004) for each exemption; exemption exists for taxpayer, spouse, each dependent. For state income tax purposes, taxpayers currently may not claim deductions based on federal return's exemptions but may subtract exemption credit ($151 in 2004, multiplied by number of federally allowed exemptions) from state income tax liability. Measure 41 was an Initiated state statute ballot measure which would have authorized a deduction on state income tax return for each dependent, taxpayer, and spouse claimed as exemption on federal return. The deduction was stipulated that it shall be no less than total deduction for all exemptions on federal return. An exemption credit may have been substituted for the deduction if lower tax resulted. It would have reduced revenue available for state expenditures and provided no replacement revenue. It was similar to Ballot Measure 88, rejected in the general election of 2000.

=== Description of the Measure ===
Ballot Measure 41 would have changed how state income taxes are calculated. Currently, Oregon taxpayers may take a personal exemption tax credit ($154 for 2005) for each exemption allowed under federal tax law. Typically a taxpayer may take a credit for themself, a spouse and each dependent. A tax credit is a dollar-for-dollar reduction in the amount of taxes owed. This tax credit is adjusted for the cost of living each year.

The Measure would have given Oregon taxpayers the option of taking a tax deduction equal to the amount deducted on federal taxes. In contrast to a tax credit, a tax deduction is an amount that is subtracted from gross income to determine the amount of income that is subject to tax, or "taxable income." Currently, federal law allows taxpayers to take a deduction ($3,200 in 2005) for each personal exemption allowed under federal law. Typical exemptions are for the taxpayer, the spouse and dependents. The federal personal income exemption is adjusted for the cost of living each year.

This Measure would have permitted a taxpayer to claim either the new deduction created in this Measure or the existing personal exemption credit, if the existing credit would result in a lower tax for the taxpayer.

Existing federal law sets forth many exemptions from federal income tax that are unrelated to the deduction for personal exemptions. Measure 41 provided that the new state deduction shall not be less than the total amount of the deduction allowed for all exemptions on the taxpayer federal tax return but does not contain a definition of all exemptions.

The Measure stated that a repeal, delay in implementation or decrease in the amount of the deduction allowed would be subject to existing provisions of the Oregon Constitution requiring a supermajority vote for tax increases and prohibiting a bill regulating taxation or exemption from taking effect immediately following enactment through a declaration of an emergency.

The fiscal effect of the measure would have been a reduction of general fund revenue for a variety of state funded programs. The effect would have been greater each successive year because the federal deduction is indexed for inflation. Given as an example at the time the measure was purposed, if passed it would reduce tax revenue for 2006, and it may affect then-current departmental and agency budgets. A change in revenue may also have affected the 2007 personal kicker.

== Election results ==
Measure 41 was rejected, winning 37.1% of the vote (483,443 votes out of 1,301,895.)

TAO, the main organized support for the measure received 94% of its funding from Illinois-based Americans for Limited Government, which sponsored similar measures in numerous states in 2006. Opposing groups also pooled their resources in pushing for the defeat of both Measures 41 and 48, spending $1.9 million.

== See also ==
- List of Oregon ballot measures
- Loren Parks, major funder of Measure 41.
- Oregon Ballot Measure 48 (2006)
