= Oregon Ballot Measure 5 =

1990 referendum on property taxes

Ballot Measure 5 was a landmark piece of direct legislation in the U.S. state of Oregon in 1990. Measure 5, an amendment to the Oregon Constitution (Article XI, Section 11), established limits on Oregon's property taxes on real estate. Its primary champion and spokesman was Don McIntire, a politically-active Gresham health club owner who would go on to lead the Taxpayers Association of Oregon.

Property taxes dedicated for school funding were capped at $15 per $1,000 of real market value per year and gradually lowered to $5 per $1,000 per year. Property taxes for other purposes were capped at $10 per $1,000 per year. Thus, the total property tax rate would be 1.5% at the end of the five-year phase in period. The measure transferred the responsibility for school funding from local government to the state, to equalize funding.

The measure was passed in the November 6, 1990 general election with 574,833 votes in favor, 522,022 votes against (52% - 48%). It was and remains one of the most contentious ballot measures in Oregon election history.

== Results by county ==
Results by county Yes: 60–70% 50–60% No: 60–70% 50–60%

County	Yes	Votes	No	Votes	Total
Baker	40.00	2,358	60.00	3,537	5,895
Benton	41.82	12,180	58.18	16,946	29,126
Clackamas	58.90	68,976	41.10	48,122	117,098
Clatsop	50.27	6,380	49.73	6,311	12,691
Columbia	50.99	7,775	49.01	7,473	15,248
Coos	47.80	10,636	52.20	11,616	22,252
Crook	44.69	2,341	55.31	2,897	5,238
Curry	47.05	3,691	52.95	4,154	7,845
Deschutes	49.09	14,222	50.91	14,750	28,972
Douglas	47.11	15,946	52.89	17,903	33,849
Gilliam	41.55	354	58.45	498	852
Grant	37.90	1,183	62.10	1,938	3,121
Harney	40.65	1,171	59.35	1,710	2,881
Hood River	54.33	3,268	45.67	2,747	6,015
Jackson	51.09	28,164	48.91	26,959	55,123
Jefferson	44.93	1,927	55.07	2,362	4,289
Josephine	46.39	10,900	53.61	12,595	23,495
Klamath	44.78	8,969	55.22	11,062	20,031
Lake	40.54	1,236	59.46	1,813	3,049
Lane	47.52	51,441	52.48	56,809	108,250
Lincoln	53.27	8,493	46.73	7,449	15,942
Linn	53.69	18,143	46.31	15,648	33,791
Malheur	46.02	3,709	53.98	4,351	8,060
Marion	55.47	46,590	44.53	37,398	83,988
Morrow	32.63	852	67.37	1,718	2,550
Multnomah	55.08	130,020	44.92	106,041	236,061
Polk	52.07	10,479	47.93	9,646	20,125
Sherman	33.40	343	66.60	684	1,027
Tillamook	51.77	4,846	48.23	4,514	9,360
Umatilla	43.28	6,938	56.72	9,094	16,032
Union	44.33	3,908	55.67	4,908	8,816
Wallowa	38.92	1,257	61.08	1,973	3,230
Wasco	61.18	5,385	38.82	3,417	8,802
Washington	56.57	67,756	43.43	52,014	119,770
Wheeler	37.58	242	62.42	402	644
Yamhill	54.74	12,774	45.26	10,563	23,337

== Historical significance ==
Although measure numbers were recycled prior to the turn of the century, the effect of this measure on the state was significant enough that when Oregonians speak of Measure 5, they are usually referring to the specific measure that narrowly passed in 1990. Measure 5 is often seen as the beginning of the Oregon tax revolt. One effect of the measure was that funding for local schools was shifted from primarily local property tax funds to state funds. With this, it led to a general equalization of funding between districts as funds are now given to districts based on the number of students in each district. Schools with higher value property in their districts previously could fund local schools at a higher rate than more economically depressed areas.

Passage of the measure and the limits led to some discussion of eliminating county services in Multnomah County by combining them with Portland city services or Metro. It also led to talks of merging Multnomah, Washington, and Clackamas counties into one large urban county for the Portland metro area.

== Lasting effects and subsequent legislation ==
The measure has remained controversial ever since its passage. Oregon remains one of only five states without a state-level sales tax, the others being Alaska, Delaware, Montana, and New Hampshire. Furthermore, the measure is blamed for cuts in school programs, the budget crises of 2002 and 2003 and cuts to statewide public safety programs, including deep cuts to the Oregon State Police which never fully recovered from 50% staffing reductions. Many critics say that then-Governor Barbara Roberts' warning that Measure 5's passage would lead to massive chaos has been borne out. Supporters defend the measure as necessary to curb government spending excesses.

Measure 5 was followed up with Measure 47 in 1996 and Measure 50 in 1997. Measure 47 limited the growth of a property's assessed value to 3% maximum per year to combat local governments' raising assessed values to make up the difference in the rate they could charge. Measure 50 clarified that measure.

== See also ==
- 1978 California Proposition 13
