= 2008 Oregon Ballot Measure 58 =

Measure 58
- Prohibits teaching public school student in language other than English for more than two years.

Results
Choice	Votes	%
Yes	756,903	43.64%
No	977,696	56.36%
Total votes	1,734,599	100.00%
Registered voters/turnout		85.7%
- Results by county Yes 50%-60% 60%-70% No 50%-60% 60%-70% 70%-80%

Oregon Ballot Measure 58 was an initiated state statute ballot measure sponsored by Bill Sizemore that appeared on the November 4, 2008 general election ballot in Oregon. It was rejected by voters.

The initiative would have required "English immersion" in Oregon's public schools. "English immersion" wasn't defined in the measure, and there is no academic consensus as to what it means.

Vote tallies by county:

County	No	Votes	Yes	Votes	Total
Baker	45.06	3,802	54.94	4,635	8,455
Benton	65.05	28,603	34.95	15,365	43,968
Clackamas	53.97	97,993	46.03	83,570	181,563
Clatsop	54.33	9,508	45.67	7,994	17,502
Columbia	49.57	11,784	50.43	11,987	23,771
Coos	50.10	14,974	49.90	14,916	29,890
Crook	42.48	4,242	57.52	5,743	9,985
Curry	45.23	5,335	54.77	6,461	11,796
Deschutes	51.61	38,909	48.39	36,475	75,384
Douglas	45.97	23,165	54.03	27,224	50,389
Gilliam	46.21	494	53.79	575	1,069
Grant	43.59	1,625	56.41	2,103	3,728
Harney	42.28	1,496	57.72	2,042	3,538
Hood River	59.71	5,557	40.29	3,750	9,307
Jackson	53.35	51,224	46.65	44,788	96,012
Jefferson	46.97	3,769	53.03	4,256	8,025
Josephine	47.90	19,078	52.10	20,752	39,830
Klamath	41.47	11,726	58.53	16,618	28,344
Lake	40.62	1,430	59.38	2,090	3,520
Lane	60.38	105,067	39.62	68,933	174,000
Lincoln	54.17	12,404	45.83	10,496	22,900
Linn	46.28	22,942	53.72	26,627	49,569
Malheur	35.19	3,535	64.81	6,511	10,046
Marion	46.98	56,194	53.02	63,425	119,619
Morrow	39.90	1,563	60.10	2,354	3,917
Multnomah	71.36	244,781	28.64	98,224	343,005
Polk	48.57	16,753	51.43	17,738	34,491
Sherman	46.67	462	53.33	528	990
Tillamook	51.56	6,559	48.44	6,163	12,722
Umatilla	42.01	10,270	57.99	14,174	24,444
Union	49.41	5,937	50.59	6,078	12,015
Wallowa	45.98	1,932	54.02	2,270	4,202
Wasco	52.93	5,734	47.07	5,100	10,834
Washington	57.32	127,893	42.68	95,215	223,108
Wheeler	47.19	369	52.81	413	782
Yamhill	49.14	20,587	50.86	21,310	41,897

== Newspaper Endorsements ==
Here is how Oregon's major newspapers endorsed on the measure:

Newspapers	Yes	No
The Oregonian		No
Medford Mail-Tribune		No
Statesman Journal		No
Bend Bulletin		No
Portland Tribune		No
Eugene Register-Guard		No
Daily Astorian		No
East Oregonian		No
Corvallis Gazette Times		No
Coos Bay The World		No
Willamette Week		No
Yamhill Valley News Register		No
Gresham Outlook		No

No Oregon newspapers have endorsed a yes vote on Measure 58.

== Specific provisions ==
The measure would limit the use of foreign language instruction in public schools to:

- 1 year for students in kindergarten to 4th grade.
- 1.5 years for 5th grade through 8th grade.
- 2 years for high school students.
- It would also prohibit ESL (English as a Second Language) teaching programs for longer than the mandated time.

=== Estimated fiscal impact ===
The state's Financial Estimate Committee prepares estimated fiscal impact statements for any ballot measures that will appear on the ballot. The estimate prepared by this committee for Measure 58 says:

- The measure will require additional local school spending of between $203 and $253 million in each of the first two years, based on considerations of what it would cost to bring students who currently speak a foreign language up to federal standards.
- The more conservative estimate offered by the Financial Estimate Committee is based on the experience in Arizona with a similar measure.

Chief petitioner Bill Sizemore disputed the state's financial estimate, and said the measure would save education money, contending that "these kids will learn English more quickly when they are required to do so.",

== Supporters ==
Measure 58's chief petitioners are Bill Sizemore, Alan Grosso, and Russ Walker.

The Oregon Voters' Pamphlet has arguments in favor from Oregonians For Immigration Reform, the Marion County Republican Party, FreedomWorks, and Sizemore's Oregon Taxpayers United.

=== Arguments for Measure 58 ===
Notable arguments that have been made in favor of Measure 58 include:

- If the measure passes, it will improve the education of Oregon's immigrant children because it will bring about "specialized, intensive English instruction".
- Current programs in Oregon to teach English to students who do not speak English as a first language are failing; as evidence, supporters of Measure 58 cite a 2007 Oregon Department of Education study that indicated that only 22 of the state's 129 school districts are meeting minimum standards in this area.
- Limited English proficiency (LEP) students in the state are funded at 150% the rate for regular students but this extra funding, supporters say, is not working. It isn't the money that is being spent that is the issue, they argue, but how the money is being spent.
- School districts don't have the incentive to move students out of the LEP category because the school districts get more money from the state education department for LEP students than for non-LEP students.

== Opponents ==
Measure 58 is opposed by the Parents and Teachers Know Better Coalition, which describes itself as "a broad coalition of parents, teachers, and school advocates who care about Oregon's students & schools." The Parents and Teachers Know Better campaign is part of the Defend Oregon Coalition, which opposes all five of the ballot initiatives on the November 4 ballot that are sponsored by Sizemore.

Members of the coalition include Stand for Children, Oregon PTA, United Way of the Mid-Willamette Valley, Oregon Education Association, American Federation of Teachers-Oregon, Oregon School Employees Association, and the Human Services Coalition of Oregon, among others.

=== Arguments against Measure 58 ===
Notable arguments that have been made against Ballot Measure 58 include:

- It offers a "one-size-fits-all" mandate that doesn't take into account the differences in students' ability to learn academic English.
- English acquisition researcher Jim Cummins at the University of Toronto it typically takes students five to seven years to acquire full mastery of a second language.
- It is too expensive.
- It doesn't define what it means by "English immersion".
- It doesn't make any exceptions for students with learning disabilities.
- It isn't based on any research on how students learn. Most language acquisition experts say it takes five to seven years for children to become proficient enough in a new language to meet academic requirements.
- It will ban popular dual-immersion programs.

=== Donors opposed to Measure 58 ===
Two campaign committees opposed to Measure 58 have registered. They are Defend Oregon and the Committee to Protect Local Control of Schools (CPLCS), led by Kevin Neely, who is also the treasurer of Defend Oregon.

CPLCS reports no significant financial activity as of September 29.

Defend Oregon, as a committee, fought seven different ballot measures in 2008, and supported two others. As a result, it is not possible to discern how much of its campaign warchest went specifically to defeat Measure 58. Altogether, the group has raised $9 million in 2008.

Major donations to the Defend Oregon group as of October 23 include:

- $5.2 million from the Oregon Education Association.
- $1.2 million from SEIU.
- $450,000, American Federation of Teachers
- $600,000, AFSCME.
- $100,000 from School Employees Exercising Democracy (SEED)
- $100,000 from the AFL-CIO.
- $50,000 from Oregon AFSCME Council 75.

== Citizens' Initiative Review - 9 for, 14 against ==
- A 23-member Oregon Citizens Initiative Review panel examined this ballot measure in-depth in September 2008. They spent five days listening to advocates for and against the measure, and independent experts on language education. In the end, 14 were opposed to the measure, and nine were in support, and both groups wrote up their recommendation. Final analysis and statement

== Path to the ballot ==
What became Oregon Ballot Measure 50 started out as Oregon Initiative Petition 19; it was originally approved for petition circulation on August 30, 2006.

The office of the Oregon Secretary of State announced on June 16, 2008 that its unofficial signature verification process showed that the initiative's supporters had turned in 83,248 valid signatures, versus a requirement of 82,769 signatures. This represented a validity rate of 66.88% calculated over the 124,476 signatures turned in.

A union-funded watchdog group asked the Oregon Secretary of State to conduct an investigation into how some signatures on the measure were collected. Bill Bradbury, the Secretary of State has said, ""...most all of the initiatives Oregon voters will decide this fall got there through practices that are now illegal. But those practices were legal at the time most of the signatures were submitted." The state Elections Division is currently investigating the claims.

=== Basic information ===
- Oregon Voters' Pamphlet for Measures includes Official Explanatory Statement and Financial Estimate Summary
- Full text of the initiative
- Certified ballot title letter from the Oregon Attorney General
- Letters received from Oregon residents during the ballot title designation period
- Citizens' Initiative Review Analysis and Statement

=== Supporters ===
- Bill Sizemore's official website

=== Opponents ===
- Campaign website for Parents And Teachers Know Better, the No on Measure 58 campaign
- Website for Defend Oregon
- "Vote No on 58" from the Oregon Education Association
