= Rick Dancer =

American journalist and politician (born 1959)

- Born: June 30, 1959 (age 67); Hillsboro, Oregon, USA
- Education: Pacific University
- Occupations: Journalist, politician
- Notable credit: KEZI anchor
- Spouse: Kathy
- Children: 2
- Website: http://rickdancer.com/

Rick Dancer (born June 29, 1959) is an American journalist and politician in the state of Montana. Born in the city of Hillsboro, he was a longtime anchor for KEZI television in Eugene. Among his other activities as anchor, he covered the Thurston High School shooting. He later left broadcasting to run as a Republican for Oregon Secretary of State, losing in the general election to Democrat Kate Brown in 2008.

== Early life ==
Rick Dancer was born on June 29, 1959, to Roy and Betty Dancer in Hillsboro, Oregon. He grew up there with three sisters and lived in Hillsboro for his first 24 years, graduating from Hillsboro High School in 1977. In high school he worked for the local Copeland Lumber store before attending college at Pacific University in neighboring Forest Grove. Dancer graduated with a Bachelor of Arts degree in communications from Pacific in 1983. In Hillsboro, he married Kathy at the United Methodist Church that same year, and they had two sons, Jess and Jake.

== Television ==
After college Dancer moved to the southern Oregon Coast in 1985 and was a reporter in Coquille and Coos Bay at KCBY. Dancer then moved to Eugene, Oregon, in 1987 and worked as a television reporter for KVAL-TV. After a few years he moved to KEZI in 1989, the ABC affiliate in Eugene and continued as a reporter until becoming an anchor a year later. In 1998, he was one of the first reporters to arrive at Thurston High School in Springfield after the shooting spree by Kip Kinkel. While covering the story he started to cry while on camera, which angered him, but led to additional interviews with students as they felt he cared about the students. In February 2008, he announced he was leaving KEZI in order to run for public office. In 2020 and 2021 his company Rick Dancer Media Service LLC took out $19,896 and $18,166 in PPP loans that were later forgiven.

== Political career ==
The day after leaving television, he official started his campaign for Oregon Secretary of State as a Republican. He won the primary unopposed and then faced Democratic state senator Kate Brown in the fall election. His campaign focused on advocating for converting the Secretary of State position into a non-partisan position, and also supported Ballot Measure 65 that would have created an open primary system. He ran on the premise of being an outsider having never been in office before, while Brown touted her experience in public office.

Dancer raised around $365,000 in his campaign through late October, compared to around $750,000 for Brown. The biggest of his contributions came from timber companies. Dancer pulled within six percentage points in polling in late October. Brown won the November general election defeating Dancer and Pacific Green Party candidate Seth Woolley. Dancer garnered 785,740 votes compared to 873,968 for Brown. Dancer was mentioned as a possible candidate to run for the Republican nomination for Governor of Oregon in 2010.

Dancer is part of a group of filmmakers who began production in 2010 on a documentary film about former U.S. Senator Mark O. Hatfield.

== Electoral history ==
2008 Oregon Secretary of State election
Party	Candidate	Votes	%
Democratic	Kate Brown	873,968	51.0
Republican	Rick Dancer	785,740	45.8
Pacific Green	Seth Alan Woolley	51,271	3.0
Write-in		2,740	0.2
Total votes		1,713,719	100%
