= Constitution Party of Oregon =

- Founded: 2000 (current iteration)
- Membership (2026): 3,736 (as of loss of minor party status)
- Ideology: Paleoconservatism; Social conservatism Economic liberalism
- Political position: Right-wing to far-right
- National affiliation: Constitution Party (2000–2006)
- Colors: Red, white and blue (national colors); Green

Website
- constitutionpartyoregon.net

The Constitution Party of Oregon is a minor political party in the U.S. state of Oregon.

A state party was first organized under this name in 1952, as the state chapter of the newly formed national Constitution Party. A new party was formed under this name in 2000 as an affiliate of the national Constitution Party, founded in 1991. It broke with the national party in 2006 over the issue of abortion.

In 2026, the party lost its recognized minor party status.

== History ==
The Constitution Party of Oregon was first formed in August 1952 by Louise Gronnert, Gladys Whelen, and Virgil Holland. Its history since then has not been continuous, though its goals have remained fairly consistent. Headquartered in Portland, its stated purpose was to advance and promote interest in the U.S. constitution in schools and elsewhere. Its plans took shape in 1956 when it announced a nominating convention for president and vice president of the United States. The party opposed socialism and did not field local candidates. It announced a convention date of August 4. The party's nominations were expected to depend on how many conservative Southern Democrats walked out of the Democratic convention that year.

The American Constitution Party of Oregon incorporated in 1974 in Hillsboro. It was affiliated with the National American Party, and it held a convention in Portland in 1976 to nominate Tom Anderson and Rufus Shackleford for the president and vice president, respectively, of the United States.

In 1996, Oregonian Herb Titus was the vice presidential nominee of the national Constitution Party, which was then known as the U.S. Taxpayers Party.

In 2000 the party was newly reformed. Its nominee won 31% of the vote in a state legislative race where the Republican Party did not nominate a candidate. By 2002, the party still had fewer than 1,000 registered voters. Also in 2002, party chairman Bob Eckstrom pledged support for Lon Mabon of the Oregon Citizens Alliance when the latter was jailed for contempt of court.

In 2006 the Constitution nominee for Governor of Oregon was former TV anchor Mary Starrett, who ran on an anti-abortion platform. The state party also voted to disaffiliate with the national Constitution Party due to differences over abortion policy. It broke with the national party in May 2006. Similar measures were taken by other state parties after the national party partially abandoned their anti-abortion, supporting it in the cases of rape, incest, or the life of the mother. The amendment argued that "...until the national Constitution Party resumes a principled, pro-life position – we, in Oregon, should separate ourselves and proceed as an independent state party." As of July 31, 2016, the Oregon party has not re affiliated to the national Constitution Party. Starrett drew 3.6% of the vote; this was perceived to be primarily at the expense of Republican nominee Ron Saxton, though he lost by a margin greater than Starrett's share of the vote. There was an effort to draft Starrett to run for president of the United States in 2008. There was also speculation she might run for the U.S. Senate in 2008, but she did not ultimately seek either office.

In 2008 the Constitution nominee for the U.S. Senate, Doug Brownlow, was expected to play a "spoiler" role in the contest between incumbent Gordon Smith and challenger Jeff Merkley. In that year, it also fielded candidates for the 4th Congressional District and the Oregon Attorney General, though the Oregon Republican Party sat those races out. Brownlow did ultimately draw more votes, 5.2%, than the margin between Smith and Merkley.

Members of the Constitution Party protested funding of abortions by the Oregon Health Plan in 2009.

In 2012 the Constitution Party of Oregon nominated Ron Paul for the U.S. presidency. Paul declined the nomination, because Oregon law would have prevented him from later being nominated by the Republican party had he accepted the nomination.

In 2016, many members of minor political parties in the state re-registered for the Republican or Democratic parties in order to vote in their presidential primaries. The Constitution Party was the only party whose members went more strongly for the Republican Party than the Democratic. (260–102)

On May 28, 2024, the party nominated Randall Terry for the 2024 presidential election.

In 2026, the Constitution Party and the We The People Party lost recognized minor party status in Oregon after failing to meet the minimum requirements for voter registration or electoral performance. This removed the party's legal ability to nominate candidates.

== See also ==
- Herb Titus, 1996 vice presidential candidate with Constitution Party; from Baker City, Oregon, and alumnus of University of Oregon
