= Oregon State Elections Division =

The Oregon State Elections Division (officially, Elections Division of the Office of the Secretary of State of Oregon) is the agency of the government of the U.S. state of Oregon which administers the state's election laws in cooperation with the chief election officers of each of its counties. It provides advice and assistance on electoral matters to the public, elected officials, candidates, and the media. It processes candidate filings for state offices, initiative and referendum petitions, campaign contribution and expenditure reports, and other election documents. Prior to each primary and general election, the division publishes and distributes the state Voters' Pamphlet. It also investigates allegations of election law violations.

== See also ==
- Oregon Secretary of State
