= Property tax revolt =

In the United States, a series of property tax revolts occurred in the form of laws passed at the state level in the late 1970s and 1980s. (These were not revolts in the sense of illegal disobedience of authority, but got the moniker because large numbers of voters became active opponents of the policies of incumbent governments.) These laws limited the amount of property tax that could be charged by municipalities.

Examples, continuing the trend of property tax limits into the 1990s:

- 1978 California Proposition 13 – Ballot initiative which capped property tax at 1% and yearly increases at 2%
- 1980 Massachusetts Proposition 2½ – Referendum limiting taxation
- 1981 - S7000A New York City property tax law
- 1982 Gallagher Amendment to the Colorado state constitution (repealed in 2020)
- 1990 - Oregon tax revolt began with Oregon Ballot Measure 5
- 1992 - Article X of the Colorado Constitution
- 1994 Michigan Proposal A
- 1996 and 1997 - Oregon Ballot Measures 47 and 50

Citizens for Tax Justice and Institute on Taxation and Economic Policy were formed in 1979 in response to the passage of 1978 California Proposition 13.

== See also ==
- Property tax abolition movement
- Tennessee Tax Revolt, an advocacy group founded in 2001
