= Circuit breaker (disambiguation) =

A circuit breaker is an automatic electrical switch.

Circuit breaker or circuit breakers may also refer to:

- Trading curb or circuit breaker, a stock market term
- Circuit breaker (property tax), a refund of property taxes to low-income households in the United States
- Richie Hawtin (born 1970) alias Circuit Breaker, an electronic musician and DJ
- "Circuit Breaker", a song from Röyksopp's album The Understanding
- Circuit breaker design pattern, a design pattern in programming
- Circuit Breakers (video game), a 1998 racing video game
- Circuit Breaker, a gadget blog on The Verge, an American technology news and media network
- Circuit Breaker, a fictional character and antagonist appearing in the Transformers comic books published by Marvel Comics.
- Circuit Breaker (DC Comics), a superhero in DC Comics
- Circuit Breaker, the name Singapore gave its partial lockdown during the COVID-19 pandemic, and subsequently adopted by other countries.
