= Property tax in the United States =

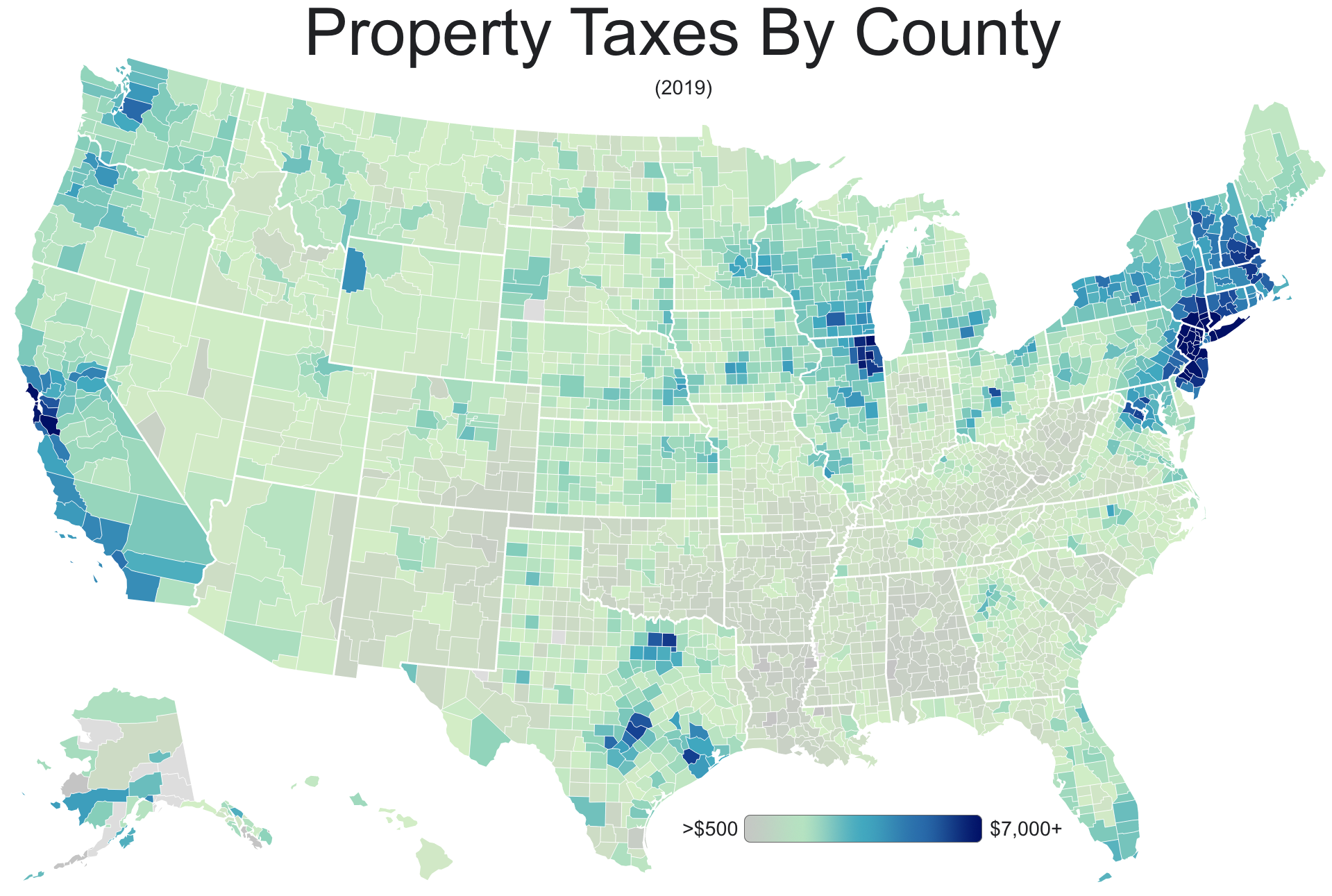
Median property tax paid by county -$500, $1,000, $2,000, $3,000, $4,000, $5,000, $6,000, $7,000+

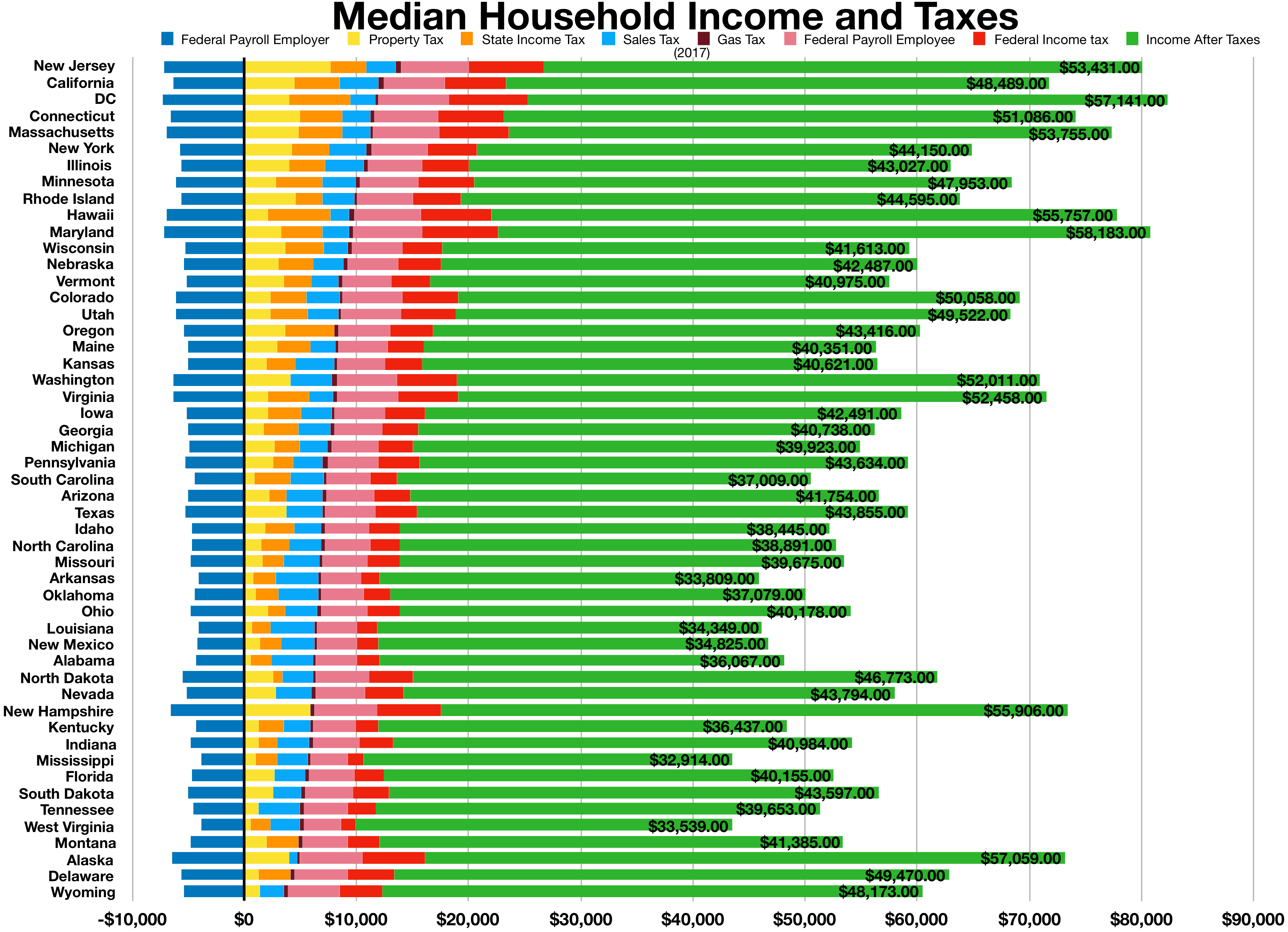
Median household income and taxes

Most local governments in the United States impose a property tax, also known as a millage rate, as a principal source of revenue. This tax may be imposed on real estate or personal property. The tax is nearly always computed as the estimated fair market value of the property, multiplied by an assessment ratio, multiplied by a tax rate. It is generally an obligation of the owner of the property. Local officials estimate values, which may then be disputed by property owners. For the taxing authority, one advantage of the property tax over the sales tax or income tax is that the revenue always equals the tax levy, unlike the other types of taxes. Property tax typically generates the revenue required to fund municipalities' tax levies. One disadvantage to the taxpayer is that the tax liability is fixed, while the taxpayer's income is not.

The tax is administered by the states, which delegate the task to their local governments. Many states impose limits on how local jurisdictions may tax property. Because many properties are subject to tax by more than one local jurisdiction, some states provide a method by which values are made uniform among such jurisdictions.

Property tax is rarely self-computed by the owner. The tax becomes a legally enforceable obligation that attaches to the property on a specific date. Most states impose taxes resembling property taxes, and some also tax other types of business property.

== Basics ==
Average Effective Property Tax of the 50 States (2007)
Income Percentile	Effective Property Tax (%)
Top 1%	0.70
95-99	2.10
80-95	2.70
60-80	2.80
40-60	2.70
20-40	2.70
0-20	3.60
The average effective property tax of the 50 states on a household (2007). The effective tax shown is calculated using a microsimulation model based on the 1990 Public Use Microdata Sample of census records and statistical data from the Internal Revenue Service for undisclosed years.

Most jurisdictions below the state level in the United States impose a tax on interests in real property (land, buildings, and permanent improvements) that are considered under state law to be ownership interests. Rules vary widely by jurisdiction. However, certain features are nearly universal. Some jurisdictions also tax some types of business personal property, particularly inventory and equipment. States generally do not impose property taxes.

Many overlapping jurisdictions may have the authority to tax the same property. These include counties or parishes, cities and/or towns, school districts, utility districts, and special taxing authorities which vary by state. Few states impose a tax on the value of property. The tax is based on fair market value of the subject property, and generally attaches to the property on a specific date. The owner of the property on that date is liable for the tax.

The amount of tax is determined annually based on the market value of each property on a particular date, and most jurisdictions require redeterminations of value periodically. The tax is computed as the determined market value multiplied by the assessment ratio and the tax rate. Assessment ratios and tax rates vary among jurisdictions, and may vary by type of property within a jurisdiction. Most jurisdictions' legislative bodies determine their assessment ratios and tax rates, though some states impose constraints on such determinations.

Tax assessors for taxing jurisdictions determine property values in various ways, but are generally required to base their determinations on fair market value. Fair market value is that price that a willing and informed seller would sell the property to a willing and informed buyer, neither being under any compulsion to act. Where a property has recently been sold between unrelated sellers, such a sale establishes fair market value. In other (i.e., most) cases, the value must be estimated. Common estimation techniques include the comparable sales method, the depreciated cost method, and the income method. Property owners may also declare a value, which is subject to change by the tax assessor.

Once the value is determined, the assessor typically notifies the last known property owner. Such notices may include the calculated tax amount. The property owner may then contest the value. Property values are generally subject to review by a board of review or similar body, before which a property owner may contest determinations.

After values are settled, property tax bills or notices are sent to property owners. Payment times and terms vary widely. If a property owner fails to pay the tax, the taxing jurisdiction has various collection remedies, including seizure and sale of the property. Property taxes constitute a lien on the property to which transferees are also subject.

== Property subject to tax ==
Nearly all property tax-imposing jurisdictions tax real property. This includes land, buildings, and all improvements (often called fixtures) that cannot be removed without damage to the property. Taxed property includes homes, farms, business premises, and most other real property. Many jurisdictions also tax certain types of other property used in a business. Property existing and located in the jurisdiction on a particular date is subject to this tax. This date is often January 1 of each year, but varies among jurisdictions. Property owned by educational, charitable, and religious organizations is usually exempt.

== Tax rates ==
Tax rates vary widely among jurisdictions. They are generally set by the taxing jurisdiction's governing body. The method of determining the rate varies widely, but may be constrained under laws of particular states. Property tax is likely the first or second highest tax burden on a capital-intensive business, so hundreds of thousands of dollars may be at stake. In some jurisdictions, property is taxed based on its classification. Classification is the grouping of properties based on similar use. Examples of classification are residential, commercial, industrial, vacant, and blighted real property. Property classifications are used to tax properties at different rates and for different public policy purposes. In Washington, D.C., for instance, property occupancy is incentivized by taxing residential property at 0.85 percent of assessed value, but vacant residential property at 5 percent.

=== Rate or millage ===
The rate of tax is a percentage of the assessed value of the property subject to tax. This, in some cases, is expressed as a "millage" or dollars of tax per thousand dollars of assessed value.

== Assessment ratio ==
Most jurisdictions impose the tax on a stated portion of the fair market value, known as the assessment ratio. This ratio may vary depending on the type or use of the property. In many jurisdictions, the assessment ratio can be changed from year to year by the governing body of the taxing jurisdiction. Changes in tax rate or assessment ratio may have the same practical effect as changing the net tax due on a particular property.

== Valuation ==
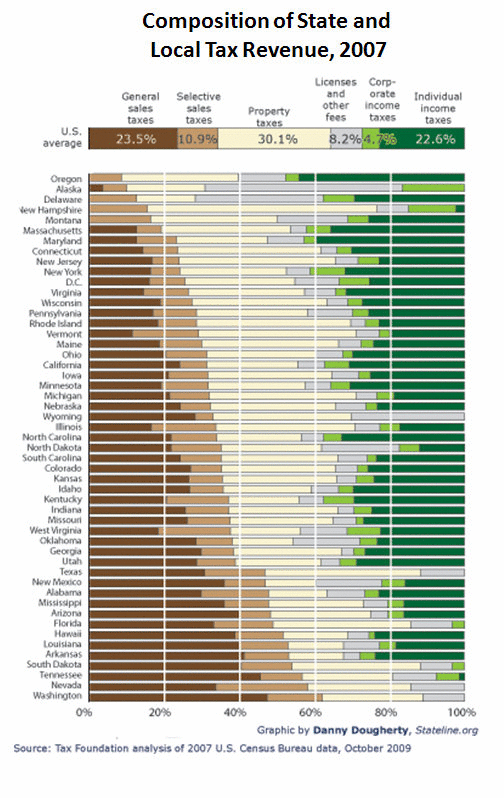
Composition of state and local tax revenues by sales taxes (brown), property taxes (white), licenses and other fees (grey), individual and corporate income taxes (green) in 2007.

Determining the value of property is a critical aspect of property taxation, as such value determines the amount of tax due. Various techniques may be used to determine value. Except in the case of recently sold property, valuation has inherently subjective aspects. Values may change over time, and many states require taxing jurisdictions to redetermine values every three or four years. The value of a property is often determined by its current use rather than its potential uses. Property values are determined at a particular valuation date for each jurisdiction, which varies widely.

=== Who determines value ===
Property owners may declare the value of their property to a taxing authority. This is often referred to as rendition. The taxing authority may accept this value or make its own determination of value. The value determinations are generally made by a tax assessor for the taxing authority. Some states require uniform values to be determined for each particular property.

=== Market value ===
Property values are generally based on the fair market value of the property on the valuation date. Fair market value has been defined as the price a willing and informed purchaser would pay to a willing and informed seller, where neither party is under compulsion to act. The sale of the particular property between unrelated persons generally conclusively establishes fair market value on the date of sale. Thus, a recent sale of the same property provides good evidence of market value. Where there has been no recent sale, other techniques must be used to determine market value.

=== Assessed value ===
Many jurisdictions impose tax on a value that is only a portion of the market value. This assessed value is the market value times an assessment ratio. Local taxing jurisdictions often set assessment ratios. However, some states impose constraints on the assessment ratios used by taxing jurisdictions within the state. Some such restrictions vary by type or use of property, and may vary by jurisdiction within the state. Some states impose restrictions on the rate at which assessed value may increase.

=== Equalization among jurisdictions ===
Many states require that multiple jurisdictions taxing the same property must use the same market value. Generally, such a state provides a board of equalization or similar body to determine values in cases of disputes between jurisdictions.

=== Valuation techniques ===
Tax assessors may use a variety of techniques for determining the value of property that was not recently sold. Determining which technique to use and how to apply it inherently involves judgment.

==== Comparable sales ====
Values may be determined based on recent sales of comparable properties. The value of most homes is usually determined based on sales of comparable homes in the immediate area. Valuation adjustments may be necessary to achieve comparability. Among the factors considered in determining if a property is comparable are:

- Nature of the property (house, office building, bare land, etc.)
- Location
- Size
- Use of the property (residential, commercial, farm, etc.)
- Nature of improvements
  - Types and uses of buildings
  - Features of the buildings (number of bedrooms, level of amenities, etc.)
  - Age of improvements
- Desirability of the property (view, proximity to schools, type of access, nearby detracting features, etc.)
- Restrictions on the property (easements, building code restrictions, physical restrictions, etc.)
- Utility of the property (fertility of land, drainage or lack thereof, environmental issues, etc.)
- General economic conditions

==== Cost ====
Where recent comparable property sales are not available, a cost-based approach may be used. In this approach, the original or replacement cost of a property is reduced by an allowance for decline in value (depreciation) of improvements. In some jurisdictions, the amount of depreciation may be limited by statute. Where the original cost is used, it may be adjusted for inflation or increases or decreases in the cost of constructing improvements. Estimates of construction costs may determine replacement cost.

==== Income ====
An alternative valuation for income-producing property may be based on economic concepts. Using the income approach, value is determined by the present value of the property's expected income streams. Selection of an appropriate discount rate in determining present values is a key judgmental factor influencing valuation under this approach.

=== Special use values ===
Most taxing jurisdictions provide that property used in any of several manners is subject to special valuation procedures. This is commonly applied to property used for farming, forestry, or other uses common in the jurisdiction. Some jurisdictions value property at its "highest and best use", with some of these providing exceptions for homes or agricultural land. Special valuation issues vary widely among jurisdictions.

=== Revaluation ===
All taxing jurisdictions recognize that property values may change over time. Thus, values must be redetermined periodically. Many states and localities require that the value of property be redetermined at three or four-year intervals. Such revaluation may follow valuation principles above, or may use mass valuation techniques.

=== Limits on increases ===
Some jurisdictions have set limits on how much property values may be increased from year to year for property tax purposes. These limits may be applied yearly or cumulatively, depending on the jurisdiction's rules.

== Assessment process ==
The assessment process varies widely by jurisdiction in terms of procedure and timing. In many states, the process of assessment and collection may be viewed as a two-year process, in which values are determined in the first year, and taxes are assessed and paid in the second. Most jurisdictions encourage property owners to declare the value of their property at the start of the assessment process. Property owners in all jurisdictions have the right to appeal determinations by taxing authorities, but those rights vary widely.

=== Valuation by assessor ===
Jurisdictions imposing property tax uniformly charge an official with determining the value of property subject to the jurisdiction's tax. This official may be an employee or contractor to the taxing government, and is generally referred to as the tax assessor in most jurisdictions. Some taxing jurisdictions may share a common tax assessor for some or all of the property within those jurisdictions, especially when the jurisdictions overlap.

=== Notification to owner ===
Following the determination of value, tax assessors are generally required to notify the property owner(s) of the value so determined. Procedures vary by jurisdiction. In Louisiana, no formal notice is required; instead, the assessor "opens" the books, allowing property owners to view the valuations. Texas and some other jurisdictions also require that the notice include very specific items, and such notice may cover multiple taxing jurisdictions. Some jurisdictions provide that notification is made by publishing a list of properties and values in a local newspaper.

In some jurisdictions, such notification is required only if the value increases by more than a certain percentage. In some jurisdictions, the notification of value may also constitute a tax bill or assessment. Generally, notification of the owner starts the limited period during which the owner may contest the value.

=== Review ===
Owners of property are nearly always entitled to discuss valuations with the tax assessor, and such discussions may result in changes in the assessor's valuation. Many jurisdictions provide for a review of value determinations. Such a review is often done by a board of review, often composed of residents of the jurisdiction who are not otherwise associated with the jurisdiction's government. In addition, some jurisdictions and some states provide for additional review bodies.

=== Protest ===
Nearly all jurisdictions provide for a mechanism for contesting the assessor's determination of value. Such mechanisms vary widely.

=== Judicial appeal ===
All jurisdictions levying property taxes must allow property owners to go to court to contest valuation and taxes. Procedures for such judicial appeal vary widely. Some jurisdictions prohibit judicial appeal until administrative appeals are exhausted. Some permit binding arbitration.

=== Levy of tax ===
Tax is levied at the tax rate and assessment ratio applicable for the year. Taxing jurisdictions levy tax on property following a preliminary or final determination of value. Property taxes in the United States generally are due only if the taxing jurisdiction has levied or billed the tax. The form of levy or billing varies, but is often accomplished by mailing a tax bill to the property owner or mortgage company.

== Exemptions and incentives ==
Taxing jurisdictions provide a wide variety of methods a property owner may use to reduce taxes. Nearly all jurisdictions provide a homestead exemption reducing the taxable value, and thus tax, of an owner-occupied home. Many provide additional exemptions for veterans. Taxing jurisdictions may also offer temporary or permanent full or partial exemptions from property taxes, often as an incentive for a particular business to locate its premises within the jurisdiction. Some jurisdictions provide broad exemptions from property taxes for businesses located within certain areas, such as enterprise zones.

The largest property tax exemption is for registered non-profit organizations; all 50 states fully exempt these organizations from state and local property taxes, with a 2009 study estimating the exemption's forgone tax revenues at $17–32 billion per year.

Exemptions can be quite substantial. In New York City alone, an Independent Budget Office study found that religious institutions would have been taxed $627M yearly without such exemptions; all exempt groups avoided paying a combined $13 billion in the fiscal year of 2012 (1 July 2011 to 30 June 2012).

== Payment ==
Time and manner of payment of property taxes vary widely. Property taxes in many jurisdictions are due in a single payment by January 1. Many jurisdictions provide for payment in multiple installments. In some jurisdictions, the first installment payment is based on the prior year's tax. Payment is generally required by cash or check delivered or mailed to the taxing jurisdiction.

== Liens and seizures ==
Property taxes generally attach to the property; that is, they become an encumbrance on the property which the current and future owners must satisfy. This attachment, or lien, generally happens automatically without further action of the taxing authority. The lien generally is removed automatically upon payment of the tax.

If the tax is not paid within a specified period of time (including additional interest, penalties, and costs), a tax sale is held, which may result in either 1) the actual sale of a property, or 2) a lien sold to a third party, who (after another specified period of time) may take action to claim the property, or force a later sale to redeem the lien.

== Attachment date ==
The tax lien attaches to the property at a specific date, generally the date the tax liability becomes enforceable. This date, known as the attachment date, varies by state, and in some states by local jurisdiction.

=== Delinquency ===
Where the property owner does not pay tax by the due date, the taxing authority may assess penalties and interest. The amount, timing, and procedures vary widely. Generally, the penalty and interest are enforceable in the same manner as the tax and attach to the property.

=== Seizure and sale ===
Where the property owner fails to pay tax, the taxing authority may act to enforce its lien. Enforcement procedures vary by state. In some states, the lien may be sold by the taxing authority to a third party, who can then attempt collection. In most states, the taxing authority can seize the property and offer it for sale, generally at a public auction. In some states, rights acquired in such a sale may be limited.

== Tax administrations ==
Property taxes are generally administered separately by each jurisdiction imposing property tax, though some jurisdictions may share a common property tax administration. Often, tax administration is conducted at the taxing jurisdiction's administrative offices (e.g., town hall). The form and organization vary widely.

=== Assessors ===
Most taxing jurisdictions refer to the official responsible for determining property values, assessing, and collecting property taxes as an assessor. Assessors may be elected, appointed, hired, or contracted, depending on rules within the jurisdiction, which may vary within a state. Assessors may or may not be involved in the collection of tax. The tax assessors in some states are required to pass certain certification examinations and/or have a certain minimum level of property valuation experience. Larger jurisdictions employ full-time personnel in the tax assessor's office, while small jurisdictions may engage only one part-time person for the entire tax assessor function.

== Constitutional limitations ==
Property taxes, like all taxes in the United States, are subject to constraints under the United States and applicable state constitutions. The United States Constitution contains three relevant provisions: limits on federal direct taxation, an equal protection rule, and the privileges and immunities provisions. Nearly all state constitutions impose uniformity and equality rules. Most state constitutions also impose other restrictions, which vary widely.

The federal government is generally prohibited from imposing direct taxes unless such taxes are then given to the states in proportion to population. Thus, ad valorem property taxes have not been imposed at the federal level.

The states must grant residents of other states equal protection as taxpayers.

=== Uniformity and equality ===
State constitutions constrain taxing authorities within the state, including local governments. Typically, these constitutions require that property taxes be assessed uniformly or equally. While many states allow differing tax rates among jurisdictions, most prohibit a single jurisdiction from applying different rates to different taxpayers. These provisions have generally been interpreted to mean that valuation and assessment methods must be consistent across local governments. Some state courts have held that this uniformity and equality requirement does not preclude the granting of individualized tax credits (such as exemptions and incentives). Some states permit different classes of property (as opposed to different classes of taxpayers) to be valued using different assessment ratios. In many states, the uniformity and equality provisions apply only to property taxes, leading to significant classification problems.

Many of these uniformity clauses emerged in the antebellum era, originating in the Southern United States. Historian Robin Einhorn argues that these clauses were designed to ensure that enslaved people were not taxed at a higher rate than other forms of property.

== History ==
Property taxes in the United States originated during colonial times. By 1796, state and local governments in fourteen of the fifteen states taxed land, but only four taxed inventory (stock in trade). Delaware did not tax property, but rather the income from it. In some states, "all property, with a few exceptions, was taxed; in others, specific objects were named. Land was taxed in one state by quantity, in another by quality, and in a third not at all. Responsibility for the assessment and collection of taxes in some cases attached to the state itself; in others, to the counties or townships." Vermont and North Carolina taxed land based on quantity, while New York and Rhode Island taxed land based on value. Connecticut taxed land based on type of use. Procedures varied widely.

During the period from 1796 until the Civil War, a unifying principle developed: "the taxation of all property, movable and immovable, visible and invisible, or real and personal, as we say in America, at one uniform rate." During this period, property taxes came to be assessed based on value. This was introduced as a requirement in many state constitutions.

After the Civil War, intangible property, including corporate stock, took on far greater importance. Taxing jurisdictions found it difficult to find and tax this sort of property. This trend led to the introduction of alternatives to the property tax (such as income and sales taxes) at the state level. Property taxes remained a major source of government revenue below the state level.

Hard times during the Great Depression led to high delinquency rates and reduced property tax revenues. Also during the 1900s, many jurisdictions began exempting certain property from taxes. Many jurisdictions exempted homes of war veterans. After World War II, some states replaced exemptions with "circuit breaker" provisions that limited increases in the value of residences.

Various economic factors have led to taxpayer initiatives in various states to limit property taxes. California Proposition 13 (1978) amended the California Constitution to limit aggregate property taxes to 1% of the "full cash value of such property." It also limited the increase in the assessed value of real property to an inflation factor of 2% per year.

== Opinions on property tax ==
=== Sprawl ===
In the absence of urban planning policies, property taxes on real estate alter incentives for land development, which in turn affect land use patterns. One of the main concerns is whether or not it encourages urban sprawl.

The market value of undeveloped real estate reflects a property's current use as well as its development potential. As a city expands, relatively cheap, undeveloped lands (such as farms, ranches, and private conservation parks) increase in value as neighboring areas are developed into retail, industrial, or residential uses. This raises land value, increasing the property tax on agricultural land, but does not increase the amount of revenue per unit of land area available to the owner. This, along with a higher sale price, increases the incentive to rent or sell agricultural land to developers. On the other hand, a property owner who develops a parcel must thereafter pay a higher tax, based on the value of the improvements. This makes the development less attractive than it would otherwise be. Overall, these effects result in lower-density development, which tends to increase sprawl.

Attempts to reduce the impact of property taxes on sprawl include:

- Land value taxation – This method separates the value of a given property into its actual components — land value and improvement value. A tax is levied at a gradually lower rate on the improvement value and at a higher rate on the land value to ensure revenue neutrality. A similar method is known as split-rate taxation.
- Current-use valuation - This method assesses the value of a given property based only upon its current use. Much like land value taxation, this reduces the effect of city encroachment.
- Conservation easements - The property owner adds a restriction to the property prohibiting future development. This effectively removes the development potential as a factor in the property taxes.
- Exemptions - Exempting favored classes of real estate (such as farms, ranches, cemeteries, or private conservation parks) from the property tax altogether or assessing their value at a minimal amount (for example, $1 per acre).
- Forcing higher density housing - In the Portland, Oregon area, for example, local municipalities are often forced to accept higher density housing with small lot sizes. This is governed by a multi-county development control board, in Portland's case Metro.
- Urban growth boundary or Green belt - Government declares some land undevelopable until a date in the future. This forces regional development back into the urban core, increasing density and land and housing prices. It may also cause development to skip the restricted-use zone, occur in more distant areas, or move to other cities.

=== Distributional ===
Some have argued that property taxes are broadly progressive, since people of higher incomes are disproportionately likely to own more valuable property. In addition, while nearly all households have some income, nearly a third of households own no real estate. Moreover, the most valuable properties are owned by corporations, not individuals. Hence, property is more unevenly distributed than income.

Others believe property taxes are regressive under certain circumstances, because of its impact on particular low-income/high-asset wealthy groups, such as pensioners and farmers. Because these persons have accumulated substantial assets over time, they have a high property tax liability, even though their income, if they are employed, is low. Therefore, a larger proportion of their income goes to paying the tax. In areas with speculative land appreciation (such as California in the 1970s and 2000s), there may be little or no relationship between property taxes due to home asset appreciation and a homeowner's ability to pay taxes for the home short of selling the property.

The issue of rising home values without rising cost-of-living incomes was a common argument used by supporters of such measures as California Proposition 13 or Oregon Ballot Measure 5; some economists have even called for the abolition of property taxes altogether, to be replaced by income taxes, consumption taxes such as Europe's VAT, or a combination of both.

It has been suggested that these two beliefs are not incompatible—namely, that a tax can be progressive overall yet regressive for asset-rich minority groups. Renters are subject to property taxes as well. The owner's cost of taxation is passed on to the renter (occupant) in order for landlords to make a profit. If the tax reduces the supply of housing units, then it will also increase the rental value and taxes. Advocates for land value taxes cite this as an advantage relative to property taxes, claiming that land taxes are not passed on to renters, except as part of profit, and are borne largely by the landowner.

==== Progressive policies ====
As property values increase, there is a risk that new buyers might pay taxes based on outdated values, placing an unfair burden on other property owners. To correct this imbalance, municipalities periodically revalue property. Revaluation produces an up-to-date value for determining the tax rate needed to achieve the required tax levy.

A consequence of this is that existing and new owners are reassessed and thus required to pay taxes on property whose value is determined by market forces, such as gentrification in low-income areas of a city. In an effort to alleviate the often heavy tax burdens on existing owners, particularly those with fixed incomes, such as older people and those who have lost their jobs, communities have introduced exemptions.

In some states, laws provide for exemptions (typically called homestead exemptions) and/or limits on the percentage increase in tax, which limit the yearly increase in property tax so that owner-occupants are not "taxed out of their homes". Generally, these exemptions and ceilings are available only to property owners who use their property as their principal residence. Homestead exemptions generally cannot be claimed on investment properties and second homes. When a homesteaded property changes ownership, the property tax often rises sharply, and the property's sale price may become the basis for new exemptions and limits available to the new owner-occupant.

Homestead exemptions increase the complexity of property tax collection and sometimes provide an easy opportunity for people who own several properties to benefit from tax credits to which they are not entitled. Since there is no national database that links home ownership with Social Security numbers, landlords sometimes gain homestead tax credits by claiming multiple properties in different states, and even their own state, as their "principal residence", while only one property is truly their residence. In 2005, several U.S. senators and representatives were found to have erroneously claimed "second homes" in the greater Washington, D.C. area as their "principal residences", giving them property tax credits to which they were not entitled.

Undeserved homestead exemption credits became so ubiquitous in the state of Maryland that a law was passed in the 2007 legislative session to require validation of principal residence status through the use of a social security number matching system. The bill passed unanimously in the Maryland House of Delegates and Senate and was signed into law by the Governor. The fairness of property tax collection and distribution is a hotly debated topic. Some people feel school systems would be more uniform if taxes were collected and distributed at the state level, thereby equalizing school district funding. Others are reluctant to have a higher level of government set the rates and allocations, preferring to leave such decisions to levels of government closer to the people.

In Rhode Island, efforts are being made to modify revaluation practices to preserve the major benefit of property taxation, the reliability of tax revenue, while providing for what some view as a correction of the unfair distribution of tax burdens on existing owners of property.

The Supreme Court has held that Congress can directly tax land ownership so long as the tax is apportioned among the states based upon representation/population. In an apportioned land tax, each state would have its own rate of taxation sufficient to raise its pro-rata share of the total revenue to be financed by a land tax. So, for example, if State A has 5% of the population, it would collect and remit to the federal government tax revenue equal to 5% of the revenue sought. Such an apportioned tax on land had been used on many occasions up through the Civil War.

Indirect taxes on the transfer of land are permitted without apportionment: in the past, this has taken the form of requiring revenue stamps to be affixed to deeds and mortgages. Still, these are no longer required by federal law. Under the Internal Revenue Code, the government realizes a substantial amount of revenue from income taxes on capital gains from the sale of land and in estate taxes from the passage of property (including land) upon the death of its owner.

Milton Friedman noted that "[T]he property tax is one of the least bad taxes, because it's levied on something that cannot be produced — that part that is levied on the land". A 2008 analysis from the Organisation for Economic Co-operation and Development was consistent with Friedman's opinion; examining the effect of various types of taxes on economic growth, it found that property taxes "seem[ed] to be the most growth-friendly, followed by consumption taxes and then by personal income taxes."

== See also ==
- Allodial title
- Council Tax, the UK equivalent of property tax
- Land patent
- Rates in the United Kingdom
- State tax levels in the United States
- Teeter Plan
- Wealth tax
