= S7000A New York City property tax =

New York City property tax law

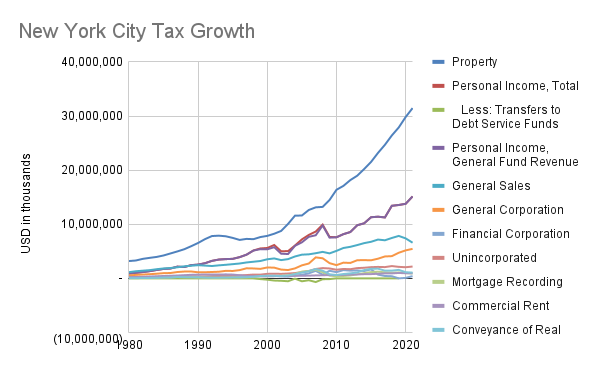
New York City Tax Growth Chart

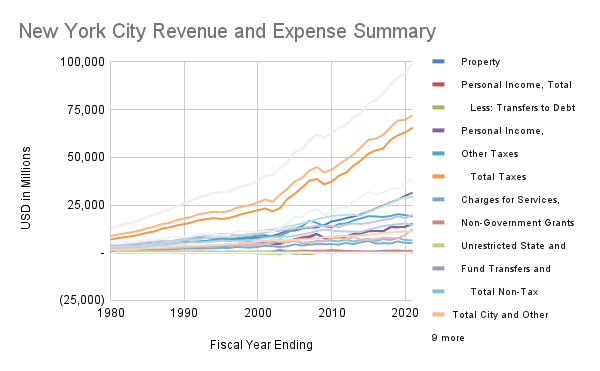
Based on New York City Independent Budget Office Summary

S.7000-A is the landmark New York State legislation from 1981 that established the current framework for New York City's property tax system, creating four property classes and implementing various assessment caps and rules that cause significant tax disparities. Also S.7000-A is the name given to the current dominant property tax law in effect in New York State affecting New York City. Surrounding areas such as Nassau County have similar laws. The bill was enacted in 1981 in response to the Hellerstein decision (Hellerstein v. Assessor of Islip, 37 N.Y.2d 1 (1975)). The law is embodied in Article 18 of the New York State Real Property Law.

The most significant portions of the law are the creation of tax classes, the limitation on assessment increases for small homes (1 to 3 family homes called Class 1) and for other residential property with 10 units or less (a subset of Class 2), the setting of an upper limit for the "assessed value" as a percentage of "market value" across the different tax classes, and the limitation on the increase allowed in the allocation of the tax levy across the different tax classes from the previous year's assessment roll.

== History ==
S.7000-A was a reaction to the Hellerstein decision (Hellerstein v. Assessor of Islip, 37 N.Y.2d 1 (1975)). There was discussion of a 100% re-assessment of all properties in New York State. A group called State Coalition Against 100% Re-Assessment (SCAR) fought for 5 years to stop 100% re-assessment of properties and eventually helped enact S.7000-A

There was much debate before S.7000-A was enacted. These are some of the quotes:

"The Hellerstein decision has thrown into complete chaos the entire basis on which New York City and New York State always raised tax revenue," said Assemblyman Brian Sharoff, Brooklyn Democrat in 1976. Brian Sharoff was chairman of the State Assembly Committee on Real Property Taxation at the time.

"It has threatened directly the middle‐class taxpayer with the possibility of increases of two or three times in taxes. There would be substantial dislocations in urban areas."

=== Before S.7000-A ===
Before the S.7000-A law was passed, New York State assessors typically used fractional assessments. Usually, properties were assessed when they were built and never reassessed. Over 100 years or more, this caused large discrepancies between older buildings assessed values and newer construction assessed values.

=== Assessment system found unconstitutional ===
On June 5, 1975, the New York State Court of Appeals ruled that the New York State's property tax assessment system violated the state constitution.

An initial attempt was made by an Albany New York Panel to assess all property at full valuation. The proposal was defeated by groups such as State Coalition Against 100% Re-Assessment (SCAR).

In order to bring the assessment law in compliance with the New York State Constitution, the New York State leadership proposed to set up two systems, one for New York City and Nassau County and one for the rest of the state.

The bill called S.7000-A was vetoed by then Governor Hugh Carey on November 11, 1981.

In a rare occurrence, the New York State Legislature overrode the Governor's veto on December 4, 1981.

== Key components of the law ==
=== Definitions ===
The key terms to understand in property tax law are "market value" and "assessed value". The property tax amount is a percentage of the property's assessed value. Sometimes, the assessed value and the market value are set by law to be the same value. When the assessed value is a percentage of the market value, this is called "fractional assessment". Market value is usually the amount for which the property can be sold in an arms length transaction. However, in New York State for only apartment houses, including cooperatives and condominiums the market value is not the amount for which the property can be sold. Instead, the market value is calculated by the New York City Department of Finance using a statistical model.

=== Setting the assessed value of a property ===
The assessed value of a property is calculated based on the property's "market value", an assessment ratio set annually by the New York City Department of Finance and the Nassau County Assessor, and certain assessment rules set by state law. New York City and Nassau County are legally obligated by RPTL section 738 and N.Y.C. Admin. Code § 11-212, among other provisions, to adjust the assessment ratio or level of assessment within each class to reflect the market, and to ensure that assessments are uniform within each tax class and that the resulting taxes are equalized.

=== Amendments ===
New York City Department of Finance has lowered the assessment ratio in the past to comply with the law's uniformity requirement. After the State Legislature enacted the current system in response to Hellerstein, the Class One assessment ratio was about 25%. It was lowered to 18% in 1985, and then to 12% in 1989. In 1992, the ratio was lowered to 8%, and then in 2004 to the current 6% ratio.

=== Setting the tax rate ===
The New York City Council and the Mayor of New York City set the actual tax rate for the various tax classes.

== Charts ==
Historical charts showing the effect of New York State Tax Law S7000A on property tax growth.

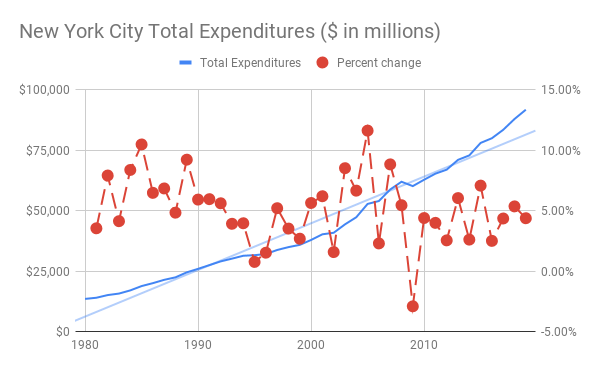
1980-2020 Total New York City Total Expenditures History.

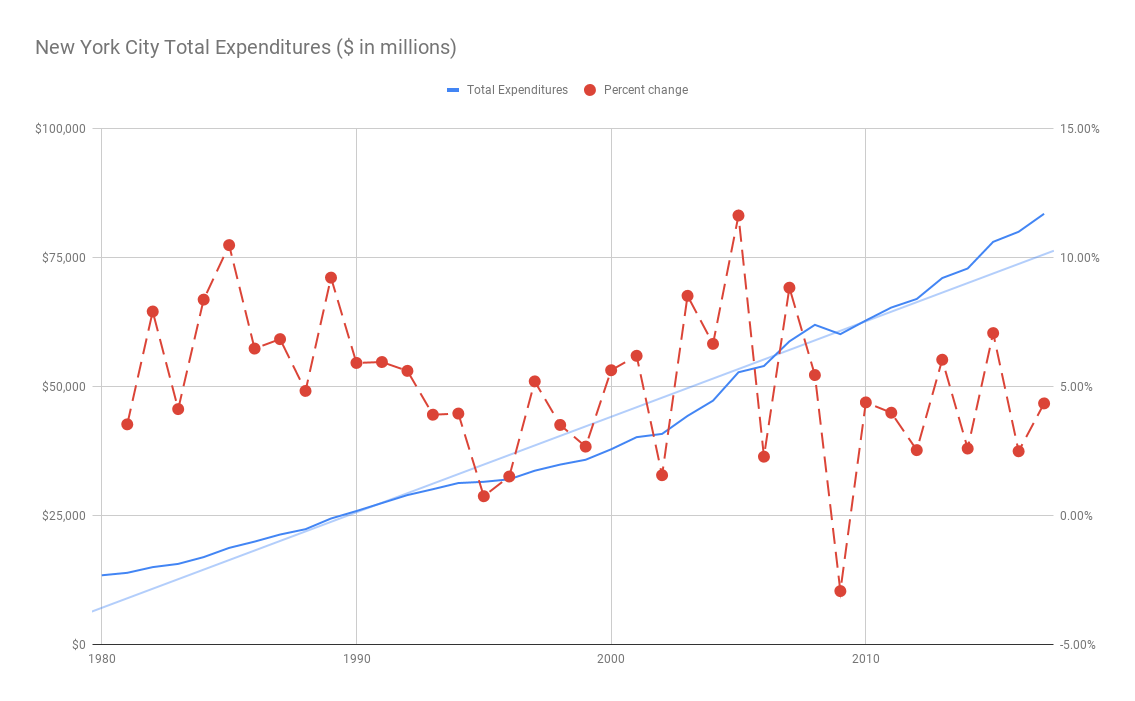
1980-2018 Total New York City Total Expenditures History.

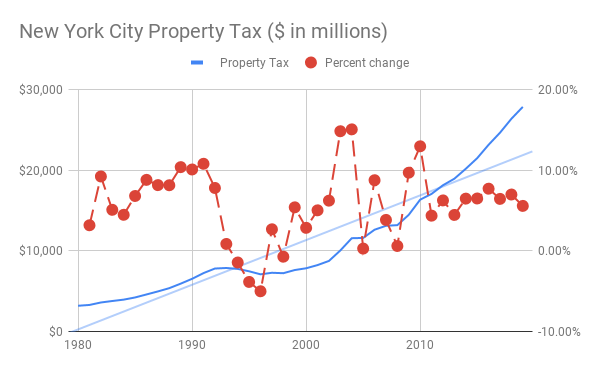
1980-2020 New York City Property Tax Revenue ($ in millions)

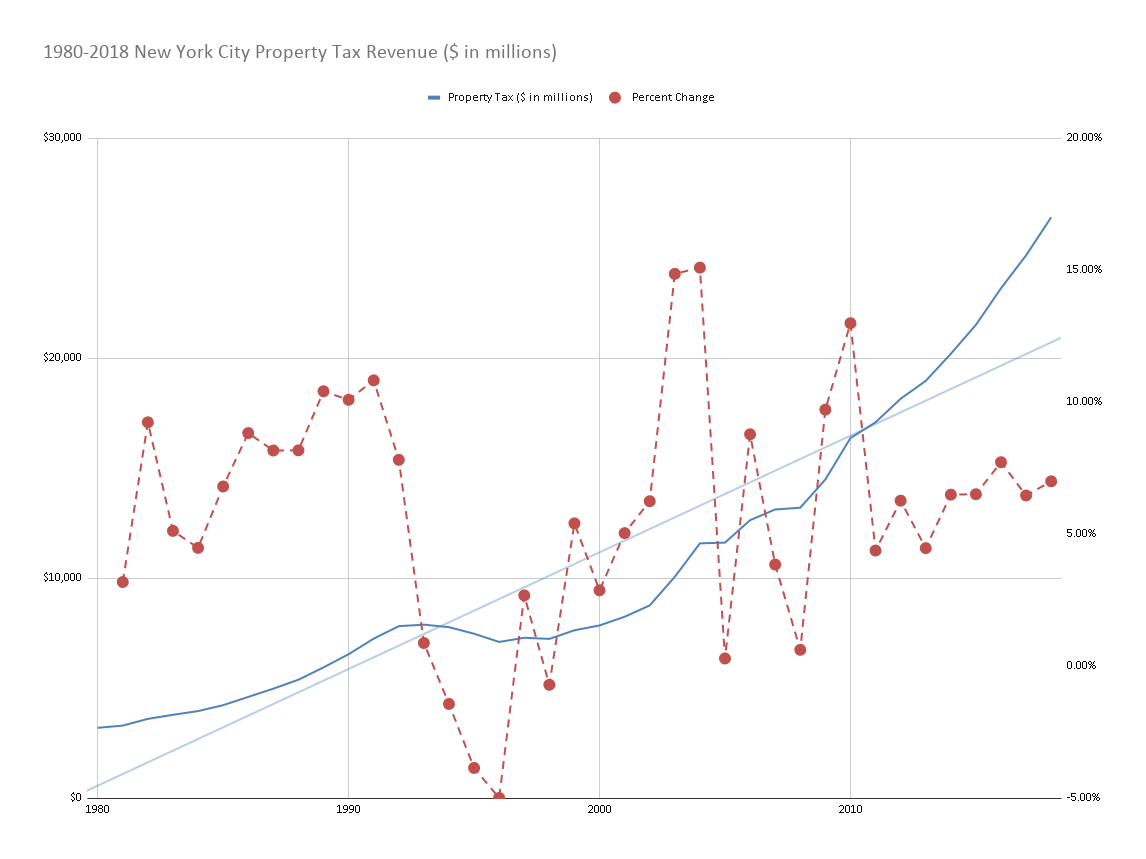
1980-2018 New York City Property Tax Revenue ($ in millions)

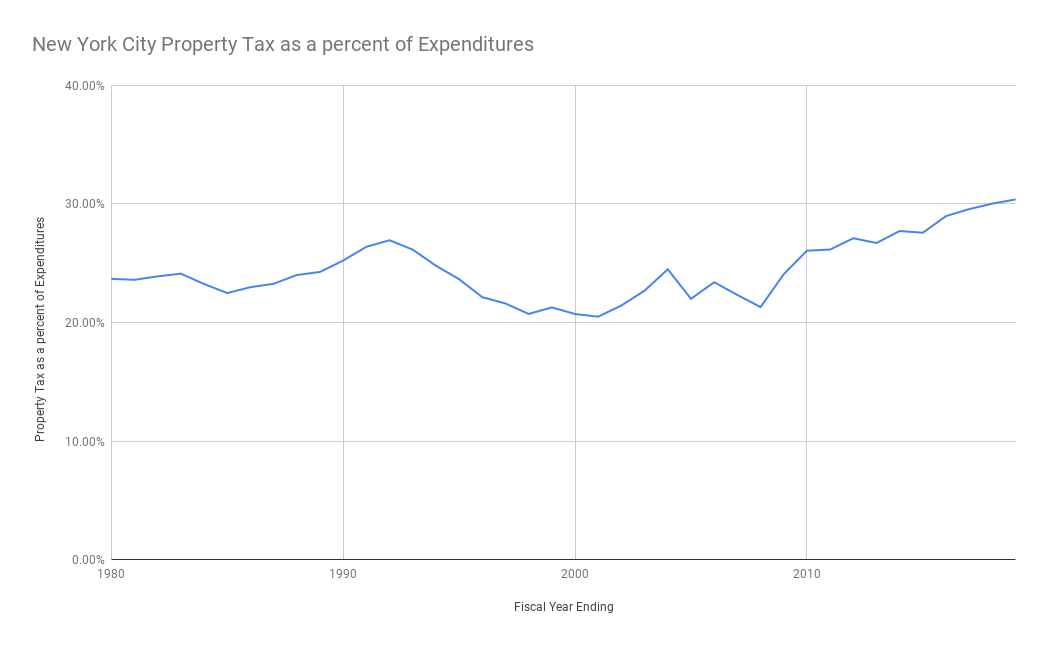
1980-2020 New York City Property Tax as a percent of Expenditures

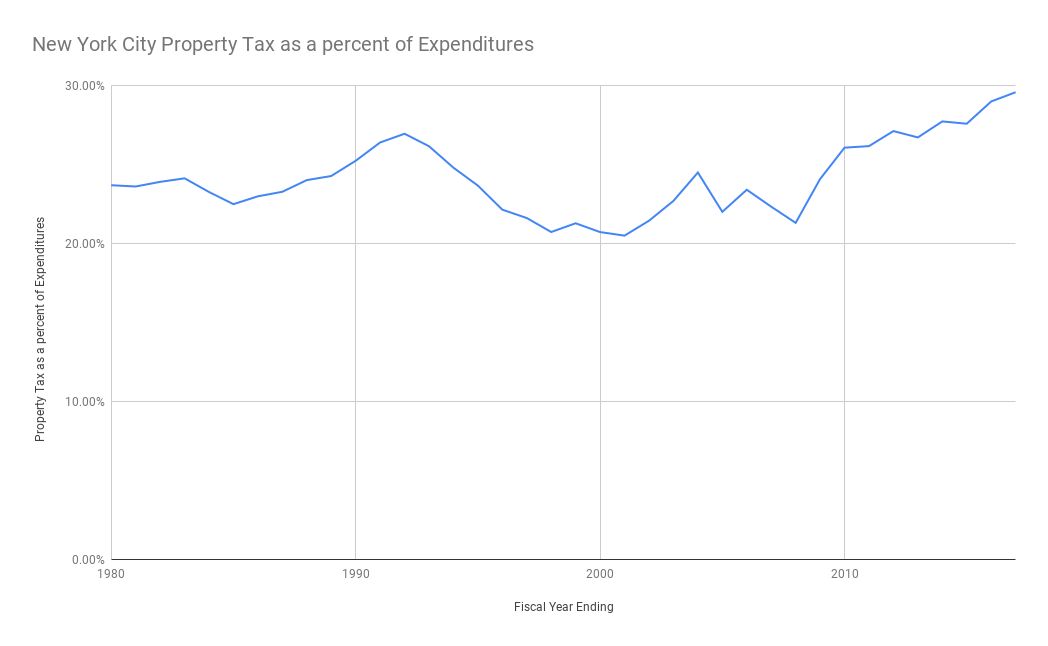
1980-2018 New York City Property Tax as a percent of Expenditures

== Attempts to change S7000A ==
On December 29, 2021, between the ending of one mayor and the beginning of a new mayor, New York City Advisory Commission on Property Tax Reform released its final report with recommendations to create a simpler, clearer and fairer property tax system. This proposal would create large changes in the current property tax structure of New York City. If adopted, it would create a system where "real" market value, instead of assessed value, would determine the property tax bill. Also, it would eliminate tax increase limits. And during the five year proposed transition period, it would remove the ability to pass the lower assessed value to a buyer upon sale of the property. The new proposal would reset the property on sale to the current market value. Tools have been built to allow the homeowners to calculate the new property tax bill based on the new 2021 Proposal given the new homestead exemption and income levels.

On Jun 20, 2024 New York State Assembly Bill A10600, the "Five Borough Fair Property Tax Act," was introduced and proposes a significant overhaul of New York City's real property tax system. The bill aims to eliminate the existing class share system and introduce a new Class One-A designation for specific residential properties, coupled with a phased-in tax rate adjustment. To provide relief for homeowners, the bill establishes a homestead exemption for Class One properties, offering income-based tax reductions for households earning up to $500,000. Furthermore, a "circuit breaker" tax abatement is introduced to cap property taxes exceeding 10% of household income, with a maximum abatement of $10,000 for those earning up to $100,000. The bill also impacts co-ops, condos, and rental properties by repealing Section 581 of the Real Property Tax Law, potentially leading to increased tax liabilities for these property types, and eliminating the partial tax abatement program for co-op and condo owners. Finally, the bill grants the NYC Commissioner of Finance the authority to determine fair market value for tax purposes, aiming for more consistent and equitable property assessments. In essence, the "Five Borough Fair Property Tax Act" seeks to create a more equitable system, though it may result in higher taxes for some property owners, particularly those in co-ops and condominiums, while offering relief to lower- and middle-income homeowners.

== Litigation ==
A property tax lawsuit was filed on April 25, 2017 against New York City and New York State by Tax Equity Now New York, a group that includes Jonathan Lippman, the law firm of Latham and Watkins representing homeowners, tenants, and other interested parties and groups.

On September 29, 2017 a group of New York City council members filed an amicus curiae brief in support of the Tax Equity Now New York lawsuit and the New York City Mayor argued that the case should be dismissed.
