= 1994 Michigan Proposal A =

Ballot measure to centralize school funding and control property assessments

- March 15, 1994
- Michigan Proposal A

Results
Choice	Votes	%
Yes	1,684,541	69.17%
No	750,952	30.83%
Total votes	2,435,493	100.00%
Registered voters/turnout	6,983,000	34.88%

Proposal A was a 1994 ballot measure that amended the Constitution of Michigan to restructure school funding and revise the property tax base. Approved by voters on March 15, 1994, the measure replaced certain local school property taxes with an added state sales tax and established a funding formula for distributing state school funding. Separately, it set a ceiling on individual property tax assessments.

The reform converted Michigan's school finance system from one of the country's most locally-controlled to one of the most state-controlled. Before Proposal A, approximately two-thirds of school revenues came from local property taxes, producing wide disparities in per-student spending across districts. A new formula reduced funding disparities by guaranteeing a minimum funding level, a "foundation allowance". Centralization also removed local school districts' option to raise operating revenue from homeowners' property and established and new rate limits on taxing other property. Studies show that the higher foundation increased test scores in underperforming districts in the five years following reform. Over longer periods, the reform reduced Michigan's educational spending relative to nearby states, with studies finding a net reduction in school performance.

Unrelated to school funding changes, Proposal A created new controls on property assessments, shifting burdens within local jurisdictions. A new assessment limit capped annual assessment increases to the inflation rate until sale. The rule provided long-term owners of property to accumulate tax relief; owners of slower-appreciating properties and new buyers paid correspondingly more.

== Text ==
Proposal A amended Article IX, Section 3 and other sections of the Constitution of Michigan. The amendment increased state sales and use taxes while dedicating the proceeds to school aid, established differential property tax treatment for homestead and nonhomestead property, capped annual increases in taxable value, and authorized a new statewide education tax. The amendment also reduced the state income tax rate from 4.6 percent to 4.4 percent.

== Background ==
=== Michigan property tax burden ===
Before Proposal A, Michigan relied more heavily on local property taxes than most other states. In 1993, the ratio of property taxes to state personal income ranked seventh highest in the nation. Relative to the average U.S. property taxpayer, Michigan property owners paid nearly one-third more in property taxes. For the 1992–93 school year, approximately 61.4 percent of total local school revenues originated from local and intermediate sources, primarily property taxes. Only three states—New Hampshire, Illinois, and Vermont—relied more heavily on local property taxes to fund K–12 schools. Nationally, the figure was 44.7 percent.

This heavy school reliance on property taxes created political dissatisfaction. School operating levies had grown at a rate outpacing both inflation and personal income: between 1980 and 1993, total school operating levies increased 135.5 percent while Michigan nominal personal income grew 112.4 percent and the Detroit CPI rose only 63.7 percent. Following a statewide freeze on property tax assessments in 1992, many residents faced double-digit increases in their assessments the following year, intensifying public receptiveness to reform.

=== School funding disparities ===
Michigan's reliance on local property taxes produced wide and growing inequities among school districts. Districts with substantial property wealth could provide generous support for schools while maintaining low tax rates, whereas property-poor districts taxed themselves at higher rates yet raised less revenue. By 1991–92, per-pupil spending ranged from $3,291 to $10,765 across districts. In fiscal year 1993–94, per-pupil state and local revenues varied from $3,398 to $10,294.

These disparities contributed to political pressure for reform. In March 1993, the small, rural Kalkaska school district closed early after voters rejected an operating millage, an incident that received national attention and reinforced perceptions that Michigan's school finance system required fundamental change.

=== The Headlee Amendment (1978) ===
The Headlee Amendment, adopted by Michigan voters in 1978, represented the state's first major property tax limitation. It restricts local government property tax revenue growth to the rate of inflation by requiring automatic reductions ("rollbacks") in millage rates when a jurisdiction's tax base grows faster than inflation, excluding new construction. The amendment also prohibits local governments from increasing millage rates above what was authorized in 1978 without voter approval and limits state-imposed mandates on local governments.

While the Headlee Amendment limited the taxes local governments could collect, it did not control increases in individual property owners' tax bills. When assessments on some properties rose faster than others, individual tax bills could increase even as the overall millage rate was rolled back.

=== Failed reform attempts (1972–1993) ===
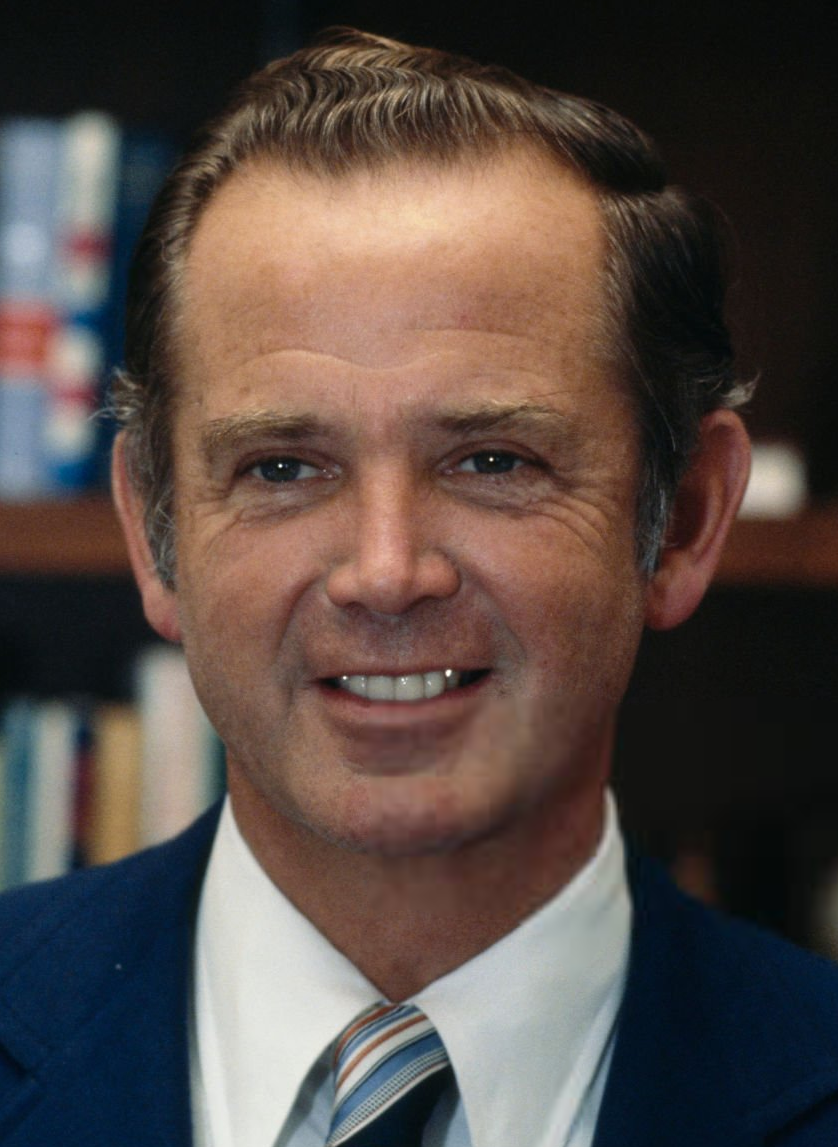
Gov. Bill Milliken

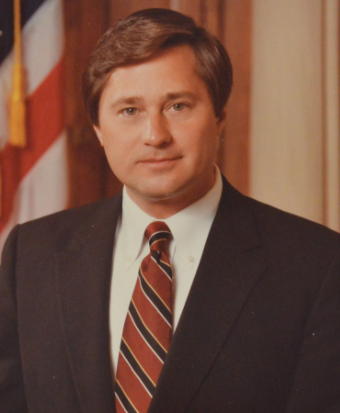
Gov. Jim Blanchard

Property tax reform emerged as a major political issue in Michigan during the 1970s. The Milliken and Blanchard administrations developed a series of ballot initiatives aimed at reducing property taxes and changing the school finance system, but voters rejected all of them. Between 1972 and 1993, Michigan voters defeated twelve ballot proposals that would have reduced property taxes as a source of school finance, including two in November 1972, two in November 1989, and one in 1992.

When John Engler ran for governor in 1990, he pledged to reduce property taxes by 20 percent. Several proposals to voters failed, including those with features similar to what would later be adopted. In November 1992, voters rejected two competing property tax proposals on the same ballot: a legislature-initiated "Proposal A," which would have capped assessment growth on homestead property at the lesser of 5 percent or inflation, and a voter-initiated Proposal C ("Cut and Cap"), which proposed a 3 percent cap on all property along with a 30 percent exemption from school operating taxes. Both were defeated, with Proposal A receiving 37.5 percent support and Proposal C receiving 40 percent support.

Engler put forward a more comprehensive school finance proposal in June 1993 that would have increased the sales tax, cut property taxes, capped assessments, and established a $4,800 per-pupil funding guarantee. Voters rejected it with 46 percent support.

Property tax reform ballot proposals in Michigan, 1992–1994
Proposal	Date	Initiator	Key provisions	Assessment cap	Yes votes	No votes	Result
Proposal A (HJR H)	Nov. 1992	Legislature	Separate millage rollback calculations for residential/agricultural vs. other property; no direct tax cut	5% or inflation on homestead only	1,433,354	2,384,777	Defeated (38%)
Proposal C ("Cut and Cap")	Nov. 1992	Citizen	30% exemption from school operating taxes (phased in); state reimbursement to schools	3% or inflation on all property	1,552,119	2,276,360	Defeated (41%)
Proposal A (HJR G)	June 1993	Legislature	Sales tax increase (4% to 6%); property tax cuts; $4,800 per-pupil foundation guarantee	5% or inflation on all property	1,008,425	1,164,468	Defeated (46%)
Proposal A (SJR S)	Mar. 1994	Legislature	Sales tax increase (4% to 6%); 6-mill state education tax; income tax cut (4.6% to 4.4%); foundation allowance system; no status quo option	5% or inflation on all property	1,684,541	750,952	Adopted (69%)

== Legislative history ==
=== Public Act 145 of 1993 ===
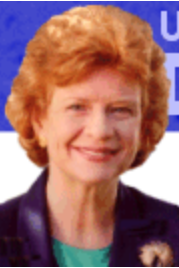
State Sen. Debbie Stabenow

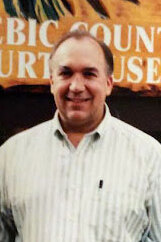
Gov. John Engler

On July 20, 1993, during a state senate debate on its recently failed property tax reduction proposal, state Senator Debbie Stabenow proposed an amendment to eliminate the property tax entirely as a source of local school finance. (Note: In the 1994 Michigan gubernatorial election, Senator Stabenow would run unsuccessfully on the Democratic ticket against Governor Engler. She would later be elected to the U.S. House (1998) and Senate (2000)) The move was widely interpreted as an attempt to demonstrate the impracticality of cutting taxes without specifying replacement revenues. Unexpectedly, the senate passed the amended bill the same day, the house followed a day later, and Engler immediately announced he would sign it.

Governor Engler signed Senate Bill 1 into law as Public Act 145 on August 19, 1993, at a media event at Greenfield Village in Dearborn. The act eliminated approximately $6.5 to $7 billion in property taxes for school operating expenses, effective December 31, 1993, without providing any replacement funding source. The legislation also ended the ability for local governments to "roll up" previously reduced millage rates under the Headlee Amendment.

=== The Engler proposal ===
In October 1993, Governor Engler presented his school finance reform plan in a document titled "Our Kids Deserve Better: New Schools for a New Century." The plan stated four goals: reducing property taxes, improving funding equity through a new foundation grant system, implementing educational reforms including school choice, and redefining state–local government relations.

The governor's revenue proposal included a new state property tax, an increase in the sales tax rate from 4 to 6 percent, redirection of approximately $400 million in state funds to K–12 education, a substantial increase in the cigarette tax, and several other revenue measures.

=== Ballot proposal vs. statutory plan ===
In December 1993, the legislature approved two competing replacement revenue plans. The first, known as the "Ballot Plan" or Proposal A, required voter approval to amend the constitution. The second, the "Statutory Plan," would take effect automatically if Proposal A failed.

Comparison of March 1994 reform plans (Note: Both plans created a new homestead/nonhomestead distinction and dedicated new revenues to the School Aid Fund.)
Feature	Proposal A (Ballot Plan)	Statutory Plan
Sales tax	From 4% to 6%	No change (4%)
Income tax	From 4.6% to 4.4%	Increase from 4.6% to 6.0%
Cigarette tax	From 25¢ to 75¢ per pack	Increase from 25¢ to 40¢ per pack
State Education Tax	6 mills on all property	12 mills on nonhomestead property only
Local school operating millage (homestead)	Eliminated	12 mills
Local school operating millage (nonhomestead)	Up to 18 mills	12 mills
Assessment cap	5% or inflation (constitutional)	None
Real estate transfer tax	0.75%	0.75%

=== March 1994 election ===
Proposal A passed with 69 percent of the vote (1,684,541 for, 750,952 against), carrying all 83 counties in the state. Contemporary analysts identified four factors contributing to the margin of victory. First, Michigan voters expressed a clear preference for the sales tax over the income tax as the primary revenue source. Second, Proposal A reduced homestead property tax rates more than the statutory alternative. Third, Proposal A's higher cigarette tax increase appealed to anti-tobacco sentiment. Fourth, Proposal A included the constitutional cap on assessment increases, while the statutory plan did not.

The assessment cap had been rejected as part of broader reform packages multiple times between 1992 and 1993, but in March 1994 it became a distinguishing feature between the two alternatives rather than a feature voters could simply reject outright.

== Provisions ==
=== Tax changes ===
- Sales and use tax: Proposal A increased Michigan's sales and use taxes from 4 percent to 6 percent, effective May 1, 1994. All proceeds from the additional 2 percent are constitutionally dedicated to the State School Aid Fund. Prior to reform, 60 percent of the 4 percent sales tax went to school aid; afterward, 60 percent of the original rate plus 100 percent of the increase went to the fund. The additional 2 percent rate does not apply to residential use of electricity, natural gas, or home heating fuels.
- State Education Tax: Proposal A established a new State Education Tax (SET) of 6 mills on all real and personal property subject to the general property tax. Unlike local school operating millages, this is a statewide tax not subject to local voter approval, though revenues remain subject to the state revenue limit established by the Headlee Amendment. Revenues are dedicated to the School Aid Fund.
- Homestead exemption: A central feature of Proposal A was the creation of differential tax treatment for homestead and nonhomestead property. Homestead property—defined as a taxpayer's primary residence or qualified agricultural property—became exempt from local school operating taxes. Nonhomestead property, including commercial and industrial property, rental housing, and vacation homes, remained subject to up to 18 mills for local school operating purposes in addition to the 6-mill SET.
- Income tax: The state income tax rate decreased from 4.6 percent to 4.4 percent, effective May 1, 1994. Beginning October 1, 1994, 14.4 percent of gross income tax collections were dedicated to the School Aid Fund.
- Real estate transfer tax: A new state tax of 0.75 percent on the value of transferred property took effect January 1, 1995, with proceeds dedicated to the School Aid Fund.
- Cigarette tax: The state cigarette tax increased from $0.25 to $0.75 per pack, with 63.4 percent of proceeds dedicated to the School Aid Fund.
- Other tobacco products: A new 16 percent tax on the wholesale price of other tobacco products was established, with proceeds going to the School Aid Fund.
- Lottery: Net lottery revenues continued to be dedicated to the School Aid Fund, as they had been prior to reform.

=== Assessment cap (taxable value) ===
Before Proposal A, property taxes were levied on state equalized value (SEV), defined as 50 percent of a property's market value. Beginning in 1995, taxes were instead levied on "taxable value," which cannot increase by more than the lesser of 5 percent or the rate of inflation annually, excluding additions and improvements. When a property is sold or transferred, its taxable value resets to SEV. (Note: Because inflation remained below 5 percent in every year from 1994–2020, taxable value increases were effectively been limited to the inflation rate.)

=== Foundation allowance system ===
Proposal A replaced Michigan's previous school aid formula with a foundation allowance system. Each district receives a per-pupil foundation allowance funded through a combination of the 18-mill nonhomestead levy and state aid from the School Aid Fund. The state guarantees a minimum allowance. Districts cannot raise operating revenue beyond their designated allowance without voter approval of supplemental "hold harmless" millages.

For the initial 1994–95 implementation, districts were assigned allowances based on their prior-year spending:

- Districts spending less than $3,950 per pupil received foundation grants of $4,200
- Districts spending between $3,950 and $6,500 received grants based on a sliding scale, with increases ranging from $250 to $160 per pupil
- Districts spending more than $6,500 received $6,660 and could raise additional "hold-harmless" revenue through local millages up to their prior spending level plus $160

The basic foundation allowance—initially $5,000 per pupil—increases annually according to an index based on growth in School Aid Fund revenues per pupil. Districts below the basic foundation level receive larger annual increases until all districts reach at least that amount, while districts above the basic level receive the same dollar increase as the basic foundation. This mechanism was designed to gradually reduce funding disparities by allowing low-spending districts to catch up over time.

== Related legislation ==
=== Charter schools ===
As part of the educational reforms accompanying Proposal A, Michigan authorized the creation of public school academies, commonly known as charter schools. Charter schools are public schools that may be organized by teachers, parents, universities, community colleges, or other nonprofit organizations and chartered by a public entity such as a local school board, the State Board of Education, a public university, or a department of state government.

Charter schools have no prescribed local service population and no local tax base. Students may select a school based on curriculum or other criteria, and all applicants have an equal chance of admission. The per-pupil foundation allowance follows the student to the charter school.

=== Schools of choice ===
Proposal A also enabled "schools of choice," allowing students to attend a public school in a district other than the one in which they reside. Students are responsible for their own transportation, and all students have an equal chance of acceptance regardless of residence. Under the program, local districts may opt to accept students from other districts within the same intermediate school district.

The schools of choice provision was intended to make schools more responsive to student needs and parent expectations by allowing foundation grant funding to follow students to their chosen school.

== Effects ==
=== Property tax reduction ===
By exempting homesteads from paying for local school operations, Proposal A produced a substantial reduction in Michigan's homeowner property tax burden. The reform cut local property taxes by approximately $63 billion between fiscal years 1994 and 2003, while state taxes increased by $46 billion, yielding a net tax reduction of approximately $17 billion over the decade.

Average statewide millage rates for homestead property fell from 56.6 mills in 1993 to approximately 31 mills after reform, a reduction of about 44 percent. Nonhomestead property experienced a smaller reduction, from 56.6 mills to approximately 49 mills. Before reform, Michigan's property tax burden exceeded the national average by more than 33 percent; afterward, it fell below the national average.

The magnitude of millage reductions varied by location. Counties in mid- and southern Michigan, which had relatively high pre-reform school operating millages, experienced the largest reductions. Genesee County recorded the largest decline at 32.64 mills, while Leelanau County in northern Michigan saw the smallest reduction at 8.65 mills. Livingston County achieved a 54 percent reduction in homestead millage rates, while Keweenaw County experienced a 30 percent reduction.

=== School funding effects ===
==== Funding equity ====
Proposal A significantly reduced funding disparities among Michigan school districts. In fiscal year 1994, the ten lowest-revenue districts received per-pupil revenues of $3,476, while the ten highest-revenue districts received $9,726—nearly three times as much. By 2003, the ratio had narrowed to less than 2:1, with the minimum foundation allowance at $6,700 and the highest-revenue districts averaging $11,389.

Early analysis showed the reform achieved equalization primarily by "leveling up" low-spending districts rather than reducing spending in wealthy districts. In 1994, 32 states had more equal per-pupil revenue distributions than Michigan; by 2000, only 17 states did. Districts in the lowest spending quintile received the largest increases: pupils in the lowest-revenue K–12 district saw a 30 percent real-dollar increase in per-pupil base revenue, while students in the highest-revenue districts experienced a nearly 4 percent decrease in inflation-adjusted funding.

By 2016, 84 percent of Michigan school districts and charter schools received the same per-pupil foundation allowance, and 95 percent fell within a narrow band near the minimum. The gap between the richest and poorest districts had narrowed by nearly $3,000 since 1994. Only 43 districts—5 percent of the total—remained above the "hold harmless" threshold, serving approximately one-ninth of Michigan public school students.

Later analysis has indicated that this higher floor came with a new ceiling. Research comparing Michigan with neighboring states found that centralization reduced per-pupil revenue by approximately $1,300 to $1,600 annually, with reductions occurring in both low- and high-revenue districts. The foundation allowance established a minimum funding level, while the loss of local taxing authority prevented districts from exceeding state-determined amounts. Revenue reduction occurred in both low- and high-revenue districts, suggesting that centralization's price and income effects outweighed any leveling-up from foundation grants.

==== Shift to state control ====
Proposal A transformed Michigan's school finance system from one of the most decentralized in the nation to one of the most centralized. Before reform, approximately two-thirds of education revenues were raised locally, with local voters setting property tax rates to support their schools. After reform, the state's share of K–12 general funding increased from 37.1 percent in 1992–93 to 77.7 percent in 2000–01.

Under the new system, local districts lost virtually all control over the amount of money available for school operations. Districts cannot unilaterally increase their per-pupil revenues beyond the foundation allowance set by the legislature. Even districts permitted limited local supplementation through "hold harmless" millages face state-determined maximum spending levels.

This centralization shifted the political debate on schools from property tax reduction to educational content, achievement testing, and school choice. However, economists anticipated that the loss of local control over spending would become increasingly noticeable as district-by-district preferences diverged from the 1993–94 baseline used to set foundation allowances.

Economic research on school finance equalization suggests that the design of equalization schemes affects not only the distribution but also the level of school spending. When equalization removes local voters' ability to increase school spending, the median voter in the state—typically with lower demand for education spending than median voters in high-spending districts—becomes decisive, potentially reducing overall expenditure levels over time.

==== Effects on student achievement ====
In the decade after passage, several studies examined whether the funding changes under Proposal A affected student outcomes. Research by Leslie Papke using Michigan Educational Assessment Program (MEAP) data from 1992 to 1998 found that increases in spending had statistically significant effects on fourth-grade math pass rates, with the largest effects in schools with initially poor performance. Districts in the lowest spending percentile showed the largest improvement—a 10 percent increase in real spending was associated with a 1 to 2 percentage point increase in math pass rates.

Subsequent research corroborated these findings. A study of reading and math test scores between 1995 and 2001 found significant improvements in previously low-spending districts, though no effects in average-spending districts and suggestive evidence of negative effects in the highest-spending districts, which faced binding constraints on spending growth.

Research on long-term effects found that students exposed to higher per-pupil expenditures had improved postsecondary outcomes. Students who received $1,000 greater per-pupil expenditures were 7 percent more likely to enroll in college and 11 percent more likely to earn a postsecondary degree. However, these beneficial effects were concentrated among urban and suburban, low-poverty, and high-achieving school districts rather than the lowest-income districts that received the largest funding increases.

These studies examined data primarily from the late 1990s and early 2000s, when real per-pupil funding was increasing. Whether gains persisted after 2001–02, when real funding began declining, remains less studied. By 2025, Michigan ranked 44th in fourth-grade reading on the National Assessment of Educational Progress, prompting debate over whether the issue was funding levels, policy implementation, or other factors.

==== Revenue volatility and fiscal strain ====
Proposal A increased the School Aid Fund's vulnerability to economic cycles by shifting reliance from the relatively stable property tax to more volatile sales and income taxes. Together, sales and income taxes account for approximately two-thirds of the School Aid Fund's tax revenue.

During the early 2000s recession, this volatility became apparent. Property tax collections held up well, but sales and income tax revenues declined. The legislature transferred nearly $2 billion to the School Aid Fund from one-time sources to avoid cuts. Once these reserves were exhausted, education revenues no longer kept pace with rising operating costs. In fiscal year 2003, Michigan schools experienced the first reductions in foundation support since Proposal A was approved.

In every year since Proposal A was approved, the legislature appropriated General Fund money to supplement the School Aid Fund to finance foundation allowance increases. This gap averaged more than $500 million annually.

In inflation-adjusted terms, the foundation allowance declined substantially after its early-2000s peak. The weighted average foundation allowance reached its highest real value in 2002–03; by 2023–24, districts received approximately $4,250 less per pupil in inflation-adjusted dollars than at the peak—a decline of 31 percent. If Michigan's typical foundation allowance had kept pace with inflation since 2002–03, the state would have allocated an additional $5.9 billion in foundation allowances in 2023–24. Policymakers partially offset this erosion by expanding categorical grants outside the foundation allowance system.

==== School construction and capital spending ====
Proposal A changed only the financing of school operations, not capital expenditures. School districts continue to rely entirely on local property tax revenue for construction, renovation, and other capital investments. Michigan remains one of the few states that does not subsidize capital costs in low-property-wealth districts.

The reduction in property taxes brought about by Proposal A made voters less hostile to new bond issues. Outstanding qualified school bonds roughly doubled from $3.8 billion in 1993 to $7.3 billion in 1997, then doubled again to $14.4 billion by 2010. However, this increase did not benefit all districts equally; property-wealthy districts were able to build substantial new facilities while property-poor districts remained unable to repair aging buildings.

Analysts identified this capital investment surge as an unintended outcome of the operating expenditure constraints. Unable to unilaterally increase per-pupil operating revenues, some districts attempted to attract students through facility upgrades funded by debt.

=== Assessment cap effects ===
==== Tax savings and inequities ====
The taxable value cap provided property tax savings that accumulated over time for long-term property owners. By 2002, the cumulative annual savings from the cap reached approximately $2.3 billion. The Michigan Department of Treasury estimated that the tax expenditure from the taxable value cap reached $3.4 billion annually by 2010, making it the second-largest property tax expenditure in the state after the homestead exemption.

However, these savings were not evenly distributed. The cap creates horizontal inequity—owners of identical properties pay different taxes based on length of ownership. A 2010 statewide study found that long-time homeowners enjoyed effective tax rates approximately 18 percent lower than recent purchasers. Research on Detroit found even larger disparities: homeowners living in their properties since 1994 faced effective tax rates 19 to 52 percent lower than recent buyers, holding neighborhood and property characteristics constant.

The benefits also varied by property value. In Detroit, properties in the middle value deciles received the largest effective tax rate reductions—as much as two to three times greater than the reductions received by the lowest-valued properties. The cap also produced vertical inequity: properties in the fifth value decile (worth approximately $26,500) owned since 1994 could pay as little as $888 annually in taxes, while recently purchased properties in the second decile (worth approximately $14,500) could owe as much as $958—demonstrating that lower-valued properties could pay more in absolute dollars than properties worth nearly twice as much.

Because total local revenue needs do not decline when individual assessments are capped, the tax burden shifts to properties not protected by the cap or receiving smaller benefits: recent home purchasers, owners of nonhomestead property, and renters. A Minnesota study found that in 2006, 78 percent of homeowners actually paid higher property taxes under the state's assessment limit than they would have without it, due to rate adjustments needed to offset revenue losses from capped properties.

==== Tax base erosion ====
The taxable value cap creates a structural gap between market value and taxable value that widens whenever property appreciation exceeds the cap rate. (Note: The gap must widen during any sustained period when appreciation exceeds inflation. Because inflation has remained below 5 percent in every year since 1994, taxable value increases have effectively been limited to the inflation rate, and the 5 percent statutory cap has rarely been the binding constraint.) Unlike the Headlee Amendment, which constrains the rate of revenue growth while maintaining market-value assessment, the taxable value cap exempts unrealized appreciation from the tax base. This distinction is that Headlee limits how much governments can collect from a given tax base, while the cap shrinks the base itself.

By 2007, statewide taxable value was approximately $95.8 billion below state equalized value. The gap compressed during the Great Recession as falling property values reduced the differential, reaching $48.2 billion by 2010. As property markets recovered and values surged following the COVID-19 pandemic, the gap expanded rapidly—from $130 billion in 2022 to $197.7 billion by 2024, representing 29 percent of total market value excluded from taxation and comprising Michigan's second largest tax expenditure.

==== Lock-in effect ====
Because homeowners forfeit accumulated tax benefits when they sell, the taxable value cap creates a "lock-in effect" that discourages residential mobility. A 2015 study of Detroit found that the cap increased average ownership duration by approximately 36 percent—7.5 years longer than would otherwise be expected. The effect varied by property value: no lock-in was detected in the lowest-value quintile, but substantial decreases in mobility appeared in higher quintiles.

Similar lock-in effects have been documented under California's Proposition 13 and Florida's Save Our Homes amendment. A California study found average tenure length increased by 0.66 years statewide, with increases of two to three years in high-appreciation areas like San Francisco and San Jose. The reduced housing turnover can decrease the efficiency of residential real estate markets by preventing properties from flowing to their highest-value uses.

Research on housing transactions in Ann Arbor found a related market distortion: homebuyers systematically failed to account for the "pop-up" tax increase they would face when taxable value reset to market value after purchase. Because Michigan implements reassessments only on January 1 rather than immediately upon sale, buyers receive a temporary tax reduction in their year of purchase, which obscures the impending increase. Buyers capitalized temporary tax savings at multiples of their true present value, effectively overpaying for housing—an estimated $30 million collectively in Ann Arbor in 2005 alone. (Note: If sellers can capture these capitalized benefits through higher sale prices, the efficiency losses from reduced mobility may be partially offset, though buyers' welfare losses from overpayment remain.)

==== Property tax delinquency ====
The interaction between the taxable value cap and assessment administration contributed to a property tax crisis in Detroit. When property values collapsed during the Great Recession—median values fell from $80,000 in 2007 to just above $20,000 in 2009—city assessors failed to reduce assessments correspondingly. Chronic overassessment at rates up to five times the legal limit produced tax bills that many residents could not afford.

Because Proposal A limits increases in taxable value to the inflation rate, assessors who reduce values during downturns cannot recover them when markets improve. This discourages accurate assessment in declining markets.

Detroit's property tax delinquency rate reached 54 percent of parcels by 2013, leaving over $240 million in uncollected taxes and contributing to the city's 2013 bankruptcy filing. Beginning in 2014, Detroit undertook a comprehensive reassessment—the first in over 60 years—reducing assessed values by as much as $213 million in a single year. Research found that assessment reductions lowered delinquency rates: reductions that also lowered tax bills reduced delinquency by 2.7 percent, while reductions in assessed value alone (without corresponding tax decreases) reduced delinquency by 1.7 percent, suggesting that perceived fairness affects compliance independent of actual tax burden.

== Analysis and reception ==
=== Assessment cap criticism ===
An expert report written for the Lincoln Institute of Land Policy characterized assessment limits generally as "the least effective, least equitable, and least efficient strategies available for providing tax relief." Critics argued that alternative mechanisms—including circuit breaker programs targeting relief to low-income households, homestead exemptions, and property tax deferral options—could provide tax relief without creating horizontal inequities or eroding the tax base. Michigan already employed several of these alternative mechanisms, which would provide protection against excessive tax growth even if the taxable value cap were removed.

Policy analysts proposed several reforms to address the cap's effects. One approach would grandfather existing property owners while eliminating the cap for future purchasers, allowing the tax base to broaden with the pace of property turnover.

The interaction between Proposal A's assessment cap and the Headlee Amendment's levy limit has created a uniquely restrictive property tax environment. Michigan is the only state that combines all three major types of property tax limits: rate limits, assessment limits, and levy limits.

=== School choice effects ===
Legislative changes accompanying Proposal A authorized charter schools and expanded inter-district choice, allowing foundation grant funding to follow students to their chosen school. By fiscal year 2002, approximately 64,260 pupils attended 189 Michigan charter schools, comprising 3.7 percent of all public K–12 students.

Research on charter school competition found that Michigan public schools facing significant charter enrollment (at least 6 percent of district enrollment in charters) improved both achievement and productivity. Fourth-grade reading and math scores rose by 1.2 and 1.1 scale points respectively in schools facing charter competition, and productivity (achievement per dollar spent) increased significantly. The effects were concentrated in lower grades, where charter schools enrolled a larger share of students.

However, charter schools were not evenly distributed across the state. They were predominantly located in southeast Michigan, particularly in Wayne County, where they served mostly students living in poorer suburbs or inner-city Detroit. The inter-district choice program was similarly concentrated, with more than one-third of all transfers taking place within the Detroit metropolitan area. Statewide effects on traditional public school performance were therefore limited by the geographic concentration of choice options.

=== School funding debates ===
==== Equity outcomes ====
Supporters of Proposal A emphasized that the reform substantially achieved its equity objectives. The gap between the richest and poorest districts narrowed by nearly $3,000 per pupil, and the share of districts receiving the minimum foundation allowance grew from less than half to 84 percent. The Mackinac Center for Public Policy argued that "Proposal A's plan has mostly worked" and that remaining disparities were driven by a small number of outlier districts protected by hold-harmless provisions rather than systemic inequity.

In 2016, Mackinac analysts noted that further equalization would require either modest gains for most districts (approximately $300 per pupil if high-spending districts were "leveled down") or substantial tax increases (an estimated $6.4 billion to bring all districts to the highest funding levels). From this perspective, the policy question was whether the marginal costs of additional equalization were justified by expected improvements in student outcomes.

==== Adequacy concerns ====
Michigan's school finance reform was designed primarily to improve equity in funding across districts, not to ensure that funding levels were adequate to achieve desired educational outcomes. By the early 2000s, the national school finance debate had shifted toward "educational adequacy"—the question of whether funding provides the resources necessary to support student achievement.

Critics argued that equalization to a common foundation allowance did not address whether that common level was sufficient. The real value of the foundation allowance declined 31 percent from its 2002–03 peak to 2023–24, falling below the inflation-adjusted minimum level that districts could receive in 1994–95. This erosion occurred while state accountability standards and expectations for student achievement increased.

The adequacy framework also highlighted that the cost of educating students varies with their characteristics and circumstances. Districts enrolling disproportionate concentrations of high-cost students—including students from low-income families, English-language learners, and students with disabilities—may require additional resources to meet state accountability standards. Proposal A's uniform per-pupil foundation allowance did not fully account for these cost differences.

A 2017 overview of Michigan school funding noted that inflation-adjusted per-pupil spending had remained largely flat over the preceding decade, and that enrollment decline meant the foundation allowance—distributed per pupil—provided less total revenue to districts even when nominal amounts increased. The Mackinac Center for Public Policy argued that research suggested "just adding more money to the existing system is unlikely to boost student achievement in any meaningful way."

==== Urban districts and declining enrollment ====
Proposal A's per-pupil funding mechanism created particular challenges for districts experiencing declining enrollment. Under the formula, total district funding rises and falls with student counts, but many costs—including facilities, administration, and contractual obligations—are fixed in the short run.

Urban school districts and rural areas in the Upper Peninsula faced the greatest fiscal stress. The combination of modest real foundation allowance growth and sustained enrollment declines produced severe budget problems in districts including Detroit, Flint, Lansing, and others.

Analysts have predicted that Proposal A may not only respond to suburban sprawl but encourage it: newer suburban districts receive large infusions of additional funds to expand educational offerings, while older urban communities must make staffing and program cuts. These budgetary changes can create negative perceptions that enhance the prospect of additional families leaving, creating a self-reinforcing cycle.

==== Spending constraints and efficiency ====
Some researchers find that spending constraints induce efficiency improvements. A study of Michigan public schools found that districts facing competition from charter schools raised their productivity—measured as achievement per dollar spent—by shifting resources toward instruction and away from administrative support services. Schools facing critical levels of charter competition (at least 6 percent of enrollment) showed statistically significant productivity gains, raising achievement without proportional spending increases.

Similarly, research on the finance reform's effects found that high-spending districts, which faced strict ceilings on spending growth under Proposal A, allocated a larger share of expenditures to instruction and a smaller share to support services compared to unconstrained districts. Because instructional expenditures are generally considered more productive than administrative expenditures, this reallocation suggested that spending constraints induced efficiency-enhancing responses.

However, these efficiency gains were concentrated in districts facing competitive pressure or binding constraints. Districts in declining-enrollment urban areas faced a different calculus: they needed to cut programs and staff regardless of efficiency considerations, simply because revenues fell faster than fixed costs could be reduced.

== See also ==
- Proposition 13 (1978) – California's property tax limitation measure, which established assessment caps that influenced Michigan's approach
- Headlee Amendment – Michigan's 1978 constitutional amendment limiting property tax revenue growth
- Serrano v. Priest – California Supreme Court decisions that spurred school finance equalization reforms nationally
- San Antonio Independent School District v. Rodriguez – U.S. Supreme Court case holding that education is not a fundamental right under the federal constitution, leaving school finance reform to states
