= Teeter Plan =

The Teeter Plan (first enacted 1949) provides California counties with an optional alternative method for allocating delinquent property tax revenues. Using the accrual method of accounting under the Teeter Plan, counties allocate property tax revenues based on the total amount of property taxes billed, but not yet collected. The Teeter Plan allows counties to finance property tax receipts for local agencies by borrowing money to advance cash to each taxing jurisdiction in an amount equal to the current year's delinquent property taxes. In exchange, the counties receive the penalties and interest on the delinquent taxes when collected. For counties not under the Teeter Plan, interest and penalty are allocated to all agencies based on their pro rata share of the delinquent property tax. However, the county retains the penalty on delinquent property taxes if the delinquency is cleared up within the same fiscal year.
