= Property tax abolition movement =

The property tax abolition movement is a movement in the United States to eliminate property taxes, primarily on homeownership. Supporters argue that property taxes are burdensome for cash-poor but asset-wealthy seniors, while opponents argue property taxes are a more progressive form of taxation and/or that full abolition of property taxes could result in large cuts to municipal services or untenable increases to other taxes (like sales taxes).

== Background ==
Supporters of property tax limit ballot measures, such as California Proposition 13 or Oregon Ballot Measure 5, argued that the property taxes that accompanied rising home values outpaced residents' incomes and relief was necessary.

In the 2020s, as houses became more expensive and seniors' social security incomes could not keep up, advocates began to argue for the elimination of property taxes entirely. Supporters of property tax abolition include former Congresswoman Marjorie Taylor Greene and Florida governor Ron Desantis. Full property tax abolition efforts have often failed to gain enough support due to local governments' reliance on property tax revenue, resulting in property tax relief referendums and legislation instead.

== Legislation ==
=== Referendums ===
A referendum to abolish property taxes in North Dakota failed 63% to 37% in November 2024. This was the first referendum in a wave of property tax abolition efforts, largely led by Republican legislatures.

An effort by Georgia Republicans to place an amendment on the ballot to eliminate property taxes on primary homes failed in mid-2026.

Florida governor Ron Desantis expressed support for property tax abolition via a ballot initiative, calling "land/property" taxation as the "more oppressive and ineffective form of taxation" on X. The Florida Homestead Tax Exemptions, Property Assessments, and Spending Restrictions Amendment is on the ballot in November 2026, although would enact a property tax reduction, not elimination.

In Ohio, an organization called the Official Committee to Abolish Ohio’s Property Taxes gathered over 300,000 signatures to place a property tax abolition amendment on the ballot in 2026, falling short by 100,000 signatures.

== Criticism ==
Opponents of property tax abolition argue that property taxes are often replaced with regressive forms of taxation, such as sales tax increases. The Tax Foundation, an international economic think tank, opposes full property tax abolition, stating that major reductions or elimination of property taxes "create more problems than they solve, distorting property markets and undermining long-term housing affordability." They also state that property tax elimination/reduction could require untenably large increases in other taxes depending on the economic landscape of the municipality (agricultural vs. residential vs. urban) and that alternative revenue sources are less conducive to economic growth.

Progressives favor other forms of property taxes, such as circuit breakers (where property tax is tied to a percentage of income), or replacing property taxes with a land value tax (originally espoused by Georgists in the 1890's).

== See also ==
- Property tax revolt, a series of tax reform laws in the United States in the late 20th century
- Taxation in the United States
- Tax resistance in the United States
- Wealth tax
