= Circuit breaker (property tax) =

Type of US income tax refund

A circuit breaker is an income tax refund in the United States given to low income individuals and families whose property tax liability is a large percentage of their yearly income. The term was coined by John Shannon of the Advisory Commission on Intergovernmental Relations in the 1960s. The term suggests that, just as an electrical circuit breaker will prevent an electric circuit from being overloaded with energy, the refund prevents low-income households from being overloaded with tax burden.

There are currently 18 states who use a wide scope of programs to relieve the property tax burden for low income individuals and families. As a refund, these programs require low income households to pay the entire property tax up-front then a credit or refund is given during the income tax processing, which requires relief is given after the property taxes are paid. The locality levying the property tax and utilizing the revenue does not see a decrease in revenue from property taxes; rather, the state government passes down relief for those property taxes that are paid.

== Types of property tax circuit breakers ==
Threshold circuit breakers: Threshold circuit breakers are the most popular type utilizing a specific threshold percentage that property taxes must exceed before any tax relief is available. With this type of circuit breaker relief would be equal to the amount of property taxes paid above the threshold. There are single-threshold formulas where a single threshold is established to focus on tax relief, and there is also multiple-threshold formulas where the relief can be applied more progressively in an incremental fashion. The multiple-threshold formula is more common than the single-threshold formula.

Sliding scale circuit breakers: These circuit breakers utilize income brackets to formulate a reduction in property taxes regardless of the amount of property tax. The tax relief will be the same within each tax bracket and will decrease incrementally with each increase in the income bracket so that those with the lowest of incomes will receive the highest of property tax reductions. An example of this method would be: A 50% reduction for the first $10,000 income, a 40% reduction for the next $5,000 income, a 30% reduction for the next $5,000 in income. This sliding scale would eventually stop at a certain income level where a property tax reduction would possibly be deemed unnecessary.

== Eligibility for property tax circuit breaker ==
There are currently 18 different programs that provide property tax relief in the United States. The programs and their eligibility vary by state. The states with these programs limit eligibility in three ways; whether the tax payer is a renter or a homeowner, whether the tax payer is elderly or disabled, and the income level of the tax payer. Circuit breakers are offered to renters and homeowners in 16 states, only home owners in 1 state and only renters in 1 state; in 8 states the programs are limited to only the elderly or disabled and in all 18 states there is a maximum income level after which a taxpayer no longer qualifies for a refund. Although some states have a much more generous income ceiling, participation in these programs is limited by a requirement that the property tax liability be a certain percentage of the taxpayers yearly income. In turn, it is believed by researchers that this type of tax relief is more beneficial to low income families rather than middle or high income families.

=== Examples of eligibility by state ===
- Washington, D.C.: Both renters and home-owners are eligible for the program as long as they meet certain income and residency guidelines, and if their property taxes exceed a certain share of their income. The income ceiling is $40,000 and will be increased to $50,000 in 2016. Residents over the age of 70 who make less than $60,000 per year will be eligible. In order to claim this credit the tax filer must be a resident for the full year. The maximum credit is $1,000 and for filers who make less than $25,000 per year the property tax must be over 3% of their yearly income. For tax filers who make between $25,000 and $40,000 the property tax must be over 4% of their yearly income. For those over the age of 70 who make under $60,000 per year the property tax must exceed 3% of their yearly income. Renters may claim 20% of their yearly rent paid as property tax but may only receive up to the maximum $1,000 for the credit.
- Illinois: Elderly and the disabled were the only two groups that could qualify for the property tax circuit breaker program in the state of Illinois. The guidelines for eligibility were set by income with $27,610 being the maximum income for a single person household, $36,635 for two people, and $45,657 for three or more people. This program also enabled renters to qualify for aid as well, including nursing home patients. As of fiscal year 2013, Illinois has ended its property tax circuit breaker program and has instead relied upon the Homestead exemption for property tax relief.
- Maine: Both homeowners and renters can qualify for the program here, which is based on yearly income as well as the percentage of income tax paid and certain residency requirements. Applicants must be a Maine resident for any time during the tax year and the income guidelines are based on a tier system as follows: $33,333 for a household of one, $43,333 for a household of two and $53,333 for a household of three or more. The income ceiling will be adjusted for cost of living by the year. To qualify for the program the applicant must have paid more than 6% of their yearly income in property tax, or 40% of their yearly income in rent. The return will be 50% of the total paid over 6% of the yearly income and is capped at $600. In Maine even people who live in subsidized housing can qualify for the program.
- Maryland: Only property owners can qualify for the program in Maryland, which has a unique formula for eligibility and calculating the actual credit itself. This program also takes total net worth as a factor. In Maryland an applicant must be the owner of the property and it must be their principle dwelling for at least 6 months out of the year including July 1. An applicants total net worth must be less than $200,000 not including the value of the property and an applicants household income must be less than $60,000 per year. The formula used to calculate the value of the tax credit is based on an incremental increase in income compared to the percentage of income used to pay for property tax. For those making less than $8,000 a year the credit will be the full value of what is paid in property tax, then it is 4% for those making between $8,000 and $12,000 per year, 6.5% for those making between $12,000 and $16,000 per year, and 9% for those making between $16,000 and $60,000. The credit is for those who pay more than the threshold percentage assigned to their level of income. An example would be, if an applicant made $10,000 and paid $480 in property taxes, the applicant would be eligible for a credit of $80 as long as they meet the other requirements.
- Oklahoma: Applicants in Oklahoma must be a property owner over the age of 65 and file as the head of the household. The applicant must have lived in Oklahoma for the entire calendar year before filing for the credit and they must have a yearly household income under $12,000. The refund is equal to either $200 or the amount of property tax paid subtracted subtracted by the property tax cap which is set at 1% of the household income, whichever is less.
