= 2024 United States House of Representatives elections in Oregon =

- November 5, 2024

All 6 Oregon seats to the United States House of Representatives
	Majority party	Minority party
Party	Democratic	Republican
Seats before	4	2
Seats won	5	1
Seat change	▲1	▼1
Popular vote	1,151,394	912,337
Percentage	53.38%	42.30%
Swing	▲0.27%	▼2.38%

Democratic hold Democratic gain
Republican hold
Democratic
40–50%
50–60%
60–70%
70–80%
Republican
50–60%
60–70%
70–80%
80–90%

The 2024 United States House of Representatives elections in Oregon were held on November 5, 2024, to elect the six U.S. representatives from the state of Oregon, one from each of the state's congressional districts. The elections coincided with the 2024 U.S. presidential election, as well as other elections to the House of Representatives, elections to the United States Senate, and various state and local elections. The primary elections occurred on May 21, 2024.

== Overview ==
=== District ===
District	Democratic		Republican		Others		Total		Result
District	Votes	%	Votes	%	Votes	%	Votes	%	Result
District 1	241,556	68.63%	98,908	28.10%	11,527	3.27%	351,991	100.00%	Democratic hold
District 2	115,337	32.81%	224,601	63.90%	11,551	3.29%	351,489	100.00%	Republican hold
District 3	226,405	67.71%	84,344	25.22%	23,620	7.06%	334,369	100.00%	Democratic hold
District 4	195,862	51.71%	166,430	43.94%	16,473	4.35%	378,765	100.00%	Democratic hold
District 5	191,365	47.69%	180,420	44.96%	29,508	7.35%	401,293	100.00%	Democratic gain
District 6	180,869	53.34%	157,634	46.49%	562	0.17%	339,065	100.00%	Democratic hold
Total	1,151,394	53.38%	912,337	42.30%	93,241	4.32%	2,156,972	100.00%	

Popular vote
Democratic	53.38%
Republican	42.30%
Other	4.32%

House seats
Democratic	83.33%
Republican	16.67%

=== County ===
County	Democratic		Republican		Others		Margin		Total
County	#	%	#	%	#	%	#	%	Total
Baker	1,898	20.19%	7,137	75.90%	368	3.91%	-5,239	-55.72%	9,403
Benton	31,099	63.35%	15,537	31.65%	2,456	5.00%	15,562	31.70%	49,092
Clackamas	114,699	48.53%	107,364	45.43%	14,275	6.04%	7,335	3.10%	236,338
Clatsop	12,712	56.95%	8,902	39.88%	706	3.16%	3,810	17.07%	22,320
Columbia	13,013	43.67%	15,544	52.16%	1,242	4.17%	-2,531	-8.49%	29,799
Coos	13,036	37.73%	20,355	58.91%	1,161	3.36%	-7,319	-21.18%	34,552
Crook	3,415	21.67%	11,850	75.19%	496	3.15%	-8,435	-53.52%	15,761
Curry	5,358	39.57%	7,636	56.39%	547	4.04%	-2,278	-16.82%	13,541
Deschutes	60,737	49.12%	55,373	44.78%	7,539	6.10%	5,364	4.34%	123,649
Douglas	17,329	28.77%	40,612	67.43%	2,289	3.80%	-23,283	-38.66%	60,230
Gilliam	231	21.35%	804	74.31%	47	4.34%	-573	-52.96%	1,082
Grant	648	15.09%	3,476	80.95%	170	3.96%	-2,828	-65.86%	4,294
Harney	630	15.30%	3,305	80.26%	183	4.44%	-2,675	-64.96%	4,118
Hood River	7,398	61.66%	3,756	31.31%	844	7.03%	3,642	30.36%	11,998
Jackson	49,919	43.65%	61,293	53.60%	3,149	2.75%	-11,374	-9.95%	114,361
Jefferson	3,499	31.15%	7,330	65.26%	403	3.59%	-3,831	-34.11%	11,232
Josephine	15,161	32.09%	30,552	64.67%	1,528	3.23%	-15,391	-32.58%	47,241
Klamath	8,614	25.35%	24,090	70.89%	1,280	3.77%	-15,476	-45.54%	33,984
Lake	558	13.62%	3,360	82.01%	179	4.37%	-2,802	-68.39%	4,097
Lane	115,716	56.73%	79,088	38.77%	9,167	4.49%	36,628	17.96%	203,971
Lincoln	15,917	55.57%	11,411	39.84%	1,314	4.59%	4,506	15.73%	28,642
Linn	21,861	32.09%	39,581	58.11%	6,676	9.80%	-17,720	-26.01%	68,118
Malheur	2,368	22.15%	7,909	73.98%	414	3.87%	-5,541	-51.83%	10,691
Marion	70,217	46.45%	78,492	51.92%	2,469	1.63%	-8,275	-5.47%	151,178
Morrow	979	21.67%	3,338	73.88%	201	4.45%	-2,359	-52.21%	4,518
Multnomah	304,342	76.65%	68,531	17.26%	24,192	6.09%	235,811	59.39%	397,065
Polk	21,319	46.22%	24,709	53.57%	99	0.21%	-3,390	-7.35%	46,127
Sherman	183	16.31%	910	81.11%	29	2.58%	-727	-64.80%	1,122
Tillamook	7,617	49.10%	7,410	47.76%	487	3.14%	207	1.33%	15,514
Umatilla	8,164	27.60%	20,319	68.70%	1,092	3.69%	-12,155	-41.10%	29,575
Union	3,628	26.03%	9,827	70.52%	481	3.45%	-6,199	-44.48%	13,936
Wallowa	1,389	28.12%	3,398	68.79%	153	3.10%	-2,009	-40.67%	4,940
Wasco	5,439	42.86%	6,825	53.78%	426	3.36%	-1,386	-10.92%	12,690
Washington	186,663	65.50%	91,258	32.02%	7,072	2.48%	95,405	33.48%	284,993
Wheeler	172	20.87%	617	74.88%	35	4.25%	-445	-54.00%	824
Yamhill	25,466	45.49%	30,438	54.38%	72	0.13%	-4,972	-8.88%	55,976
Totals	1,151,394	53.38%	912,337	42.30%	93,241	4.32%	239,057	11.08%	2,156,972

=== Counties that flipped from Republican to Democratic ===
- Clackamas (largest city: Lake Oswego)
- Tillamook (largest city: Tillamook)

== District 1 ==
2024 Oregon's 1st congressional district election
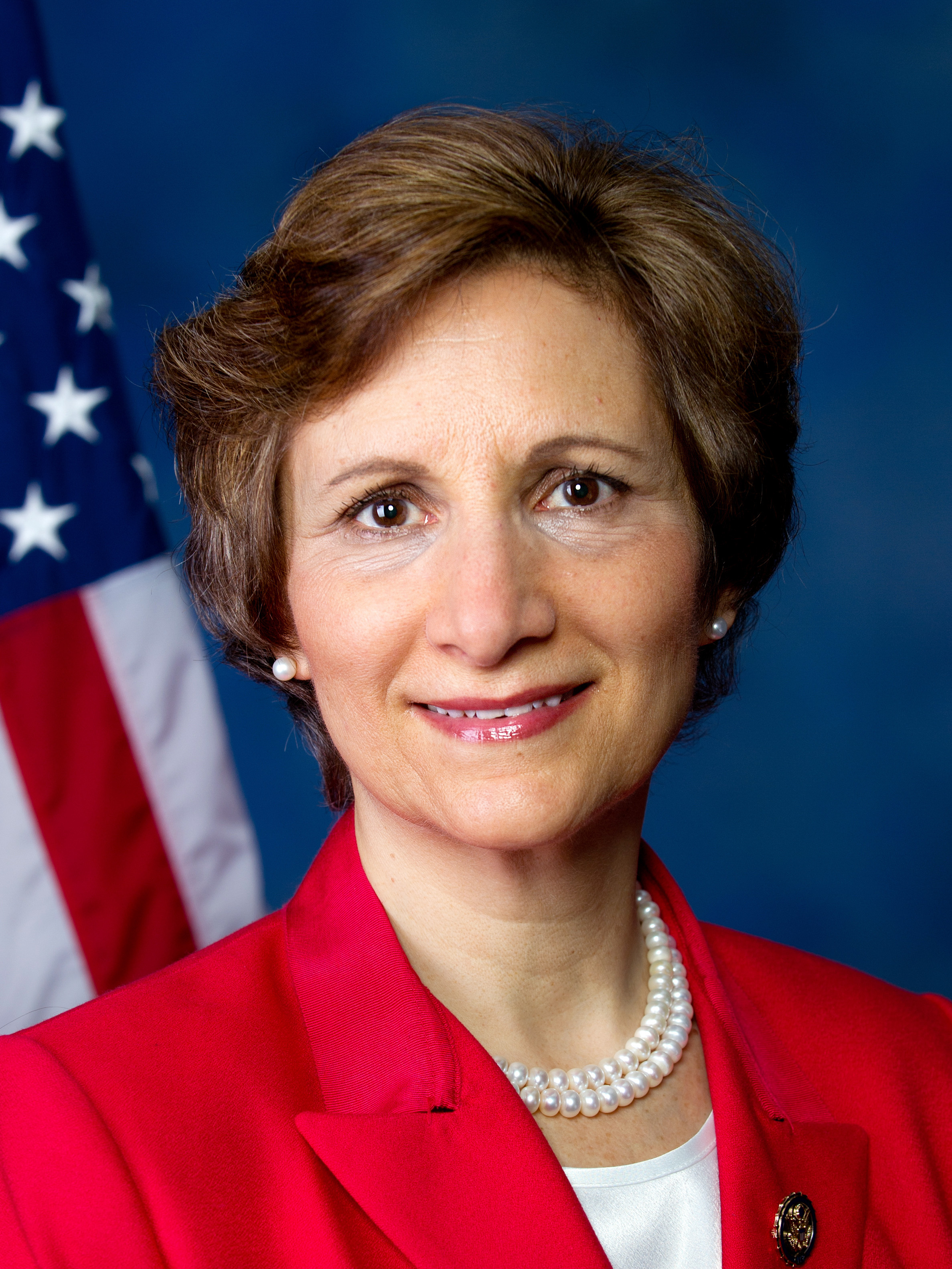

Nominee	Suzanne Bonamici	Bob Todd
Party	Democratic	Republican
Popular vote	241,556	98,908
Percentage	68.6%	28.1%
- County results Bonamici: 40–50% 50–60% 60–70% 80–90% Todd: 50–60%
U.S. Representative before election
Suzanne Bonamici
Democratic
Elected U.S. Representative
Suzanne Bonamici
Democratic

The 1st district is located in northwestern Oregon and includes the western Portland metropolitan area, including the Portland suburbs of Beaverton and Hillsboro, parts of Portland west of the Willamette River, and Tillamook County. The incumbent was Democrat Suzanne Bonamici, who was re-elected with 68.02% of the vote in 2022.

=== Democratic primary ===
==== Nominee ====
- Suzanne Bonamici, incumbent U.S. representative

==== Eliminated in primary ====
- Jamil Ahmad, engineer
- Courtney Casgraux, businesswoman

==== Endorsements ====
Suzanne Bonamici

Organizations

- AIPAC
- EMILY's List
- Feminist Majority PAC
- Humane Society Legislative Fund
- J Street PAC
- League of Conservation Voters
- National Women's Political Caucus
- Planned Parenthood Action Fund
- Population Connection Action Fund

Labor unions

- International Brotherhood of Teamsters joint council 37
- National Education Association
- Oregon AFL–CIO
- Oregon Education Association

Newspapers

- Portland Mercury
- The Skanner
- Willamette Week

==== Fundraising ====
Campaign finance reports as of May 1, 2024
Candidate	Raised	Spent	Cash on hand
Jamil Ahmad (D)	$55,000 (Note: $55,000 of this total was self-funded by Ahmad)	$3,606	$51,393
Suzanne Bonamici (D)	$572,684	$603,178	$595,266
Source: Federal Election Commission

==== Results ====
Democratic primary results
Party	Candidate	Votes	%
Democratic	Suzanne Bonamici (incumbent)	75,577	91.0
Democratic	Jamil Ahmad	5,007	6.0
Democratic	Courtney Casgraux	2,500	3.0
Total votes		83,084	100.0

=== Republican primary ===
==== Nominee ====
- Bob Todd, retiree

==== Results ====
Republican primary results
Party	Candidate	Votes	%
Republican	Bob Todd	23,993	100.0
Total votes		23,993	100.0

=== General election ===
==== Predictions ====
Source	Ranking	As of
The Cook Political Report	Solid D	February 2, 2023
Inside Elections	Solid D	September 15, 2023
Sabato's Crystal Ball	Safe D	February 23, 2023
Elections Daily	Safe D	September 7, 2023
CNalysis	Solid D	November 16, 2023

==== Endorsements ====
Suzanne Bonamici (D)

Newspapers

- Willamette Week

==== Results ====
2024 Oregon's 1st congressional district election
Party	Candidate	Votes	%
Democratic	Suzanne Bonamici (incumbent)	241,556	68.6
Republican	Bob Todd	98,908	28.1
Libertarian	Joe Christman	10,840	3.1
Write-in		687	0.2
Total votes		351,991	100.0
Democratic hold			

==== By county ====
County	Suzanne Bonamici Democratic		Bob Todd Republican		Various candidates Other parties		Margin		Total
County	#	%	#	%	#	%	#	%	Total
Clatsop	12,712	56.95%	8,902	39.88%	706	3.16%	3,810	17.07%	22,320
Columbia	13,013	43.67%	15,544	52.16%	1,242	4.17%	-2,531	-8.49%	29,799
Multnomah (part)	81,473	88.50%	8,436	9.16%	2,152	2.34%	73,037	79.34%	92,061
Tillamook	7,617	49.10%	7,410	47.76%	487	3.14%	207	1.33%	15,514
Washington (part)	126,741	65.91%	58,616	30.48%	6,940	3.61%	68,125	35.43%	192,297
Totals	241,556	68.63%	98,908	28.10%	11,527	3.27%	142,648	40.53%	351,991

== District 2 ==
2024 Oregon's 2nd congressional district election
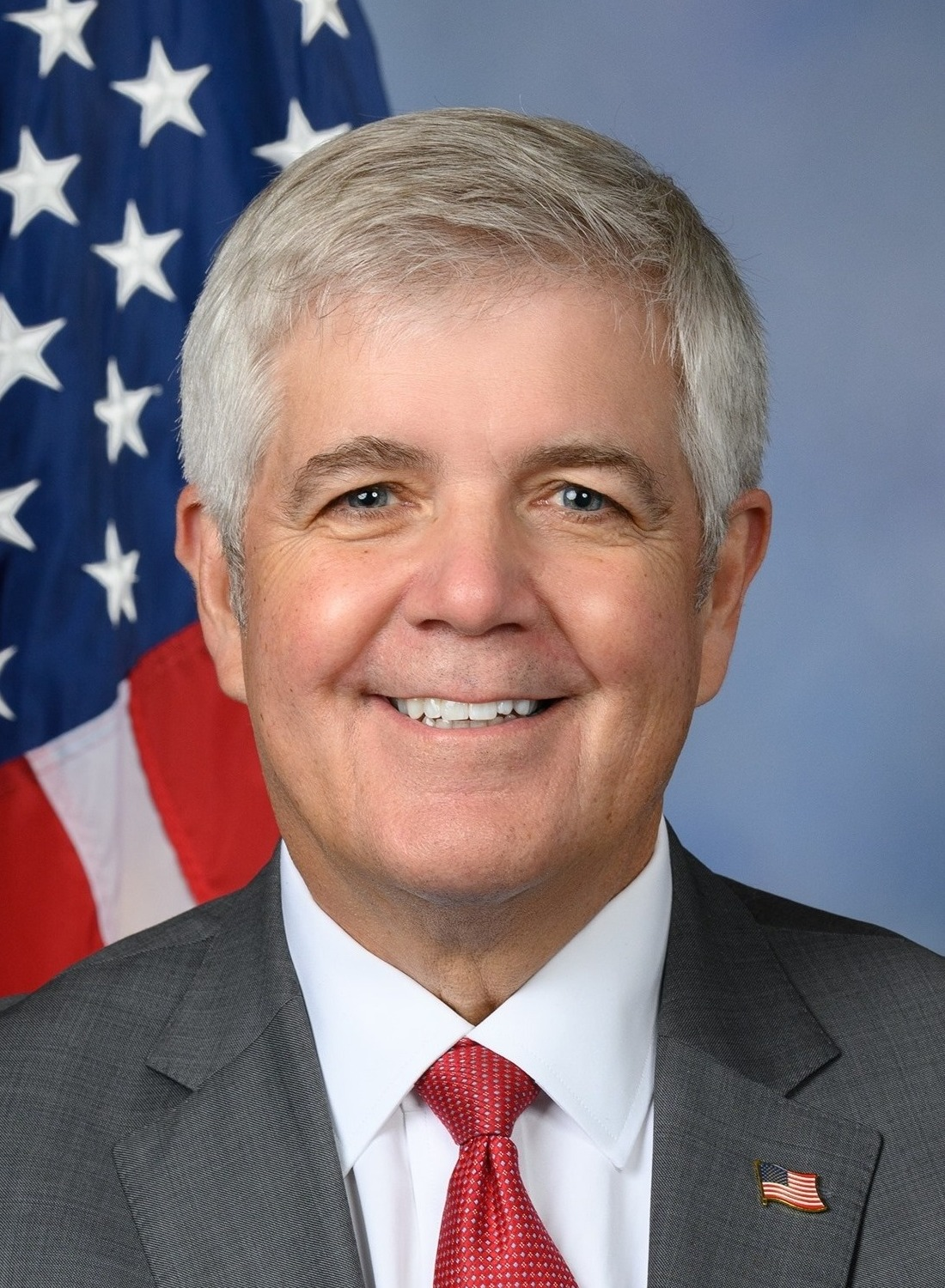

Nominee	Cliff Bentz	Dan Ruby
Party	Republican	Democratic
Popular vote	224,601	115,337
Percentage	63.9%	32.8%
- County results Bentz: 50–60% 60–70% 70–80% 80–90%
U.S. Representative before election
Cliff Bentz
Republican
Elected U.S. Representative
Cliff Bentz
Republican

The 2nd district encompasses most of Eastern Oregon and a portion of southern Oregon. The incumbent was Republican Cliff Bentz, who was re-elected with 67.60% of the vote in 2022.

=== Republican primary ===
==== Nominee ====
- Cliff Bentz, incumbent U.S. representative

==== Eliminated in primary ====
- Jason Beebe, mayor of Prineville and candidate for U.S. Senate in 2022

==== Endorsements ====
Cliff Bentz

Organizations

- National Rifle Association Political Victory Fund

==== Fundraising ====
Campaign finance reports as of May 1, 2024
Candidate	Raised	Spent	Cash on hand
Cliff Bentz (R)	$793,277	$377,339	$1,087,852
Source: Federal Election Commission

==== Results ====
Republican primary results
Party	Candidate	Votes	%
Republican	Cliff Bentz (incumbent)	73,031	81.7
Republican	Jason Beebe	16,403	18.3
Total votes		89,434	100.0

=== Democratic primary ===
==== Nominee ====
- Dan Ruby, Ashland school board member

==== Eliminated in primary ====
- Steve Laible, author and candidate for the 4th district in 2022

==== Results ====
Democratic primary results
Party	Candidate	Votes	%
Democratic	Dan Ruby	33,585	86.3
Democratic	Steve Laible	5,325	13.7
Total votes		38,910	100.0

=== Third-party and independent candidates ===
==== Declared ====
- Michael Kurt Stettler (Constitution), former chair of the Lake County Constitution Party

=== General election ===
==== Predictions ====
Source	Ranking	As of
The Cook Political Report	Solid R	February 2, 2023
Inside Elections	Solid R	September 15, 2023
Sabato's Crystal Ball	Safe R	February 23, 2023
Elections Daily	Safe R	September 7, 2023
CNalysis	Solid R	November 16, 2023

==== Results ====
2024 Oregon's 2nd congressional district election
Party	Candidate	Votes	%
Republican	Cliff Bentz (incumbent)	224,601	63.9
Democratic	Dan Ruby	115,337	32.8
Constitution	Michael Kurt Stettler	11,255	3.2
Write-in		296	0.1
Total votes		351,489	100.0
Republican hold			

==== By county ====
County	Cliff Bentz Republican		Dan Ruby Democratic		Various candidates Other parties		Margin		Total
County	#	%	#	%	#	%	#	%	Total
Baker	7,137	75.90%	1,898	20.19%	368	3.91%	5,239	55.72%	9,403
Crook	11,850	75.19%	3,415	21.67%	496	3.15%	8,435	53.52%	15,761
Deschutes (part)	9,734	62.33%	5,464	34.99%	419	2.68%	4,270	27.34%	15,617
Douglas (part)	8,536	71.03%	2,982	24.81%	500	4.16%	5,554	46.21%	12,018
Gilliam	804	74.31%	231	21.35%	47	4.34%	573	52.96%	1,082
Grant	3,476	80.95%	648	15.09%	170	3.96%	2,828	65.86%	4,294
Harney	3,305	80.26%	630	15.30%	183	4.44%	2,675	64.96%	4,118
Jackson	61,293	53.60%	49,919	43.65%	3,149	2.75%	11,374	9.95%	114,361
Jefferson (part)	7,321	65.27%	3,495	31.16%	401	3.57%	3,826	34.11%	11,217
Josephine	30,552	64.67%	15,161	32.09%	1,528	3.23%	15,391	32.58%	47,241
Klamath	24,090	70.89%	8,614	25.35%	1,280	3.77%	15,476	45.54%	33,984
Lake	3,360	82.01%	558	13.62%	179	4.37%	2,802	68.39%	4,097
Malheur	7,909	73.98%	2,368	22.15%	414	3.87%	5,541	51.83%	10,691
Morrow	3,338	73.88%	979	21.67%	201	4.45%	2,359	52.21%	4,518
Sherman	910	81.11%	183	16.31%	29	2.58%	727	64.80%	1,122
Umatilla	20,319	68.70%	8,164	27.60%	1,092	3.69%	12,155	41.10%	29,575
Union	9,827	70.52%	3,628	26.03%	481	3.45%	6,199	44.48%	13,936
Wallowa	3,398	68.79%	1,389	28.12%	153	3.10%	2,009	40.67%	4,940
Wasco	6,825	53.78%	5,439	42.86%	426	3.36%	1,386	10.92%	12,690
Wheeler	617	74.88%	172	20.87%	35	4.25%	445	54.00%	824
Totals	224,601	63.90%	115,337	32.81%	11,551	3.29%	109,264	31.09%	351,489

== District 3 ==
2024 Oregon's 3rd congressional district election
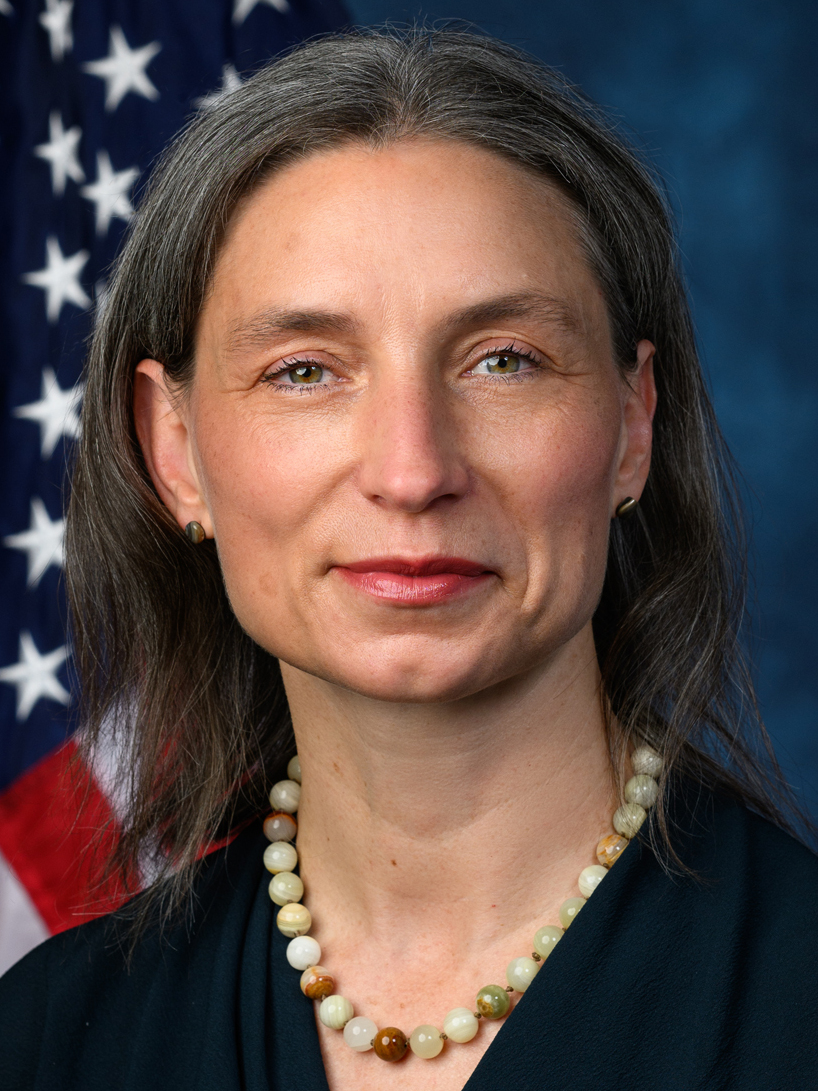

Nominee	Maxine Dexter	Joanna Harbour
Party	Democratic	Republican
Popular vote	226,405	84,344
Percentage	67.7%	25.2%
- County results Dexter: 60–70% 70–80% Harbour: 50–60%
U.S. Representative before election
Earl Blumenauer
Democratic
Elected U.S. Representative
Maxine Dexter
Democratic

This district contains the eastern Portland metro area, covering Portland and Gresham, as well as northeastern Clackamas County and Hood River County. The incumbent was Democrat Earl Blumenauer, who was re-elected with 70.04% of the vote in 2022. On October 30, 2023, Blumenauer announced that he would not seek re-election.

=== Democratic primary ===
==== Nominee ====
- Maxine Dexter, state representative from the 33rd district (2020–present)

==== Eliminated in primary ====
- Ricardo Barajas, dental office manager and perennial candidate
- Nolan Bylenga, activist
- Susheela Jayapal, former Multnomah County commissioner from the 2nd district (2019–2023) and sister of U.S. Representative Pramila Jayapal
- Michael Jonas, attorney
- Eddy Morales, Gresham city councilor

==== Declined ====
- Earl Blumenauer, incumbent U.S. representative
- Kate Brown, former governor of Oregon (2015–2023)
- Deborah Kafoury, former Multnomah County chair (2015–2022)
- Travis Nelson, state representative from the 44th district (2022–present) (running for re-election)
- Steve Novick, former Portland city commissioner (2013–2017) and candidate for U.S. Senate in 2008 (running for Portland City Council)
- Tobias Read, Oregon state treasurer (2017–present) (running for Secretary of State)
- Thuy Tran, state representative from the 45th district (2023–present) (running for re-election)

==== Endorsements ====
Maxine Dexter

Statewide officials

- John Kitzhaber, former governor of Oregon (1995–2003, 2011–2015)
- Ted Kulongoski, former governor of Oregon (2003–2011)

State legislators

- Dan Rayfield, Attorney General of Oregon (2024–present), and former speaker of the Oregon House of Representatives (2022–2024)

Individuals

- Shannon Watts, gun-control activist

Newspapers

- The Oregonian
- Willamette Week

Organizations

- 314 Action
- Everytown for Gun Safety
- National Organization for Women PAC
- Vote Mama

Labor unions

- International Brotherhood of Teamsters joint council 37
Susheela Jayapal

U.S. senators

- Bernie Sanders, Vermont (2007–present)

U.S. representatives

- Pramila Jayapal, U.S. representative from Washington's 7th congressional district (2017–present) (candidate's sister)
- Ro Khanna, U.S. representative from California's 17th congressional district (2017–present)
- Grace Meng, U.S. representative from New York's 6th congressional district (2013–present)
- Alexandria Ocasio-Cortez, U.S. representative from New York's 14th congressional district (2019-present)
- Mark Pocan, U.S. representative from Wisconsin's 2nd congressional district (2013–present)
- David Scott, U.S. representative from Georgia's 13th congressional district (2003–present)

State legislators

- Kayse Jama, state senator from the 24th district (2021–present)
- Hoa Nguyen, state representative from the 48th district (2023–present)
- Tawna Sanchez, state representative from the 43rd district (2017–present)

Local officials

- Duncan Hwang, Metro councilor from the 6th district (2022–present)
- Mary Nolan, Metro councilor from the 5th district (2021–present) and former majority leader of the Oregon House of Representatives (2009–2011)
- Jessica Vega Pederson, Multnomah County chair (2023–present) and former state representative from the 47th district (2013–2017)

Individuals

- Howie Klein, former president of Reprise Records (1989–2001) and adjunct professor at McGill University
- Heather Digby Parton, political blogger

Newspapers

- Portland Mercury
- The Skanner

Organizations

- AAPI Victory Fund
- ASPIRE PAC
- End Citizens United
- Friends of the Earth Action
- Our Revolution

Labor unions

- United Auto Workers
Eddy Morales

U.S. representatives

- Becca Balint, U.S. representative from Vermont's at-large congressional district (2023–present)
- Linda Sánchez, U.S. representative from California's 38th congressional district (2003–present)
- Mark Takano, U.S. representative from California's 39th congressional district (2013–present)
- Ritchie Torres, U.S. representative from New York's 15th congressional district (2021–present)

State legislators

- Stacey Abrams, former minority leader of the Georgia House of Representatives

Organizations

- CHC BOLD PAC
- Equality PAC
- Human Rights Campaign
- Latino Victory Fund
- LGBTQ Victory Fund

Labor unions

- Association of Flight Attendants
- National Education Association
- Oregon Education Association
Earl Blumenauer (declined to run)

Organizations

- Population Connection Action Fund
Declined to endorse

U.S. representatives

- Earl Blumenauer, U.S. representative from Oregon's 3rd congressional district (1996–present)

==== Fundraising ====
Campaign finance reports as of May 1, 2024
Candidate	Raised	Spent	Cash on hand
Maxine Dexter (D)	$918,859	$551,936	$366,922
Susheela Jayapal (D)	$772,624	$543,665	$228,959
Michael Jonas (D)	$17,327	$16,426	$900
Eddy Morales (D)	$606,343	$459,072	$147,271
Source: Federal Election Commission

==== Debate ====
2024 Oregon's 3rd congressional district Democratic primary debate
No.	Date	Host	Moderator	Link	Democratic	Democratic	Democratic
Key: P Participant A Absent N Not invited I Invited W Withdrawn							
Key: P Participant A Absent N Not invited I Invited W Withdrawn					Maxine Dexter	Susheela Jayapal	Eddy Morales
1	Feb. 28, 2024	City Club of Portland; Multnomah Democrats	Chabre Vickers	YouTube	P	P	P

==== Results ====
Results by county: Dexter–40–50% Dexter–50–60%

Democratic primary results
Party	Candidate	Votes	%
Democratic	Maxine Dexter	47,254	47.5
Democratic	Susheela Jayapal	32,793	33.0
Democratic	Eddy Morales	13,391	13.5
Democratic	Michael Jonas	2,359	2.4
Democratic	Nolan Bylenga	2,138	2.2
Democratic	Rachel Lydia Rand	856	0.9
Democratic	Ricardo Barajas	649	0.7
Total votes		99,440	100.0

=== Republican primary ===
==== Nominee ====
- Joanna Harbour, attorney and nominee for this district in 2020 and 2022

==== Eliminated in primary ====
- Gary Dye, chemical engineer
- Teresa Orwig, nurse

==== Endorsements ====
Declined to endorse

Newspapers

- The Oregonian

==== Fundraising ====
Campaign finance reports as of May 1, 2024
Candidate	Raised	Spent	Cash on hand
Joanna Harbour (R)	$8,226	$4,670	$3,556
Teresa Orwig (R)	$8,735 (Note: $8,000 of this total was self-funded by Orwig)	$8,105	$630
Source: Federal Election Commission

==== Results ====
Republican primary results
Party	Candidate	Votes	%
Republican	Joanna Harbour	13,948	55.5
Republican	Gary Dye	6,869	27.3
Republican	Teresa Orwig	4,303	17.1
Total votes		25,120	100.0

=== Third-party and independent candidates ===
==== Declared ====
- David Frosch (Constitution Party, New Era Party USA), pro-worker activist
- Joe Meyer (Pacific Green), research scientist
- David Walker (Independent), nurse practitioner and perennial candidate

=== General election ===
==== Predictions ====
Source	Ranking	As of
The Cook Political Report	Solid D	February 2, 2023
Inside Elections	Solid D	September 15, 2023
Sabato's Crystal Ball	Safe D	February 23, 2023
Elections Daily	Safe D	September 7, 2023
CNalysis	Solid D	November 16, 2023

==== Endorsements ====
Maxine Dexter (D)

Organizations

- Defend the Vote
- EMILY's List

Labor unions

- AFL-CIO
- American Federation of State, County and Municipal Employees
- American Federation of Teachers
- International Association of Bridge, Structural, Ornamental and Reinforcing Iron Workers Local 29
- International Association of Fire Fighters
- International Association of Sheet Metal, Air, Rail and Transportation Workers Local 16
- International Brotherhood of Electrical Workers Local 48
- International Brotherhood of Teamsters Joint Council 37
- Laborers' International Union of North America
- National Association of Letter Carriers
- Oregon Education Association
- Oregon Federation of Nurses & Health Professionals
- Oregon Nurses Association
- Oregon School Employees Association
- Service Employees International Union
- United Association Local 290
- United Brotherhood of Carpenters and Joiners of America
- United Food and Commercial Workers Local 555
- United Steelworkers

Newspapers

- The Oregonian
- Portland Mercury
- The Skanner
- Willamette Week

==== Results ====
2024 Oregon's 3rd congressional district election
Party	Candidate	Votes	%
Democratic	Maxine Dexter	226,405	67.7
Republican	Joanna Harbour	84,344	25.2
Independent	David Walker	10,245	3.1
Pacific Green	Joe Meyer	10,106	3.0
Constitution	David Frosch	2,459	0.7
Write-in		810	0.2
Total votes		334,369	100.0
Democratic hold			

==== By county ====
County	Maxine Dexter Democratic		Joanna Harbour Republican		Various candidates Other parties		Margin		Total
County	#	%	#	%	#	%	#	%	Total
Clackamas (part)	18,120	39.40%	25,409	55.25%	2,459	5.35%	-7,289	-15.85%	45,988
Hood River	7,398	61.66%	3,756	31.31%	844	7.03%	3,642	30.36%	11,998
Multnomah (part)	200,887	72.68%	55,179	19.96%	20,317	7.35%	145,708	52.72%	276,383
Totals	226,405	67.71%	84,344	25.22%	23,620	7.06%	142,061	42.49%	334,369

== District 4 ==
2024 Oregon's 4th congressional district election
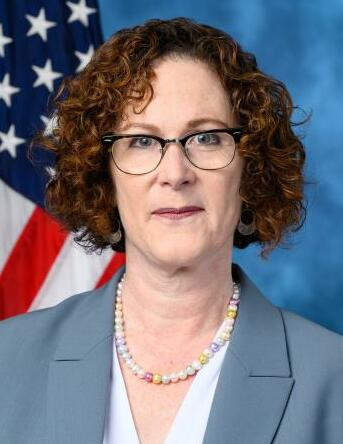

Nominee	Val Hoyle	Monique DeSpain
Party	Democratic	Republican
Popular vote	195,862	166,430
Percentage	51.7%	43.9%
- County results Hoyle: 50–60% 60–70% DeSpain: 50–60% 60–70%
U.S. Representative before election
Val Hoyle
Democratic
Elected U.S. Representative
Val Hoyle
Democratic

The 4th district includes the southern Willamette Valley and parts of the South and Central Coasts, including Eugene, Corvallis, and Roseburg. The incumbent was Democrat Val Hoyle, who was elected with 50.61% of the vote in 2022.

=== Democratic primary ===
==== Nominee ====
- Val Hoyle, incumbent U.S. representative

==== Endorsements ====
Val Hoyle

Organizations

- Council for a Livable World
- Everytown for Gun Safety Action Fund
- Giffords
- Humane Society Legislative Fund
- Jewish Democratic Council of America
- League of Conservation Voters
- National Women's Political Caucus
- Planned Parenthood Action Fund
- Population Connection Action Fund

Labor unions

- Association of Flight Attendants
- International Brotherhood of Teamsters joint council 37
- National Education Association
- Oregon Education Association

Newspapers

- Eugene Weekly

==== Fundraising ====
Campaign finance reports as of May 1, 2024
Candidate	Raised	Spent	Cash on hand
Val Hoyle (D)	$1,283,581	$704,295	$619,333
Source: Federal Election Commission

==== Results ====
Democratic primary results
Party	Candidate	Votes	%
Democratic	Val Hoyle (incumbent)	73,444	100.0
Total votes		73,444	100.0

=== Republican primary ===
==== Nominee ====
- Monique DeSpain, attorney

==== Eliminated in primary ====
- Amy Ryan Courser, former Keizer city councilor and nominee for the 5th district in 2020

==== Endorsements ====
Monique DeSpain

U.S. representatives

- Cliff Bentz, OR-2 (2021–present)

Organizations

- Maggie's List

==== Fundraising ====
Campaign finance reports as of May 1, 2024
Candidate	Raised	Spent	Cash on hand
Monique DeSpain (R)	$272,837 (Note: $12,000 of this total was self-funded by DeSpain)	$203,488	$69,348
Amy Ryan Courser (R)	$27,401	$25,466	$2,019
Source: Federal Election Commission

==== Results ====
Republican primary results
Party	Candidate	Votes	%
Republican	Monique DeSpain	31,436	58.4
Republican	Amy Ryan Courser	22,418	41.6
Total votes		53,854	100.0

=== Third-party and independent candidates ===
==== Declared ====
- Justin Filip (Pacific Green), university program manager

=== General election ===
==== Predictions ====
Source	Ranking	As of
The Cook Political Report	Likely D	February 2, 2023
Inside Elections	Likely D	September 15, 2023
Sabato's Crystal Ball	Likely D	February 23, 2023
Elections Daily	Likely D	September 7, 2023
CNalysis	Solid D	November 16, 2023

==== Results ====
2024 Oregon's 4th congressional district election
Party	Candidate	Votes	%
Democratic	Val Hoyle (incumbent)	195,862	51.7
Republican	Monique DeSpain	166,430	43.9
Pacific Green	Justin Filip	10,315	2.7
Libertarian	Dan Bahlen	5,704	1.5
Write-in		454	0.1
Total votes		378,765	100.0
Democratic hold			

==== By county ====
County	Val Hoyle Democratic		Monique DeSpain Republican		Various candidates Other parties		Margin		Total
County	#	%	#	%	#	%	#	%	Total
Benton	31,099	63.35%	15,537	31.65%	2,456	5.00%	15,562	31.70%	49,092
Coos	13,036	37.73%	20,355	58.91%	1,161	3.36%	-7,319	-21.18%	34,552
Curry	5,358	39.57%	7,636	56.39%	547	4.04%	-2,278	-16.82%	13,541
Douglas (part)	14,347	29.76%	32,076	66.53%	1,789	3.71%	-17,729	-36.77%	48,212
Lane	115,716	56.73%	79,088	38.77%	9,167	4.49%	36,628	17.96%	203,971
Lincoln	15,917	55.57%	11,411	39.84%	1,314	4.59%	4,506	15.73%	28,642
Linn (part)	389	51.52%	327	43.31%	39	5.17%	62	8.21%	755
Totals	195,862	51.71%	166,430	43.94%	16,473	4.35%	29,432	7.77%	378,765

== District 5 ==
2024 Oregon's 5th congressional district election
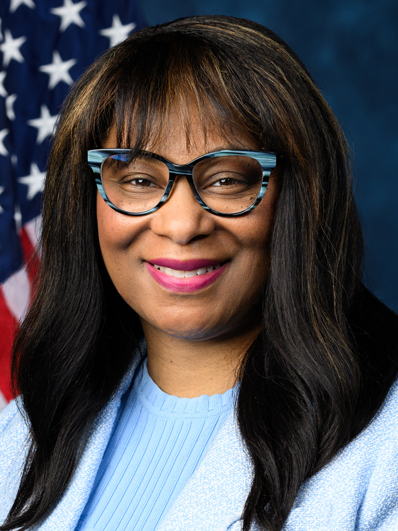

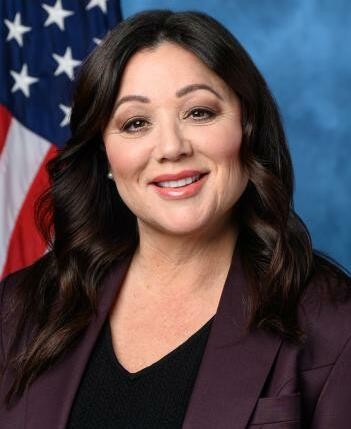
Nominee	Janelle Bynum	Lori Chavez-DeRemer
Party	Democratic	Republican
Popular vote	191,365	180,420
Percentage	47.7%	45.0%
- County results Bynum: 40–50% 50–60% 70–80% Chavez-DeRemer: 50–60% 60–70%
U.S. Representative before election
Lori Chavez-DeRemer
Republican
Elected U.S. Representative
Janelle Bynum
Democratic

The 5th district includes portions of the Portland suburbs, also stretching southwards through the eastern parts of Marion and Linn counties to Bend. The incumbent was Republican Lori Chavez-DeRemer, who flipped the district and was elected with 51.04% of the vote in 2022.

=== Republican primary ===
==== Nominee ====
- Lori Chavez-DeRemer, incumbent U.S. representative

==== Endorsements ====
Lori Chavez-DeRemer

Organizations

- AIPAC
- BIPAC
- Log Cabin Republicans PAC
- Maggie's List
- Republican Jewish Coalition

Labor unions

- American Federation of Government Employees
- Association of Flight Attendants
- International Association of Bridge, Structural, Ornamental and Reinforcing Iron Workers Local 29
- International Brotherhood of Teamsters joint council 37(co-endorsement with Bynum)
- International Union of Painters and Allied Trades District Council 5

==== Fundraising ====
Campaign finance reports as of May 1, 2024
Candidate	Raised	Spent	Cash on hand
Lori Chavez-DeRemer (R)	$3,334,091	$1,437,986	$1,905,566
Source: Federal Election Commission

==== Results ====
Republican primary results
Party	Candidate	Votes	%
Republican	Lori Chavez-DeRemer (incumbent)	54,458	100.0
Total votes		54,458	100.0

=== Democratic primary ===
==== Nominee ====
- Janelle Bynum, state representative from the 39th district (2017–2025)

==== Eliminated in primary ====
- Jamie McLeod-Skinner, former director of the Oregon Office of Resilience and Emergency Management, nominee for this district in 2022, candidate for Oregon Secretary of State in 2020, and nominee for the 2nd district in 2018

===== Withdrawn =====
- Matthew Davie, tech executive
- Kevin Easton, campaign consultant, former congressional aide, and candidate for the 4th district in 2022 (endorsed McLeod-Skinner)
- Lynn Peterson, president of the Metro Council (2019–present) (endorsed Bynum)

===== Declined =====
- Kurt Schrader, former U.S. representative

==== Endorsements ====
Janelle Bynum

U.S. representatives

- Earl Blumenauer, OR-03 (1996–2025)
- Suzanne Bonamici, OR-01 (2012–present)
- Pat Ryan, NY-18 (2022–present)
- Andrea Salinas, OR-06 (2023–present)

Statewide officials

- Kate Brown, former governor of Oregon (2015–2023)
- Tina Kotek, governor of Oregon (2023–present)
- Tobias Read, Oregon Secretary of State (2025–present)
- Barbara Roberts, former governor of Oregon (1991–1995) (previously endorsed Peterson)
- Ellen Rosenblum, former Oregon attorney general (2012–2024)

State legislators

- Julie Fahey, speaker of the Oregon House of Representatives (2024–present)
- James Manning Jr., president pro tempore of the Oregon State Senate (2021–present)
- Mark Meek, state senator from the 20th district (2023–present)
- Travis Nelson, state representative from the 44th district (2022–present)
- Dan Rayfield, former speaker of the Oregon House of Representatives (2022–2024) and state representative from the 16th district (2015–present)
- Janeen Sollman, state senator from the 15th district (2022–present)
- Rob Wagner, president of the Oregon State Senate (2023–present)

Local officials

- Lynn Peterson, president of the Metro Council (2019–present) and former candidate in this election

Newspapers

- The Oregonian
- Portland Mercury
- The Skanner
- The Source Weekly
- Willamette Week

Organizations

- 314 Action
- Congressional Black Caucus
- DCCC Red to Blue
- Democratic Majority for Israel
- EMILY's List
- NewDem Action Fund

Labor unions

- International Brotherhood of Teamsters joint council 37(co-endorsement with DeRemer)
Jamie McLeod-Skinner

U.S. representatives

- Mark Takano, CA-39 (2013–present)
- Ritchie Torres, NY-15 (2021–present)

State legislators

- Mark Gamba, state representative from the 41st district (2023–present)
- Jeff Golden, state senator from the 3rd district (2019–present)
- Jan Lee, former state representative from the 10th district (2001–2003)
- Deb Patterson, state senator from the 10th district (2021–present)

Local officials

- Annise Parker, president and CEO of LGBTQ Victory Fund (2017–present) and former mayor of Houston (2010–2016)

Labor unions

- International Association of Heat and Frost Insulators and Allied Workers Local 36
- Oregon Education Association
- United Food and Commercial Workers Local 555

Organizations

- Equality PAC
- LGBTQ Victory Fund
- LPAC
- Patriotic Millionaires
- Vote Common Good

Individuals

- Kevin Easton, former candidate in this election
Lynn Peterson (withdrawn)

U.S. representatives

- Peter DeFazio, former OR-04 (1987–2023)

Statewide officials

- Barbara Roberts, former governor of Oregon (1991–1995) (switched endorsement to Bynum)

Local officials

- Mary Nolan, Metro councilor from the 5th district (2021–present) and former majority leader of the Oregon House of Representatives (2009–2011)
- Jessica Vega Pederson, Multnomah County chair (2023–present) and former state representative from the 47th district (2013–2017)

==== Polling ====
Poll source	Date(s) administered	Sample size (Note: Key: A – all adults RV – registered voters LV – likely voters V – unclear)	Margin of error	Janelle Bynum	Jamie McLeod- Skinner	Other	Undecided
Brilliant Corners (D) (Note: Poll commissioned by Bynum's campaign)	April 26–28, 2024	402 (LV)	± 4.9%	37%	34%	–	29%
Brilliant Corners (D)	February 2024	?	?	15%	38%	47% (Note: The remaining 47% was split, with some supporting Matthew Davie and the rest undecided)	
RMG Research (Note: Poll commissioned by U.S. Term Limits, whose term limits pledge was signed by McLeod-Skinner)	November 14–17, 2023	300 (LV)	± 5.7%	9%	41%	6% (Note: Lynn Peterson with 4%; "Someone else" with 2%)	44%
GBAO Strategies (D) (Note: Poll commissioned by McLeod-Skinner's campaign)	May 30 – June 1, 2023	400 (LV)	± 4.9%	9%	50%	7% (Note: Lynn Peterson with 5%; Kevin Easton with 2%)	32%

Hypothetical polling

Janelle Bynum vs. Jamie McLeod-Skinner

Poll source	Date(s) administered	Sample size	Margin of error	Janelle Bynum	Jamie McLeod-Skinner	Undecided
GBAO Strategies (D)	May 30 – June 1, 2023	400 (LV)	± 4.9%	19%	57%	24%

Jamie McLeod-Skinner vs. Lynn Peterson

Poll source	Date(s) administered	Sample size	Margin of error	Jamie McLeod-Skinner	Lynn Peterson	Undecided
GBAO Strategies (D)	May 30 – June 1, 2023	400 (LV)	± 4.9%	59%	16%	25%

==== Fundraising ====
Campaign finance reports as of May 1, 2024
Candidate	Raised	Spent	Cash on hand
Janelle Bynum (D)	$1,111,199	$771,563	$339,636
Jamie McLeod-Skinner (D)	$725,519	$580,581	$191,056
Source: Federal Election Commission

==== Debates ====
2024 Oregon's 5th congressional district Democratic primary debates
No.	Date	Host	Moderator	Link	Democratic	Democratic
Key: P Participant A Absent N Not invited I Invited W Withdrawn						
Key: P Participant A Absent N Not invited I Invited W Withdrawn					Janelle Bynum	Jamie McLeod-Skinner
1	Apr. 11, 2024	City Club of Portland	Les Zaitz	YouTube	P	P
2	Apr. 16, 2024	Central Oregon Daily; City Club of Central Oregon; League of Women Voters of Deschutes County	Brooke Snavely	YouTube	P	P

==== Results ====
Democratic primary results
Party	Candidate	Votes	%
Democratic	Janelle Bynum	55,473	69.9
Democratic	Jamie McLeod-Skinner	23,905	30.1
Total votes		79,378	100.0

=== Third-party and independent candidates ===
==== Declared ====
- Sonja Feintich (Libertarian), farmer
- Brett Smith (Independent), maintenance director
- Andrea Townsend (Pacific Green)

=== General election ===
==== Predictions ====
Source	Ranking	As of
The Cook Political Report	Tossup	February 2, 2023
Inside Elections	Tilt D (flip)	October 31, 2024
Sabato's Crystal Ball	Lean D (flip)	November 4, 2024
Elections Daily	Lean D (flip)	November 4, 2024
CNalysis	Tilt D (flip)	November 4, 2024

==== Endorsements ====
Lori Chavez-DeRemer (R)

Organizations

- U.S. Chamber of Commerce
Janelle Bynum (D)

Organizations

- Everytown for Gun Safety
- Jewish Democratic Council of America

Newspapers

- The Oregonian
- Willamette Week

=== Polling ===
Poll source	Date(s) administered	Sample size	Margin of error	Janelle Bynum (D)	Lori Chavez- DeRemer (R)	Other	Undecided
Brilliant Corners (D)	September 16–18, 2024	502 (LV)	–	47%	45%	–	8%
Noble Predictive Insights (Note: Poll sponsored by Inside Elections)	August 26–28, 2024	419 (LV)	± 4.8%	43%	42%	–	15%
Noble Predictive Insights	August 26–28, 2024	419 (LV)	± 4.8%	41%	39%	1% (Note: Andrew Aasen (I) with 1%)	19%

==== Results ====
2024 Oregon's 5th congressional district election
Party	Candidate	Votes	%
Democratic	Janelle Bynum	191,365	47.7
Republican	Lori Chavez-DeRemer (incumbent)	180,420	45.0
Independent	Brett Smith	18,665	4.7
Libertarian	Sonja Feintech	6,193	1.5
Pacific Green	Andrea Townsend	4,155	1.0
Write-in		495	0.1
Total votes		401,293	100.0
Democratic gain from Republican			

==== By county ====
County	Lori Chavez-DeRemer Republican		Janelle Bynum Democratic		Various candidates Other parties		Margin		Total
County	#	%	#	%	#	%	#	%	Total
Clackamas (part)	72,922	43.26%	83,886	49.76%	11,775	6.98%	10,964	6.50%	168,583
Deschutes (part)	45,639	42.25%	55,273	51.16%	7,120	6.59%	9,634	8.92%	108,032
Jefferson (part)	9	60.00%	4	26.67%	2	13.33%	-5	-33.33%	15
Linn (part)	39,254	58.27%	21,472	31.88%	6,637	9.85%	-17,782	-26.40%	67,363
Marion (part)	17,680	61.65%	8,748	30.50%	2,251	7.85%	-8,932	-31.14%	28,679
Multnomah (part)	4,916	17.18%	21,982	76.80%	1,723	6.02%	17,066	59.63%	28,621
Totals	180,420	44.96%	191,365	47.69%	29,508	7.35%	10,945	2.73%	401,293

== District 6 ==
2024 Oregon's 6th congressional district election
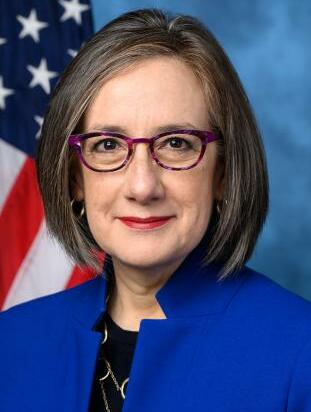

Nominee	Andrea Salinas	Mike Erickson
Party	Democratic	Republican
Popular vote	180,869	157,634
Percentage	53.3%	46.5%
- County results Salinas: 50–60% 60–70% Erickson: 50–60%
U.S. Representative before election
Andrea Salinas
Democratic
Elected U.S. Representative
Andrea Salinas
Democratic

The 6th district consists of Polk County and Yamhill County, in addition to portions of Marion County (including the state capital, Salem), Clackamas County, and Washington County. The incumbent was Democrat Andrea Salinas, who was elected with 50.08% of the vote in 2022.

=== Democratic primary ===
==== Nominee ====
- Andrea Salinas, incumbent U.S. representative

==== Eliminated in primary ====
- Cody Reynolds, U.S. Army veteran and perennial candidate

==== Endorsements ====
Andrea Salinas

Statewide officials

- Gretchen Whitmer, governor of Michigan (2019–present)

Organizations

- AIPAC
- Brady PAC
- Democratic Majority for Israel
- EMILY's List
- Everytown for Gun Safety Action Fund
- Giffords
- J Street PAC
- Jewish Democratic Council of America
- League of Conservation Voters
- NARAL Pro-Choice America
- National Organization for Women PAC
- Planned Parenthood Action Fund
- Population Connection Action Fund

Labor unions

- International Brotherhood of Teamsters joint council 37
- National Education Association
- Oregon AFL–CIO
- Oregon Education Association
- United Auto Workers

Newspapers

- Willamette Week

==== Fundraising ====
Campaign finance reports as of May 1, 2024
Candidate	Raised	Spent	Cash on hand
Andrea Salinas (D)	$2,556,824	$863,432	$1,699,677
Source: Federal Election Commission

==== Results ====
Democratic primary results
Party	Candidate	Votes	%
Democratic	Andrea Salinas	52,509	87.6
Democratic	Cody Reynolds	7,463	12.4
Total votes		59,972	100.0

=== Republican primary ===
==== Nominee ====
- Mike Erickson, logistics consultant, nominee for this district in 2022, and nominee for the 5th district in 2006 and 2008

==== Eliminated in primary ====
- David Burch, candidate for governor in 2022
- Conrad Herold
- David Russ, mayor of Dundee and candidate for this district in 2022

==== Withdrawn ====
- Denyc Boles, former state senator from the 10th district (2019–2021)

==== Endorsements ====
Mike Erickson

Newspapers

- Willamette Week

==== Fundraising ====
Campaign finance reports as of May 1, 2024
Candidate	Raised	Spent	Cash on hand
Mike Erickson (R)	$140,962 (Note: $2,400 of this total was self-funded by Erickson)	$43,311	$101,190
David Russ (R)	$3,460 (Note: $3,140 of this total was self-funded by Russ)	$3,140	$320
Source: Federal Election Commission

==== Results ====
Republican primary results
Party	Candidate	Votes	%
Republican	Mike Erickson	37,497	74.3
Republican	David Russ	10,908	21.6
Republican	David Burch	1,447	2.9
Republican	Conrad Herold	628	1.2
Total votes		50,480	100.0

=== General election ===
==== Predictions ====
Source	Ranking	As of
The Cook Political Report	Likely D	November 1, 2024
Inside Elections	Solid D	October 10, 2024
Sabato's Crystal Ball	Likely D	February 23, 2023
Elections Daily	Likely D	September 7, 2023
CNalysis	Very Likely D	November 16, 2023

==== Endorsements ====
Andrea Salinas (D)

Newspapers

- The Oregonian
- Willamette Week

==== Polling ====
Poll source	Date(s) administered	Sample size	Margin of error	Andrea Salinas (D)	Mike Erickson (R)	Undecided
Cygnal (R) (Note: Poll sponsored by the National Republican Congressional Committee and Erickson's campaign)	August 7–9, 2024	516 (LV)	± 4.3%	45%	43%	13%

==== Results ====
2024 Oregon's 6th congressional district election
Party	Candidate	Votes	%
Democratic	Andrea Salinas (incumbent)	180,869	53.3
Republican	Mike Erickson	157,634	46.5
Write-in		562	0.2
Total votes		339,065	100.0
Democratic hold			

==== By county ====
County	Andrea Salinas Democratic		Mike Erickson Republican		Write-in Various		Margin		Total
County	#	%	#	%	#	%	#	%	Total
Clackamas (part)	12,693	58.31%	9,033	41.50%	41	0.19%	3,660	16.81%	21,767
Marion (part)	61,469	50.18%	60,812	49.64%	218	0.18%	657	0.54%	122,499
Polk	21,319	46.22%	24,709	53.57%	99	0.21%	-3,390	-7.35%	46,127
Washington (part)	59,922	64.64%	32,642	35.21%	132	0.14%	27,280	29.43%	92,696
Yamhill	25,466	45.49%	30,438	54.38%	72	0.13%	-4,972	-8.88%	55,976
Totals	180,869	53.34%	157,634	46.49%	562	0.17%	23,235	6.85%	339,065

== Notes ==
Partisan clients
