= Hooley (surname) =

Hooley or Hoolie is a surname. Notable people with the surname include:

- Christopher Hooley (1928–2018), British mathematician
- Darlene Hooley (born 1939), American politician
- E. Purnell Hooley (1860–1942), Welsh inventor
- E. T. Hooley (1842–1903), explorer, pastoralist and politician in Western Australia
- Ernest Terah Hooley (1859–1947), English and financier and business promoter
- Frank Hooley (1923–2015), British politician
- Teresa Hooley (1888–1973), English poet
- Peter Hooley (born 1992), Australian basketball player
- Terri Hooley (born 1948), Northern Irish record label owner
- Reginald Hooley (1865–1923) English amateur paleontologist
- Richard M. Hooley (1822–1893), American theatrical manager

== Other people ==
- Hooley Smith (1903–1963), Canadian ice hockey player
- Jim "Hoolie" DeCaire of Da Yoopers

== Fictional characters ==
- Miss Hoolie, a character from the British children's television programme Balamory, portrayed by Julie Wilson Nimmo

== See also ==
- Holey (disambiguation)
- Hoole (surname)
- Sylvester Ahola (1902–1995), American jazz trumpeter, nicknamed "Hooley"
