= Lynn Peterson =

Lynn Peterson may refer to:

- Lynn Peterson (American politician)
- Lynn Peterson (Canadian politician)
