= David Wu =

American politician (born 1955)

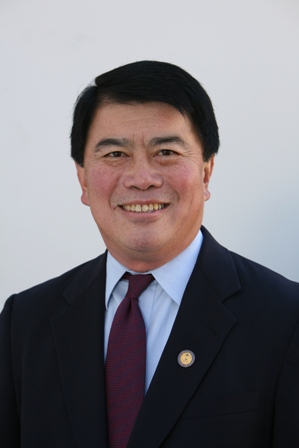
- Official portrait, 2006

Member of the U.S. House of Representatives from Oregon's 1st district
- In office January 3, 1999 – August 3, 2011
- Preceded by: Elizabeth Furse
- Succeeded by: Suzanne Bonamici

Personal details
- Born: April 8, 1955 (age 71) Hsinchu, Taiwan
- Party: Democratic
- Spouse: Michelle Reinmiller (m. 1996; div. 2009)
- Education: Stanford University (BS); Harvard University; Yale University (JD)

Chinese name
- Traditional Chinese: 吳振偉
- Simplified Chinese: 吴振伟
Transcriptions
Standard Mandarin
- Hanyu Pinyin: Wú Zhènwěi

David Wu (born April 8, 1955) is an American politician who served as the U.S. representative for Oregon's 1st congressional district from 1999 to 2011. He is a member of the Democratic Party.

Wu was born in Taiwan and immigrated to the United States, where he graduated from Stanford University, attended Harvard Medical School, and graduated from Yale Law School. He was the first Taiwanese American to serve in the House of Representatives. Wu announced that he would resign from office following resolution of the 2011 debt ceiling crisis, days after reports surfaced that an 18-year-old woman had left a voicemail at Wu's campaign office accusing him of an unwanted sexual encounter. Wu acknowledged the encounter and said it was consensual.

Wu submitted his resignation on August 3, 2011. A special election was held on January 31, 2012, to fill the vacancy in advance of the regular 2012 election. Democrat Suzanne Bonamici defeated Republican challenger Rob Cornilles to win this special election.

Since his resignation, Wu has remained in the Washington, D.C. area. He has been raising money for local Democratic parties, and organizing student exchange programs between the Chinese and American space programs.

== Early life and education ==
Wu was born in Hsinchu, Taiwan. His parents were from Suzhou in Jiangsu province and settled in Taiwan due to the Chinese Civil War. The family moved to the United States in 1961. Wu spent his first two years in the U.S. in Latham, New York, where his family were the only Asian Americans in town.

Wu received a Bachelor of Science degree in biology from Stanford University in 1977 and attended Harvard Medical School for a time, sharing an apartment with future-United States Senator Bill Frist. Wu did not complete his medical studies. Instead, he attended Yale Law School where he was awarded a Juris Doctor degree in 1982.

== Law career ==
Wu served as a clerk for a federal judge. In 1984, he joined the Miller Nash law firm. In 1988, he co-founded the law firm of Cohen & Wu. The firm focused on representing clients in Oregon's high-tech development sector, centered on "Silicon Forest."

== U.S. Congressman ==
=== Elections ===
Wu was first elected to the U.S. House of Representatives in 1998, succeeding Democrat Elizabeth Furse. He narrowly defeated Republican Molly Bordonaro by a little over 7,100 votes. He won re-election in 2000, defeating state senator Charles Starr in the November election with 58% of the vote to 39% for Starr. Redistricting after the 2000 census made the 1st considerably more Democratic, notably by pushing the district further into Portland. The 1st had long included the portion of Portland in Washington County, but the new map pushed it into Multnomah County, taking in almost all of the city west of the Williamette River.

Wu won re-election in 2004 over Republican Goli Ameri; in 2006 over Oregon state representative Derrick Kitts and two minor party candidates; and in 2008 with no Republican candidate running, he captured 72% of the vote to win a sixth term over four minor party candidates. He faced his most difficult reelection test in 2010, defeating Republican challenger Rob Cornilles with 54% of the vote.

=== Tenure ===
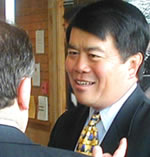
Wu in 2004

Wu was a member of the New Democrat Coalition (NDC), a group of moderate Democrats in the House. In 2009, he received a 100 percent rating from NARAL Pro-Choice America. He was also a member of the executive board for the Congressional Asian Pacific American Caucus and served as chair from January 2001 to January 2004.

Wu funded virus research at the Oregon Health and Science University that may be the first effective treatment and vaccine for AIDS. He authored legislation to promote research and product development by small businesses using a portion of federal research grants. Wu was a staunch supporter of science and research at both the basic and applied levels.

In the House, Wu was known for taking a strong stand on human rights and the rule of law, sometimes at the risk of his own seat. He opposed granting Most Favored Nation (MFN) trading status to China (renamed later as "Normal Trade Relations"), citing human rights violations and predicting that the trade deficit with China would balloon under the legislation. The two largest employers in his Congressional District, Nike and Intel, strongly supported granting MFN status to China. He favored closing the detention center at Guantanamo Bay, citing rule of law concerns.

Wu was a strong advocate for NASA and the space program. He served on the House Science Committee, which has jurisdiction over NASA, and on its Space Subcommittee, then chaired by Congresswoman Gabby Giffords. Wu defended NASA's budget and advocated for NASA goals for space exploration that are not subject to political influence. He viewed student interest in space as a way to promote STEM education, and founded a space camp scholarship program for underprivileged children. Wu continued this effort after he left Congress, and also started a program to send American students to China to learn about its space program. Chinese students were also included in order to promote international cooperation in space.

Perhaps Wu's most enduring legacy is his successful effort with his Washington State colleague Brian Baird to create the Lewis and Clark National Historic Park located at the mouth of the Columbia River. He expanded the Fort Clatsop National Memorial in 2002 and incorporated it into an expanded park in 2004.

=== Sexual assault allegation and resignation ===
On July 22, 2011, The Oregonian reported that an 18-year-old woman left a voicemail at Wu's campaign office accusing him of an unwanted sexual encounter. The woman is the daughter of a longtime friend and campaign donor. Wu acknowledged the encounter and said it was consensual. House Minority Leader Nancy Pelosi called for an ethics investigation into the allegations. Wu initially indicated that he would not resign but would also not seek reelection in 2012. Several days later, however, Wu announced he would resign following resolution of the 2011 US debt ceiling crisis. He resigned on August 3, 2011. This was his second brush with sexual assault allegations. On Oct 12, 2004, The Oregonian published a 3000 word article on a 1976 incident in a dormitory at Stanford University.

=== Committee assignments ===
- Committee on Education and Labor
  - Subcommittee on Higher Education and Workforce Training
  - Subcommittee on Health, Employment, Labor, and Pensions
- Committee on Science, Space and Technology
  - Subcommittee on Space and Aeronautics
  - Subcommittee on Technology and Innovation (Ranking Member)

== Post-Congress ==
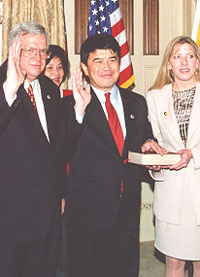
Wu and his wife Michelle as he is ceremonially sworn in by House Speaker Dennis Hastert, January 1999

In 2014 BuzzFeed reported that Wu was still living in the Washington area. The article noted that he frequently visited the Capitol and House offices to see friends, many of whom were still serving, such as Rep. Peter DeFazio. He also annually attended the Congressional Baseball Game, sometimes sat in on hearings and occasionally ventured onto the House floor, a privilege he is allowed as a former member.

Under the terms of his divorce, Wu explained to BuzzFeed, he must live in the Washington area until his daughter and son have finished high school. His income primarily comes from consulting for Chinese companies seeking to do business in the U.S.; he is also sometimes quoted in the Chinese media about issues such as the Senkaku Islands dispute (he supports China's claim to sovereignty over the islands, currently administered by Japan).

Wu is also treasurer of the Education and Opportunity Fund, a political action committee that supports county-level Democratic committees. At the time of BuzzFeed's article, he was trying to organize a student exchange program to allow Chinese and American students to tour the other country's space-program facilities, an exception to the prohibition on cooperation that otherwise exists. He said he eventually intended to return to Oregon.

== Personal life ==
Wu married Michelle Reinmiller in 1996, and they have two children. In December 2009, he filed for separation from his wife, citing irreconcilable differences, and is now divorced. Previously living in Portland, Oregon, Wu lives in the Washington D.C. area.

== Electoral history ==
2004 US House of Representatives, Oregon's 1st congressional district
Party	Candidate	Votes	%
Democratic	David Wu	203,771	57.5
Republican	Goli Ameri	135,164	38.1
Constitution	Dean Wolf	13,882	3.9
Write-in		1,521	0.4
Total votes		354,338	100%

2006 US House of Representatives, Oregon's 1st congressional district
Party	Candidate	Votes	%
Democratic	David Wu	169,409	62.8
Republican	Derrick Kitts	90,904	33.7
Libertarian	Drake Davis	4,497	1.7
Constitution	Dean Wolf	4,370	1.6
Write-in		447	0.2
Total votes		269,627	100%

2008 US House of Representatives, Oregon's 1st congressional district
Party	Candidate	Votes	%
Democratic	David Wu	237,567	71.5
Independent	Joel Haugen	58,279	17.5
Constitution	Scott Semrau	14,172	4.3
Libertarian	H Joe Tabor	10,992	3.3
Pacific Green	Chris Henry	7,128	2.1
Write-in		4,110	1.2
Total votes		332,248	100%

2010 US House of Representatives, Oregon's 1st congressional district
Party	Candidate	Votes	%
Democratic	David Wu	160,357	54.7
Republican	Rob Cornilles	122,858	41.9
Constitution	Don LaMunyon	3,855	1.3
Pacific Green	Chris Henry	2,955	1.0
Libertarian	H Joe Tabor	2,492	0.9
Write-in		392	0.1
Total votes		292,909	100%

== See also ==
- List of Asian Americans and Pacific Islands Americans in the United States Congress
- List of federal political scandals in the United States
- List of federal political sex scandals in the United States

U.S. House of Representatives
Preceded by Elizabeth Furse	Member of the U.S. House of Representatives from Oregon's 1st congressional district 1999–2011	Succeeded by Suzanne Bonamici
Preceded by Robert Underwood	Chair of the Congressional Asian Pacific American Caucus; 2001–2004	Succeeded by Mike Honda
U.S. order of precedence (ceremonial)
Preceded by Darlene Hooley as Former U.S. Representative	Order of precedence of the United States as Former U.S. Representative	Succeeded by Bob Whittaker as Former U.S. Representative
