= Hool =

Hool is a surname derived from Hoole. Notable people with the surname include:

- Constanza Hool, (1925–2008), Mexican dancer
- Lance Hool, Mexican film director
- Sonny Hool (1924–1988), Irish cricketer
