= Holeys =

Canadian footwear manufacturing company

- Formerly: Holey Soles
- Company type: Private company
- Industry: Footwear
- Founded: 2002 in Vancouver
- Founder: Anne Rosenberg
- Headquarters: Delta, British Columbia, Canada
- Key people: Joyce Groote (CEO and owner)
- Products: Perforated, injection-moulded shoes
- Owner: Joyce Groote and her husband Rick Walter
- Website: www.holeys.com at the Wayback Machine (archived March 16, 2015)

Holeys (formerly Holey Soles) was a Canadian company that manufactured and distributes injection foam molded footwear and other lifestyle products made from ethylene-vinyl acetate, closed cell polymer.

In 2016, Holeys was named the #1 Fastest Growing Company in Canada by the Profit Hot 50 list, with a two-year growth of 6,500%. Joyce Groote, CEO & President, was a finalist in the 2007 Ernst & Young Entrepreneur of the Year Award.

In 2015, the company announced on its web site that it would no longer sell direct to consumers and would only be selling via retail stores and on-line outlets.

== Company history ==
Holeys began as a small company operating out of a residential garage in Vancouver in 2002. The company was started by Groote's neighbour, Anne Rosenberg, a serial entrepreneur who successfully introduced the original foam shoes into Vancouver, British Columbia, Canada. In early 2004, Joyce Groote was approached to help grow the company to the next stage. Groote, a former geneticist, had moved to Vancouver to work with small start up companies in the life science sector. She saw a strong potential for growth in Holeys and became an angel investor and a partner.

In late 2004, she purchased the company. At this time, Holeys had annual revenues of just under $60,000. The company grew exponentially to become a multimillion-dollar company that sold their shoes in more than 40 countries worldwide.

In 2015, the company announced that it would stop selling direct to customers on its website.

== Charitable donations ==
Holeys became known for its donations to charitable organizations around the world. In 2007, Holeys partnered with Soles4Souls to provide 100,000 pairs of shoes worldwide to people in need. This was the largest single donation at that time for Soles4Souls.

Holeys has also donated funds to aid the victims of the Dec. 24, 2004 tsunami in Thailand, and donated 260,000 worth of shoes to those affected by Hurricane Katrina in the United States of America. In addition to their international humanitarian efforts, Holeys contributes to North American children's charities including First Steps Canada.
