= Hoole (surname) =

Hoole is an English toponymic surname from Hoole, a suburb in Chester, Cheshire, England. Notable people with the surname include:

- Daan Hoole (born 1999), Dutch cyclist
- Daryl Hoole (born 1934), American author and public speaker
- Elijah Hoole (1798–1872), English Wesleyan Methodist missionary, father of the architect of the same name
- Elijah Hoole (architect) (1837–1912), English architect, son of the missionary of the same name
- John Hoole (1727–1803), English translator
- Ken Hoole (1916–1988), English railway historian
- Rajan Hoole, Tamil human rights activist
- Ratnajeevan Hoole (born 1952), Sri Lankan Tamil electrical engineering academic
- William Stanley Hoole (1903–1990) American librarian, historian

== See also ==
- Hool
- Hoole (disambiguation)
- Hooley (surname)
