= Hoole (disambiguation) =

Hoole is a suburb in Cheshire, UK. It may also refer to:

== Places ==
- Hoole Village, civil parish in Cheshire, UK
- Much Hoole, in South Ribble, Lancashire, UK
- Little Hoole, civil parish in Lancashire, UK
  - Hoole railway station, defunct railway station in Little Hoole

== People ==
see Hoole (surname)

== Other ==
- Hoole!, the sound sometimes made by pigs prior to toppling down in the game, Angry Birds
