= Mike Erickson =

American businessman and political candidate

Personal details
- Born: Michael Kurtis Erickson; January 27, 1963 (age 63) Seattle, Washington, U.S.
- Party: Republican
- Education: Portland State University (BA)

Michael Kurtis Erickson (born January 27, 1963) is an American businessman and political candidate in the U.S. state of Oregon. Erickson has been the Republican nominee for the United States House of Representatives four times, losing each time: in Oregon's 6th congressional district in 2022 and 2024, and in Oregon's 5th congressional district in 2006 and 2008.

== Life and career ==
The son of a police officer, Erickson attended Portland State University where he was a placekicker and punter on Portland State's football team from 1985 to 1988, and ranks second on the school's list for field goals made with 32. Erickson earned a business degree from Portland State in 1987.

After college, he started AFMS Logistics Management Group, which helps companies negotiate competitive shipping contracts. The company made Inc. magazine's list of the 500 fastest-growing companies in the United States twice: in 2004, it was number 319 and in 2005, it was number 350.

== Early political career ==
In 1988, Erickson was the Republican candidate for the Oregon House of Representatives seat representing Tigard, but lost to Democrat Tom Brian. In 1992, Erickson again ran for a different Oregon House seat in Southeast Portland, losing to Kate Brown.

In 2006, Erickson was the Republican nominee for the United States House of Representatives seat in Oregon's 5th congressional district against incumbent Democrat Darlene Hooley, who defeated Erickson.

== 2008 congressional campaign ==
In 2008, Hooley announced her retirement from the House. Once again, Erickson ran for the Republican nomination, as did Republican opponent former gubernatorial candidate Kevin Mannix. In the closing weeks of the Republican primary, Mannix mailed 60,000 of his supporters copies of an email that alleged that in 2000, Erickson drove his pregnant girlfriend to a Portland abortion clinic and paid for her to have an abortion. The author of the email, a friend of the pregnant woman, originally sent the email in 2006 during Erickson's first congressional campaign, but had declined to give on-the-record interviews at that time. In May 2008, both women were interviewed by the Portland Tribune about the incident. Erickson denied the charges, stating that he drove a former girlfriend named Tawnya to a doctor's appointment and gave her $300, but did not know she was pregnant or had an abortion. In June, The Oregonian published a story based on claims from the woman herself, in which she described the event in more detail and provided photos, medical procedure and billing records.

Erickson narrowly won the Republican nomination, but Mannix refused to endorse him in the general election, as did Oregon Right to Life. The two Oregon Republican members of Congress, Senator Gordon Smith and Congressman Greg Walden, also declined to endorse Erickson. Erickson lost in the general election to Democrat Kurt Schrader.

== 2022 congressional campaign ==
On March 8, 2022, Erickson filed to run for Oregon's newly created 6th congressional district. He won the Republican primary election and faced Democratic nominee Andrea Salinas in the November 2022 general election. Erickson lost the November general election.

Erickson has filed a defamation against Andrea Salinas over her use of a political ad talking about his arrest in 2016. While the case was brought under a state law which could overturn the election result, Erickson's attorney stated in a December 2022 hearing that he wasn't currently seeking to prevent Salinas from taking office. The case is ongoing as of February 2024.

== 2024 congressional campaign ==
On January 31, 2024, Erickson announced a second run for the 6th district. He defeated three other candidates in the May 21, 2024, Republican primary and faced incumbent Andrea Salinas in the general election. Salinas defeated Erickson in the November general election.

== Electoral history ==
2006 US House of Representatives, Oregon's 5th congressional district
Party	Candidate	Votes	%
Democratic	Darlene Hooley	146,973	54.0
Republican	Mike Erickson	116,424	42.8
Progressive	Paul Aranas	4,194	1.5
Constitution	Douglas Patterson	4,160	1.5
Write-in		483	0.2
Total votes		272,234	100%

2008 US House of Representatives, Oregon's 5th congressional district
Party	Candidate	Votes	%
Democratic	Kurt Schrader	181,577	54.3
Republican	Mike Erickson	128,297	38.3
Independent	Sean Bates	6,830	2.0
Constitution	Douglas Patterson	6,558	2.0
Pacific Green	Alex Polikoff	5,272	1.6
Libertarian	Steve Milligan	4,814	1.4
Write-in		1,326	0.4
Total votes		334,674	100%

2022 US House of Representatives, Oregon's 6th congressional district
Party	Candidate	Votes	%
Democratic	Andrea Salinas	147,156	50.0
Republican	Mike Erickson	139,946	47.5
Constitution	Larry D McFarland	6,762	2.3
Write-in		513	0.2
Total votes		294,377	100%

2024 US House of Representatives, Oregon's 6th congressional district
Party	Candidate	Votes	%
Democratic	Andrea Salinas	180,869	53.3
Republican	Mike Erickson	157,634	46.5
Write-in		562	0.2
Total votes		339,065	100%
