= Holey =

Holey may refer to:

== People with the surname ==
- Jan Udo Holey (born 1967), pen name Jan van Helsing, is a controversial German author who embraces conspiracy theories
- Illingworth Holey Kerr (1905–1989), Canadian painter, illustrator and writer
- Макс Барских

== Other uses ==
- Holey Artisan Bakery, bakery located in Dhaka, Bangladesh
- Holey dollar, coins used in the early history of two British settlements: Prince Edward Island and New South Wales
- Holey Plains State Park, 10,638-hectare state park in East Gippsland, Victoria, south-eastern Australia

== See also ==
- Holey Artisan Bakery attack
- Holey building, monument and building in the business district of La Défense and in the commune of Puteaux, to the west of Paris, France
- Holey fiber, a type of Photonic-crystal fiber (PCF), a new class of optical fiber based on the properties of photonic crystals
- Holeys
- Holley (disambiguation)
- Holy
- Hooley
