= Derrick Kitts =

American politician

Member of the Oregon House of Representatives from the 30th district
- In office 2003–2007
- Preceded by: Jim Hill
- Succeeded by: David Edwards

Personal details
- Born: c. 1973 (age 52–53)
- Party: Republican
- Education: Portland State University

Derrick Kitts (born c. 1973) is a Republican politician from Hillsboro in the U.S. state of Oregon. A native of Washington, he served two terms in the Oregon House of Representatives before giving up his seat in an unsuccessful bid for Congress in 2006.

== Early life ==
Kitts grew up in Puyallup, Washington, near Tacoma where he wrestled and played water polo in high school. He then attended Portland State University where he wrestled for the school. During the summer breaks he worked at the Port of Tacoma as a longshoreman . Kitts studied political science at Portland State and graduated in 1997 with a bachelor's degree. In 2001, he returned to Oregon and settled in Hillsboro where he planned to run for political office.

== Political career ==
In November 2001, Kitts announced he would run for Oregon House District 30, which covered primarily Hillsboro. Prior experience in politics included serving as Joe Scarborough’s political director and as field director for U.S. Representative Rick White’s 1998 re-election campaign. At the time he owned his own one-person landscaping business in Hillsboro, Kitts Executive Landscaping, and was a wrestling coach at Glencoe High School in Hillsboro. Kitts faced Dawn Phillips in the May 2002 Republican primary with the chance to run against Aron Carleson in the November general election, as Democrat Carleson was running unopposed in her primary. The incumbent, Bruce Starr, ran for a seat in the Oregon State Senate.

Kitts won the primary against Phillips and faced Carleson in the November 2002 general election where Republicans held a seven percent lead in voter registrations in the district. A complaint was filed against Kitts in October claiming he violated election laws. The complaint, filed by the chairman of the Washington County Democratic Central Committee, was also used as fodder in a mailer by the Democrat’s Future PAC, but was dismissed by the state as no violations were found. Kitts then defeated Carleson in the general election with 8,540 votes to 8,363.

During the 2003 legislature he introduced legislation that would require the state Capitol to install a High Tech Hall of Fame and legislation that would prohibit state employees from making more in salary than the governor. He served as vice-chairman of the House Business and Labor Committee during the session. It was also rumored during the session that he might also run for Congress to challenge Representative David Wu. Also during the session he was arrested in Longview, Washington, for driving under the influence in February, and was ordered into a diversion program. He pleaded guilty to reckless driving and completed the diversion program.

Kitts ran for re-election in 2004, and faced Democrat Miklosch Sander in the general election in November. By that time Kitts had abandoned his landscaping business and was working as a campaign consultant, including the re-election campaign of Tom Hughes. After winning re-election, Democrats again filed an ethics complaint with the state in February 2005, and again the complaint was rejected by the Oregon Government Standards and Practices Commission. During the 2005 legislature Kitts was elected as majority whip in the House, and after the session ended worked on Kevin Mannix’s gubernatorial campaign. Following the session in January 2006 he announced he would not run for re-election and would instead run for Congress in the First District, facing incumbent David Wu, a Democrat. The First District’s registered voters were 38 percent Democrats, 35 percent Republicans, and 24 percent unaffiliated.

Kitts lost to Wu in the election, but during the campaign, news broke about a trip to Hawaii which Kitts and other state legislators took in 2004. The trip was paid for by the Oregon Beer and Wine Distributors Association, and the seven legislators failed to report the trip as the industry’s lobbyist erroneously told them they did not need to report the trip. This triggered an inquiry by the ethics commission into a total of five trips paid for by the distributors in 2002 and 2004 between the seven legislators, with Kitts accused of not reporting a single trip. Kitts eventually settled with the ethics commission for a fine of $450 for failing to report the trip and $290 for failing to report a free round of golf while on the same trip. He was replaced in the Oregon House by Democrat David Edwards. By October 2007 Kitts was working for Pacific Lifestyle Homes and announced he was considering a run for mayor of Hillsboro in 2008. However, Jerry Willey ran unopposed in the November election to replace Tom Hughes.

== Later life ==
After leaving politics, he attended law school at the Thomas Jefferson School of Law in San Diego, California. He was then admitted to practice law in Oregon in 2020 and opened a law firm in Oregon.

== Electoral history ==
2004 Oregon State Representative, 30th district
Party	Candidate	Votes	%
Republican	Derrick Kitts	14,546	54.5
Democratic	Miklosch (Mik) Sander	11,244	42.1
Constitution	Scott Semrau	800	3.0
Write-in		106	0.4
Total votes		26,696	100%

2006 US House of Representatives, Oregon's 1st congressional district
Party	Candidate	Votes	%
Democratic	David Wu	169,409	62.8
Republican	Derrick Kitts	90,904	33.7
Libertarian	Drake Davis	4,497	1.7
Constitution	Dean Wolf	4,370	1.6
Write-in		447	0.2
Total votes		269,627	100%

Party political offices
Preceded by Goli Ameri	Republican Party Nominee Oregon's 1st Congressional District; 2006	Succeeded by None
