= 2008 United States House of Representatives elections in Oregon =

- November 4, 2008

All 5 Oregon seats to the United States House of Representatives
| | Majority party | Minority party |
|---|---|---|
| Party | Democratic | Republican |
| Last election | 4 | 1 |
| Seats won | 4 | 1 |
| Seat change | Steady | Steady |
| Popular vote | 1,036,171 | 435,920 |
| Percentage | 61.58% | 25.91% |
| Swing | ▲5.16% | ▼15.16% |

Democratic
40–50%
50–60%
60–70%
70–80%
80–90%
Republican
40–50%
60–70%
70–80%
80–90%

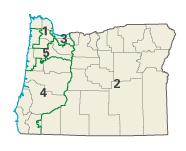
Oregon's United States congressional districts

The 2008 United States House of Representatives elections in Oregon were held on November 4, 2008, to determine who will represent the state of Oregon in the United States House of Representatives, coinciding with the presidential and senatorial elections. Representatives are elected for two-year terms those elected will be serving in the 111th Congress from January 3, 2009, until January 3, 2011.

Oregon has five seats in the House, apportioned according to the 2000 United States census. Its 2007–2008 congressional delegation consisted of four Democrats and one Republican. This remains unchanged although CQ Politics had forecasted district 5 to be at some risk for the incumbent party earlier in the year.

A primary election for Democrats and Republicans was held on May 20. To be eligible for the primaries, candidates had to file for election by March 11. Other parties had other procedures for nominating candidates.

== Overview ==
United States House of Representatives elections in Oregon, 2008
| Party | Votes | Percentage | Seats | +/– |
|---|---|---|---|---|
| Democratic | 1,036,171 | 61.58% | 4 | — |
| Republican | 435,920 | 25.91% | 1 | — |
| Constitution | 69,680 | 4.14% | | — |
| Independent | 65,109 | 3.87% | | — |
| Pacific Green | 50,293 | 2.99% | | — |
| Libertarian | 15,806 | 0.94% | | — |
| write-ins | 9,530 | 0.57% | | — |
| Totals | 1,682,509 | 100 | 5 | — |

== District 1 ==
2008 Oregon's 1st congressional district election
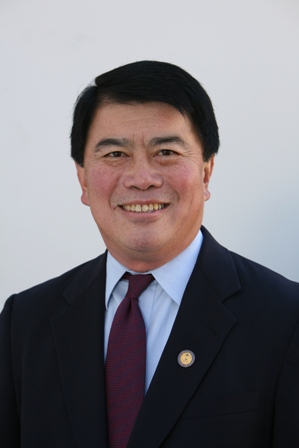

| Nominee | David Wu | Joel Haugen |
| Party | Democratic | Independent Party |
| Popular vote | 237,567 | 58,279 |
| Percentage | 71.5% | 17.5% |
- County results Wu: 60–70% 70–80% 80–90%
U.S. Representative before election
David Wu
Democratic
Elected U.S. Representative
David Wu
Democratic

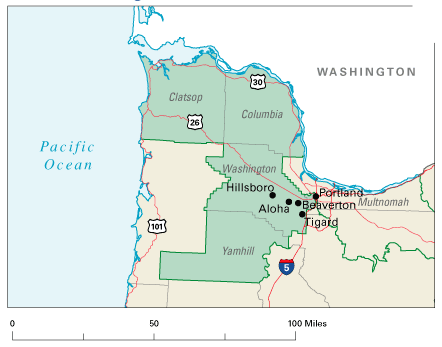

Democratic incumbent David Wu has represented Oregon's 1st congressional district since 1998 and is the Democratic nominee in 2008, defeating Will Hobbs and Mark Welyczko in the primary. Hobbs, a political novice, earned some attention late in the race, by winning the endorsements of major newspapers The Oregonian and Willamette Week. He won 16.7% of the vote to Wu's 78.0%.

In the Republican primary, Joel Haugen defeated pathologist Claude W. Chappell IV, but later withdrew his acceptance of the Republican nomination after his endorsement of Democrat Barack Obama for president drew objections from Republican party leaders.

=== Democratic primary ===
==== Results ====
Democratic Primary results
| Party | Candidate | Votes | % |
|---|---|---|---|
| Democratic | David Wu (incumbent) | 91,466 | 77.92 |
| Democratic | Will Hobbs | 19,659 | 16.75 |
| Democratic | Mark Welyczko | 5,982 | 5.10 |
| | write-ins | 285 | 0.24 |
| Total votes | | 117,392 | 100 |

=== Republican primary ===
==== Results ====
Republican Primary results
| Party | Candidate | Votes | % |
|---|---|---|---|
| Republican | Joel Haugen | 29,658 | 68.95 |
| Republican | Claude William Chappell IV | 12,524 | 29.12 |
| | write-ins | 829 | 1.93 |
| Total votes | | 43,011 | 100 |

=== General election ===
==== Predictions ====
| Source | Ranking | As of |
|---|---|---|
| The Cook Political Report | Safe D | November 6, 2008 |
| Rothenberg | Safe D | November 2, 2008 |
| Sabato's Crystal Ball | Safe D | November 6, 2008 |
| Real Clear Politics | Safe D | November 7, 2008 |
| CQ Politics | Safe D | November 6, 2008 |

==== Results ====
Oregon's 1st congressional district election, 2008
| Party | Candidate | Votes | % |
|---|---|---|---|
| Democratic | David Wu (incumbent) | 237,567 | 71.50 |
| Independent Party | Joel Haugen | 58,279 | 17.54 |
| Constitution | Scott Semrau | 14,172 | 4.27 |
| Libertarian | H. Joe Tabor | 10,992 | 3.31 |
| Pacific Green | Chris Henry | 7,128 | 2.15 |
| | write-ins | 4,110 | 1.24 |
| Total votes | | 332,248 | 100 |
| Democratic hold | | | |

== District 2 ==
2008 Oregon's 2nd congressional district election
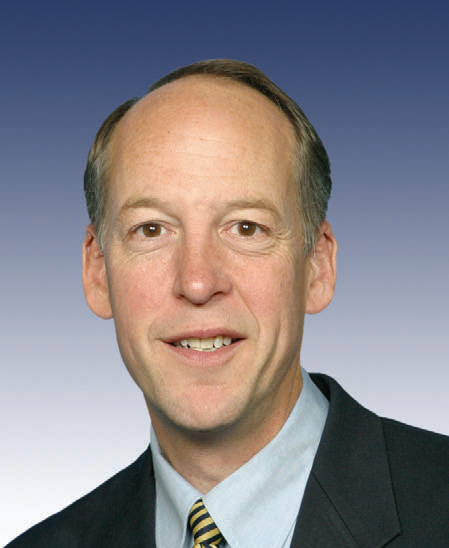

| Nominee | Greg Walden | Noah Lemas |
| Party | Republican | Democratic |
| Popular vote | 236,560 | 87,649 |
| Percentage | 69.5% | 25.8% |
- County results Walden: 60–70% 70–80% 80–90%
U.S. Representative before election
Greg Walden
Republican
Elected U.S. Representative
Greg Walden
Republican

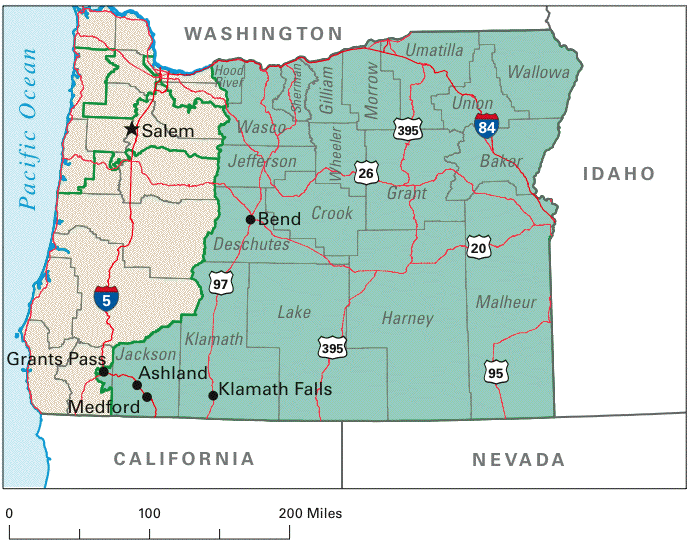

Incumbent Republican Greg Walden has represented Oregon's 2nd congressional district since 1998 and was unopposed for the Republican nomination in 2008. In the general election, he faced Democrat Noah Lemas, a small business owner, Richard Hake of the Constitution Party of Oregon and Pacific Green Party candidate Tristin Mock.

=== Democratic primary ===
==== Results ====
Democratic Primary results
| Party | Candidate | Votes | % |
|---|---|---|---|
| Democratic | Noah Lemas | 56,980 | 97.86 |
| | write-ins | 1,247 | 2.14 |
| Total votes | | 58,227 | 100 |

=== Republican primary ===
==== Results ====
Republican Primary results
| Party | Candidate | Votes | % |
|---|---|---|---|
| Republican | Greg Walden (incumbent) | 83,087 | 99.14 |
| | write-ins | 721 | 0.86 |
| Total votes | | 83,808 | 100 |

=== General election ===
==== Predictions ====
| Source | Ranking | As of |
|---|---|---|
| The Cook Political Report | Safe R | November 6, 2008 |
| Rothenberg | Safe R | November 2, 2008 |
| Sabato's Crystal Ball | Safe R | November 6, 2008 |
| Real Clear Politics | Safe R | November 7, 2008 |
| CQ Politics | Safe R | November 6, 2008 |

==== Results ====
Oregon's 2nd congressional district election, 2008
| Party | Candidate | Votes | % |
|---|---|---|---|
| Republican | Greg Walden (incumbent) | 236,560 | 69.50 |
| Democratic | Noah Lemas | 87,649 | 25.75 |
| Pacific Green | Tristin Mock | 9,668 | 2.84 |
| Constitution | Richard D. Hake | 5,817 | 1.71 |
| | write-ins | 685 | 0.20 |
| Total votes | | 340,379 | 100 |
| Republican hold | | | |

== District 3 ==
2008 Oregon's 3rd congressional district election
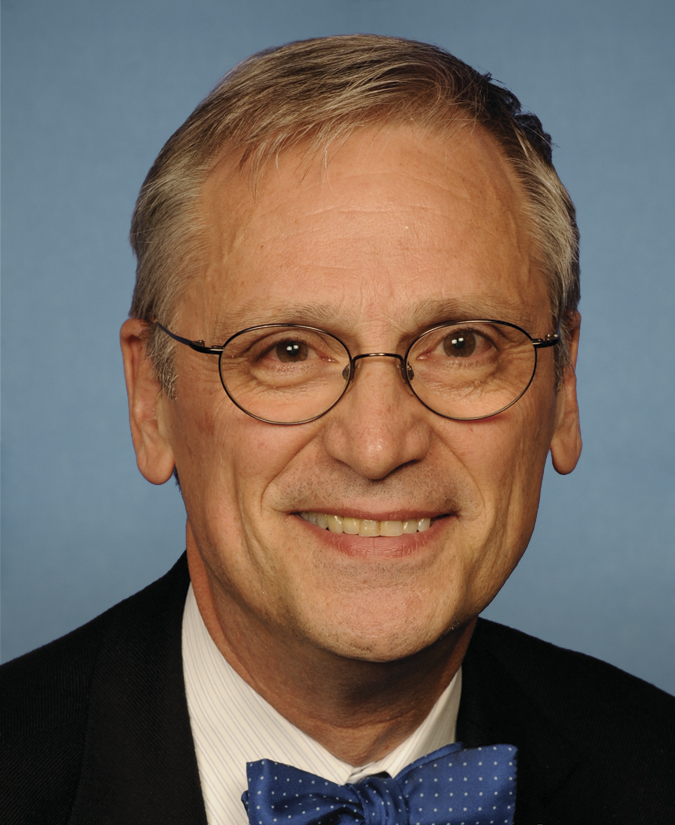

| Nominee | Earl Blumenauer | Delia Lopez |
| Party | Democratic | Republican |
| Popular vote | 254,235 | 71,063 |
| Percentage | 74.5% | 20.8% |
- County results Blumenauer: 60–70% 70–80%
U.S. Representative before election
Earl Blumenauer
Democratic
Elected U.S. Representative
Earl Blumenauer
Democratic

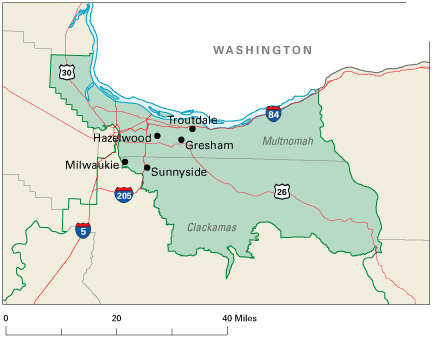

Incumbent Democrat Earl Blumenauer has represented Oregon's 3rd congressional district since 1996 and was the Democratic nominee in 2008, defeating TV co-host John Sweeney and retired utility worker and peace activist Joseph "Lone Vet" Walsh in the primary. In the general election, he faced Republican Delia Lopez, a real estate investor, and Pacific Green Party candidate Michael Meo.

=== Democratic primary ===
==== Results ====
Democratic Primary results
| Party | Candidate | Votes | % |
|---|---|---|---|
| Democratic | Earl Blumenauer (incumbent) | 121,176 | 86.79 |
| Democratic | John Sweeney | 9,389 | 6.72 |
| Democratic | Joseph Walsh | 8,783 | 6.29 |
| | write-ins | 343 | 0.25 |
| Total votes | | 139,691 | 100 |

=== Republican primary ===
==== Results ====
Republican Primary results
| Party | Candidate | Votes | % |
|---|---|---|---|
| Republican | Delia Lopez | 22,114 | 96.88 |
| | write-ins | 712 | 3.12 |
| Total votes | | 22,826 | 100 |

=== General election ===
==== Predictions ====
| Source | Ranking | As of |
|---|---|---|
| The Cook Political Report | Safe D | November 6, 2008 |
| Rothenberg | Safe D | November 2, 2008 |
| Sabato's Crystal Ball | Safe D | November 6, 2008 |
| Real Clear Politics | Safe D | November 7, 2008 |
| CQ Politics | Safe D | November 6, 2008 |

==== Results ====
Oregon's 3rd congressional district election, 2008
| Party | Candidate | Votes | % |
|---|---|---|---|
| Democratic | Earl Blumenauer (incumbent) | 254,235 | 74.54 |
| Republican | Delia Lopez | 71,063 | 20.84 |
| Pacific Green | Michael Meo | 15,063 | 4.42 |
| | write-ins | 701 | 0.21 |
| Total votes | | 341,062 | 100 |
| Democratic hold | | | |

== District 4 ==
2008 Oregon's 4th congressional district election
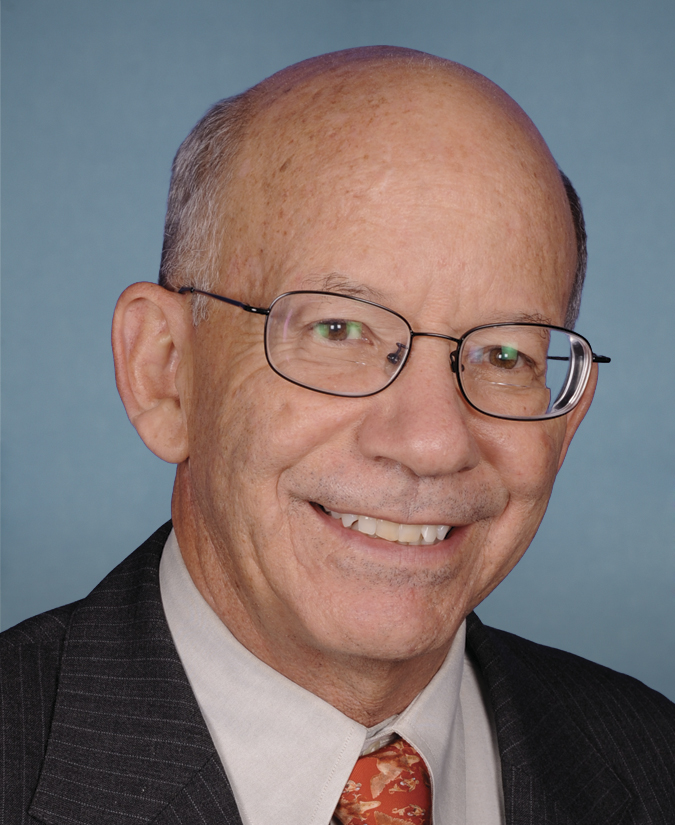

| Nominee | Peter DeFazio | Jaynee Germond |
| Party | Democratic | Constitution |
| Popular vote | 275,143 | 43,133 |
| Percentage | 82.3% | 12.9% |
- County results Defazio: 60–70% 70–80% 80–90%
U.S. Representative before election
Peter DeFazio
Democratic
Elected U.S. Representative
Peter DeFazio
Democratic

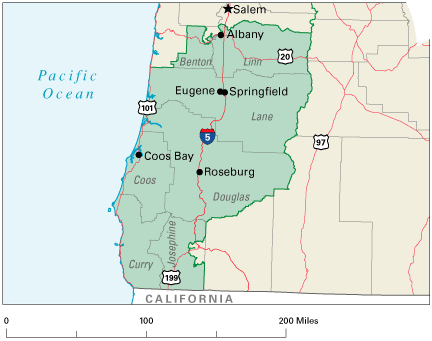

Incumbent Democrat Peter DeFazio has represented Oregon's 4th congressional district since 1986 and was unopposed for the Democratic nomination in 2008. He was being challenged in the general election by Constitution Party member Jaynee Germond and Pacific Green Mike Beilstein, a research chemist. CQ Politics forecasted the race as 'Safe Democrat'.

=== Democratic primary ===
==== Results ====
Democratic Primary results
| Party | Candidate | Votes | % |
|---|---|---|---|
| Democratic | Peter A. DeFazio (incumbent) | 119,366 | 99.21 |
| | write-ins | 955 | 0.79 |
| Total votes | | 120,321 | 100 |

=== Republican primary ===
==== Results ====
Republican Primary results
| Party | Candidate | Votes | % |
|---|---|---|---|
| Democratic | Peter A. DeFazio (write-in) | 906 | 27.87 |
| | write-ins | 2,345 | 72.13 |
| Total votes | | 3,251 | 100 |

=== General election ===
==== Predictions ====
| Source | Ranking | As of |
|---|---|---|
| The Cook Political Report | Safe D | November 6, 2008 |
| Rothenberg | Safe D | November 2, 2008 |
| Sabato's Crystal Ball | Safe D | November 6, 2008 |
| Real Clear Politics | Safe D | November 7, 2008 |
| CQ Politics | Safe D | November 6, 2008 |

==== Results ====
Oregon's 4th congressional district election, 2008
| Party | Candidate | Votes | % |
|---|---|---|---|
| Democratic | Peter DeFazio (incumbent) | 275,143 | 82.34 |
| Constitution | Jaynee Germond | 43,133 | 12.91 |
| Pacific Green | Mike Beilstein | 13,162 | 3.94 |
| | write-ins | 2,708 | 0.81 |
| Total votes | | 334,146 | 100 |
| Democratic hold | | | |

== District 5 ==
2008 Oregon's 5th congressional district election
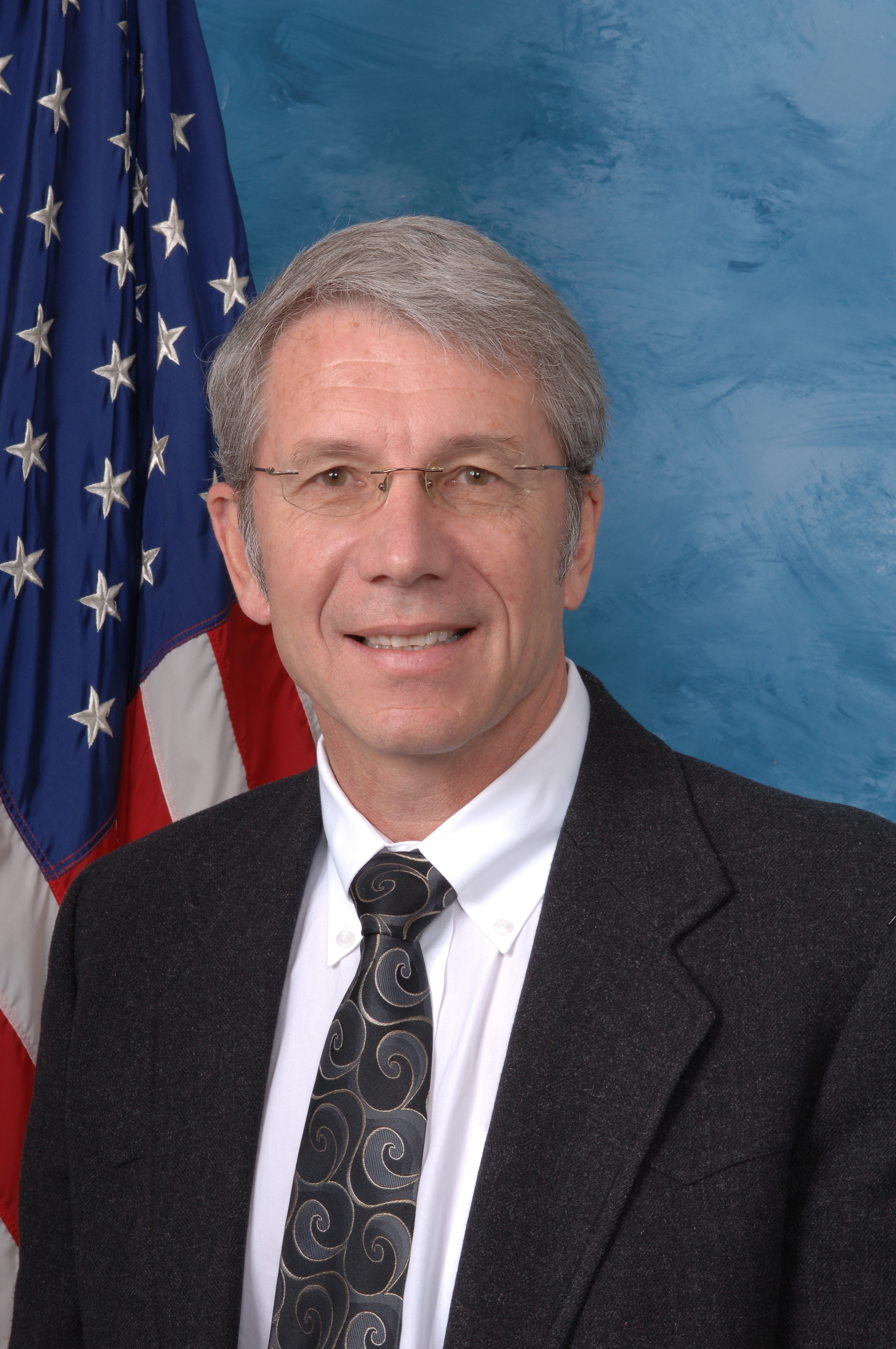

| Nominee | Kurt Schrader | Mike Erickson |
| Party | Democratic | Republican |
| Popular vote | 181,577 | 128,297 |
| Percentage | 54.3% | 38.3% |
- County results Schrader: 40–50% 50–60% 70–80%
U.S. Representative before election
Darlene Hooley
Democratic
Elected U.S. Representative
Kurt Schrader
Democratic

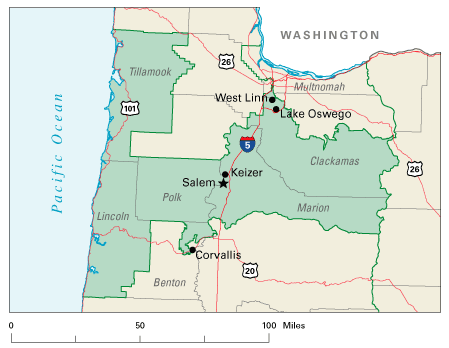

In February 2008, Democrat Darlene Hooley, who had represented Oregon's 5th congressional district since 1996, announced that she would not seek re-election in 2008. The race to replace her was expected to be one of the most competitive in the nation, since the district contained about 2,000 more Republicans than Democrats at that time.

There were two major factors for the competitiveness of the race: first, the demographics of the district had changed dramatically. In June, there were 20,000 more registered Democrats than Republicans in the district, a net swing of 22,000 voters since February. Secondly, Republican nominee Erickson won a contentious primary in which an opponent, Kevin Mannix, raised an allegation that Erickson paid for a former girlfriend's abortion. The girlfriend subsequently went public with the information, but Erickson denied knowledge of the event. Mannix refused to endorse Erickson in the general election.

Democratic nominee Kurt Schrader won against Republican nominee Mike Erickson, 166,070 (54.3%) to 116,418 (38.3%). Also competing were Libertarian nominee Steve Milligan, Constitution nominee Douglas Patterson, Pacific Green nominee Alex Polikoff, and Independent Sean Bates.

=== Democratic primary ===
==== Results ====
Democratic Primary results
| Party | Candidate | Votes | % |
|---|---|---|---|
| Democratic | Kurt Schrader | 51,980 | 53.84 |
| Democratic | Nancy Moran | 18,597 | 19.26 |
| Democratic | Steve Marks | 17,643 | 18.27 |
| Democratic | Andrew Foster | 6,104 | 6.32 |
| Democratic | Richard Nathe | 1,748 | 1.81 |
| | write-ins | 482 | 0.50 |
| Total votes | | 96,554 | 100 |

=== Republican primary ===
==== Results ====
Republican Primary results
| Party | Candidate | Votes | % |
|---|---|---|---|
| Republican | Mike Erickson | 37,217 | 47.94 |
| Republican | Kevin Mannix | 36,005 | 46.38 |
| Republican | Richard "RJ" Wilson | 4,110 | 5.29 |
| | write-ins | 302 | 0.39 |
| Total votes | | 77,634 | 100 |

=== General election ===
==== Predictions ====
| Source | Ranking | As of |
|---|---|---|
| The Cook Political Report | Likely D | November 6, 2008 |
| Rothenberg | Safe D | November 2, 2008 |
| Sabato's Crystal Ball | Lean D | November 6, 2008 |
| Real Clear Politics | Safe D | November 7, 2008 |
| CQ Politics | Likely D | November 6, 2008 |

==== Results ====
Oregon's 5th congressional district election, 2008
| Party | Candidate | Votes | % |
|---|---|---|---|
| Democratic | Kurt Schrader | 181,577 | 54.25 |
| Republican | Mike Erickson | 128,297 | 38.33 |
| Independent Party | Sean Bates | 6,830 | 2.04 |
| Constitution | Douglas Patterson | 6,558 | 1.96 |
| Pacific Green | Alex Polikoff | 5,272 | 1.58 |
| Libertarian | Steve Milligan | 4,814 | 1.44 |
| | write-ins | 1,326 | 0.40 |
| Total votes | | 334,674 | 100 |
| Democratic hold | | | |

== See also ==
- United States House of Representatives elections, 2008
- United States presidential election in Oregon, 2008
- United States Senate election in Oregon, 2008
- Oregon state elections, 2008
