= 2006 United States House of Representatives elections in Oregon =

- November 7, 2006

All 5 Oregon seats to the United States House of Representatives
	Majority party	Minority party
Party	Democratic	Republican
Last election	4	1
Seats won	4	1
Seat change	Steady	Steady
Popular vote	765,853	557,491
Percentage	56.42%	41.07%
Swing	▲2.72%	▼1.90%

Democratic
50–60%
60–70%
70–80%
Republican
50–60%
60–70%
70–80%
80–90%

The 2006 United States House of Representatives elections in Oregon were held on November 7, 2006, to select Oregon's representatives to the United States House of Representatives. All five seats were up for election in 2006, as they are every two years. All five incumbents were re-elected, four of them by large margins; only the 5th district was somewhat competitive.

== Overview ==
United States House of Representatives elections in Oregon, 2006
Party	Votes	Percentage	Seats	+/–
Democratic	765,853	56.42%	4	—
Republican	557,491	41.07%	1	—
Constitution (Oregon)	22,726	1.67%		—
Libertarian	4,497	0.33%		—
Pacific Green	4,194	0.31%		—
write-ins	2,673	0.20%	0	—
Totals	1,357,434	100.00%	5	—

== District 1 ==
2006 Oregon's 1st congressional district election
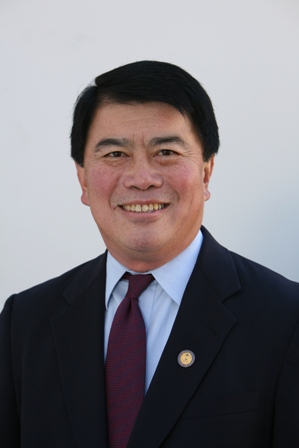

Nominee	David Wu	Derrick Kitts
Party	Democratic	Republican
Popular vote	169,409	90,904
Percentage	62.8%	33.7%
- County results Wu: 50–60% 60–70% 80–90%
U.S. Representative before election
David Wu
Democratic
Elected U.S. Representative
David Wu
Democratic

=== Democratic primary ===
==== Results ====
Democratic Primary results
Party	Candidate	Votes	%
Democratic	David Wu (incumbent)	55,188	87.06
Democratic	Alexa J. Lewis	4,795	7.56
Democratic	Shantu Shah	1,595	2.52
Democratic	Pavel Goberman	1,582	2.50
	write-ins	234	0.37
Total votes		63,394	100

=== Republican primary ===
==== Results ====
Republican Primary results
Party	Candidate	Votes	%
Republican	Derrick Kitts	36,565	97.93
	write-ins	772	2.07
Total votes		37,337	100

=== General election ===
==== Predictions ====
Source	Ranking	As of
The Cook Political Report	Safe D	November 6, 2006
Rothenberg	Safe D	November 6, 2006
Sabato's Crystal Ball	Safe D	November 6, 2006
Real Clear Politics	Safe D	November 7, 2006
CQ Politics	Safe D	November 7, 2006

==== Results ====
Incumbent Democratic Congressman David Wu has represented this liberal-leaning district based in northwestern Oregon and part of Portland. This year, Congressman Wu, seeking his fourth term, crushed Republican candidate Derrick Kitts in the general election to win another term in Congress.

Oregon's 1st congressional district election, 2006
Party	Candidate	Votes	%
Democratic	David Wu (incumbent)	169,409	62.83
Republican	Derrick Kitts	90,904	33.71
Libertarian	Drake Davis	4,497	1.67
Constitution	Dean Wolf	4,370	1.62
	write-ins	447	0.17
Total votes		269,627	100
Democratic hold			

== District 2 ==
2006 Oregon's 2nd congressional district election
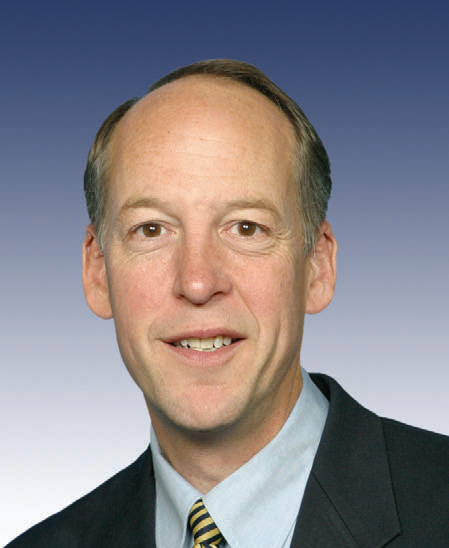

Nominee	Greg Walden	Carol Voisin
Party	Republican	Democratic
Popular vote	181,529	82,484
Percentage	66.8%	30.4%
- County results Walden: 50–60% 60–70% 70–80% 80–90%
U.S. Representative before election
Greg Walden
Republican
Elected U.S. Representative
Greg Walden
Republican

=== Democratic primary ===
==== Results ====
Democratic Primary results
Party	Candidate	Votes	%
Democratic	Carol Voisin	18,982	45.28
Democratic	Dan Davis	11,230	26.79
Democratic	Scott Silver	6,438	15.36
Democratic	Charles H. Butcher III	4,275	10.20
	write-ins	993	2.37
Total votes		41,918	100

=== Republican primary ===
==== Results ====
Republican Primary results
Party	Candidate	Votes	%
Republican	Greg Walden (incumbent)	70,519	90.21
Republican	Paul A. Daghlian	7,401	9.47
	write-ins	248	0.32
Total votes		78,168	100

=== General election ===
==== Predictions ====
Source	Ranking	As of
The Cook Political Report	Safe R	November 6, 2006
Rothenberg	Safe R	November 6, 2006
Sabato's Crystal Ball	Safe R	November 6, 2006
Real Clear Politics	Safe R	November 7, 2006
CQ Politics	Safe R	November 7, 2006

==== Results ====
In this heavily conservative, eastern Oregon-based district, which is one of the largest districts in the country, incumbent Republican Congressman Greg Walden ran for a fourth term. Democratic candidate Carol Voisin, a professor at Southern Oregon University, faced uphill odds against Walden, and ultimately, she was defeated in a landslide election, along with Constitution Party candidate Jack Brown.

Oregon's 2nd congressional district election, 2006
Party	Candidate	Votes	%
Republican	Greg Walden (incumbent)	181,529	66.81
Democratic	Carol Voisin	82,484	30.36
Constitution	Jack Alan Brown, Jr.	7,193	2.65
	write-ins	513	0.19
Total votes		271,719	100.00
Republican hold			

== District 3 ==
2006 Oregon's 3rd congressional district election
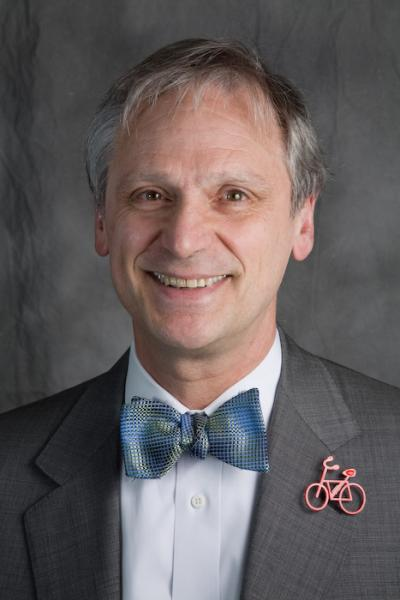

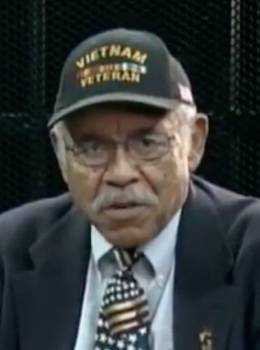
Nominee	Earl Blumenauer	Bruce Broussard
Party	Democratic	Republican
Popular vote	186,380	59,529
Percentage	73.5%	23.5%
- County results Blumenauer: 50–60% 70–80%
U.S. Representative before election
Earl Blumenauer
Democratic
Elected U.S. Representative
Earl Blumenauer
Democratic

=== Democratic primary ===
==== Results ====
Democratic Primary results
Party	Candidate	Votes	%
Democratic	Earl Blumenauer (incumbent)	63,350	90.72
Democratic	John Sweeney	6,338	9.08
	write-ins	146	0.21
Total votes		69,834	100

=== Republican primary ===
==== Results ====
Republican Primary results
Party	Candidate	Votes	%
Republican	Bruce Broussard (write-in)	353	18.02
	write-ins	1,606	81.98
Total votes		1,959	100

=== General election ===
==== Predictions ====
Source	Ranking	As of
The Cook Political Report	Safe D	November 6, 2006
Rothenberg	Safe D	November 6, 2006
Sabato's Crystal Ball	Safe D	November 6, 2006
Real Clear Politics	Safe D	November 7, 2006
CQ Politics	Safe D	November 7, 2006

==== Results ====
Democratic Congressman Earl Blumenauer, who has served in Congress since previous Congressman Ron Wyden was elected to the Senate in 1996, sought a sixth term in this district based in Portland and its suburbs in Clackamas County. Blumenauer was challenged by Republican Bruce Broussard and Constitution Party candidate David Brownlow. Blumenauer was elected to another term by the largest margin of victory of any Oregon Congressman.

Oregon's 3rd congressional district election, 2006
Party	Candidate	Votes	%
Democratic	Earl Blumenauer (incumbent)	186,380	73.49
Republican	Bruce Broussard	59,529	23.47
Constitution	David Brownlow	7,003	2.76
	write-ins	698	0.28
Total votes		253,610	100.00
Democratic hold			

== District 4 ==
2006 Oregon's 4th congressional district election
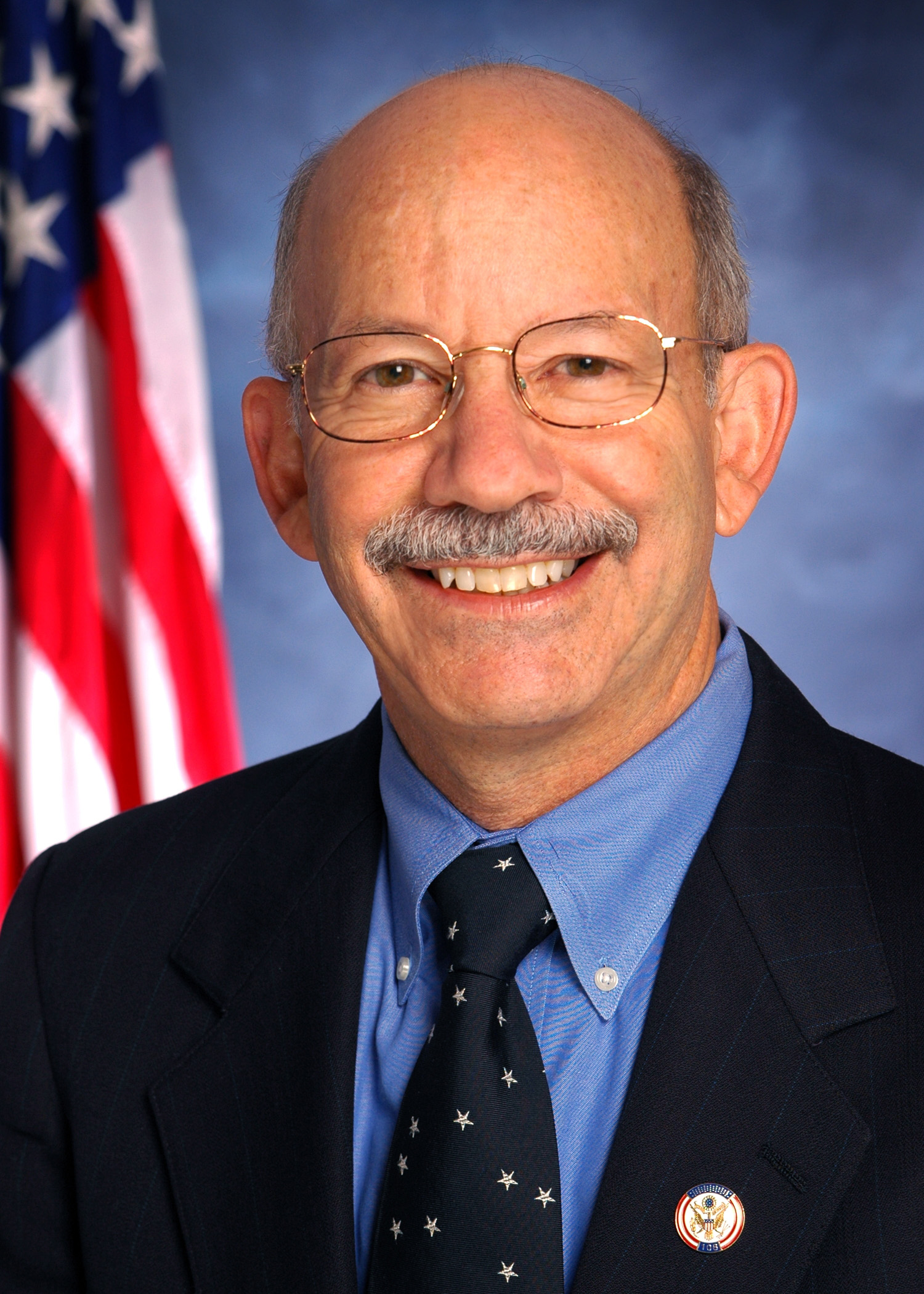

Nominee	Peter DeFazio	Jim Feldkamp
Party	Democratic	Republican
Popular vote	180,607	109,105
Percentage	62.2%	37.6%
- County results DeFazio: 50–60% 60–70% 70–80% Feldkamp: 50–60%
U.S. Representative before election
Peter DeFazio
Democratic
Elected U.S. Representative
Peter DeFazio
Democratic

=== Democratic primary ===
==== Results ====
Democratic Primary results
Party	Candidate	Votes	%
Democratic	Peter A. DeFazio (incumbent)	66,432	99.11
	write-ins	596	0.89
Total votes		67,028	100

=== Republican primary ===
==== Results ====
Republican Primary results
Party	Candidate	Votes	%
Republican	Jim Feldkamp	47,560	82.05
Republican	Monica Johnson	9,757	16.83
	write-ins	649	1.12
Total votes		57,966	100

=== General election ===
This Democratic-leaning district, based in the southern Pacific coastline of Oregon and including Eugene, Springfield, and Coos Bay, had the potential to be competitive. However, incumbent of twenty years Democrat Peter DeFazio won by a wide margin over Republican opponent Jim Feldkamp.

==== Predictions ====
Source	Ranking	As of
The Cook Political Report	Safe D	November 6, 2006
Rothenberg	Safe D	November 6, 2006
Sabato's Crystal Ball	Safe D	November 6, 2006
Real Clear Politics	Safe D	November 7, 2006
CQ Politics	Safe D	November 7, 2006

==== Results ====
Oregon's 4th congressional district election, 2006
Party	Candidate	Votes	%
Democratic	Peter DeFazio (incumbent)	180,607	62.23
Republican	Jim Feldkamp	109,105	37.59
	write-ins	532	0.18
Total votes		290,244	100.00
Democratic hold			

== District 5 ==
2006 Oregon's 5th congressional district election
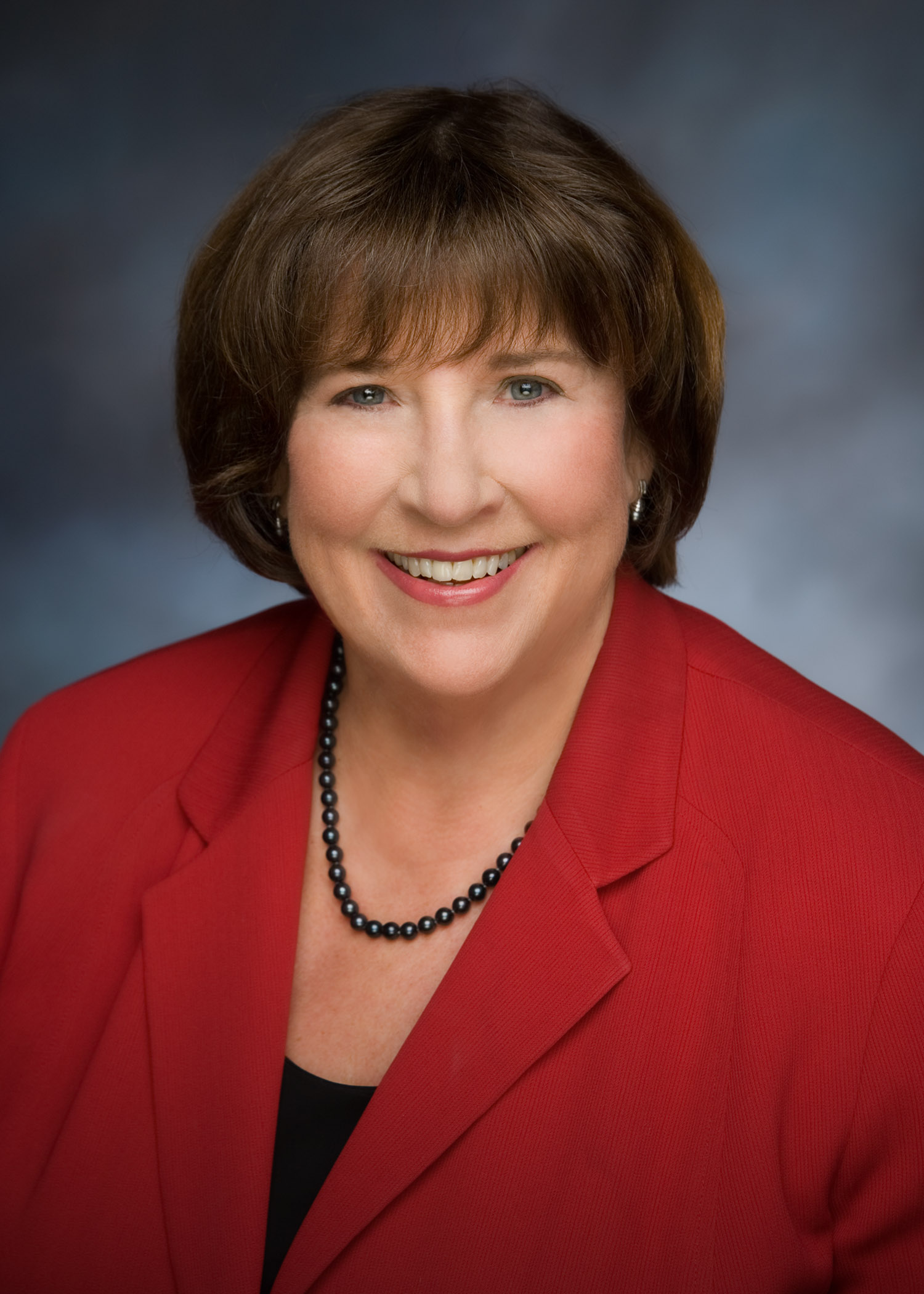

Nominee	Darlene Hooley	Mike Erickson
Party	Democratic	Republican
Popular vote	146,973	116,424
Percentage	54.0%	42.8%
- County results Hooley: 50–60% 70–80%
U.S. Representative before election
Darlene Hooley
Democratic
Elected U.S. Representative
Darlene Hooley
Democratic

=== Democratic primary ===
==== Results ====
Democratic Primary results
Party	Candidate	Votes	%
Democratic	Darlene Hooley (incumbent)	54,649	98.90
	write-ins	606	1.10
Total votes		55,255	100

=== Republican primary ===
==== Results ====
Republican Primary results
Party	Candidate	Votes	%
Republican	Mike Erickson	46,051	98.66
	write-ins	627	1.34
Total votes		46,678	100

=== General election ===
==== Predictions ====
Source	Ranking	As of
The Cook Political Report	Safe D	November 6, 2006
Rothenberg	Safe D	November 6, 2006
Sabato's Crystal Ball	Safe D	November 6, 2006
Real Clear Politics	Safe D	November 7, 2006
CQ Politics	Safe D	November 7, 2006

==== Results ====
This district, the most moderate in Oregon, covers portions of Portland, southern suburbs of Portland, some of the northern Pacific coast, and the state's capital, Salem. Congresswoman Darlene Hooley ran for a sixth term against businessman and former State House candidate Mike Erickson. In the closest election in Oregon that year, Hooley defeated Erickson by a fairly comfortable margin to serve her final term in Washington.

Oregon's 5th congressional district election, 2006
Party	Candidate	Votes	%
Democratic	Darlene Hooley (incumbent)	146,973	53.99
Republican	Mike Erickson	116,424	42.77
Pacific Green	Paul Aranas	4,194	1.54
Constitution	Douglas Patterson	4,160	1.53
	write-ins	483	0.18
Total votes		272,234	100.00
Democratic hold			

== See also ==
- United States House of Representatives elections, 2006
- Oregon state elections, 2006
- Oregon gubernatorial election, 2006
