= Soles4Souls =

American nonprofit organization

- Formation: 2006
- Founder: Wayne Elsey
- Type: Non-profit
- Purpose: Collecting and distributing donated shoes and clothing
- Headquarters: Nashville, Tennessee
- CEO: Buddy Teaster
- Website: soles4souls.org

Soles4Souls is a non-profit headquartered in Nashville, Tennessee. It receives shoe and clothing donations from individuals, community donation drives, and retailers. Then, Soles4Souls distributes the donated items to various programs around the world to help those in need. Items are repurposed either to provide relief or to help create jobs through the selling of clothes or shoes in developing countries.

Soles4Souls was founded in 2006 by Wayne Elsey. Elsey resigned in 2012 and was replaced by Buddy Teaster. Soles4Souls continues to focus on supporting entrepreneurship programs and expanding clothing donations.

== History ==
=== Early history ===
Soles4Souls was founded after a group of executives from the shoe industry donated shoes to survivors of a 2004 tsunami then to survivors of Hurricane Katrina in 2005. The Soles4Souls non-profit was formed the following year, in 2006 by founder Wayne Elsey. Early on, the non-profit received a grant for $20 million to fund its operations.

Under Elsey's leadership, by 2010, Soles4Souls had $76 million in annual revenues and 29 employees. The non-profit grew in large part thanks to a celebrity endorsement from Jessica Simpson, who donated 2,000 shoes. Soles4Souls also broke a Guinness World Record that year for the most shoes tied together into a chain. By 2011, the non-profit had distributed 19 million shoes. As of 2012, Soles4Souls had responded with crisis relief aid to more than 40 natural disasters worldwide. The charity also assisted individuals in developing nations and the U.S. by distributing pairs of shoes across 127 countries.

=== Leadership changes ===
Soles4Souls was one of the fastest growing charities in the United States, but it encountered some issues. Donors believed the shoes were given directly to those in need. However, the shoes were sold to wholesalers in developing nations to support microbusinesses. Elsey said he was always clear about how donated shoes were distributed and sold, both in official documents and in the media. A 2011 media investigation alleged Elsey used the organization to refinance his personal real estate; however, Elsey stated that the board leadership approved and took measures to protect the organization's assets during market crisis.

Elsey resigned in March 2012 and was replaced by Buddy Teaster in October 2012. By 2015, donating shoes to entrepreneurship programs to support local economies in developing countries became the non-profit's main focus. Between 2012 and 2019, donations to Soles4Souls grew 70% and the non-profit's revenues from shoe sales doubled.

=== Recent history ===
In 2017, Soles4Souls acquired Florida-based Dignity U Wear, a non-profit that collects donated clothing and distributes it in impoverished neighborhood.

By 2020, donations to Soles4Souls were increasing substantially. DSW customers reached three million shoe donations and Zappos shoppers donated one million. In one year, Crocs donated twice as many shoes as the prior four years combined.

In May 2022, Soles4Souls announced they were the recipients of a $1 million donation from American footwear company Caleres. The donation of $500,000 and $500,000 in product donation, will aim in providing shoes for homeless children through the 4EveryKid initiative.

In March 2026, Soles4Souls announced that they acquired Erren Recondition, a European based company, in order to expand their footwear and apparel circularity offerings to brands.

== Shoes and clothing ==
Soles4Souls receives clothing and shoe donations, then distributes them to provide relief and create jobs. Items are donated by individuals that pack and ship items to Soles4Souls, donation drives at schools and churches, and samples, excess inventory, or other donations from businesses. The majority of Soles4Souls shoe donations come from retailers that provide shoes with defects or that weren't selling well. Soles4Souls prefers items in good condition but even shoes in poor condition are recycled.

As of 2020, Soles4Souls has distributed 50 million pairs of shoes or items of clothing in 129 countries. As of 2010, about 55 percent of the shoes are distributed in the United States and 45 percent are distributed abroad. As of 2020, about 75% of the shoes are sold to other non-profits that operate microenterprise programs in developing countries. Those non-profits sell the shoes to small business owners, that sell them at local marketplaces in developing countries in order to support their family. Soles4Souls charges a fee for the shoes that is used to support its operations. As of 2020, used clothing has been an increasing portion of Soles4Souls' operations. Most clothing donations are sold overseas.
