= Darlene Hooley =

American politician (born 1939)

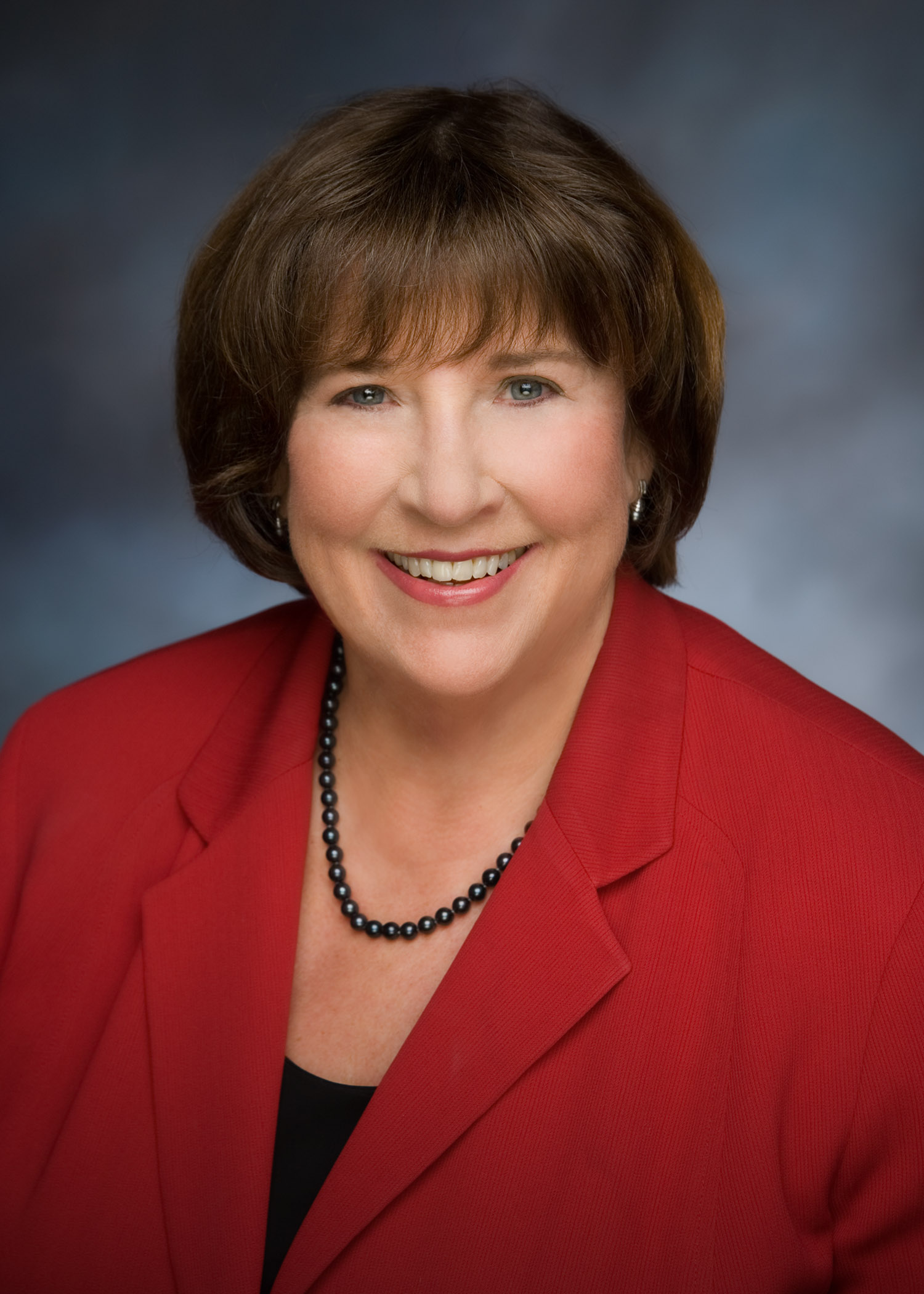

Member of the U.S. House of Representatives from Oregon's 5th district
- In office January 3, 1997 – January 3, 2009
- Preceded by: Jim Bunn
- Succeeded by: Kurt Schrader

Personal details
- Born: Darlene Kay Olson; April 4, 1939 (age 87) Williston, North Dakota, U.S.
- Party: Democratic
- Education: Point Loma Nazarene University; Oregon State University (BS)

Darlene Kay Olson Hooley (born April 4, 1939) is an American politician and former Democratic member of the U.S. House of Representatives from Oregon who represented the state's 5th congressional district.

A high school teacher by profession, she served as a city councilwoman, state legislator, and county commissioner in Oregon before being elected to the House in 1996. In her post-congressional career, she remains engaged in civic life in Oregon and works as a strategic planning consultant.

== Early life ==
Darlene Kay Olson was born in Williston, North Dakota to Clarence Alvin and Alyce Rogers Olson, who were wheat farmers. She moved with her parents to Salem, Oregon at the age of 8. She attended Salem Academy, and then Pasadena Nazarene College (now Point Loma Nazarene University) in southern California, where she also worked as a lifeguard. She returned to Oregon and earned her degree in education from Oregon State University in 1961, where she was on the basketball, field hockey, and rowing teams. Following her graduation, she taught reading, music, and high school physical education for eight years at schools in Woodburn, Gervais, and Portland. She also did post-graduate work at Oregon State and Portland State University.

== Early political career ==
Hooley became interested in politics after her son was injured on a playground in West Linn. She was appointed to a parks advisory committee, and in 1976, became the first woman elected to serve on the West Linn City Council. In 1980, Hooley was elected to the Oregon State Legislature and served as a State Representative until 1987 from the 27th district. In the legislature she served in the lower chamber (Oregon House of Representatives) as a Democrat representing Clackamas County (District 27), succeeding Republican Ted Achilles. She chaired the environmental and energy committees, helping to pass energy conservation and recycling legislation and worked on rewriting land use planning laws. In her third term, she chaired the education subcommittee of the ways and means committee. As subcommittee chair, she is credited with leading reforms to Oregon's public kindergarten, pay equity laws, and welfare system. Hooley left the legislature in 1987 to accept a position on the Clackamas County Board of Commissioners.

== U.S. House ==
=== Elections ===
In 1996, Hooley ran for the U.S. House of Representatives against one-term incumbent Republican Jim Bunn, who had been voted in as part of the Republican Revolution of 1994. Hooley won 51% of the vote in a field that included Bunn and two minor party candidates. Ironically, while Bunn's loss was attributed in part to his divorce and remarriage during his only term, Hooley also divorced during her first term in 1997.

In the 2006 election, Hooley won a sixth term, defeating Republican Mike Erickson (who spent over $1 million of his own money), Green Paul Aranas, and Constitution candidate Douglas Patterson. She filed to run for a seventh term in 2008, but in February 2008 announced she would not seek an additional term, creating an unexpected open seat in the 2008 election.

=== Tenure ===
In her first term in the U.S. House, Hooley was elected House Democratic freshman class president. Local political observers reported that she solidified support in her closely divided district, by staking out moderate positions, avoiding controversy and scandal. In later terms, she was appointed to leadership positions in the House Democratic Caucus.

Following the September 11, 2001 attacks, Hooley, a member of the House Financial Services Committee, advocated adapting banking laws and acting to disrupt the financial foundations of terrorist networks. She has also focused on issues surrounding identity theft prevention and increasing medical and financial privacy. In 2003, she was a key sponsor of the Fair and Accurate Credit Transaction Act (HR 2622), which gave Americans the ability to receive free annual credit reports.

She also focused on methamphetamines and ecoterrorism legislation, and supported the Oregon Death with Dignity Act.

In 2002, Hooley voted against the authorization of the use of military force in Iraq. As a member of the Veterans' Affairs Committee, she focused on issues of veterans' health care and deployment of National Guard troops to the Iraq War.

Hooley was a staunch advocate of a federal prohibition of online poker. In 2006, she cosponsored H.R. 4411, the Goodlatte-Leach Internet Gambling Prohibition Act. She was also successful in directing federal funding to her district, including millions of dollars for transportation, timber, and agricultural interests.

=== Committees ===
She served on the Science and Technology, Energy and Commerce, and Budget committees. She was a House Senior Whip for the Democratic Party and a member of the New Democrat Coalition.

== Electoral history ==
Oregon's 5th congressional district: Results 1996–2006
Year	Democratic	Votes	Pct	Republican	Votes	Pct		3rd Party	Party	Votes	Pct	3rd Party	Party	Votes	Pct	
1996	Darlene Hooley	139,521	51%	Jim Bunn	125,409	46%		Lawrence Knight Duquesne	Libertarian	5,191	2%	Trey Smith	Socialist	2,124	1%	*
1998	Darlene Hooley	124,916	55%	Marylin Shannon	92,215	41%		Michael Donnelly	Pacific Green	3,637	2%	Blaine Thallheimer	Libertarian	2,979	1%	*
2000	Darlene Hooley	156,315	57%	Brian J. Boquist	118,631	43%	*									
2002	Darlene Hooley	137,713	55%	Brian J. Boquist	113,441	45%	*									
2004	Darlene Hooley	184,833	53%	Jim Zupancic	154,993	44%		Jerry Defoe	Libertarian	6,463	2%	Joseph H. Bitz	Constitution	2,971	1%	*
2006	Darlene Hooley	146,973	54%	Mike Erickson	116,424	43%		Paul Aranas	Pacific Green	4,194	2%	Douglas Patterson	Constitution	4,160	2%	*
* In 1996, minor candidates received 391 votes. In 1998, Natural Law candidate Jim Burns received 2,284 votes (1%); Socialist candidate Ed Dover received 1,378 votes; and minor candidates received 248 votes. In 2000, write-ins received 402 votes. In 2002, minor candidates received 383 votes. In 2004, minor candidates received 374 votes. In 2006, write-ins received 483 votes.

== Post-congressional career ==
After leaving Congress, Hooley joined former Multnomah County Commissioner Lisa Naito in founding Hooley & Naito, a strategic planning and legislative advocacy firm.

Hooley remains active in supporting veterans and established the Darlene Hooley Scholarship for Oregon Veterans, under the auspices of the Oregon Community Foundation.

In 2012, the City of Portland dedicated the Darlene Hooley Pedestrian Bridge, a bridge that connects the Lair Hill neighborhood to the South Waterfront district.

Hooley is a member of the ReFormers Caucus of Issue One.

== See also ==
- Women in the United States House of Representatives

U.S. House of Representatives
Preceded by Jim Bunn	Member of the U.S. House of Representatives from Oregon's 5th congressional district 1997–2009	Succeeded by Kurt Schrader
U.S. order of precedence (ceremonial)
Preceded by Keith Ellison as Former U.S. Representative	Order of precedence of the United States as Former U.S. Representative	Succeeded by David Wu as Former U.S. Representative
