= Lynn Peterson (American politician) =

American politician (born 1968)

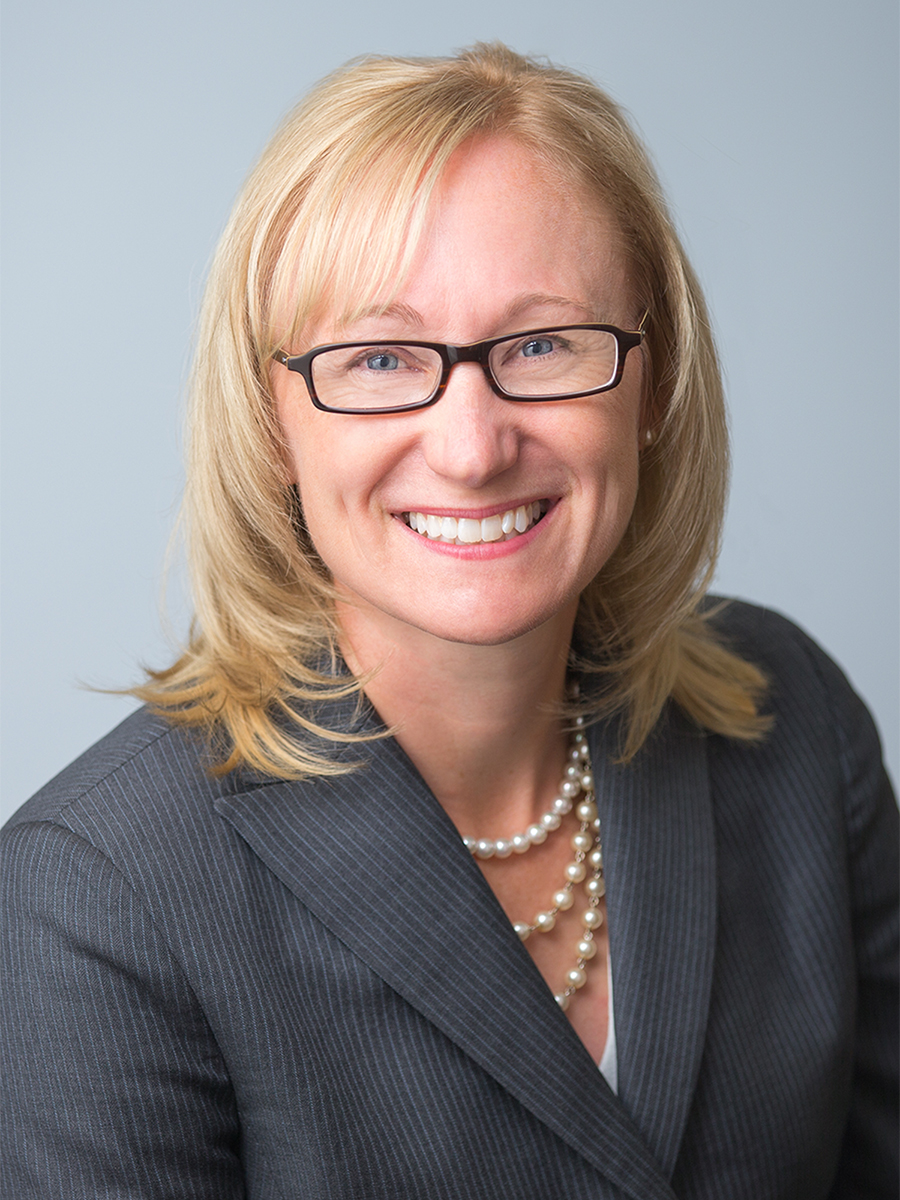

President of Metro
- In office January 7, 2019 – March 13, 2026

Secretary of Transportation of Washington
- In office 2013–2016

Personal details
- Born: October 22, 1968 (age 57) Wisconsin, U.S.
- Party: Democratic
- Spouse: Mark Peterson
- Education: University of Wisconsin

Lynn Ann Peterson (born October 22, 1968) is an American politician in the U.S. state of Oregon serving as the interim city manager of Lake Oswego and the former council president of Metro. She has also been on the Lake Oswego city council, the chair of the Clackamas County Board of Commissioners and served as the Washington state Secretary of Transportation.

== Career ==
Peterson's career began in 1988 as an engineer for the Wisconsin Department of Transportation. Peterson has worked as a travel forecaster for Metro, a transportation advocate for 1000 Friends of Oregon, a strategic planner for TriMet, and as an independent consultant.

Peterson began her political career as a city councilor in Lake Oswego, Oregon from 2003 to 2006. She served as the chair of Clackamas County Commission from 2007 to 2011.

She resigned from the Clackamas County Commission when she was appointed to be a transportation adviser to Oregon governor John Kitzhaber.

In 2013, she was appointed by Washington governor Jay Inslee as Secretary of Transportation, the chief of the Washington State Department of Transportation, where she guided Washington's largest transportation funding package in its history: $16 billion. In 2016, she was not confirmed by the Republican-controlled state senate, resulting in a controversial end to her WSDOT tenure. Governor Inslee responded critically to the Republicans' action.

Peterson was sworn in as Metro President on January 7, 2019. Metro is the only directly-elected regional government in the United States, providing varied services to the urban portions of three counties in the Portland, Oregon, area. She received 78 percent of the vote, defeating one opponent to replace Tom Hughes, who had served the limit of two consecutive terms. She had been endorsed by many Oregon elected officials, and her campaign included a 24-city bike tour.

On September 7, 2021, Peterson announced she will run for reelection. She won a second term in the primary by receiving more than 50% of the vote.

On June 8, 2023, Peterson announced that she would be seeking the Democratic nomination for Oregon's 5th congressional district, currently held by Republican Lori Chavez-DeRemer. She withdrew from the race on February 19, 2024.

On March 13, 2026, she resigned from Metro to become the interim city manager of Lake Oswego.

== Personal life ==
Peterson lives in Lake Oswego, Oregon, with her husband and three Alaskan malamute dogs. In 2022, she wrote a book, Roadways for People: Rethinking Transportation Planning and Engineering, along with Elizabeth Doerr.
