= 2022 United States House of Representatives elections in Oregon =

- November 8, 2022

All 6 Oregon seats to the United States House of Representatives
	Majority party	Minority party
Party	Democratic	Republican
Last election	4	1
Seats won	4	2
Seat change	Steady	▲1
Popular vote	1,012,725	851,991
Percentage	53.11%	44.68%
Swing	▼2.58%	▲2.79%

Democratic hold Democratic gain
Republican hold Republican gain
Democratic
40–50%
50–60%
60–70%
70–80%
Republican
50–60%
60–70%
70–80%
80–90%

The 2022 United States House of Representatives elections in Oregon were held on November 8, 2022, to elect the six U.S. representatives from the state of Oregon, one from each of the state's six congressional districts. Primaries for these seats were held on May 17, 2022. The elections coincided with the elections and primaries of other federal and state offices.

District boundaries were redrawn to ensure that the districts are apportioned based on data from the 2020 United States census, which added a sixth seat to Oregon's delegation. Democrats won the new sixth district, but Republicans gained Oregon's fifth district, leaving the congressional delegation with a four to two party split in favor of the Democrats. This was the first time since 1994 that Republicans won more than one House seat in Oregon.

== Redistricting ==
Ahead of the 2022 elections, Oregon redrew its congressional districts as part of the 2020 United States redistricting cycle. Oregon gained a sixth congressional district during this cycle. On September 20, 2021, the Oregon State Senate passed new congressional maps that were favored by Democrats on a party-line vote, along with state legislative maps. The congressional map contained five Democratic-leaning districts and one Republican-leaning district. Tina Kotek, the Democratic speaker of the Oregon House of Representatives, had negotiated a deal with Republicans to give them equal say on redistricting matters, but she abandoned the deal after the Senate passed its maps. House Democrats made changes to the proposed congressional map that made it less favorable towards Democrats, but Republicans still opposed the map. In response, House Republicans skipped a floor session, which denied House Democrats a quorum and blocked them from being able to pass their maps. On September 27, the legislature's deadline to approve new maps, most House Republicans showed up to vote. The House's proposed congressional map passed the House and Senate on party-line votes, and was approved by governor Kate Brown the same day.

== Overview ==
=== District ===
District	Democratic		Republican		Others		Total		Result
District	Votes	%	Votes	%	Votes	%	Votes	%	Result
District 1	210,682	67.91%	99,042	31.92%	519	0.17%	310,243	100.00%	Democratic hold
District 2	99,882	32.36%	208,369	67.50%	425	0.14%	308,676	100.00%	Republican hold
District 3	212,119	69.93%	79,766	26.30%	11,449	3.77%	303,334	100.00%	Democratic hold
District 4	171,372	50.54%	146,055	43.07%	21,650	6.38%	339,077	100.00%	Democratic hold
District 5	171,514	48.83%	178,813	50.91%	906	0.26%	351,233	100.00%	Republican gain
District 6	147,156	49.99%	139,946	47.54%	7,275	2.47%	294,377	100.00%	Democratic gain
Total	1,012,725	53.11%	851,991	44.68%	42,224	2.21%	1,906,940	100.00%	

Popular vote
Democratic	53.11%
Republican	44.68%
Other	2.21%

House seats
Democratic	66.67%
Republican	33.33%

=== County ===
County	Democratic		Republican		Others		Margin		Total
County	#	%	#	%	#	%	#	%	Total
Baker	1,764	20.72%	6,739	79.16%	10	0.12%	-4,975	-58.44%	8,513
Benton	28,067	62.51%	13,818	30.78%	3,014	6.71%	14,249	31.74%	44,899
Clackamas	102,298	49.06%	104,547	50.14%	1,664	0.80%	-2,249	-1.08%	208,509
Clatsop	11,046	56.70%	8,421	43.23%	13	0.07%	2,625	13.48%	19,480
Columbia	11,548	43.96%	14,686	55.91%	35	0.13%	-3,138	-11.95%	26,269
Coos	10,761	34.69%	18,184	58.61%	2,079	6.70%	-7,423	-23.93%	31,024
Crook	2,849	20.78%	10,847	79.10%	17	0.12%	-7,998	-58.32%	13,713
Curry	4,566	36.52%	7,232	57.84%	706	5.65%	-2,666	-21.32%	12,504
Deschutes	53,822	50.28%	53,034	49.54%	192	0.18%	788	0.74%	107,048
Douglas	14,074	26.79%	35,098	66.81%	3,359	6.39%	-21,024	-40.02%	52,531
Gilliam	202	21.17%	749	78.51%	3	0.31%	-547	-57.34%	954
Grant	690	17.09%	3,333	82.56%	14	0.35%	-2,643	-65.47%	4,037
Harney	593	15.73%	3,161	83.87%	15	0.40%	-2,568	-68.13%	3,769
Hood River	6,620	62.46%	3,608	34.04%	371	3.50%	3,012	28.42%	10,599
Jackson	44,006	43.15%	57,884	56.75%	101	0.10%	-13,878	-13.61%	101,991
Jefferson	2,939	30.51%	6,679	69.33%	16	0.17%	-3,740	-38.82%	9,634
Josephine	13,377	32.10%	28,253	67.81%	38	0.09%	-14,876	-35.70%	41,668
Klamath	7,155	24.27%	22,287	75.60%	40	0.14%	-15,132	-51.33%	29,482
Lake	583	14.88%	3,323	84.81%	12	0.31%	-2,740	-69.93%	3,918
Lane	102,200	56.13%	68,996	37.89%	10,891	5.98%	33,204	18.24%	182,087
Lincoln	13,872	53.80%	10,298	39.94%	1,614	6.26%	3,574	13.86%	25,784
Linn	19,434	32.44%	40,235	67.17%	231	0.39%	-20,801	-34.73%	59,900
Malheur	1,796	19.90%	7,216	79.94%	15	0.17%	-5,420	-60.04%	9,027
Marion	56,119	43.27%	70,336	54.23%	3,237	2.50%	-14,217	-10.96%	129,692
Morrow	846	21.49%	3,086	78.40%	4	0.10%	-2,240	-56.91%	3,936
Multnomah	281,925	78.43%	67,246	18.71%	10,279	2.86%	214,679	59.72%	359,450
Polk	17,583	43.35%	21,906	54.00%	1,074	2.65%	-4,323	-10.66%	40,563
Sherman	161	16.25%	829	83.65%	1	0.10%	-668	-67.41%	991
Tillamook	6,724	48.26%	7,172	51.48%	36	0.26%	-448	-3.22%	13,932
Umatilla	6,493	26.78%	17,730	73.13%	23	0.09%	-11,237	-46.35%	24,246
Union	3,104	25.65%	8,972	74.14%	25	0.21%	-5,868	-48.49%	12,101
Wallowa	1,288	28.71%	3,194	71.18%	5	0.11%	-1,906	-42.48%	4,487
Wasco	4,655	42.08%	6,390	57.76%	18	0.16%	-1,735	-15.68%	11,063
Washington	158,870	63.59%	89,259	35.73%	1,716	0.69%	69,611	27.86%	249,845
Wheeler	160	20.08%	632	79.30%	5	0.63%	-472	-59.22%	797
Yamhill	20,535	42.34%	26,611	54.87%	1,351	2.79%	-6,076	-12.53%	48,497
Totals	1,012,725	53.11%	851,991	44.68%	42,224	2.21%	160,734	8.43%	1,906,940

=== Counties that flipped from Democratic to Republican ===
- Clackamas (largest city: Lake Oswego)

=== Counties that flipped from Republican to Democratic ===
- Deschutes (largest city: Bend)

== District 1 ==
2022 Oregon's 1st congressional district election
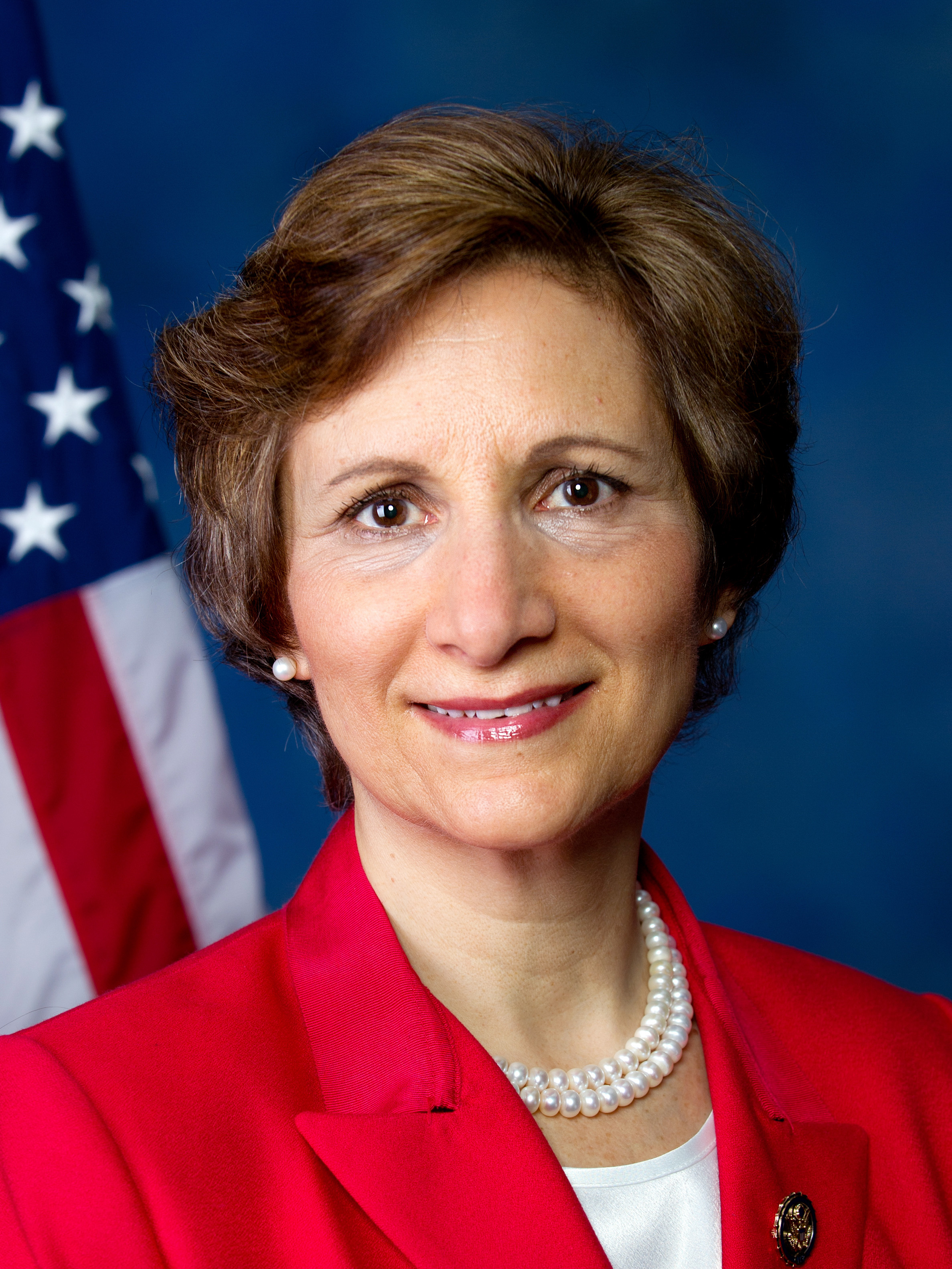

Nominee	Suzanne Bonamici	Christopher Mann
Party	Democratic	Republican
Popular vote	210,682	99,042
Percentage	67.9%	31.9%
- County results Bonamici: 50–60% 60–70% 80–90% Mann: 50–60%
U.S. Representative before election
Suzanne Bonamici
Democratic
Elected U.S. Representative
Suzanne Bonamici
Democratic

From 2012 to 2020, the 1st district was located in northwestern Oregon and included the western Portland metro area, including the Portland suburbs of Beaverton and Hillsboro, and parts of Portland west of the Willamette River. The district was kept largely the same despite redistricting, exchanging Yamhill County for Tillamook County and taking in more of Portland. The incumbent was Democrat Suzanne Bonamici, who was re-elected with 64.6% of the vote in 2020.

=== Democratic primary ===
==== Candidates ====
===== Nominee =====
- Suzanne Bonamici, incumbent U.S. representative

===== Eliminated in primary =====
- Scott Phillips
- Christian Robertson

==== Endorsements ====
Suzanne Bonamici

Organizations

- Feminist Majority PAC
- Humane Society of the United States Legislative Fund
- League of Conservation Voters
- NARAL Pro-Choice America
- Oregon Working Families Party
- Planned Parenthood Action Fund
- Sierra Club

Labor unions

- Oregon Education Association PAC
- Service Employees International Union Oregon State Council

==== Results ====
Democratic primary results
Party	Candidate	Votes	%
Democratic	Suzanne Bonamici (incumbent)	80,317	88.5
Democratic	Scott Phillips	7,832	8.6
Democratic	Christian Robertson	2,625	2.9
Total votes		90,774	100.0

=== Republican primary ===
==== Candidates ====
===== Nominee =====
- Christopher Mann

===== Eliminated in primary =====
- Armidia "Army" Murray, former UPS worker and candidate for this seat in 2020

==== Results ====
Republican primary results
Party	Candidate	Votes	%
Republican	Christopher Mann	19,605	68.4
Republican	Armidia "Army" Murray	9,047	31.6
Total votes		28,652	100.0

=== General election ===
==== Predictions ====
Source	Ranking	As of
The Cook Political Report	Solid D	October 5, 2021
Inside Elections	Solid D	October 14, 2021
Sabato's Crystal Ball	Safe D	October 5, 2021
Politico	Solid D	April 5, 2022
RCP	Safe D	June 9, 2022
Fox News	Solid D	July 11, 2022
DDHQ	Solid D	July 20, 2022
538	Solid D	June 30, 2022
The Economist	Safe D	September 28, 2022

==== Results ====
2022 Oregon's 1st congressional district election
Party	Candidate	Votes	%
Democratic	Suzanne Bonamici (incumbent)	210,682	67.9
Republican	Christopher Mann	99,042	31.9
Write-in		519	0.2
Total votes		310,243	100.0
Democratic hold			

==== By county ====
County	Suzanne Bonamici Democratic		Christopher Mann Republican		Write-in Various		Margin		Total
County	#	%	#	%	#	%	#	%	Total
Clatsop	11,046	56.70%	8,421	43.23%	13	0.07%	2,625	13.48%	19,480
Columbia	11,548	43.96%	14,686	55.91%	35	0.13%	-3,138	-11.95%	26,269
Multnomah (part)	72,580	88.41%	9,408	11.46%	108	0.13%	63,172	76.95%	82,096
Tillamook	6,724	48.26%	7,172	51.48%	36	0.26%	-448	-3.22%	13,932
Washington (part)	108,784	64.57%	59,355	35.23%	327	0.19%	49,429	29.34%	168,466
Totals	210,682	67.91%	99,042	31.92%	519	0.17%	111,640	35.98%	310,243

== District 2 ==
2022 Oregon's 2nd congressional district election
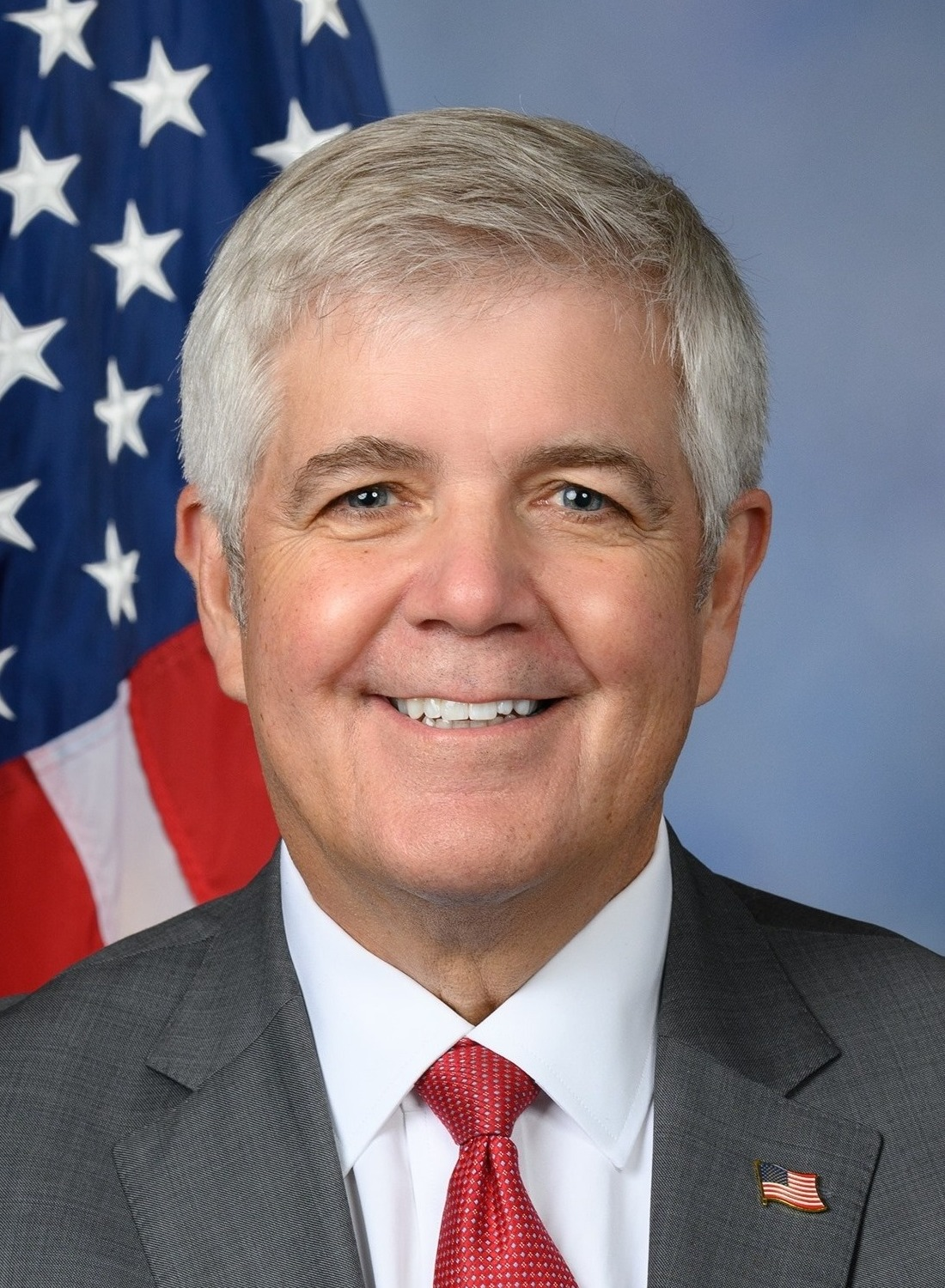

Nominee	Cliff Bentz	Joseph Yetter
Party	Republican	Democratic
Popular vote	208,369	99,882
Percentage	67.5%	32.4%
- County results Bentz: 50–60% 60–70% 70–80% 80–90%
U.S. Representative before election
Cliff Bentz
Republican
Elected U.S. Representative
Cliff Bentz
Republican

From 2012 to 2020, the 2nd district was the largest of Oregon's districts and covered roughly two-thirds of the state east of the Cascades, encompassing the central, eastern, and southern regions of the state, including Bend and Medford. The district was kept mostly the same during redistricting, but it did lose Bend to the 5th district and Hood River County to the 3rd, while taking in all of Josephine County and about half of Douglas County. The incumbent was Republican Cliff Bentz, who was elected with 59.9% of the vote in 2020.

=== Republican primary ===
==== Candidates ====
===== Nominee =====
- Cliff Bentz, incumbent U.S. representative

===== Eliminated in primary =====
- Mark Cavener, producer and nonprofit executive
- Katherine Gallant, political commentator

==== Endorsements ====
Cliff Bentz

Organizations

- National Rifle Association-Political Victory Fund

==== Results ====
Republican primary results
Party	Candidate	Votes	%
Republican	Cliff Bentz (incumbent)	67,051	75.3
Republican	Mark Cavener	17,372	19.5
Republican	Katherine Gallant	4,598	5.2
Total votes		89,021	100.0

=== Democratic primary ===
==== Candidates ====
===== Nominee =====
- Joseph Yetter III, retired U.S. Army colonel, physician and farmer

===== Eliminated in primary =====
- Adam Prine, farmhand

==== Results ====
Democratic primary results
Party	Candidate	Votes	%
Democratic	Joseph Yetter III	27,814	70.4
Democratic	Adam Prine	11,669	29.6
Total votes		39,483	100.0

=== General election ===
==== Predictions ====
Source	Ranking	As of
The Cook Political Report	Solid R	October 5, 2021
Inside Elections	Solid R	October 14, 2021
Sabato's Crystal Ball	Safe R	October 5, 2021
Politico	Solid R	April 5, 2022
RCP	Safe R	June 9, 2022
Fox News	Solid R	July 11, 2022
DDHQ	Solid R	July 20, 2022
538	Solid R	June 30, 2022
The Economist	Safe R	September 28, 2022

==== Results ====
2022 Oregon's 2nd congressional district election
Party	Candidate	Votes	%
Republican	Cliff Bentz (incumbent)	208,369	67.5
Democratic	Joseph Yetter III	99,882	32.4
Write-in		425	0.1
Total votes		308,676	100.0
Republican hold			

==== By county ====
County	Cliff Bentz Republican		Joseph Yetter III Democratic		Write-in Various		Margin		Total
County	#	%	#	%	#	%	#	%	Total
Baker	6,739	79.16%	1,764	20.72%	10	0.12%	4,975	58.44%	8,513
Crook	10,847	79.10%	2,849	20.78%	17	0.12%	7,998	58.32%	13,713
Deschutes (part)	9,177	66.00%	4,710	33.87%	18	0.13%	4,467	32.13%	13,905
Douglas (part)	7,888	75.50%	2,514	24.06%	45	0.43%	5,374	51.44%	10,447
Gilliam	749	78.51%	202	21.17%	3	0.31%	547	57.34%	954
Grant	3,333	82.56%	690	17.09%	14	0.35%	2,643	65.47%	4,037
Harney	3,161	83.87%	593	15.73%	15	0.40%	2,568	68.13%	3,769
Jackson	57,884	56.75%	44,006	43.15%	101	0.10%	13,878	13.61%	101,991
Jefferson (part)	6,679	69.35%	2,936	30.48%	16	0.17%	3,743	38.86%	9,631
Josephine	28,253	67.81%	13,377	32.10%	38	0.09%	14,876	35.70%	41,668
Klamath	22,287	75.60%	7,155	24.27%	40	0.14%	15,132	51.33%	29,482
Lake	3,323	84.81%	583	14.88%	12	0.31%	2,740	69.93%	3,918
Malheur	7,216	79.94%	1,796	19.90%	15	0.17%	5,420	60.04%	9,027
Morrow	3,086	78.40%	846	21.49%	4	0.10%	2,240	56.91%	3,936
Sherman	829	83.65%	161	16.25%	1	0.10%	668	67.41%	991
Umatilla	17,730	73.13%	6,493	26.78%	23	0.09%	11,237	46.35%	24,246
Union	8,972	74.14%	3,104	25.65%	25	0.21%	5,868	48.49%	12,101
Wallowa	3,194	71.18%	1,288	28.71%	5	0.11%	1,906	42.48%	4,487
Wasco	6,390	57.76%	4,655	42.08%	18	0.16%	1,735	15.68%	11,063
Wheeler	632	79.30%	160	20.08%	5	0.63%	472	59.22%	797
Totals	208,369	67.50%	99,882	32.36%	425	0.14%	108,487	35.15%	308,676

== District 3 ==
2022 Oregon's 3rd congressional district election
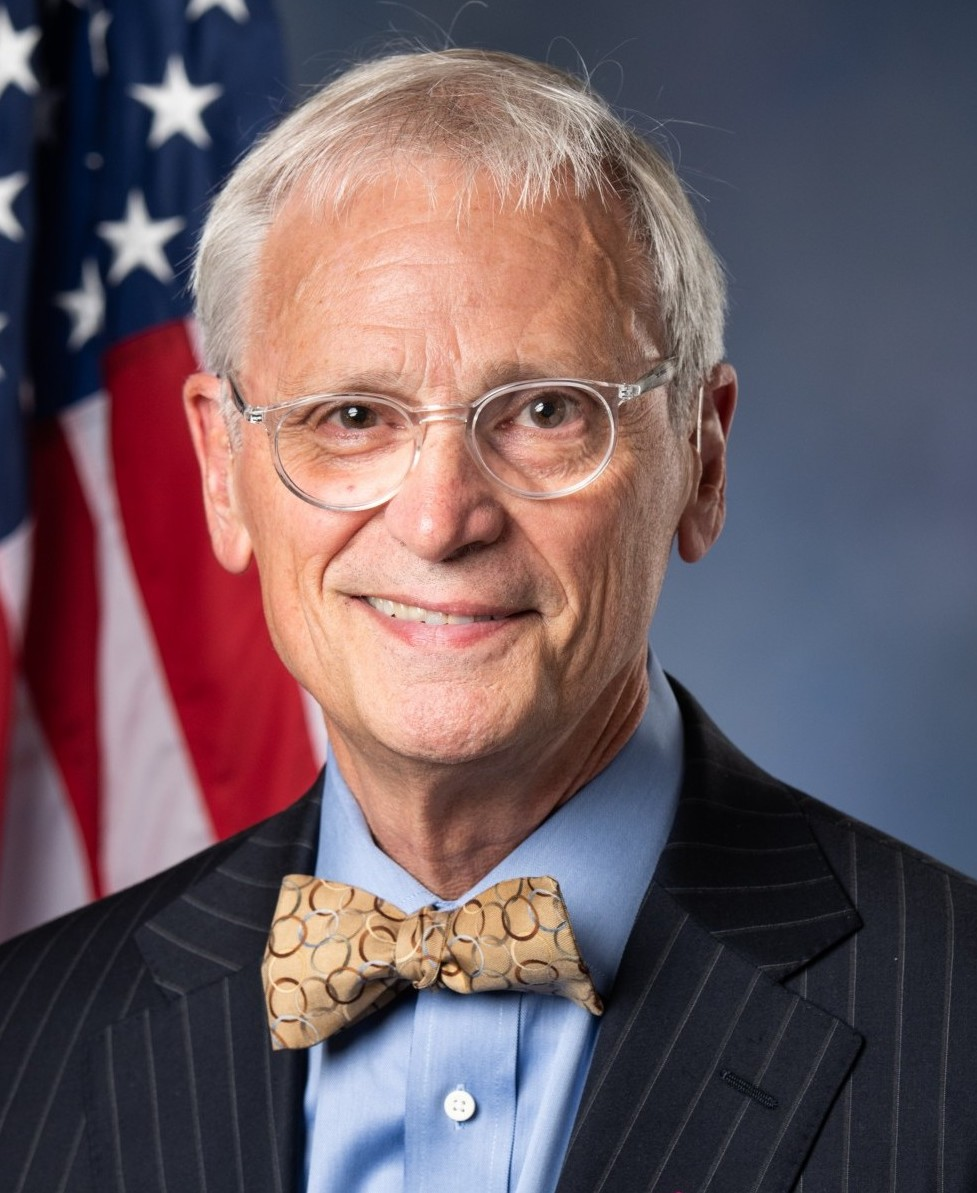

Nominee	Earl Blumenauer	Joanna Harbour
Party	Democratic	Republican
Popular vote	212,119	79,766
Percentage	69.9%	26.3%
- County results Blumenaur: 60–70% 70–80% Harbour: 50–60%
U.S. Representative before election
Earl Blumenauer
Democratic
Elected U.S. Representative
Earl Blumenauer
Democratic

From 2012 to 2020, the 3rd district encompassed the eastern Portland metro area, covering Portland and Gresham. The district was kept largely the same despite redistricting, though it did take in Hood River County, and lost some of Portland to the 1st district. The incumbent was Democrat Earl Blumenauer, who was re-elected with 73.0% of the vote in 2020.

=== Democratic primary ===
==== Candidates ====
===== Nominee =====
- Earl Blumenauer, incumbent U.S. representative

===== Eliminated in primary =====
- Jonathan E. Polhemus

==== Endorsements ====
Earl Blumenauer

Organizations

- Progressive Democrats of America
- Sierra Club

Labor unions

- Oregon Education Association PAC
- Service Employees International Union Oregon State Council

==== Results ====
Democratic primary results
Party	Candidate	Votes	%
Democratic	Earl Blumenauer (incumbent)	96,386	94.7
Democratic	Jonathan E. Polhemus	5,392	5.3
Total votes		101,778	100.0

=== Republican primary ===
==== Candidates ====
===== Nominee =====
- Joanna Harbour, attorney and nominee for this district in 2020

==== Results ====
Republican primary results
Party	Candidate	Votes	%
Republican	Joanna Harbour	18,031	100.0
Total votes		18,031	100.0

=== General election ===
==== Predictions ====
Source	Ranking	As of
The Cook Political Report	Solid D	October 5, 2021
Inside Elections	Solid D	October 14, 2021
Sabato's Crystal Ball	Safe D	October 5, 2021
Politico	Solid D	April 5, 2022
RCP	Safe D	June 9, 2022
Fox News	Solid D	July 11, 2022
DDHQ	Solid D	July 20, 2022
538	Solid D	June 30, 2022
The Economist	Safe D	September 28, 2022

==== Results ====
2022 Oregon's 3rd congressional district election
Party	Candidate	Votes	%
Democratic	Earl Blumenauer (incumbent)	212,119	69.9
Republican	Joanna Harbour	79,766	26.3
Progressive	David E Delk	10,982	3.6
Write-in		467	0.2
Total votes		303,334	100.0
Democratic hold			

==== By county ====
County	Earl Blumenauer Democratic		Joanna Harbour Republican		Various candidates Other parties		Margin		Total
County	#	%	#	%	#	%	#	%	Total
Clackamas (part)	16,663	40.52%	23,511	57.17%	949	2.31%	-6,848	-16.65%	41,123
Hood River	6,620	62.46%	3,608	34.04%	371	3.50%	3,012	28.42%	10,599
Multnomah (part)	188,836	75.05%	52,647	20.92%	10,129	4.03%	136,189	54.13%	251,612
Totals	212,119	69.93%	79,766	26.30%	11,449	3.77%	132,353	43.63%	303,334

== District 4 ==
2022 Oregon's 4th congressional district election
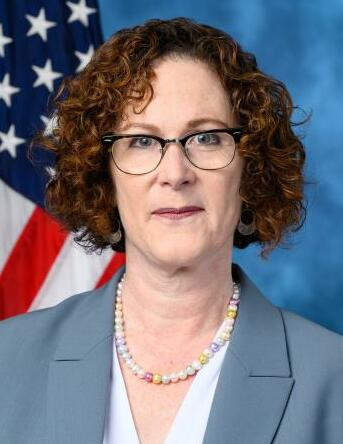

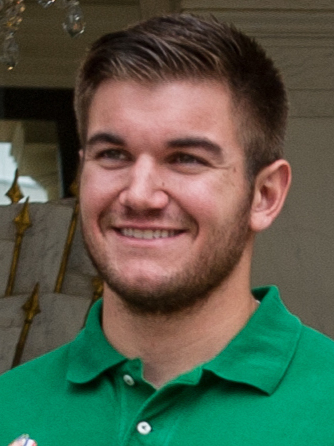
Nominee	Val Hoyle	Alek Skarlatos
Party	Democratic	Republican
Popular vote	171,372	146,055
Percentage	50.5%	43.1%
- County results Hoyle: 40–50% 50–60% 60–70% Skarlatos: 50–60% 60–70%
U.S. Representative before election
Peter DeFazio
Democratic
Elected U.S. Representative
Val Hoyle
Democratic

From 2012 to 2020, the 4th district included the southern Willamette Valley and the South Coast, including Eugene, Corvallis, and Roseburg. The district was kept largely the same despite redistricting, though it did gain parts of the central coast previously in the 5th district, making the district more Democratic leaning. The incumbent, Democrat Peter DeFazio, who was re-elected with 51.5% of the vote in 2020, decided to retire, rather than seek a 19th consecutive term in Congress.

=== Democratic primary ===
==== Candidates ====
===== Nominee =====
- Val Hoyle, Oregon Commissioner of Labor

===== Eliminated in primary =====
- Sami Al-Abdrabbuh, chair of the Corvallis School District Board
- Doyle Canning, environmental activist and candidate for this district in 2020
- Andrew Kalloch, Airbnb senior global policy advisor
- Steve Laible, author and publisher
- Jake Matthews, community organizer and author
- John Selker, professor and scientist
- G. Tommy Smith, personal banker

===== Withdrew =====
- Kevin Easton, political consultant and former executive director of Equity Foundation
- Joshua Welch, teacher

===== Declined =====
- Melissa Cribbins, Coos County commissioner
- Peter DeFazio, incumbent U.S. representative
- Julie Fahey, state representative from the 14th district (running for re-election)
- Sara Gelser Blouin, state senator from the 8th district (running for re-election)
- James Manning Jr., state senator from the 7th district (running for re-election)
- Dan Rayfield, Speaker of the Oregon House of Representatives from the 16th district (running for re-election)
- Marty Wilde, state representative from the 11th district

==== Endorsements ====
Doyle Canning

State officials

- Bill Bradbury, former Oregon Secretary of State (1999–2009), former president of the Oregon State Senate (1993–1994), former member of the Oregon State Senate (1985–1995), former member of the Oregon House of Representatives (1981–1985)

Organizations

- Progressive Democrats of America
Val Hoyle

Federal officials

- Peter DeFazio, U.S. representative from OR-04 (1987–present)
- Jeff Merkley, U.S. senator from Oregon (2009–present)
- Ron Wyden, U.S. senator from Oregon (1996–present)

Organizations

- Congressional Progressive Caucus PAC
- EMILY's List
- Giffords
- League of Conservation Voters Action Fund
- NARAL Pro-Choice America
- New Democrat Coalition Action Fund
- Oregon Education Association PAC
- Oregon Working Families Party
- Planned Parenthood Action Fund
- Sierra Club

Newspapers

- The Oregonian

Labor unions

- Service Employees International Union Oregon State Council
Andrew Kalloch

Organizations

- Forward Party
John Selker

Organizations

- 314 Action

==== Polling ====
Poll source	Date(s) administered	Sample size (Note: Key: A – all adults RV – registered voters LV – likely voters V – unclear)	Margin of error	Doyle Canning	Val Hoyle	Andrew Kalloch	Other	Undecided
Public Policy Polling (D) (Note: Poll sponsored by Climate Hawks Vote, which supports Canning)	March 17–18, 2022	634 (LV)	± 3.9%	8%	24%	4%	10%	54%

==== Results ====
Democratic primary results
Party	Candidate	Votes	%
Democratic	Val Hoyle	56,153	64.0
Democratic	Doyle Canning	14,245	16.2
Democratic	Sami Al-Abdrabbuh	6,080	6.9
Democratic	John Selker	4,738	5.4
Democratic	Andrew Kalloch	4,322	4.9
Democratic	G. Tommy Smith	1,278	1.5
Democratic	Jake Matthews	607	0.7
Democratic	Steve Laible	292	0.3
Total votes		87,715	100.0

=== Republican primary ===
==== Candidates ====
===== Nominee =====
- Alek Skarlatos, former Oregon National Guard soldier and nominee for this district in 2020

===== Withdrew =====
- Jeremy Van Tress

==== Results ====
Republican primary results
Party	Candidate	Votes	%
Republican	Alek Skarlatos	58,655	100.0
Total votes		58,655	100.0

=== General election ===
==== Debate ====
2022 Oregon's 4th congressional district debate
No.	Date	Host	Moderator	Link	Pacific Green	Constitution	Democratic	Independent	Republican
Key: P Participant A Absent N Not invited I Invited W Withdrawn									
Key: P Participant A Absent N Not invited I Invited W Withdrawn					Michael Beilstein	Jim Howard	Val Hoyle	Levi Leatherberry	Alek Skarlatos
1	October 6, 2022	City Club of Springfield; City Club of Eugene			P	P	P	N	P

==== Predictions ====
Source	Ranking	As of
The Cook Political Report	Lean D	August 5, 2022
Inside Elections	Tilt D	November 3, 2022
Sabato's Crystal Ball	Lean D	September 29, 2022
Politico	Lean D	October 3, 2022
RCP	Tossup	October 7, 2022
Fox News	Lean D	July 11, 2022
DDHQ	Tossup	October 16, 2022
538	Likely D	June 30, 2022
The Economist	Lean D	November 1, 2022

==== Polling ====
Poll source	Date(s) administered	Sample size	Margin of error	Val Hoyle (D)	Alex Skarlatos (R)	Undecided
Wick/RRH Elections (R)	October 23–26, 2022	529 (LV)	± 4%	45%	45%	10%
Moore Information Group (R) (Note: Poll sponsored jointly by the National Republican Congressional Committee and Skarlatos's campaign committee)	July 25–28, 2022	400 (LV)	± 5.0%	46%	41%	13%
RMG Research	June 4–6, 2022	500 (LV)	± 4.5%	46%	45%	9%

==== Results ====
2022 Oregon's 4th congressional district election
Party	Candidate	Votes	%
Democratic	Val Hoyle (Note: co-nominated by Working Families Party of Oregon)	171,372	50.5
Republican	Alek Skarlatos	146,055	43.1
Independent Party	Levi Leatherberry (Note: co-nominated by Libertarian Party of Oregon)	9,052	2.7
Constitution	Jim Howard	6,075	1.8
Pacific Green	Michael Beilstein (Note: co-nominated by Oregon Progressive Party)	6,033	1.8
Write-in		490	0.1
Total votes		339,077	100.0
Democratic hold			

==== By county ====
County	Val Hoyle Democratic		Alek Skarlatos Republican		Various candidates Other parties		Margin		Total
County	#	%	#	%	#	%	#	%	Total
Benton	28,067	62.51%	13,818	30.78%	3,014	6.71%	14,249	31.74%	44,899
Coos	10,761	34.69%	18,184	58.61%	2,079	6.70%	-7,423	-23.93%	31,024
Curry	4,566	36.52%	7,232	57.84%	706	5.65%	-2,666	-21.32%	12,504
Douglas (part)	11,560	27.47%	27,210	64.66%	3,314	7.87%	-15,650	-37.19%	42,084
Lane	102,200	56.13%	68,996	37.89%	10,891	5.98%	33,204	18.24%	182,087
Lincoln	13,872	53.80%	10,298	39.94%	1,614	6.26%	3,574	13.86%	25,784
Linn (part)	346	49.78%	317	45.61%	32	4.60%	29	4.17%	695
Totals	171,372	50.54%	146,055	43.07%	21,650	6.38%	25,317	7.47%	339,077

== District 5 ==
2022 Oregon's 5th congressional district election
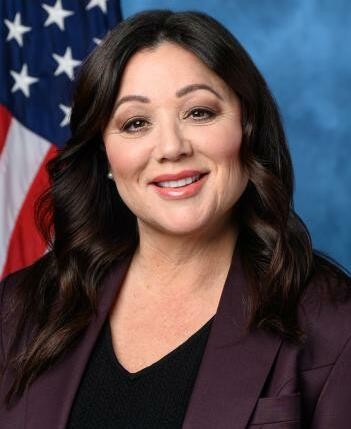

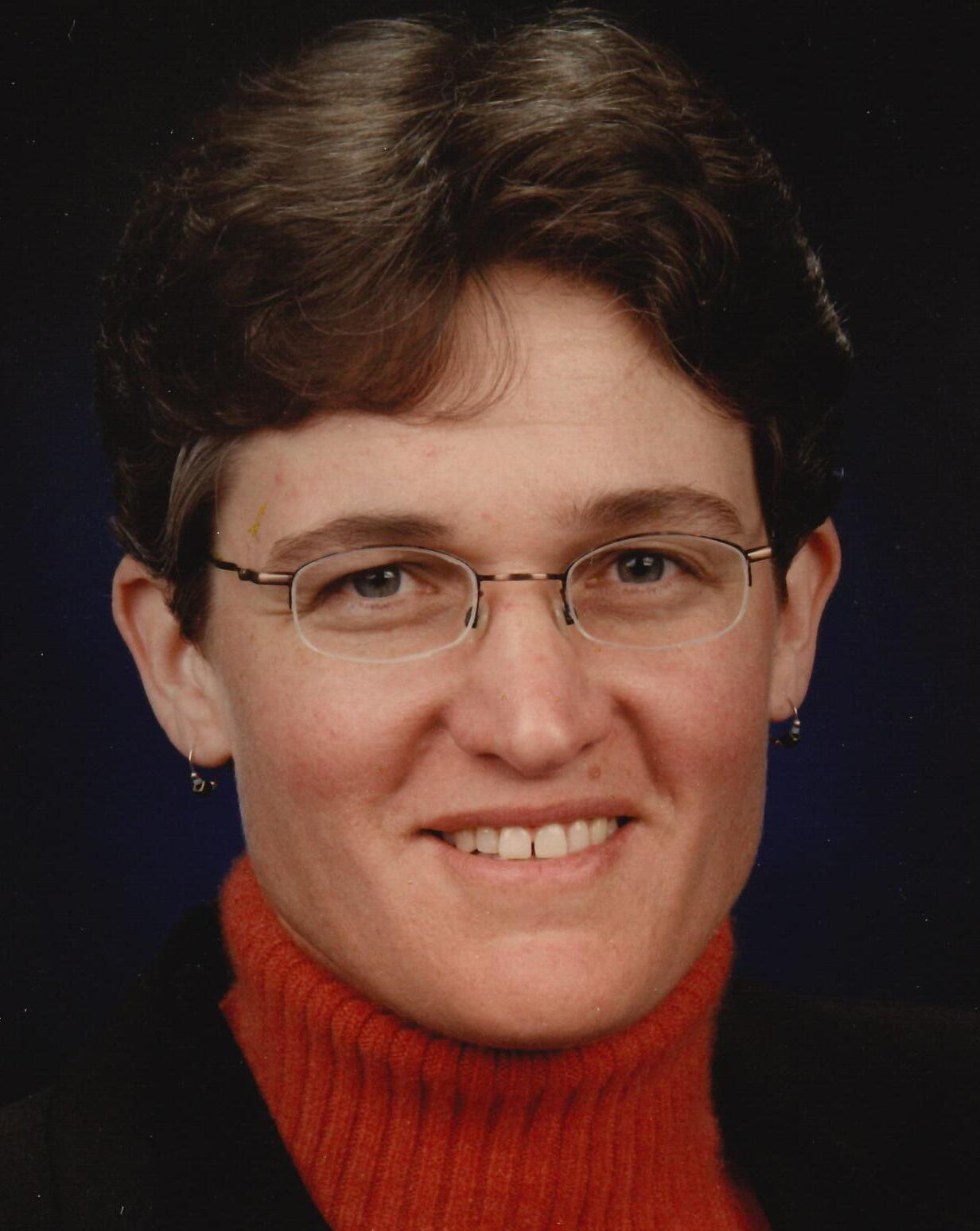
Nominee	Lori Chavez-DeRemer	Jamie McLeod-Skinner
Party	Republican	Democratic
Popular vote	178,813	171,514
Percentage	50.9%	48.8%
- County results Chavez-DeRemer: 60–70% McLeod-Skinner: 50–60% 70–80% >90%
U.S. Representative before election
Kurt Schrader
Democratic
Elected U.S. Representative
Lori Chavez-DeRemer
Republican

From 2012 to 2020, the 5th district straddled the central coast, and included Salem and the southern Portland suburbs. The new 5th district keeps the southern suburbs of Portland and reaches further into the city, but does not include any coastline, instead stretching southwards through the eastern parts of Marion and Linn counties to Bend.

The incumbent, Democrat Kurt Schrader, was re-elected with 51.9% of the vote in 2020. He lost renomination to Jamie McLeod-Skinner.

=== Democratic primary ===
==== Candidates ====
===== Nominee =====
- Jamie McLeod-Skinner, attorney, former Santa Clara, California city councillor, nominee for the 2nd district in 2018, and candidate for Oregon Secretary of State in 2020

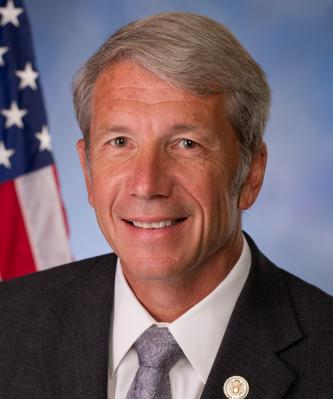
Incumbent Kurt Schrader from Canby

===== Eliminated in primary =====
- Kurt Schrader, incumbent U.S. representative

===== Withdrew =====
- Mark Gamba, mayor of Milwaukie (endorsed McLeod-Skinner)

==== Endorsements ====
Kurt Schrader

U.S. presidents

- Joe Biden, 46th president of the United States

Organizations

- Democratic Majority for Israel
- Humane Society of the United States Legislative Fund
- Planned Parenthood Action Fund
- Pro-Israel America

Labor unions

- American Federation of Government Employees
- International Brotherhood of Teamsters

Newspapers

- The Oregonian (primary only)

==== Polling ====
Poll source	Date(s) administered	Sample size	Margin of error	Jamie McLeod-Skinner	Kurt Schrader	Undecided
Patinkin Research Strategies (D) (Note: Poll sponsored by McLeod-Skinner's campaign)	January 31 – February 4, 2022	406 (LV)	± 4.9%	34%	37%	30%

==== Results ====
Democratic primary results by county: McLeod-Skinner: 50–60%; 70–80%; >90%; Schrader: 50–60%

Democratic primary results
Party	Candidate	Votes	%
Democratic	Jamie McLeod-Skinner	47,148	54.9
Democratic	Kurt Schrader (incumbent)	38,726	45.1
Total votes		85,874	100.0

=== Republican primary ===
==== Candidates ====
===== Nominee =====
- Lori Chavez-DeRemer, former mayor of Happy Valley

===== Eliminated in primary =====
- Jimmy Crumpacker, investor and candidate for Oregon's 2nd congressional district in 2020
- John Di Paola, orthopedic surgeon
- Madison Oatman, building restoration technician
- Laurel L. Roses, co-owner of a trucking company

===== Declined =====
- Knute Buehler, nominee for governor of Oregon in 2018
- Shelly Boshart Davis, state representative from the 15th district (running for re-election)
- Christine Drazan, former Minority Leader of the Oregon House of Representatives from the 39th district (running for governor)
- Cheri Helt, former state representative from the 54th district (running for labor commissioner) (Note: Presumably; currently running for Oregon Bureau of Labor and Industries.)
- Tim Knopp, Minority Leader of the Oregon State Senate from the 27th district
- Tootie Smith, Clackamas County commissioner

==== Endorsements ====
Lori Chavez-DeRemer

Organizations

- Maggie's List
Jimmy Crumpacker

Newspapers

- The Oregonian (primary only)

==== Results ====
Republican primary results by county: Chavez-DeRemer: 30–40%; 40–50%; No votes

Republican primary results
Party	Candidate	Votes	%
Republican	Lori Chavez-DeRemer	30,438	42.8
Republican	Jimmy Crumpacker	20,631	29.0
Republican	John Di Paola	11,486	16.1
Republican	Laurel L. Roses	6,321	8.9
Republican	Madison Oatman	1,863	2.6
Republican	Write-in	429	0.6
Total votes		71,168	100.0

=== General election ===
==== Debates & forum ====
2022 Oregon's 5th congressional district debates & candidate forum
No.	Date	Host	Moderator	Link	Democratic	Republican
Key: P Participant A Absent N Not invited I Invited W Withdrawn						
Key: P Participant A Absent N Not invited I Invited W Withdrawn					Jamie McLeod-Skinner	Lori Chavez-DeRemer
1	Sep. 27, 2022	KATU	Deb Knapp	KATU	P	P
2	Oct. 3, 2022	KTVZ	Lee Anderson	YouTube (Part 1); YouTube (Part 2); YouTube (Part 3)	P	P
3	Oct. 17, 2022	League of Women Voters of Clackamas County; League of Women Voters of Portland	Linda Mather	YouTube	P	P

==== Predictions ====
Source	Ranking	As of
The Cook Political Report	Lean R (flip)	November 1, 2022
Inside Elections	Tilt R (flip)	November 3, 2022
Sabato's Crystal Ball	Lean R (flip)	October 26, 2022
Politico	Lean R (flip)	October 26, 2022
RCP	Lean R (flip)	October 30, 2022
Fox News	Lean R (flip)	November 1, 2022
DDHQ	Tossup	July 20, 2022
538	Tossup	November 8, 2022
The Economist	Tossup	November 1, 2022

==== Endorsements ====
Jamie McLeod-Skinner (D)

State officials

- Kayse Jama, Oregon state senator from District 24
- Barbara Roberts, former governor of Oregon

Local officials

- Mark Gamba, mayor of Milwaukie (2015–present)

Labor unions

- American Federation of Teachers Oregon
- International Longshore and Warehouse Union
- Oregon Education Association
- Oregon Federation of Nurses and Health Professionals
- Oregon Nurses Association
- Service Employees International Union Oregon State Council
- United Food and Commercial Workers Local 555 (UFCW 555)

Organizations

- Clackamas County Democratic Party
- Democracy for America
- Deschutes County Democratic Party
- Emily's List
- Human Rights Campaign PAC
- Indivisible
- League of Conservation Voters
- LGBTQ Victory Fund
- Linn County Democratic Party
- Marion County Democratic Party
- NARAL Pro-Choice America
- Oregon Working Families Party
- Progressive Change Campaign Committee
- Progressive Democrats of America
- Sierra Club
- Sunrise Movement Eugene
- Sunrise Movement Portland
- Sunrise Movement Rural Oregon
- Working Families Party

Newspapers

- The Bend Bulletin
- Willamette Week
Lori Chavez-DeRemer (R)

Federal officials

- Elise Stefanik, U.S. representative from New York's 21st congressional district

Organizations

- Elevate PAC
- Maggie's List

Newspapers

- The Bend Bulletin

==== Polling ====
Poll source	Date(s) administered	Sample size	Margin of error	Jamie McLeod-Skinner (D)	Lori Chavez-DeRemer (R)	Undecided
Global Strategy Group (D) (Note: Poll sponsored by 314 Action, which supports McLeod-Skinner)	September 1–8, 2022	400 (LV)	± 4.9%	41%	38%	21%
Clout Research (R) (Note: Poll sponsored by the National Republican Congressional Committee)	August 15–18, 2022	410 (V)	± 4.8%	34%	44%	22%
Public Policy Polling (D)	June 1–2, 2022	572 (V)	± 4.1%	41%	42%	17%

Hypothetical polling

Generic Democrat vs. generic Republican

Poll source	Date(s) administered	Sample size	Margin of error	Generic Democrat	Generic Republican	Undecided
Global Strategy Group (D)	September 1–8, 2022	400 (LV)	± 4.9%	41%	42%	17%
Public Policy Polling (D)	June 1–2, 2022	572 (V)	± 4.1%	42%	45%	13%

==== Results ====
2022 Oregon's 5th congressional district election
Party	Candidate	Votes	%
Republican	Lori Chavez-DeRemer	178,813	50.9
Democratic	Jamie McLeod-Skinner	171,514	48.8
Write-in		906	0.3
Total votes		351,233	100.0
Republican gain from Democratic			

==== By county ====
County	Jamie McLeod-Skinner Democratic		Lori Chavez-DeRemer Republican		Write-in Various		Margin		Total
County	#	%	#	%	#	%	#	%	Total
Clackamas (part)	74,957	50.68%	72,529	49.03%	429	0.29%	-2,428	-1.64%	147,915
Deschutes (part)	49,112	52.73%	43,857	47.09%	174	0.19%	-5,255	-5.64%	93,143
Jefferson (part)	3	100.00%	0	0.00%	0	0.00%	-3	-100.00%	3
Linn (part)	19,088	32.24%	39,918	67.42%	199	0.34%	20,830	35.18%	59,205
Marion (part)	7,845	31.10%	17,318	68.65%	62	0.25%	9,473	37.55%	25,225
Multnomah (part)	20,509	79.67%	5,191	20.17%	42	0.16%	-15,318	-59.51%	25,742
Totals	171,514	48.83%	178,813	50.91%	906	0.26%	7,299	2.08%	351,233

== District 6 ==
2022 Oregon's 6th congressional district election
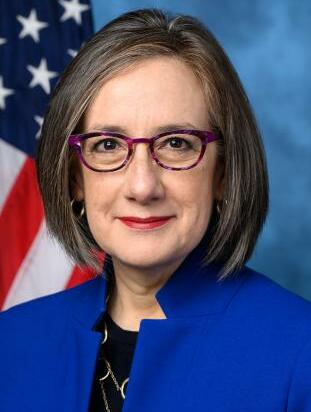

Nominee	Andrea Salinas	Mike Erickson
Party	Democratic	Republican
Popular vote	147,156	139,946
Percentage	50.0%	47.5%
- County results Salinas: 50–60% 60–70% Erickson: 50–60%
U.S. Representative before election
Vacant
(New district)
Elected U.S. Representative
Andrea Salinas
Democratic

The 6th district was created following the 2020 census. It consists of Polk County and Yamhill County, in addition to portions of Marion County (including the state capital, Salem), Clackamas County, and Washington County.

=== Democratic primary ===
==== Candidates ====
===== Nominee =====
- Andrea Salinas, state representative from the 38th district

===== Eliminated in primary =====
- Teresa Alonso Leon, state representative from the 22nd district
- Ricky Barajas, perennial candidate
- Carrick Flynn, former Oxford researcher on pandemic preparedness
- Greg Goodwin
- Kathleen Harder, chair of the Oregon Medical Board
- Cody Reynolds, businessman and veteran
- Loretta Smith, former Multnomah County commissioner
- Matt West, engineer at Intel

===== Withdrew =====
- Brian Hylland Jr.
- Derry Jackson, former Portland Public Schools board member

===== Declined =====
- Brian Clem, former state representative from the 21st district
- Paul Evans, state representative from the 20th district and former mayor of Monmouth (running for re-election)

==== Endorsements ====
Teresa Alonso Leon

Labor unions

- American Federation of Teachers-Oregon

Organizations

- Portland for Bernie
Andrea Salinas

U.S. senators

- Elizabeth Warren, U.S. senators from Massachusetts (2013–present)

U.S. governors

- Kate Brown, Governor of Oregon (2015–present)

U.S. House representatives

- Pramila Jayapal, U.S. representative from Washington's 7th congressional district (2017–present)

Organizations

- BOLD PAC
- Giffords
- League of Conservation Voters
- NARAL Pro-Choice America
- Oregon Working Families Party
- Planned Parenthood Action Fund
- Sierra Club

Labor Unions

- Oregon Education Association PAC
- Service Employees International Union

Newspapers

- The Oregonian (primary only)
- Willamette Week

==== Polling ====
Poll source	Date(s) administered	Sample size	Margin of error	Teresa Alonso Leon	Carrick Flynn	Kathleen Harder	Cody Reynolds	Andrea Salinas	Loretta Smith	Matt West	Undecided
Public Policy Polling (D) (Note: Poll sponsored by Salinas's campaign)	May 2–3, 2022	591 (LV)	± 4.0%	≤9%	14%	≤9%	≤9%	18%	≤9%	≤9%	≥23%

==== Results ====
Democratic primary results
Party	Candidate	Votes	%
Democratic	Andrea Salinas	26,101	37.0
Democratic	Carrick Flynn	13,052	18.5
Democratic	Cody Reynolds	7,951	11.3
Democratic	Loretta Smith	7,064	10.0
Democratic	Matt West	5,658	8.0
Democratic	Kathleen Harder	5,510	7.8
Democratic	Teresa Alonso Leon	4,626	6.6
Democratic	Ricky Barajas	292	0.4
Democratic	Greg Goodwin	217	0.3
Total votes		70,471	100.0

=== Republican primary ===
==== Candidates ====
===== Nominee =====
- Mike Erickson, consultant and nominee for Oregon's 5th congressional district in 2006 and 2008

===== Eliminated in primary =====
- Jim Bunn, former U.S. representative for Oregon's 5th congressional district
- Amy Ryan Courser, former Keizer city councilor and nominee for Oregon's 5th congressional district in 2020
- Ron Noble, state representative from the 24th district
- Angela Plowhead, clinical psychologist
- David Russ, mayor of Dundee
- Nate Sandvig, U.S. Military Academy graduate

===== Declined =====
- Tootie Smith, Clackamas County commissioner

==== Endorsements ====
Ron Noble

Newspapers

- The Oregonian (primary only)

==== Results ====
Republican primary results
Party	Candidate	Votes	%
Republican	Mike Erickson	21,675	34.9
Republican	Ron Noble	10,980	17.7
Republican	Amy Ryan Courser	10,176	16.4
Republican	Angela Plowhead	8,271	13.3
Republican	Jim Bunn	6,340	10.2
Republican	David Russ	2,398	3.9
Republican	Nate Sandvig	2,222	3.6
Total votes		62,062	100.0

=== General election ===
==== Predictions ====
Source	Ranking	As of
The Cook Political Report	Tossup	October 11, 2022
Inside Elections	Tossup	October 21, 2022
Sabato's Crystal Ball	Lean D (flip)	September 29, 2022
Politico	Tossup	October 18, 2022
RCP	Tossup	October 16, 2022
Fox News	Tossup	October 18, 2022
DDHQ	Tossup	November 8, 2022
538	Lean D (flip)	November 4, 2022
The Economist	Lean D (flip)	October 4, 2022

==== Post-primary endorsements ====
Mike Erickson (R)

Organizations

- National Federation of Independent Business
- Republican Jewish Coalition
- United States Chamber of Commerce

==== Polling ====
Aggregate polls

Source of poll aggregation	Dates administered	Dates updated	Andrea Salinas (D)	Mike Erickson (R)	Undecided (Note: Calculated by taking the difference of 100% and all other candidates combined.)	Margin
FiveThirtyEight	July 28 – October 5, 2022	October 10, 2022	40.6%	44.3%	15.1%	Erickson +3.7

Graphical summary

Poll source	Date(s) administered	Sample size	Margin of error	Andrea Salinas (D)	Mike Erickson (R)	Other	Undecided
GBAO (D) (Note: Poll sponsored by the Salinas campaign)	October 3–5, 2022	500 (LV)	± 4.4%	45%	44%	2% (Note: McFarland with 2%)	9%
Cygnal (R) (Note: Poll sponsored by Erickson's campaign)	September 29–30, 2022	400 (LV)	± 4.8%	39%	44%	–	17%
Clout Research (R)	August 14–19, 2022	409 (V)	± 4.4%	34%	43%	–	23%
GBAO (D)	August 10–14, 2022	500 (LV)	± 4.4%	48%	45%	–	7%
Cygnal (R) (Note: Poll sponsored jointly by the National Republican Congressional Committee and Erickson's campaign committee)	July 26–28, 2022	400 (LV)	± 4.9%	40%	47%	–	13%
RMG Research	June 4–9, 2022	500 (LV)	± 4.5%	46%	43%	–	11%

Hypothetical polling

Generic Democrat vs. generic Republican

Poll source	Date(s) administered	Sample size	Margin of error	Generic Democrat	Generic Republican	Undecided
Change Research (D) (Note: Poll sponsored by the House Majority PAC)	October 19, 2022	–	–	42%	41%	17%
GBAO (D)	October 3–5, 2022	500 (LV)	± 4.4%	44%	48%	8%

==== Results ====
2022 Oregon's 6th congressional district election
Party	Candidate	Votes	%
Democratic	Andrea Salinas	147,156	50.0
Republican	Mike Erickson	139,946	47.5
Constitution	Larry McFarland	6,762	2.3
Write-in		513	0.2
Total votes		294,377	100.0
Democratic win (new seat)			

==== By county ====
County	Andrea Salinas Democratic		Mike Erickson Republican		Various candidates Other parties		Margin		Total
County	#	%	#	%	#	%	#	%	Total
Clackamas (part)	10,678	54.84%	8,507	43.69%	286	1.47%	2,171	11.15%	19,471
Marion (part)	48,274	46.21%	53,018	50.75%	3,175	3.04%	-4,744	-4.54%	104,467
Polk	17,583	43.35%	21,906	54.00%	1,074	2.65%	-4,323	-10.66%	40,563
Washington (part)	50,086	61.55%	29,904	36.75%	1,389	1.71%	20,182	24.80%	81,379
Yamhill	20,535	42.34%	26,611	54.87%	1,351	2.79%	-6,076	-12.53%	48,497
Totals	147,156	49.99%	139,946	47.54%	7,275	2.47%	7,210	2.45%	294,377

== Notes ==
Partisan clients
