= Jamie McLeod-Skinner =

American attorney (born 1967)

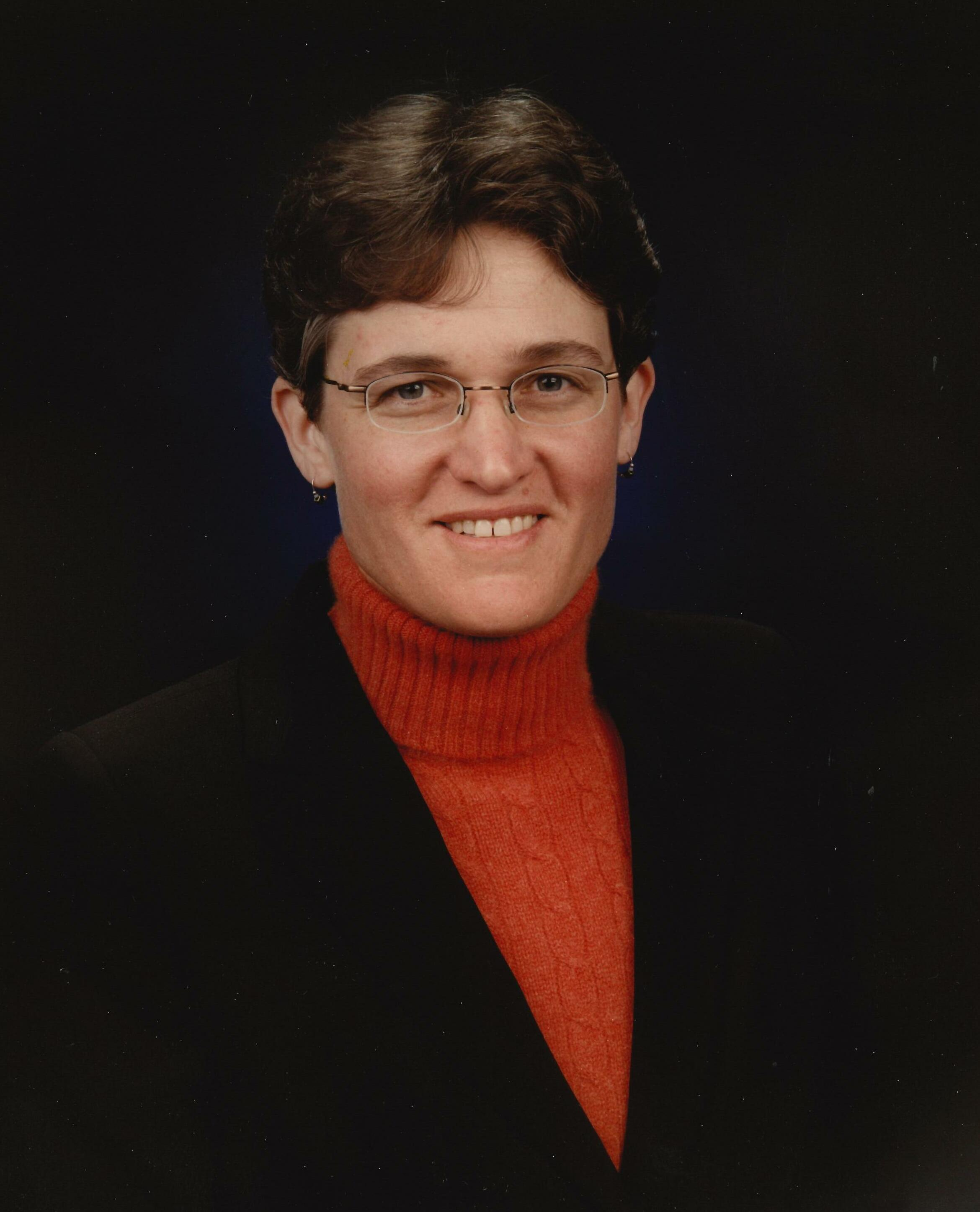

Member of the Santa Clara City Council, Seat 7
- In office January 1, 2005 – December 31, 2012
- Preceded by: John McLemore
- Succeeded by: Teresa O'Neill

Personal details
- Born: May 31, 1967 (age 59) Milwaukee, Wisconsin, U.S.
- Party: Democratic
- Spouse: Cass McLeod-Skinner
- Education: Rensselaer Polytechnic Institute (BS); Cornell University (MRP); University of Oregon (JD)
- Website: Campaign website

Jamie McLeod-Skinner (born May 31, 1967) is an American attorney, engineer, and politician who has run for office in Oregon on multiple occasions. She was the Democratic nominee for Oregon's 5th congressional district in the 2022 election. In an upset, McLeod-Skinner defeated seven-term incumbent Blue Dog representative Kurt Schrader in the Democratic primary for Oregon's 5th, in a race in which she was considered the more progressive candidate. She narrowly lost the general election to Republican former Happy Valley Mayor Lori Chavez-DeRemer. She sought a rematch with Chavez-DeRemer in 2024 but lost in the Democratic primary to Janelle Bynum.

== Early life and education ==
McLeod-Skinner was born in Milwaukee, Wisconsin. When she was nine, her mother, Marty Hall, moved to teach school in Tanzania. She attended elementary and high school there and in Kenya. She moved in 1983 to Ashland, Oregon. She graduated from Ashland High School in 1985, where she still holds the girls' 800-meter track record. She went to college at Rensselaer Polytechnic Institute, graduating in 1989 with a Bachelor of Science degree. She received a master's degree in urban and regional planning from Cornell University in 1995. She graduated from the University of Oregon School of Law in 2016 with a Juris Doctor.

== Career ==
Beginning at the end of 1995, she served as a reconstruction and program manager in war-torn Bosnia and Kosovo. She led a Lutheran services organization from 2000 through 2002.

From 2016 to 2017, McLeod-Skinner was the city manager of Phoenix, Oregon, where she was fired after four months by Mayor Chris Luz, supposedly due to complaints from several department heads, though she stated that the decision was politically motivated. Ultimately, the city councilors were split. She went on to work as the interim city manager of Talent, Oregon, in 2020, hired after the Almeda wildfire destroyed over 700 homes, more than one-third of the city, and where there was substantial discord between the executive, administration, and city employees.

== Political career ==
She served on the city council of Santa Clara, California, for eight years, from 2004 to 2012. In 2018, she ran in the Democratic primary for Oregon's 2nd congressional district, winning by 19.5% in a seven-candidate field. The district had been held by Republicans since 1981 and had only twice been represented by Democrats in its 121-year history. In the general election, she faced nine-term incumbent Greg Walden, a former state senator. She decided to run due to Walden's efforts to replace the Affordable Care Act. No Democrat had come within 36 percentage points of Walden since 2000. McLeod-Skinner lost by less than 17%. A political scientist took note of her run, as she had defeated Walden in Deschutes County though no candidate had come close before, with Carol Voisin outdoing all others, yet losing by almost 17,000 votes in 2006.

In 2020, she ran in the Secretary of State primary against two incumbent Democratic state senators, Shemia Fagan and Mark Hass. She focused her campaign on preserving and expanding voter rights and accessibility and did not accept corporate contributions. In the Democratic primary, the three candidates were separated by less than nine percentage points, with Fagan winning the election.

In 2022, McLeod-Skinner challenged moderate Democrat Kurt Schrader, a six-term incumbent whose district boundaries were substantially reordered by redistricting, as Oregon gained a sixth seat due to its population increase. Schrader had opposed some initiatives by President Biden, who nevertheless endorsed him, but the incumbent had alienated grassroots leadership in a number of counties. The new district took in Deschutes County and also included part of Multnomah County, a reliable progressive stronghold. She won both counties by double digits. Democratic Party leadership organizations in four of the five counties within the district's new boundaries supported McLeod-Skinner, who was also endorsed by Senator Elizabeth Warren. Schrader received 2022 endorsements from President Joe Biden and House Speaker Nancy Pelosi, and his campaign outspent McLeod-Skinner's by 10–1. Although he first referred to Trump's impeachment as a "lynching", he later voted for it. McLeod-Skinner's win marked the first time an incumbent member of Oregon's congressional delegation had lost a primary in 42 years. The primary divided the party, and Schrader refused to endorse her in the general election. McLeod-Skinner narrowly lost the general election to Lori Chavez-DeRemer. In 2023, she announced she would seek a rematch with Chavez-DeRemer.

The rematch with Chavez-DeRemer was derailed on May 21, 2024, when McLeod-Skinner lost in the primary to State Representative Janelle Bynum by a 40-percent margin.. In the lead up to the primary, multiple local newspapers reported McLeod-Skinner's verbal and emotional abuse of former campaign staffers, none of whom went on the record out of fear of retaliation.. One staffer reported fearing that McLeod-Skinner would hit him. The campaign would later arrange for no contact between the staffer and McLeod-Skinner.

== Electoral history ==
=== 2022 ===
2022 U.S. House Democratic primary in Oregon's 5th district
Party	Candidate	Votes	%
Democratic	Jamie McLeod-Skinner	47,148	54.9
Democratic	Kurt Schrader (incumbent)	38,726	45.1
Total votes		85,874	100.0

2022 U.S. House Election in Oregon's 5th district
Party	Candidate	Votes	%
Republican	Lori Chavez-DeRemer	178,813	50.91
Democratic	Jamie McLeod-Skinner	171,514	48.83
Write-in		906	0.26
Total votes		351,233	100.0

=== 2020 ===
2020 Oregon Secretary of State Democratic primary
Party	Candidate	Votes	%
Democratic	Shemia Fagan	209,682	36.23%
Democratic	Mark Hass	205,230	35.46%
Democratic	Jamie McLeod-Skinner	159,430	27.55%
Democratic	Write-ins	4,395	0.76%
Total votes		578,737	100.0%

=== 2018 ===
2018 U.S. House Democratic primary in Oregon's 2nd district
Party	Candidate	Votes	%
Democratic	Jamie McLeod-Skinner	25,351	42.8
Democratic	Jennifer Neahring	14,020	23.7
Democratic	James Crary	6,774	11.4
Democratic	Tim S. White	3,469	5.9
Democratic	Raz Mason	3,137	5.3
Democratic	Eric Burnette	2,734	4.6
Democratic	Michael Byrne	2,546	4.3
Democratic	Write-ins	1,173	2.0
Total votes		59,204	100.0

2018 U.S. House Election in Oregon's 2nd district
Party	Candidate	Votes	%	±%
Republican	Greg Walden (incumbent)	207,597	56.3	−15.4
Democratic	Jamie McLeod-Skinner	145,298	39.4	+11.4
Independent Party	Mark Roberts	15,536	4.2	N/A
n/a	Write-ins	278	0.1	−0.2
Total votes		368,709	100.0	N/A
Republican hold				

=== 2008 ===
2008 Santa Clara City Council election, Seat 7
Party	Candidate	Votes	%
Nonpartisan	Jamie McLeod	18,278	59.53%
Nonpartisan	Chuck Blair	8,283	26.98%
Nonpartisan	Ciaran Gerard O'Donnell	4,141	13.49%
Total votes		27,246	100.00%

=== 2004 ===
2004 Santa Clara City Council election, Seat 7
Party	Candidate	Votes	%
Nonpartisan	Jamie McLeod	14,331	52.60%
Nonpartisan	Charles "Chuck" Blair, Jr.	9,257	33.98%
Nonpartisan	Todd C. O'Donnell	3,658	13.43%
Total votes		27,246	100.00%
