= Lori Chavez-DeRemer =

American politician (born 1968)

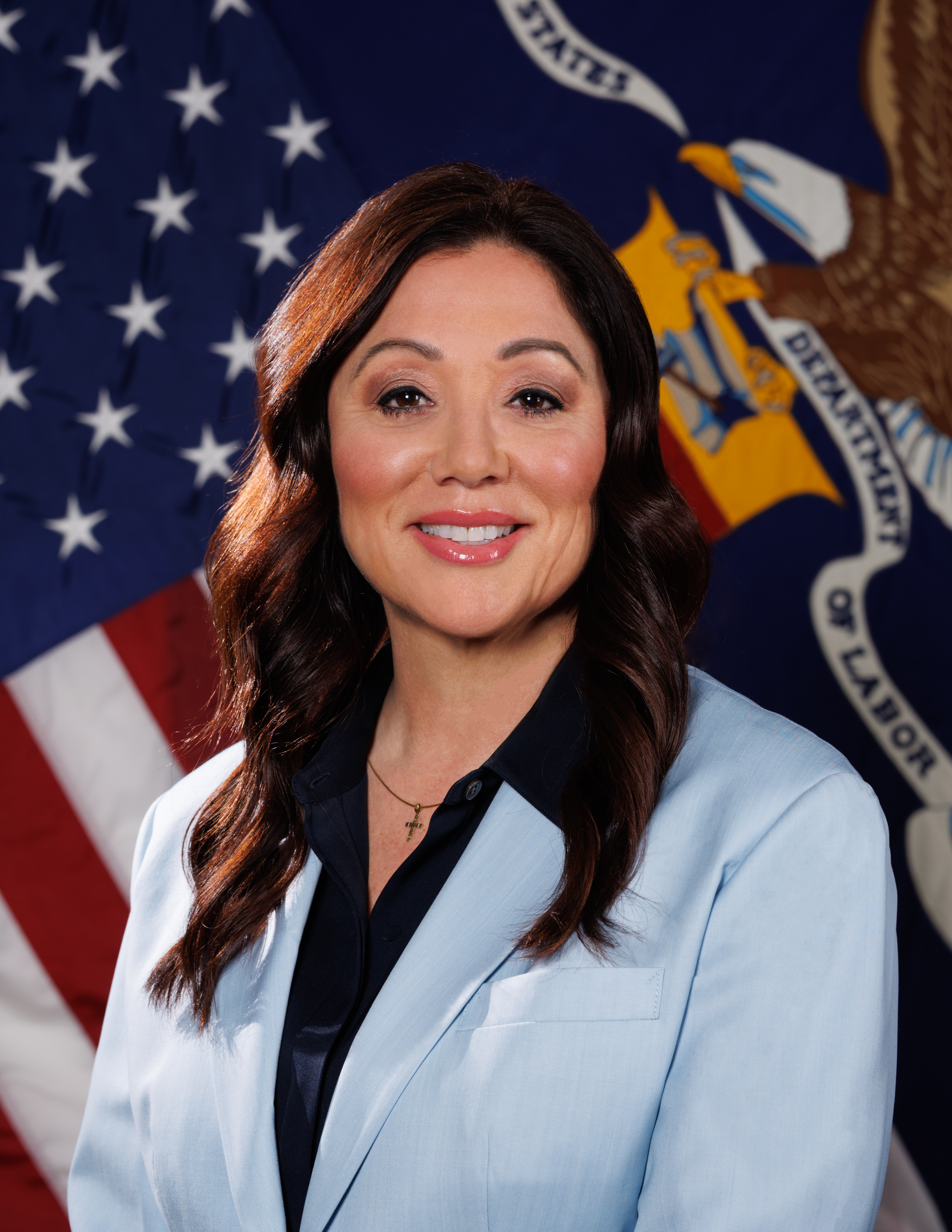
- Official portrait, 2025

30th United States Secretary of Labor
- In office March 11, 2025 – April 20, 2026
- President: Donald Trump
- Deputy: Keith Sonderling
- Preceded by: Marty Walsh
- Succeeded by: Keith Sonderling

Member of the U.S. House of Representatives from Oregon's 5th district
- In office January 3, 2023 – January 3, 2025
- Preceded by: Kurt Schrader
- Succeeded by: Janelle Bynum

Mayor of Happy Valley
- In office January 18, 2011 – January 15, 2019
- Preceded by: Rob Wheeler
- Succeeded by: Tom Ellis

Personal details
- Born: Lori Michelle Chavez; April 7, 1968 (age 58) Santa Clara, California, U.S.
- Party: Republican
- Spouse: Shawn DeRemer (m. 1991)
- Children: 2
- Education: California State University, Fresno (BBA)

Lori Michelle Chavez-DeRemer (/ˈtʃɑːvɛz dəˈriːmər/; née Chavez; born April 7, 1968) is an American politician and businesswoman who served as the United States secretary of labor from 2025 until her resignation in 2026. A member of the Republican Party, Chavez-DeRemer served as the U.S. representative for Oregon's fifth congressional district from 2023 to 2025 and as the mayor of Happy Valley, Oregon, from 2011 to 2019.

Chavez-DeRemer graduated from California State University, Fresno, with a Bachelor of Business Administration in 1990. She worked various jobs before being elected to the Happy Valley City Council in 2004. Chavez-DeRemer was elected mayor of Happy Valley in 2010. She was reelected in 2014. Chavez-DeRemer ran in the 2016 Oregon House of Representatives election for the state's 51st district, losing to the Democratic nominee, Janelle Bynum. She lost to Bynum again in the 2018 election for the district.

Chavez-DeRemer ran in the 2022 United States House of Representatives election for Oregon's fifth congressional district. She won the Republican primary in May and defeated the Democratic nominee, Jamie McLeod-Skinner, in November. Chavez-DeRemer became the first Republican woman and one of the first Latinas, alongside Andrea Salinas, to represent Oregon in the United States Congress. She lost to Bynum in the 2024 election for the district.

In November 2024, President-elect Donald Trump named Chavez-DeRemer as his nominee for the secretary of labor. The Senate voted to confirm her in March, and she was sworn in that month. Amid investigations into alleged misconduct by her and her husband, Chavez-DeRemer resigned in April 2026.

== Early life and education (1968–1990) ==
Lori Michelle Chavez was born on April 7, 1968, in Santa Clara, California. She is Hispanic. Her father was a member of the International Brotherhood of Teamsters, a union. Chavez was raised in Hanford, California. She graduated from Hanford High School in 1986. Chavez was on Hanford's cheerleading team. She worked as a peach packer and a cashier to afford the team uniform. Chavez received a Bachelor of Business Administration from California State University, Fresno, in 1990, becoming the first person in her family to graduate from college. Chavez is Catholic.

== Career ==
=== Early work and mayor of Happy Valley (1989–2019) ===
From January 1989 to May 1990, DeRemer worked as a receptionist at a Planned Parenthood facility in California. By November, she was employed as a medical consultant. That month, she was engaged to Shawn DeRemer; they married in May 1991 and had two children. They attended medical school at the same time, but Chavez-DeRemer withdrew to support DeRemer. She worked various jobs, including cooking, babysitting, and teaching mathematics.

Chavez-DeRemer and DeRemer moved to Happy Valley, Oregon, in 2000. Chavez-DeRemer joined the Happy Valley Parks Committee in 2002. She was elected to the Happy Valley City Council in 2004, later serving as the city council's president. In 2010, Chavez-DeRemer was elected mayor of Happy Valley, becoming the first woman and the first Latina to serve as the city's mayor. She was re-elected in 2014, serving for another four years. Chavez-DeRemer worked as a business consultant for Evolve Health from 2019 until her election to the United States House of Representatives in 2022.

=== Oregon campaigns (2016–2018) ===
On January 27, 2016, Chavez-DeRemer announced that she would run in that year's Oregon House of Representatives election for the state's 51st district as a Republican. She was endorsed by the Happy Valley city council and Clackamas County's commissioner, Martha Schrader, a Democrat. Shemia Fagan, a Democrat who had occupied the seat since 2012, ended her reelection campaign in March, citing family commitments; according to The Oregonian, Fagan had been in "tough race" against Chavez-DeRemer. The Democratic nominee, Janelle Bynum, defeated Chavez-DeRemer in the general election on November 8. It was the most expensive election in the history of the Oregon House of Representatives.

In June 2017, Chavez-DeRemer established a political action committee to examine a possible campaign in the 2018 Oregon gubernatorial election. In October, she declined to run in the election and instead ran for the 2018 Oregon House of Representatives election for the state's 51st district against Bynum. As Bynum operated McDonald's franchises and installed automated kiosks, Chavez-DeRemer's campaign focused on labor and automation. Bynum defeated Chavez-DeRemer in the general election on November 6. In January 2021, Chavez-DeRemer and her husband refinanced their home in Oregon and bought a home in Fountain Hills, Arizona, with the intent to retire there. They moved back to Oregon while DeRemer pursued residency in Arizona.

== U.S. House of Representatives (2023–2025) ==
=== Initial campaign ===
By November 2021, Chavez-DeRemer had declared her candidacy in the 2022 United States House of Representatives election for Oregon's fifth congressional district; at the time, she lived in Happy Valley, in Oregon's third congressional district. By March 2022, Chavez-DeRemer and the investor Jimmy Crumpacker had raised significantly more funds than their opponents in the Republican primary. Chavez-DeRemer won the primary on May 17.

According to The Oregonian, the general election was the state's most competitive election and one of the most competitive in the country that year; FiveThirtyEight deemed it one of ten that would decide the composition of the 118th United States Congress. Chavez-DeRemer's campaign focused on the global energy crisis, the inflation surge, and rising crime. Chavez-DeRemer defeated the Democratic nominee, Jamie McLeod-Skinner, in the general election on November 8. Her victory was the first for a Republican in Oregon's fifth congressional district since 1994. She became the first Republican woman and one of the first Latinas, alongside Andrea Salinas, to represent Oregon in Congress.

=== Tenure and reelection campaign ===
Chavez-DeRemer was sworn in on January 7, 2023, after the Speaker of the House of Representatives election delayed the swearing-in of new members. She was involved in discussions on a successor bill to the Agriculture Improvement Act, advocating for the accessibility of crop insurance and child care. Chavez-DeRemer introduced 24 bills into Congress. Two of them, expanding healthcare services to veterans and supporting poison control and overdose prevention programs, were signed into law.

By April 2023, Chavez-DeRemer had begun fundraising for the 2024 United States House of Representatives election for Oregon's fifth congressional district. The Democratic Congressional Campaign Committee sought to oust her as early as July. By that month, she had raised $1.4 million for her campaign. In January 2024, a former caseworker in Chavez-DeRemer's office filed a federal employment-discrimination lawsuit, claiming that she was discriminated against for having a disability. The lawsuit was dismissed in March 2025 after a settlement, the amount of which was believed to be about $98,000.

The election for Oregon's fifth congressional district was again the state's most competitive. Chavez-DeRemer ran unopposed in the Republican primary. She debated the Democratic nominee, Janelle Bynum, on abortion, crime, and citizen engagement in October. In an effort to attract moderate voters, Chavez-DeRemer's campaign focused on anti-crime messaging. She connected Bynum to progressive policies, which she attributed to higher crime, overdoses, and homelessness. The election was seen as one of several that would determine the composition of the 119th Congress. Bynum defeated Chavez-DeRemer in the general election on November 5.

=== Committee assignments and caucuses ===
In January 2023, Chavez-DeRemer was assigned to the House Committee on Agriculture. She additionally served on the House Committees on Education and Workforce and on Transportation and Infrastructure. In April, Chavez-DeRemer and Florida representative Jared Moskowitz founded the Congressional Sneaker Caucus to "use sneakers to promote social interaction". In August, Politico reported that Chavez-DeRemer was interested in taking Utah representative Chris Stewart's seat on the House Committee on Appropriations after his expected resignation.

== Secretary of Labor (2025–2026) ==
=== Nomination and confirmation ===
Chavez-DeRemer testifying before the Senate Committee on Health, Education, Labor and Pensions in February 2025

In November 2024, after Donald Trump won the 2024 presidential election, Politico reported that International Brotherhood of Teamsters president Sean O'Brien had encouraged Trump to nominate Chavez-DeRemer for secretary of labor. On November 22, Trump announced that he would do so. Her nomination represented a break from the Republican Party's traditional antagonism toward unions. Chavez-DeRemer was praised by some Democrats for supporting the Protecting the Right to Organize Act; conversely, her support of the bill was criticized by Kentucky Senator Rand Paul, and Alabama Senator Tommy Tuberville called her someone who "checks all the boxes for the left". Several businesses proposed business-friendly nominees to Trump's presidential transition team, believing that it would limit Chavez-DeRemer's authority. According to The New York Times, Chavez-DeRemer told officials that she would govern as a figurehead.

Chavez-DeRemer appeared before the Senate Committee on Health, Education, Labor and Pensions on February 19, 2025. She faced questions about her support of the bill and the actions of Elon Musk, whose Department of Government Efficiency (DOGE) initiative had resulted in mass layoffs across the federal government. Chavez-DeRemer said she would support Trump's labor policies; that she did not believe Trump would ask her to violate the law in the service of Musk's efforts; and did not provide an answer on increasing the federal minimum wage, asserting that it was Congress's authority to determine the wage. She called the Protecting the Right to Organize Act an "imperfect bill", dismaying Vermont senator Bernie Sanders, who initially appeared open to her nomination. The committee voted to advance her nomination on February 27 in a 14–9 vote largely along party lines; Paul voted against her nomination, while Democratic senators Tim Kaine of Virginia, Maggie Hassan of New Hampshire, and John Hickenlooper of Colorado voted in favor. Chavez-DeRemer was confirmed by the Senate in a 67–32 vote on March 10.

=== Initial tenure ===
Chavez-DeRemer was sworn in on March 11, 2025. Her tenure coincided with DOGE's efforts to fire employees and dismantle programs. She announced the America at Work tour, a campaign to promote Trump's labor policy across the country, beginning in Scranton, Pennsylvania; she completed her tour of 48 states in March 2026. The tour occupied much of Chavez-DeRemer's time as the secretary of labor. Chavez-DeRemer faced questions about a celebration at the Department of Labor's building that was ostensibly a birthday party for her, including photographs of herself and a rendition of "Happy Birthday to You". She told the House Committee on Appropriations that it was not a birthday party. In April, her chief of staff, Jihun Han, sent a memorandum to employees saying that employees who spoke with journalists would face "serious legal consequences".

In May 2025, Chavez-DeRemer moved to rescind guidance from the Biden administration warning fiduciaries of including cryptocurrencies in 401(k) investments. She worked against DOGE on lease cancellations it requested through the General Services Administration and moved to end the Job Corps program.

=== Misconduct investigations and resignation ===
In December 2025, the Office of Inspector General for the Department of Labor received a complaint that Han and his deputy, Rebecca Wright, had facilitated personal travel for Chavez-DeRemer by announcing official events. The complaint also alleged that Chavez-DeRemer openly drank on the job with Han and Wright's knowledge. In January 2026, Politico reported that the aides had been placed on administrative leave. A member of Chavez-DeRemer's security detail, Brian Sloan, who was alleged to have had an affair with her, was also placed on leave. That month, the Metropolitan Police Department of the District of Columbia filed a report about forced sexual contact at the Department of Labor's building in December 2025. The New York Times reported that the report was connected to allegations that Chavez-DeRemer's husband, Shawn DeRemer, had inappropriately touched two women; the claims were added to the Office of Inspector General's inquiry. The Times additionally reported that DeRemer had been banned from entering the building in February 2026.

According to The New York Times, over two dozen current and former employees at the Department of Labor described a toxic workplace worsened by Chavez-DeRemer's frequent absences, combative aides, and demoralized workers, though the Office of Inspector General's inquiry was said to have improved morale. In the course of the investigation into DeRemer, Chavez-DeRemer's office was searched by the Metropolitan Police Department in February 2026; the inquiry closed that month. Amid the investigation, Han and Wright were fired in March 2026. The next day, Chavez-DeRemer's director of advance, Melissa Robey, was placed on leave. That month, Sloan resigned and Robey was fired by the Trump administration. The inquiry later expanded to include personal requests she texted to aides. Chavez-DeRemer was additionally the subject of three separate civil rights complaints from women. In April, Politico reported that Trump had "expressed frustration and disappointment" with Chavez-DeRemer and was considering removing her as the secretary of labor.

On April 20, 2026, Chavez-DeRemer resigned to work in the private sector. Her deputy, Keith Sonderling, became the acting secretary of labor hours later. The Office of Inspector General released its report in September, finding that Chavez-DeRemer had allowed harassment in the workplace, used department funds on personal travel, and had an affair with a member of her security detail.

== Post-government work (2026–present) ==
After resigning as the secretary of labor, Chavez-DeRemer joined the board of directors of the Log Cabin Republicans, an organization for homosexual and bisexual Republicans. By August 2026, she had become a communications advisor for Think Big, promoting data centers.

== Political positions ==
=== Domestic affairs ===
Chavez-DeRemer is considered a moderate Republican. After winning the 2022 United States House of Representatives election for Oregon's fifth congressional district, she said she would "approach every issue through a nonpartisan lens". By September 2016, Chavez-DeRemer said that Donald Trump had "not earned" her endorsement. In an interview with The Oregonian, she did not say whether she believed false claims of fraud in the 2020 presidential election. Chavez-DeRemer supported Trump after he won the Republican Party presidential primaries in March 2024. After Trump was convicted in the criminal trial over hush-money payments made to the pornographic actress Stormy Daniels, she refused to discuss his conviction. Chavez-DeRemer was one of six Republicans who signed a letter promising to affirm the results of the 2024 presidential election.

In her first congressional campaign, Chavez-DeRemer said she would seek to resolve water shortages in Oregon; fund police departments; and solve immigration to the United States, including closing the Mexico–United States border. After the Bend, Oregon shooting that year, she affirmed the right to keep and bear arms, but supported funding mental health resources. Chavez-DeRemer opposed the teaching of critical race theory in schools. She expressed skepticism about climatology and decarbonization, but supported water and timber conservation. Chavez-DeRemer said she did not support cuts to Medicare and Social Security. Amid protests in Portland, Oregon, over Immigration and Customs Enforcement operations in the city, she called the city a "crime-ridden war zone".

Chavez-DeRemer opposes abortion rights. After the Supreme Court's draft opinion for Dobbs v. Jackson Women's Health Organization (2022) leaked online, she advocated for passing heartbeat bills, expanding access to birth control, improving foster care, and encouraging adoptions; she praised the eventual ruling. Chavez-DeRemer later told KGW that she opposed federal abortion restrictions, including restrictions on abortion pills, a point of contention in efforts to pass the farm bill in 2023. After the Supreme Court of Alabama ruled in LePage v. Center for Reproductive Medicine (2024) that in vitro fertilization clinics could be held liable for wrongful deaths, she sought to affirm the practice.

=== Labor issues ===
Chavez-DeRemer supports establishing a national right-to-work law and repealing the Davis–Bacon Act. She cosponsored a bill to restore a tax deduction for union dues. As United Parcel Service workers neared a strike in 2023, Chavez-DeRemer signed a letter supporting the International Brotherhood of Teamsters's right to strike. She was one of three Republican cosponsors of the Protecting the Right to Organize Act. Chavez-DeRemer praised Trump's executive order directing the Department of Labor to revise fiduciary guidelines to favor assets such as private equity and cryptocurrency in retirement plans.

In August 2025, Chavez-DeRemer praised Trump's decision to fire Erika McEntarfer, the commissioner of labor statistics, after the Bureau of Labor Statistics published a jobs report that indicated job numbers were being revised downward. Chavez-DeRemer wrote that she agreed with Trump that "jobs numbers must be fair, accurate, and never manipulated for political purposes", suggesting without evidence that McEntarfer had manipulated the jobs report.

=== Foreign policy ===
Chavez-DeRemer supported Israel after the October 7 attacks. In September 2024, she signed a letter expressing concerns about China's advances in cultivated meat.

== Electoral history ==
=== 2024 ===
2024 Oregon's 5th congressional district general election
Party	Candidate	Votes	%
Democratic	Janelle Bynum	191,365	47.7
Republican	Lori Chavez-DeRemer (incumbent)	180,420	45.0
Independent	Brett Smith	18,665	4.7
Libertarian	Sonja Feintech	6,193	1.5
Pacific Green	Andrea Thorn Townsend	4,155	1.0
Write-in		495	0.1
Total votes		401,293	100%

2024 Oregon's 5th congressional district Republican primary
Party	Candidate	Votes	%
Republican	Lori Chavez-DeRemer (incumbent)	54,458	98.18
Republican	Write-in	1,009	1.81
Total votes		55,467	100.0

=== 2022 ===
2022 Oregon's 5th congressional district general election
Party	Candidate	Votes	%
Republican	Lori Chavez-DeRemer	178,813	50.91
Democratic	Jamie McLeod-Skinner	171,514	48.83
Write-in		906	0.26
Total votes		351,233	100.0

2022 Oregon's 5th congressional district Republican primary
Party	Candidate	Votes	%
Republican	Lori Chavez-DeRemer	30,438	42.77
Republican	Jimmy Crumpacker	20,631	28.99
Republican	John Di Paola	11,486	16.14
Republican	Laurel L. Roses	6,321	8.88
Republican	Madison Oatman	1,863	2.62
Republican	Write-in	429	0.60
Total votes		71,168	100.0

=== 2018 ===
2018 Oregon House of Representatives 51st district election
Party	Candidate	Votes	%
Democratic	Janelle Bynum (incumbent)	14,843	53.92
Republican	Lori Chavez-DeRemer	12,620	45.85
Write-in		63	0.23
Total votes		27,526	100.0

2018 Oregon House of Representatives 51st district Republican primary
Party	Candidate	Votes	%
Republican	Lori Chavez-DeRemer	2,453	97.77
Republican	Write-in	56	2.23
Total votes		2,509	100.0

=== 2016 ===
2016 Oregon House of Representatives 51st district election
Party	Candidate	Votes	%
Democratic	Janelle Bynum	14,310	50.85
Republican	Lori Chavez-DeRemer	13,746	48.85
Write-in		86	0.30
Total votes		28,142	100.0

2016 Oregon House of Representatives 51st district Republican primary
Party	Candidate	Votes	%
Republican	Lori Chavez-DeRemer	3,255	96.14
Republican	Write-in	96	2.86
Total votes		3,351	100.0

=== 2014 ===
Happy Valley mayoral election, 2014
Party	Candidate	Votes	%
Nonpartisan	Lori Chavez-DeRemer (incumbent)	3,682	94.63
Write-in		209	5.37
Total votes		3,891	100.0

=== 2010 ===
Happy Valley mayoral election, 2010
Party	Candidate	Votes	%
Nonpartisan	Lori DeRemer	2,749	94.63
Write-in		156	5.37
Total votes		2,905	100.0

== See also ==
- List of Hispanic and Latino Americans in the United States Congress

U.S. House of Representatives
Preceded by Kurt Schrader	Member of the U.S. House of Representatives from Oregon's 5th congressional district 2023–2025	Succeeded by Janelle Bynum
Political offices
Preceded by Julie Su; Acting	United States Secretary of Labor; 2025–2026	Succeeded by Keith Sonderling
Order of precedence
Preceded by Pam Bondi as Former U.S. Cabinet Member	Order of precedence of the United States as Former U.S. Cabinet Member	Succeeded by Patrick Leahy as Former President pro tempore of the U.S. Senate
