= 2018 United States House of Representatives elections in Oregon =

- November 6, 2018

All 5 Oregon seats to the United States House of Representatives
	Majority party	Minority party
Party	Democratic	Republican
Last election	4	1
Seats won	4	1
Seat change	Steady	Steady
Popular vote	1,061,412	702,531
Percentage	57.45%	38.02%
Swing	▲3.74%	▼0.21%

Democratic
40–50%
50–60%
60–70%
70–80%
Republican
50–60%
60–70%
70–80%

The 2018 United States House of Representatives elections in Oregon were held on Tuesday, November 6, 2018, to elect the five U.S. representatives from the U.S. state of Oregon; one from each of the state's five congressional districts. The primaries were held on May 15, 2018. The elections and primaries coincided with the elections and primaries of other federal and state offices.

All five incumbents were re-elected, leaving Oregon at a 4–1 split in favor of the Democrats.

== Overview ==
Results of the 2018 United States House of Representatives elections in Oregon by district:

District	Democratic		Republican		Others		Total		Result
District	Votes	%	Votes	%	Votes	%	Votes	%	Result
District 1	231,198	63.65%	116,446	32.06%	15,605	4.30%	363,249	100.0%	Democratic hold
District 2	145,298	39.41%	207,597	56.30%	15,814	4.29%	368,709	100.0%	Republican hold
District 3	279,019	72.60%	76,187	19.82%	29,120	7.58%	384,326	100.0%	Democratic hold
District 4	208,710	55.97%	152,414	40.87%	11,769	3.16%	372,893	100.0%	Democratic hold
District 5	197,187	55.01%	149,887	41.81%	11,395	3.18%	358,469	100.0%	Democratic hold
Total	1,061,412	57.45%	702,531	38.02%	83,703	4.53%	1,847,646	100.0%	

== District 1 ==
2018 Oregon's 1st congressional district election
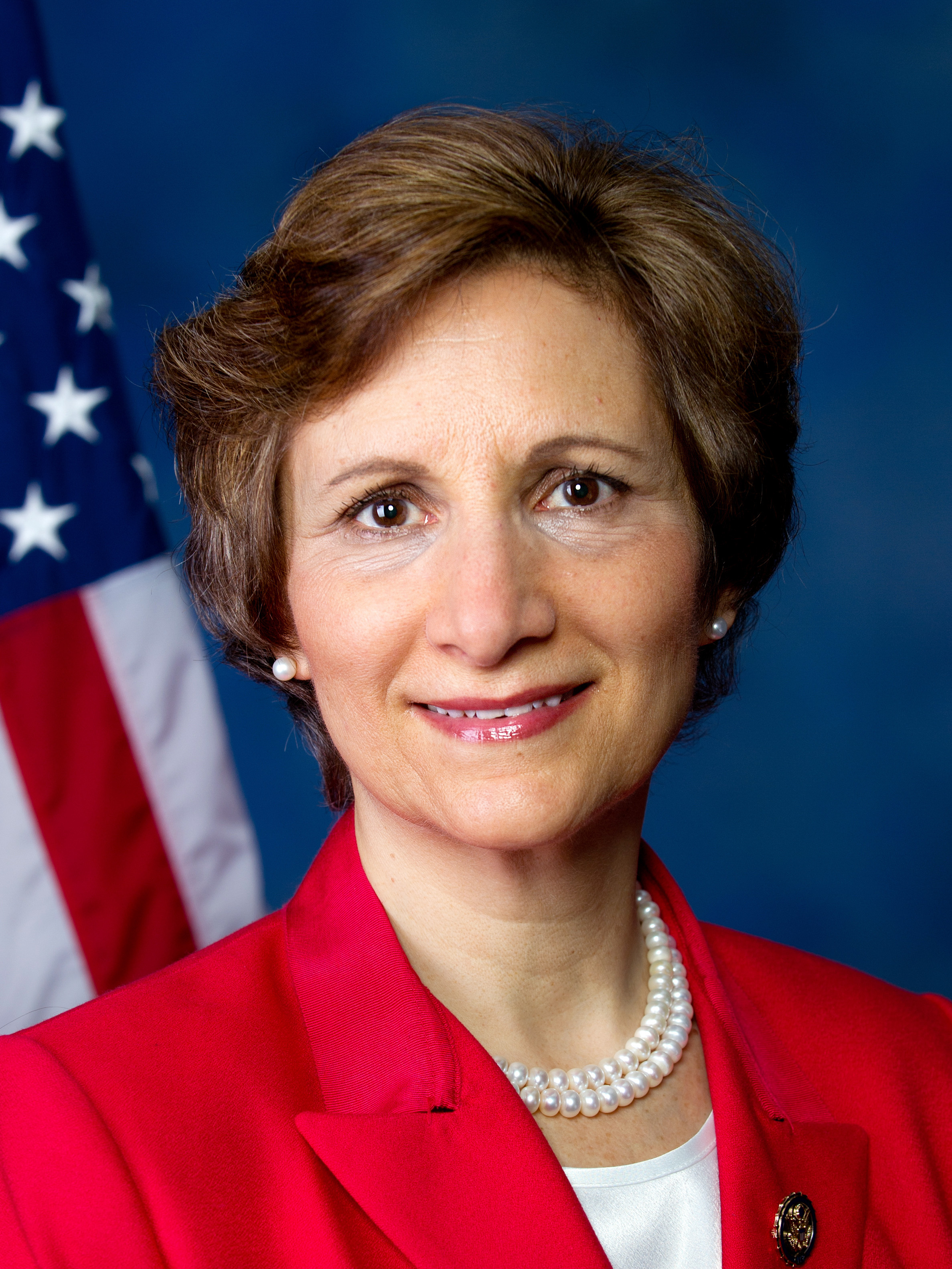

Nominee	Suzanne Bonamici	John Verbeek
Party	Democratic	Republican
Popular vote	231,198	116,446
Percentage	63.6%	32.1%
- Bonamici: 40–50% 50–60% 60–70% 70–80% 80–90% >90% Verbeek: 40–50% 50–60% 60–70% 70–80% >90% Tie: 40–50% No votes
U.S. Representative before election
Suzanne Bonamici
Democratic
Elected U.S. Representative
Suzanne Bonamici
Democratic

The 1st district is located in northwestern Oregon and stretches from coastal cities of the Astoria and Seaside, to the parts of Portland and the surrounding suburbs such as Beaverton, Hillsboro, and Newberg. This district had a PVI of D+9. The incumbent was Democrat Suzanne Bonamici, who had represented the district since 2012. She was re-elected with 60% of the vote in 2016. She faced Republican nominee John Verbeek in the November 2018 general election.

=== Democratic primary ===
- Ricky Barajas
- Suzanne Bonamici, incumbent
- Michael Stansfield

==== Primary results ====
Democratic primary results
Party	Candidate	Votes	%
Democratic	Suzanne Bonamici (incumbent)	69,774	91.7
Democratic	Ricky Barajas	2,945	3.9
Democratic	Michael E. Stansfield	2,936	3.8
Democratic	Write-ins	424	0.6
Total votes		76,079	100.0

=== Republican primary ===
- George Griffith, engineer
- Preston Miller
- John Verbeek

==== Primary results ====
Republican primary results
Party	Candidate	Votes	%
Republican	John Verbeek	21,191	50.6
Republican	George Griffith	17,049	40.7
Republican	Preston L. Miller	3,228	7.7
Republican	Write-ins	402	1.0
Total votes		41,870	100.0

=== Independent primary ===
==== Primary results ====
Independent primary results
Party	Candidate	Votes	%
Independent Party	Suzanne Bonamici (incumbent) (write-in)	406	32.8
Independent Party	Other write-ins	832	67.2
Total votes		1,238	100

=== General election ===
==== Predictions ====
Source	Ranking	As of
The Cook Political Report	Safe D	November 5, 2018
Inside Elections	Safe D	November 5, 2018
Sabato's Crystal Ball	Safe D	November 5, 2018
RCP	Safe D	November 5, 2018
Daily Kos	Safe D	November 5, 2018
538	Safe D	November 7, 2018
CNN	Safe D	October 31, 2018
Politico	Safe D	November 2, 2018

==== Results ====
Oregon's 1st congressional district, 2018
Party	Candidate	Votes	%	±%
Democratic	Suzanne Bonamici (incumbent)	231,198	63.6	+4.0
Republican	John Verbeek	116,446	32.1	−4.9
Libertarian	Drew A. Layda	15,121	4.2	+1.0
n/a	Write-ins	484	0.1	−0.1
Total votes		363,249	100.0	N/A
Democratic hold				

== District 2 ==
2018 Oregon's 2nd congressional district election
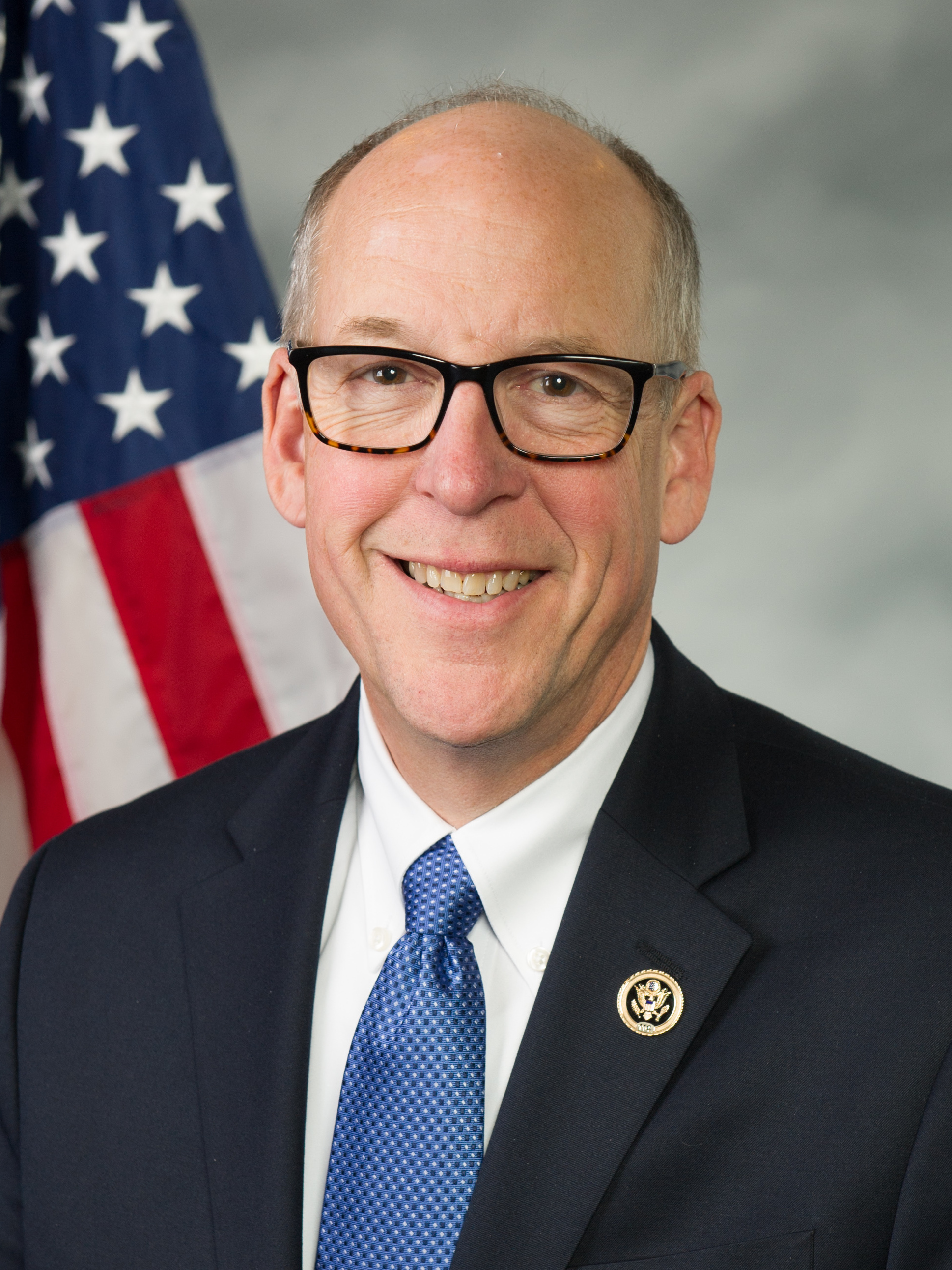

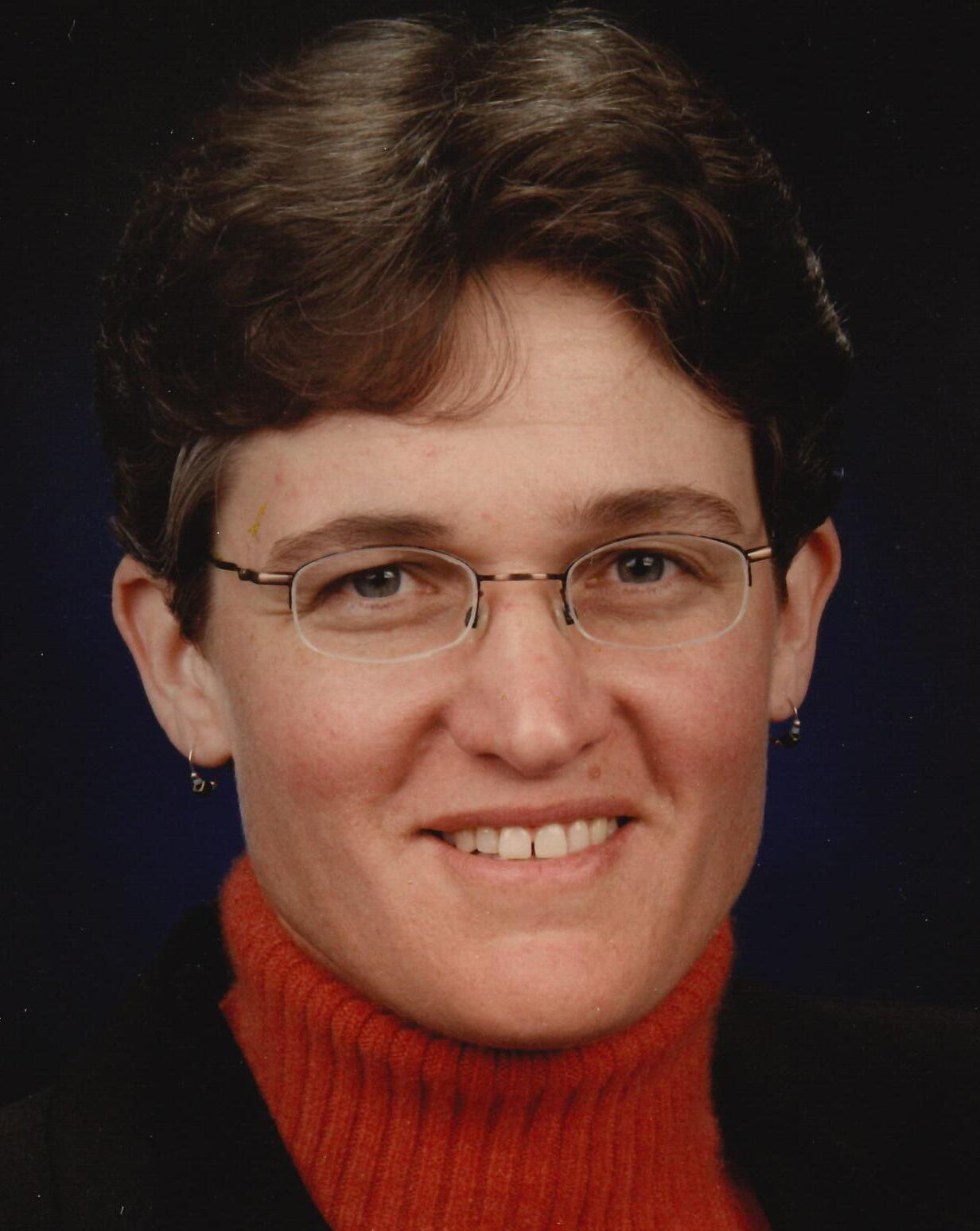
Nominee	Greg Walden	Jamie McLeod-Skinner
Party	Republican	Democratic
Popular vote	207,597	145,298
Percentage	56.3%	39.4%
- Walden: 40–50% 50–60% 60–70% 70–80% 80–90% >90% Skinner: 40–50% 50–60% 60–70% 70–80% 80–90% No votes
U.S. Representative before election
Greg Walden
Republican
Elected U.S. Representative
Greg Walden
Republican

Oregon's second district is made up of rural eastern Oregon and stretches into southern Oregon, including Bend, Klamath Falls, and Medford. This was the most Republican district in Oregon, with a PVI of R+11.

The incumbent, Republican Greg Walden of Hood River, was re-nominated in the May 2018 primary election. He had represented the district since 1999, and was re-elected with 72% of the vote in 2016. He had faced little serious opposition in recent years, but in 2018 was heavily criticized by constituents for helping to write a bill to repeal and replace the Affordable Care Act.

Democrat Jamie McLeod-Skinner of Terrebonne won her party's nomination in May 2018. She had criticized Walden for skipping public events and declining to take strong stands on behalf of his constituents. Incumbent Walden agreed in July to debate McLeod-Skinner, but as of early September, no debate had been scheduled.

As of November 2018, national handicappers considered the district "safe Republican."

=== Democratic primary ===
- Eric Burnette
- Michael Byrne, stonemason
- Jim Crary, attorney
- Raz Mason, teacher
- Jamie McLeod-Skinner, environmental attorney
- Jennifer Neahring, physician
- Timothy White, CFO

==== Primary results ====
Democratic primary results
Party	Candidate	Votes	%
Democratic	Jamie McLeod-Skinner	25,351	42.8
Democratic	Jennifer Neahring	14,020	23.7
Democratic	James Crary	6,774	11.4
Democratic	Tim S. White	3,469	5.9
Democratic	Raz Mason	3,137	5.3
Democratic	Eric Burnette	2,734	4.6
Democratic	Michael Byrne	2,546	4.3
Democratic	Write-ins	1,173	2.0
Total votes		59,204	100.0

=== Republican primary ===
- Randy Pollock
- Paul Romero
- Greg Walden, incumbent

==== Primary results ====
Republican primary results
Party	Candidate	Votes	%
Republican	Greg Walden (incumbent)	71,543	77.3
Republican	Paul J. Romero Jr	15,181	16.4
Republican	Randy Pollock	5,514	6.0
Republican	Write-ins	280	0.3
Total votes		92,518	100.0

=== Independent primary ===
==== Primary results ====
Independent primary results
Party	Candidate	Votes	%
Independent Party	Mark R. Roberts	3,441	66.0
Independent Party	Write-ins	1,773	34.0
Total votes		5,214	100.0

=== General election ===
==== Predictions ====
Source	Ranking	As of
The Cook Political Report	Safe R	November 5, 2018
Inside Elections	Safe R	November 5, 2018
Sabato's Crystal Ball	Safe R	November 5, 2018
RCP	Safe R	November 5, 2018
Daily Kos	Safe R	November 5, 2018
538	Safe R	November 7, 2018
CNN	Safe R	October 31, 2018
Politico	Safe R	November 4, 2018

==== Polling ====
Poll source	Date(s) administered	Sample size	Margin of error	Greg Walden (R)	Jamie McLeod-Skinner (D)	Mark Roberts (I)	Undecided
Patinkin Research Strategies (D-McLeod-Skinner)	October 11–12, 2018	400	± 5.0%	49%	40%	7%	5%

==== Results ====
This was the closest race ever in Greg Walden's political history, the first time he had received less than 60% of the votes.

Oregon's 2nd congressional district, 2018
Party	Candidate	Votes	%	±%
Republican	Greg Walden (incumbent)	207,597	56.3	−15.4
Democratic	Jamie McLeod-Skinner	145,298	39.4	+11.4
Independent Party	Mark Roberts	15,536	4.2	N/A
n/a	Write-ins	278	0.1	−0.2
Total votes		368,709	100.0	N/A
Republican hold				

== District 3 ==
2018 Oregon's 3rd congressional district election
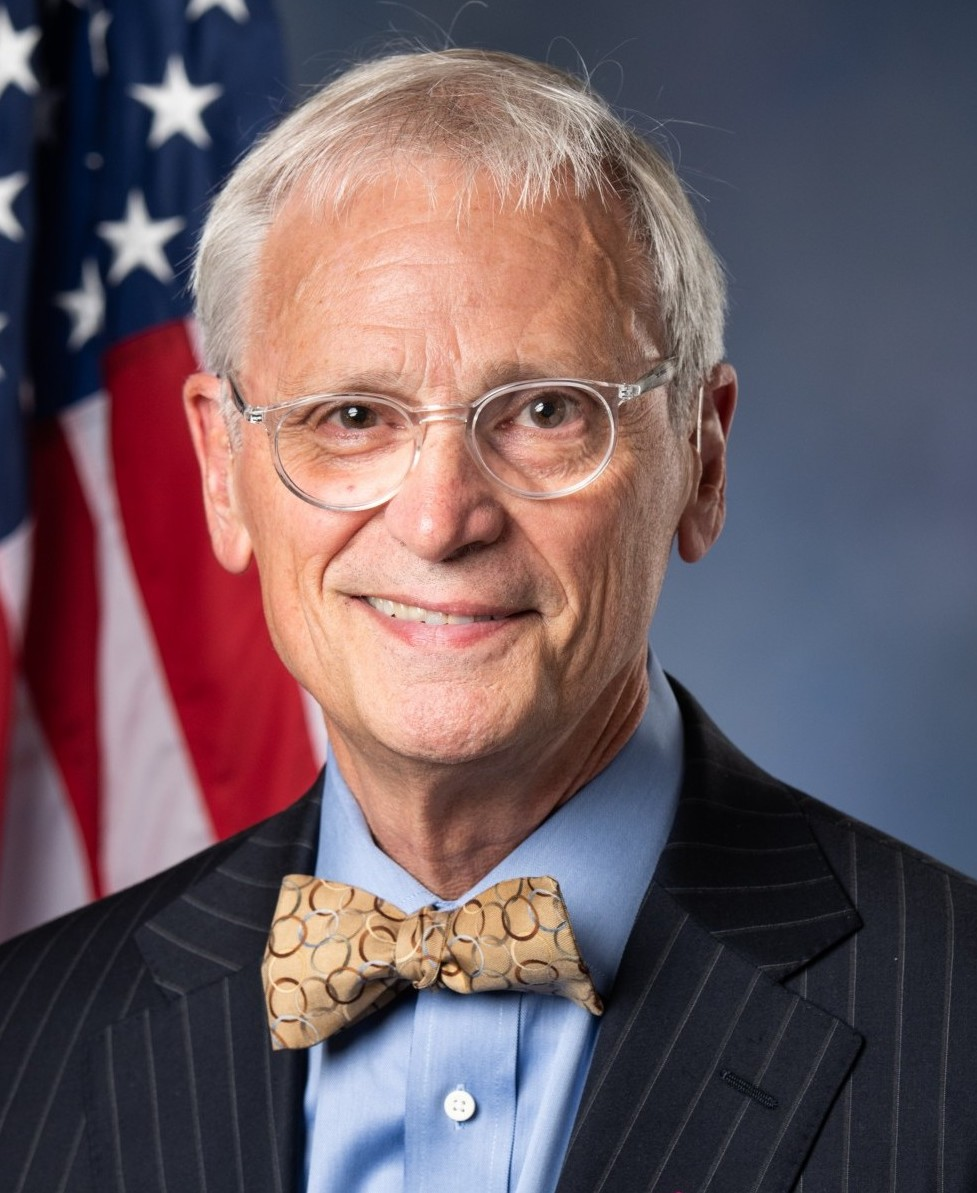

Nominee	Earl Blumenauer	Thomas Harrison	Marc Koller
Party	Democratic	Republican	Independent Party
Alliance			Pacific Green
Popular vote	279,019	76,187	21,352
Percentage	72.6%	19.8%	5.6%
- Blumenaur: 40–50% 50–60% 60–70% 70–80% 80–90% >90% Harrison: 40–50% 50–60% 60–70% 70–80% Tie: 40–50% No votes
U.S. Representative before election
Earl Blumenauer
Democratic
Elected U.S. Representative
Earl Blumenauer
Democratic

The 3rd district is centered around the city of Portland, and includes the surrounding suburbs such as Estacada, Fairview, and Gresham. This was the most Democratic-friendly district in the state, with a PVI of D+24. The incumbent was Democrat Earl Blumenauer, who had represented the district since 1996. He was re-elected with 72% of the vote in 2016. He faced Independent Party nominee Marc Koller and Republican write-in nominee Tom Harrison in the November 2018 general election.

=== Democratic primary ===
- Earl Blumenauer, incumbent
- Eric Hafner, activist
- Ben Lavine
- Charles Rand Barnett

==== Primary results ====
Democratic primary results
Party	Candidate	Votes	%
Democratic	Earl Blumenauer (incumbent)	91,226	90.8
Democratic	Ben Lavine	6,008	6.0
Democratic	Charles Rand Barnett	1,586	1.6
Democratic	Eric Hafner	1,377	1.4
Democratic	Write-ins	291	0.3
Total votes		100,488	100.0

=== Republican primary ===
==== Primary results ====
Republican primary results
Party	Candidate	Votes	%
Republican	Thomas Harrison (write-in)	104	6.6
Republican	Other write-ins	1,470	93.4
Total votes		1,574	100.0

=== Independent primary ===
==== Primary results ====
Independent primary results
Party	Candidate	Votes	%
Independent Party	Marc W. Koller	930	42.0
Independent Party	David W. Walker	741	33.5
Independent Party	Write-ins	542	24.5
Total votes		2,213	100.0

=== General election ===
==== Predictions ====
Source	Ranking	As of
The Cook Political Report	Safe D	November 5, 2018
Inside Elections	Safe D	November 5, 2018
Sabato's Crystal Ball	Safe D	November 5, 2018
RCP	Safe D	November 5, 2018
Daily Kos	Safe D	November 5, 2018
538	Safe D	November 7, 2018
CNN	Safe D	October 31, 2018
Politico	Safe D	November 4, 2018

==== Results ====
Oregon's 3rd congressional district, 2018
Party	Candidate	Votes	%
Democratic	Earl Blumenauer (incumbent)	279,019	72.6
Republican	Tom Harrison	76,187	19.8
Independent Party	Marc Koller	21,352	5.6
Libertarian	Gary Dye	5,767	1.5
Constitution	Michael Marsh	1,487	0.4
n/a	Write-ins	514	0.1
Total votes		384,326	100.0
Democratic hold			

== District 4 ==
2018 Oregon's 4th congressional district election
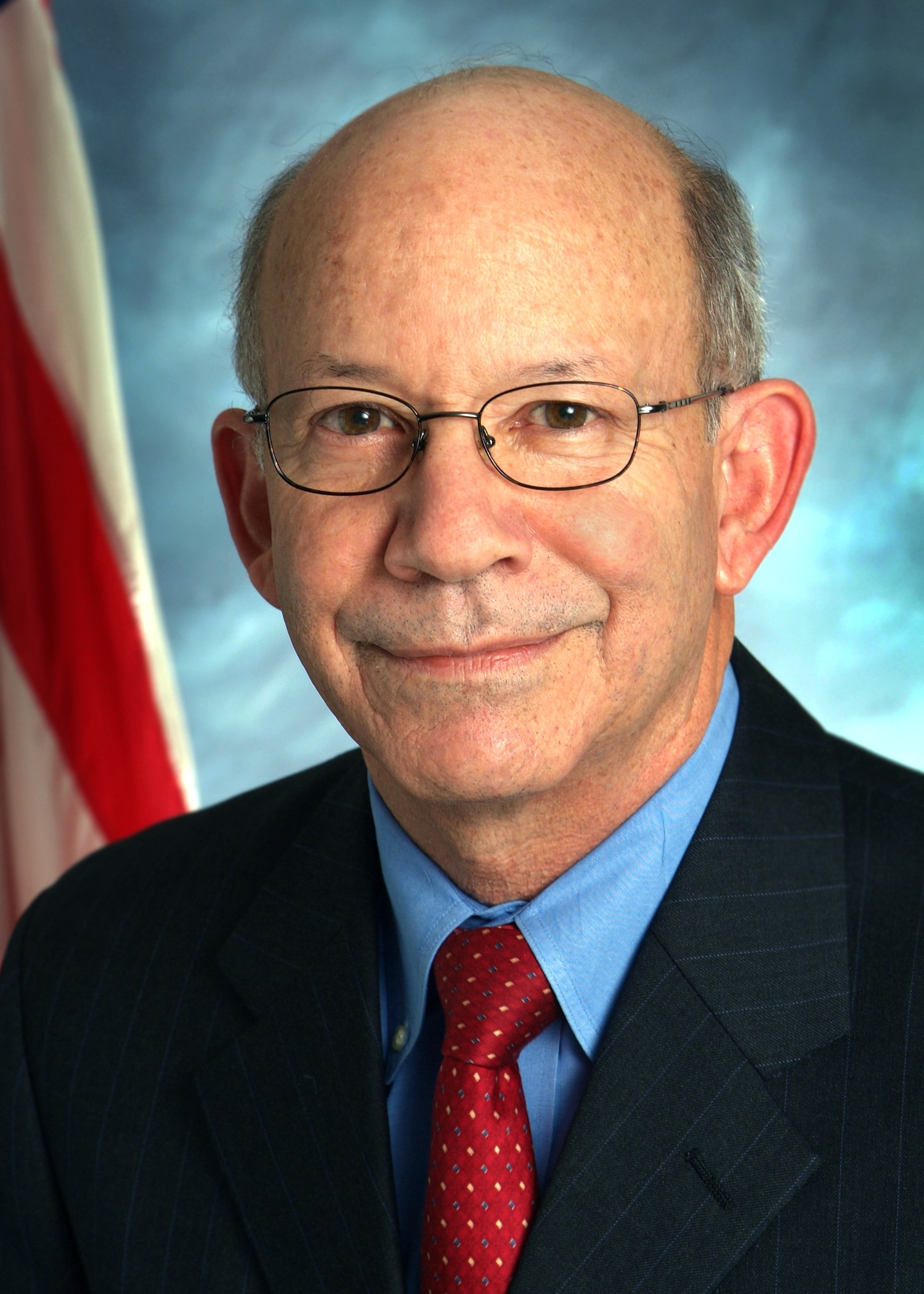

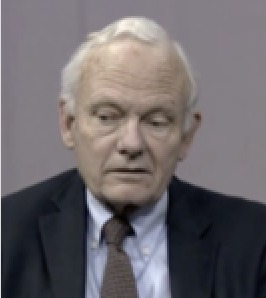
Nominee	Peter DeFazio	Art Robinson
Party	Democratic	Republican
Popular vote	208,710	152,414
Percentage	56.0%	40.9%
- DeFazio: 40–50% 50–60% 60–70% 70–80% 80–90% >90% Robinson: 40–50% 50–60% 60–70% 70–80% 80–90% Tie: 50% No votes
U.S. Representative before election
Peter DeFazio
Democratic
Elected U.S. Representative
Peter DeFazio
Democratic

The 4th district is located in the South Coast region of Oregon. Cities in this district include Coos Bay, Eugene, and Roseburg. This was a highly competitive district, with an even PVI. The incumbent was Democrat Peter DeFazio, who had represented the district since 1987. He was re-elected with 55% of the vote in 2016. He faced Art Robinson for the fifth time; Robinson had been the Republican nominee in the district in every election since 2010.

=== Democratic primary ===
- Daniel Arcangel
- Peter DeFazio, incumbent

==== Primary results ====
Democratic primary results
Party	Candidate	Votes	%
Democratic	Peter A. DeFazio (incumbent)	78,575	91.4
Democratic	Daniel Arcangel	6,672	7.8
Democratic	Write-ins	717	0.8
Total votes		85,964	100.0

=== Republican primary ===
- Court Boice, Curry County commissioner
- Jo Rae Perkins, business owner
- Michael Polen
- Art Robinson, chemist
- Stefan Strek

==== Primary results ====
Republican primary results
Party	Candidate	Votes	%
Republican	Arthur B. Robinson	30,384	45.5
Republican	Court Boice	15,773	23.6
Republican	Jo Rae Perkins	13,892	20.8
Republican	Michael Polen	3,970	5.9
Republican	Stefan G. Strek	2,244	3.4
Republican	Write-ins	503	0.8
Total votes		66,766	100.0

=== Independent primary ===
==== Primary results ====
Independent primary results
Party	Candidate	Votes	%
Independent Party	Peter A. DeFazio (incumbent) (write-in)	888	32.9
Independent Party	Other write-ins	1,811	67.1
Total votes		2,699	100.0

=== General election ===
==== Predictions ====
Source	Ranking	As of
The Cook Political Report	Safe D	November 5, 2018
Inside Elections	Safe D	November 5, 2018
Sabato's Crystal Ball	Safe D	November 5, 2018
RCP	Safe D	November 5, 2018
Daily Kos	Safe D	November 5, 2018
538	Safe D	November 7, 2018
CNN	Safe D	October 31, 2018
Politico	Safe D	November 4, 2018

==== Results ====
Oregon's 4th congressional district, 2018
Party	Candidate	Votes	%
Democratic	Peter DeFazio (incumbent)	208,710	56.0
Republican	Art Robinson	152,414	40.9
Pacific Green	Mike Beilstein	5,956	1.6
Libertarian	Richard Jacobson	5,370	1.4
n/a	Write-ins	443	0.1
Total votes		372,893	100.0
Democratic hold			

== District 5 ==
2018 Oregon's 5th congressional district election
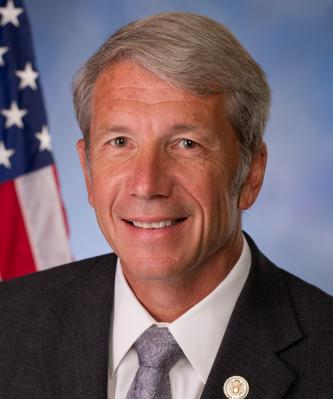

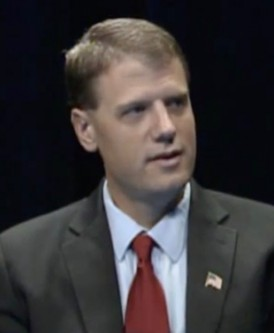
Nominee	Kurt Schrader	Mark Callahan
Party	Democratic	Republican
Popular vote	197,187	149,887
Percentage	55.0%	41.8%
- Schrader: 40–50% 50–60% 60–70% 70–80% 80–90% Callahan: 40–50% 50–60% 60–70% 70–80% >90% No votes
U.S. Representative before election
Kurt Schrader
Democratic
Elected U.S. Representative
Kurt Schrader
Democratic

The 5th district is centered around the state capital, Salem. The district stretches from the Central Coast region to the southern Portland suburbs, including Lake Oswego, Wilsonville, and Oregon City. The district was highly competitive, with an even PVI. The incumbent was Democrat Kurt Schrader, who had represented the district since 2009. He was re-elected with 53% of the vote in 2016. He faced Republican nominee Mark Callahan in the November 2018 general election.

=== Democratic primary ===
- Kurt Schrader, incumbent
- Peter Wright

==== Primary results ====
Democratic primary results
Party	Candidate	Votes	%
Democratic	Kurt Schrader (incumbent)	59,196	86.1
Democratic	Peter Wright	9,002	13.1
Democratic	Write-ins	549	0.8
Total votes		68,747	100.0

=== Republican primary ===
- Mark Callahan, perennial candidate
- Joey Nations
- Robert Reynolds

==== Primary results ====
Republican primary results
Party	Candidate	Votes	%
Republican	Mark Callahan	33,933	61.9
Republican	Joey Nations	11,300	20.6
Republican	Robert L. Reynolds	9,120	16.6
Republican	Write-ins	465	0.8
Total votes		54,818	100.0

=== Independent primary ===
==== Primary results ====
Independent primary results
Party	Candidate	Votes	%
Independent Party	Kurt Schrader (incumbent) (write-in)	498	31.9
Independent Party	Other write-ins	1,065	68.2
Total votes		1,563	100

=== General election ===
==== Predictions ====
Source	Ranking	As of
The Cook Political Report	Safe D	November 5, 2018
Inside Elections	Safe D	November 5, 2018
Sabato's Crystal Ball	Safe D	November 5, 2018
RCP	Lean D	November 5, 2018
Daily Kos	Safe D	November 5, 2018
538	Likely D	November 7, 2018
CNN	Safe D	October 31, 2018
Politico	Safe D	November 4, 2018

==== Polling ====
Poll source	Date(s) administered	Sample size	Margin of error	Kurt Schrader (D)	Mark Callahan (R)	Undecided
Gravis Marketing	October 8, 2018	359	± 5.2%	33%	56%	11%

==== Results ====
Oregon's 5th congressional district, 2018
Party	Candidate	Votes	%
Democratic	Kurt Schrader (incumbent)	197,187	55.0
Republican	Mark Callahan	149,887	41.8
Libertarian	Dan Souza	6,054	1.7
Pacific Green	Marvin Sandnes	4,802	1.3
n/a	Write-ins	539	0.2
Total votes		358,469	100.0
Democratic hold			
