= Alliance of Health Care Unions =

Labor federation representing 52,000 healthcare workers

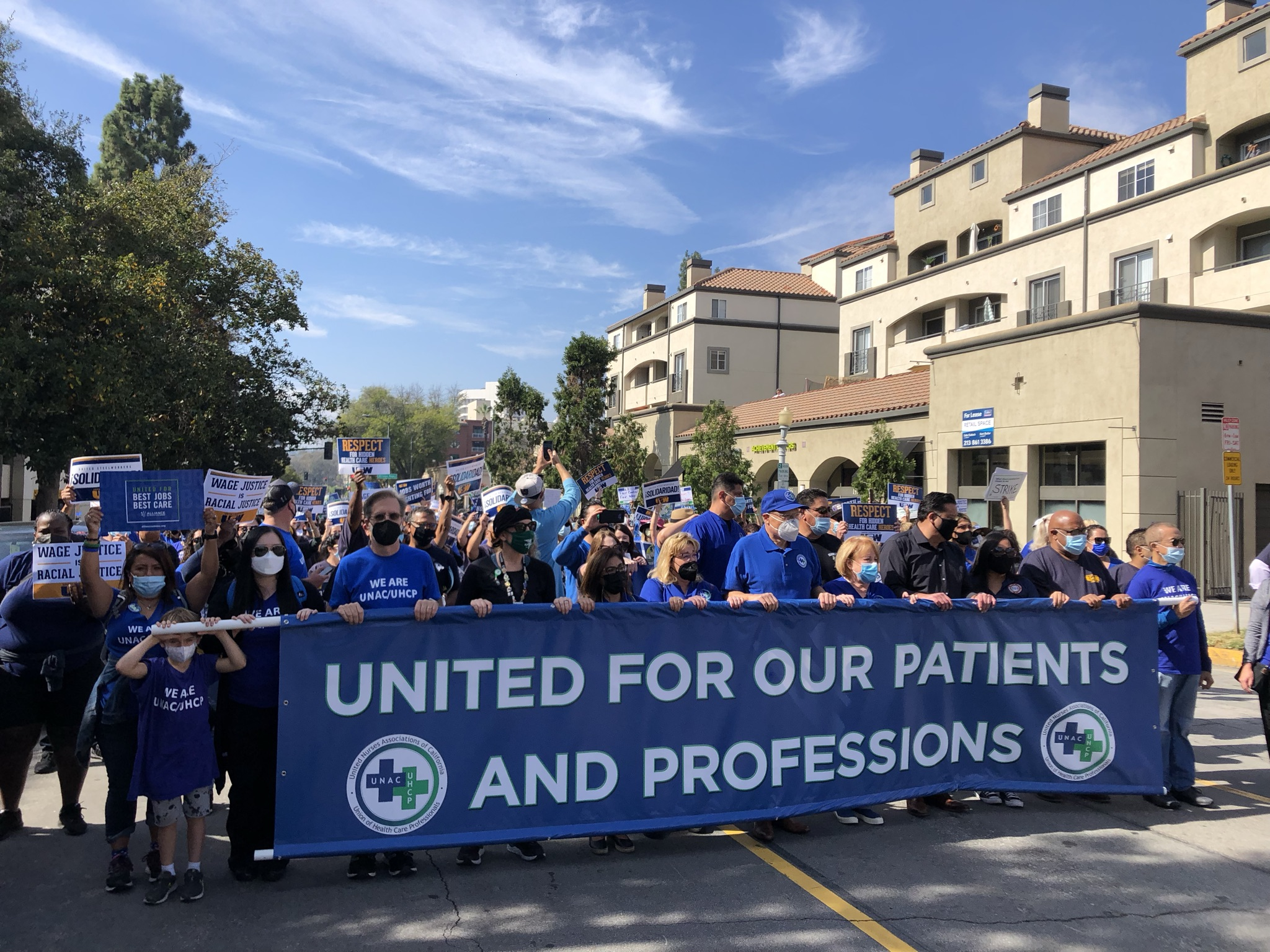
Alliance members marching on October 30, 2021.

The Alliance of Health Care Unions (Alliance) is a union federation of 21 local unions representing roughly 52,000 Kaiser Permanente (KP) employees. The Alliance is one of two union federations that are part of the largest and longest running Labor Management Partnership in the U.S. In 2021, more than 40,000 Alliance members were on the verge of the largest open-ended healthcare strike over concerns of short staffing and a two-tier wage system proposed by KP. On November 13, 2021, the Alliance and KP reached an agreement that preserved leading wages and benefits and defeated the two-tier system.

== Membership ==
List of union locals that are part of the Alliance:

- Hawaii Nurses and Health Care Professionals (HNHP): Registered nurses, nurse practitioners, and respiratory therapists employed by Kaiser Permanente in Hawaii.
- International Brotherhood of Teamsters (IBT) Local 166: More than 600 imaging techs and other health care workers in Southern California.
- International Longshore and Warehouse Union (ILWU) Local 28: Security guards in Kaiser Permanente Northwest.
- International Union of Operating Engineers (IUOE), Locals 1 and 501: Skilled Maintenance, building engineers, biomedical engineers and others in Colorado and Southern California.
- Kaiser Permanente Nurse Anesthetists Association (KPNAA): Certified nurse anesthetists in Southern California.
- Oregon Federation of Nurses & Health Professionals (OFNHP) AFT Local 5017: Registered nurses, dental hygienists, lab professionals and other health care professionals in the Northwest, Portland area.
- United Food and Commercial Workers (UFCW) Local 7: Registered nurses, psychologists, social workers, pharmacists and other health care professionals in Colorado.
- United Food and Commercial Workers (UFCW) Local 21: Pharmacists, pharmacy technicians, imaging and respiratory techs, clinical lab scientists and other healthcare professionals in Washington state.
- United Food and Commercial Workers (UFCW) Local 27: Registered nurses, pharmacists, psychologists and other health care professionals in the Mid-Atlantic area.
- United Food and Commercial Workers (UFCW) Locals 135, 324, 770, 1167, 1428, 1442: Pharmacy clerks, technicians and clinical lab scientists in Southern California, including all Kaiser Permanente tech, service, clinical and administrative workers in Kern County.
- United Food and Commercial Workers (UFCW) Local 400: Registered nurses and health care professionals in the Mid-Atlantic area.
- United Food and Commercial Workers (UFCW) Local 1996: Registered nurses, service, technical, professionals for all of KP Georgia.
- United Steelworkers Local 7600: Service, technical, skilled maintenance and clerical workers in Southern California.
- United Nurses Associations of California/Union of Health Care Professionals (UNAC/UHCP): 21,000 nurses, mid-wives, nurse practitioners, pharmacists, rehab therapists, optometrists and other healthcare professionals in Southern and Northern California and Hawaii.
- UNITE HERE Local 5: Service and technical workers in Hawaii.

== Healthcare strikes ==
Over 40,000 Alliance members gave Kaiser Permanente strike notice and were the verge of a historic healthcare strike over concerns about short staffing and a two-tier wage system.

"Kaiser Permanente's latest proposal is an insulting 2% wage increase contingent upon union's agreement to a two-tier wage system, which threatens to cut 26-33% of wages for all future hires. Kaiser Permanente also refuses to address the short-staffing impacting all its facilities. Workers report being stressed, overworked, and burnt out while taking care of our community throughout the pandemic."

The strike authorization votes by Alliance Unions became widely anticipated as part of Striketober and Strikesgiving. On November 13, 2021, the Alliance and KP reached an agreement that preserved leading wages and benefits and defeated the two-tier system.
