= Oregon's 3rd congressional district =

U.S. House district for Oregon

Coordinates: 45°30′N 122°30′W

- Interactive map of district boundaries since January 3, 2023
- Representative: Maxine Dexter; D–Portland
- Area: 1,021 mi^{2} (2,640 km^{2})
- Distribution: 93.12% urban; 6.88% rural
- Population (2025): 690,019
- Median household income: $94,077
- Ethnicity: 64.5% White; 14.2% Hispanic; 7.5% Asian; 6.5% Two or more races; 5.5% Black; 1.9% other
- Occupation: 59.4% White-collar; 25% Blue-collar; 15.5% Gray-collar
- Cook PVI: D+24

Oregon's 3rd congressional district covers most of Multnomah County, including Gresham, Troutdale, and most of Portland east of the Willamette River (parts of Northwest and Southwest Portland lie in the 1st and 5th districts). It also includes the northeastern part of Clackamas County and all of Hood River County.

The district has been represented by Democrat Maxine Dexter since 2025. With a Cook Partisan Voting Index rating of D+24, it is the most Democratic district in Oregon and the second most Democratic district in the Pacific Northwest after Washington's 7th.

== Composition ==
For the 118th and successive Congresses (based on redistricting following the 2020 census), the district contains all or portions of the following counties and communities:

Clackamas County (8)

Boring, Damascus, Estacada, Government Camp, Happy Valley (part; also 5th), Mount Hood Village, Portland (part; also 1st and 5th; shared with Multnomah and Washington counties) Rhododendron, Sandy

Hood River County (5)

All 5 communities

Multnomah County (7)

Fairview, Gresham, Maywood Park, Orient, Portland (part; also 1st and 5th; shared with Clackamas and Washington counties), Troutdale, Wood Village

== List of members representing the district ==
The district was created in 1913, sending its first representative to the 63rd Congress.

| Member District home | Party | Years | Cong ess | Electoral history |
|---|---|---|---|---|
District established March 4, 1913
| Walter Lafferty (Portland) | Republican | March 4, 1913 – March 3, 1915 | 63rd | Redistricted from the 2nd district and re-elected in 1912. Lost renomination. |
| Clifton N. McArthur (Portland) | Republican | March 4, 1915 – March 3, 1923 | 64th 65th 66th 67th | Elected in 1914. Re-elected in 1916. Re-elected in 1918. Re-elected in 1920. Lost re-election. |
| Elton Watkins (Portland) | Democratic | March 4, 1923 – March 3, 1925 | 68th | Elected in 1922. Lost re-election. |
| Maurice E. Crumpacker (Portland) | Republican | March 4, 1925 – July 24, 1927 | 69th 70th | Elected in 1924. Re-elected in 1926. Died. |
| Vacant | | July 24, 1927 – October 18, 1927 | 70th | |
| Franklin F. Korell (Portland) | Republican | October 18, 1927 – March 3, 1931 | 70th 71st | Elected to finish Crumpacker's term. Re-elected in 1928. Lost re-election. |
| Charles H. Martin (Portland) | Democratic | March 4, 1931 – January 3, 1935 | 72nd 73rd | Elected in 1930. Re-elected in 1932. Retired to run for governor. |
| William A. Ekwall (Portland) | Republican | January 3, 1935 – January 3, 1937 | 74th | Elected in 1934. Lost re-election. |
| Nan Wood Honeyman (Portland) | Democratic | January 3, 1937 – January 3, 1939 | 75th | Elected in 1936. Lost re-election. |
| Homer D. Angell (Portland) | Republican | January 3, 1939 – January 3, 1955 | 76th 77th 78th 79th 80th 81st 82nd 83rd | Elected in 1938. Re-elected in 1940. Re-elected in 1942. Re-elected in 1944. Re-elected in 1946. Re-elected in 1948. Re-elected in 1950. Re-elected in 1952. Lost renomination. |
| Edith Green (Portland) | Democratic | January 3, 1955 – December 31, 1974 | 84th 85th 86th 87th 88th 89th 90th 91st 92nd 93rd | Elected in 1954. Re-elected in 1956. Re-elected in 1958. Re-elected in 1960. Re-elected in 1962. Re-elected in 1964. Re-elected in 1966. Re-elected in 1968. Re-elected in 1970. Re-elected in 1972. Retired and resigned early. |
| Vacant | | December 31, 1974 – January 3, 1975 | 94th | |
| Robert B. Duncan (Gresham) | Democratic | January 3, 1975 – January 3, 1981 | 94th 95th 96th | Elected in 1974. Re-elected in 1976. Re-elected in 1978. Lost renomination. |
| Ron Wyden (Portland) | Democratic | January 3, 1981 – February 5, 1996 | 97th 98th 99th 100th 101st 102nd 103rd 104th | Elected in 1980. Re-elected in 1982. Re-elected in 1984. Re-elected in 1986. Re-elected in 1988. Re-elected in 1990. Re-elected in 1992. Re-elected in 1994. Resigned when elected U.S. Senator. |
| Vacant | | February 5, 1996 – May 21, 1996 | 104th | |
| Earl Blumenauer (Portland) | Democratic | May 21, 1996 – January 3, 2025 | 104th 105th 106th 107th 108th 109th 110th 111th 112th 113th 114th 115th 116th 117th 118th | Elected to finish Wyden's term. Re-elected in 1996. Re-elected in 1998. Re-elected in 2000. Re-elected in 2002. Re-elected in 2004. Re-elected in 2006. Re-elected in 2008. Re-elected in 2010. Re-elected in 2012. Re-elected in 2014. Re-elected in 2016. Re-elected in 2018. Re-elected in 2020. Re-elected in 2022. Retired. |
| Maxine Dexter (Portland) | Democratic | January 3, 2025 – present | 119th | Elected in 2024. Re-elected in 2026. |

== Recent election results from statewide races ==
| Year | Office | Results |
|---|---|---|
| 2008 | President | Obama 72% - 26% |
| 2012 | President | Obama 73% - 27% |
| 2016 | President | Clinton 67% - 23% |
| 2016 | Senate | Wyden 69% - 20% |
| 2016 | Governor (Spec.) | Brown 67% - 28% |
| 2016 | Attorney General | Rosenblum 71% - 25% |
| 2018 | Governor | Brown 68% - 28% |
| 2020 | President | Biden 72% - 25% |
| 2020 | Senate | Merkley 72% - 24% |
| 2020 | Secretary of State | Fagan 66% - 27% |
| 2020 | Treasurer | Read 67% - 26% |
| 2020 | Attorney General | Rosenblum 72% - 26% |
| 2022 | Senate | Wyden 71% - 25% |
| 2022 | Governor | Kotek 65% - 27% |
| 2024 | President | Harris 71% - 25% |
| 2024 | Secretary of State | Read 70% - 26% |
| 2024 | Treasurer | Steiner 64% - 27% |
| 2024 | Attorney General | Rayfield 71% - 29% |

== Recent election results ==
Sources (official results only):

- Elections History from the Oregon Secretary of State website
- Election Statistics from the website of the Clerk of the United States House of Representatives

=== 1994 ===
1994 United States House election: Oregon District 3
| Party | Candidate | Votes | % |
|---|---|---|---|
| Democratic | Ron Wyden (incumbent) | 161,624 | 72.54 |
| Republican | Everett Hall | 43,211 | 19.39 |
| Independent | Mark Brunelle | 13,550 | 6.08 |
| Libertarian | Gene Nanni | 4,164 | 1.87 |
| | Misc. | 273 | 0.12 |

=== 1996 special election ===
A special election was held on May 21, 1996 to fill the vacancy created when incumbent Ron Wyden resigned effective February 5, 1996 after winning a special election to the United States Senate. The winner of the election, Earl Blumenauer, served the remainder of Wyden's two-year term.

1996 United States House special election: Oregon District 3
| Party | Candidate | Votes | % |
|---|---|---|---|
| Democratic | Earl Blumenauer | 73,656 | 68.38 |
| Republican | Mark Brunelle | 26,735 | 24.82 |
| Pacific Green | Joe Keating | 4,336 | 4.03 |
| Socialist | Victoria P. Guillebeau | 2,452 | 2.28 |
| | Misc. | 529 | 0.49 |

=== 1996 ===
1996 United States House election: Oregon District 3
| Party | Candidate | Votes | % |
|---|---|---|---|
| Democratic | Earl Blumenauer (incumbent) | 165,922 | 66.93 |
| Republican | Scott Bruun | 65,259 | 26.32 |
| Pacific Green | Joe Keating | 9,274 | 3.74 |
| Libertarian | Bruce Alexander Knight | 4,474 | 1.80 |
| Socialist | Victoria P. Guillebeau | 2,449 | 0.99 |
| | Misc. | 531 | 0.21 |

=== 1998 ===
1998 United States House election: Oregon District 3
| Party | Candidate | Votes | % |
|---|---|---|---|
| Democratic | Earl Blumenauer (incumbent) | 153,889 | 83.64 |
| Libertarian | Bruce Alexander Knight | 16,930 | 9.23 |
| Socialist | Walter F. Brown | 10,199 | 5.56 |
| | Misc. | 2,333 | 1.27 |

=== 2000 ===
2000 United States House election: Oregon District 3
| Party | Candidate | Votes | % |
|---|---|---|---|
| Democratic | Earl Blumenauer (incumbent) | 181,049 | 66.77 |
| Republican | Jeffery L. Pollack | 64,128 | 23.65 |
| Pacific Green | Tre Arrow | 15,763 | 5.81 |
| Libertarian | Bruce Alexander Knight | 4,942 | 1.821 |
| Socialist | Walter F. Brown | 4,703 | 1.73 |
| | Misc. | 576 | 0.21 |

=== 2002 ===
2002 United States House election: Oregon District 3
| Party | Candidate | Votes | % |
|---|---|---|---|
| Democratic | Earl Blumenauer (incumbent) | 156,851 | 66.77 |
| Republican | Sarah Seale | 62,821 | 26.74 |
| Socialist | Walter F. Brown | 6,538 | 2.78 |
| Libertarian | Kevin Jones | 4,704 | 2.00 |
| Constitution | David Brownlow | 3,495 | 1.49 |
| | Misc. | 518 | 0.22 |

=== 2004 ===
2004 United States House election: Oregon District 3
| Party | Candidate | Votes | % |
|---|---|---|---|
| Democratic | Earl Blumenauer (incumbent) | 245,559 | 70.86 |
| Republican | Tami Mars | 82,045 | 23.67 |
| Socialist | Walter F. Brown | 10,678 | 3.08 |
| Constitution | Dale Winegarden | 7,119 | 2.05 |
| | Misc. | 1,159 | 0.33 |

=== 2006 ===
2006 United States House election: Oregon District 3
| Party | Candidate | Votes | % |
|---|---|---|---|
| Democratic | Earl Blumenauer (incumbent) | 186,380 | 73.49 |
| Republican | Bruce Broussard | 59,529 | 23.47 |
| Constitution | David Brownlow | 7,003 | 2.76 |
| | Misc. | 698 | 0.28 |

=== 2008 ===
2008 United States House election: Oregon District 3
| Party | Candidate | Votes | % |
|---|---|---|---|
| Democratic | Earl Blumenauer (incumbent) | 254,235 | 74.54 |
| Republican | Delia Lopez | 71,063 | 20.84 |
| Pacific Green | Michael Meo | 15,063 | 4.42 |
| | Misc. | 701 | 0.21 |

=== 2010 ===
2010 United States House election: Oregon District 3
| Party | Candidate | Votes | % |
|---|---|---|---|
| Democratic | Earl Blumenauer (incumbent) | 193,104 | 70.02 |
| Republican | Delia Lopez | 67,714 | 24.55 |
| Libertarian | Jeff Lawrence | 8,380 | 3.04 |
| Pacific Green | Michael Meo | 6,197 | 2.25 |
| | Misc. | 407 | 0.15 |

=== 2012 ===
2012 United States House election: Oregon District 3
| Party | Candidate | Votes | % |
|---|---|---|---|
| Democratic | Earl Blumenauer (incumbent) | 264,979 | 74.48 |
| Republican | Ronald Green | 70,235 | 19.74 |
| Libertarian | Michael Cline | 6,640 | 1.87 |
| Pacific Green | Woodrow Broadnax | 13,159 | 3.70 |
| | Misc. | 772 | 0.22 |

=== 2014 ===
2014 United States House election: Oregon District 3
| Party | Candidate | Votes | % |
|---|---|---|---|
| Democratic | Earl Blumenauer (incumbent) | 211,748 | 73.33 |
| Republican | James Buchal | 57,424 | 19.89 |
| Libertarian | Jeffrey J. Langan | 6,381 | 2.21 |
| Pacific Green | Michael Meo | 12,106 | 4.19 |
| | Misc. | 1,089 | 0.38 |

=== 2016 ===
2016 United States House election: Oregon District 3
| Party | Candidate | Votes | % |
|---|---|---|---|
| Democratic | Earl Blumenauer (incumbent) | 274,687 | 71.84 |
| Progressive | David Delk | 27,978 | 7.32 |
| Independent | David W. Walker | 78,154 | 20.44 |
| | Misc. | 1,536 | 0.40 |

=== 2018 ===
2018 United States House election: Oregon District 3
| Party | Candidate | Votes | % |
|---|---|---|---|
| Democratic | Earl Blumenauer (incumbent) | 279,019 | 72.6 |
| Republican | Tom Harrison | 76,187 | 19.8 |
| Independent | Marc Koller | 21,352 | 5.6 |
| Libertarian | Gary Dye | 5,767 | 1.5 |
| Constitution | Michael P. Marsh | 1,487 | 0.4 |
| | Misc. | 514 | 0.1 |

=== 2020 ===
2020 United States House election: Oregon District 3
| Party | Candidate | Votes | % |
|---|---|---|---|
| Democratic | Earl Blumenauer (incumbent) | 343,574 | 73.0 |
| Republican | Joanna Harbour | 110,570 | 23.5 |
| Pacific Green | Alex DiBlasi | 8,872 | 1.9 |
| Libertarian | Josh Solomon | 6,869 | 1.5 |
| | Misc. | 621 | 0.1 |

=== 2022 ===
2022 United States House election: Oregon District 3
| Party | Candidate | Votes | % |
|---|---|---|---|
| Democratic | Earl Blumenauer (incumbent) | 212,119 | 69.9 |
| Republican | Joanna Harbour | 79,766 | 26.3 |
| Pacific Green | David E Delk | 10,982 | 3.6 |
| Write-in | | 467 | 0.2 |

=== 2024 ===
2024 United States House election: Oregon District 3
| Party | Candidate | Votes | % |
|---|---|---|---|
| Democratic | Maxine Dexter | 226,405 | 67.7 |
| Republican | Joanna Harbour | 84,344 | 25.2 |
| Independent | David W Walker | 10,245 | 3.1 |
| Pacific Green | Joe Meyer | 10,106 | 3.0 |
| Constitution | David K Frosch | 2,459 | 0.7 |
| Write-in | | 810 | 0.2 |
| Total votes | | 334,369 | 100% |

== Historical district boundaries ==
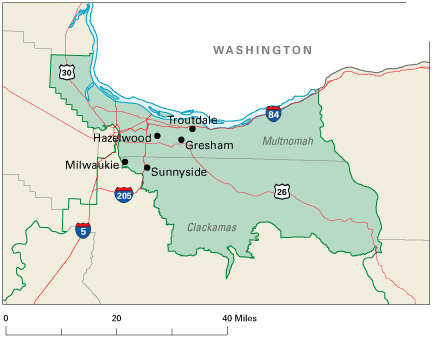
2003 - 2013

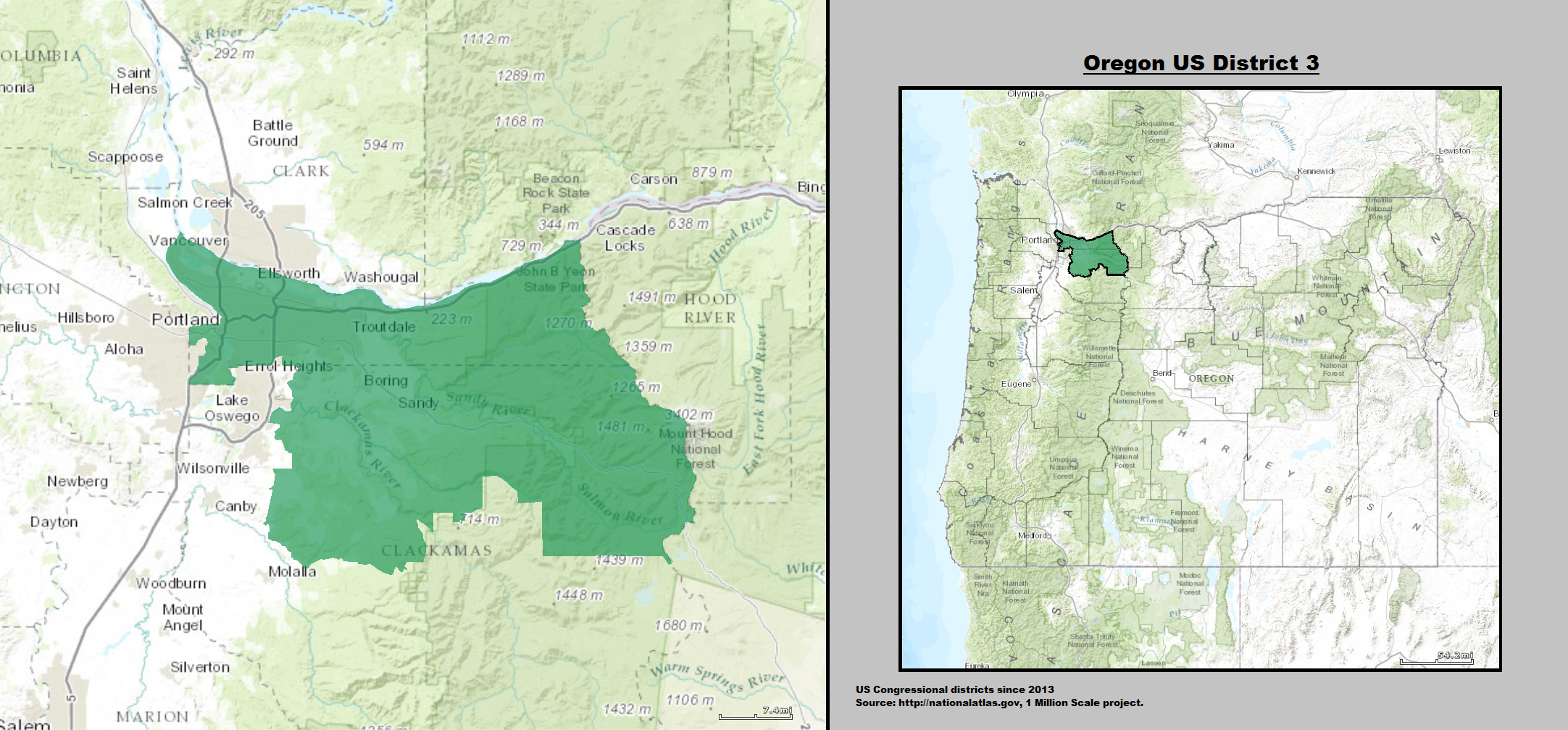
2013 - 2023

Before the 2002 redistricting, the whole of Multnomah County was included in the district; it lost southwest Portland to the 1st and 5th districts, but it gained most of its current portion of Clackamas County.

== See also ==
- Oregon's congressional districts
- List of United States congressional districts
