= Kistner =

Kistner is a German occupational surname from kistener, 'box maker, carpenter'. Notable people with the surname include:

- Karl Kistner (1929–2008), German boxer
- Robert Kistner (1917–1990), American gynecologist

== See also ==
- Charles Kistner Pringle (1931–2024), American politician
- Dr. Frank B. Kistner House, a house located in southwest Portland, Oregon
