= Franklin F. Korell =

American politician

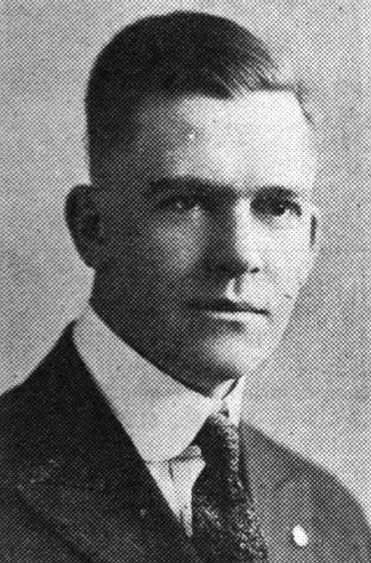
- From the January 1, 1921 edition of the Oregon Voter magazine

Member of the U.S. House of Representatives from Oregon's 3rd district
- In office October 18, 1927 – March 3, 1931
- Preceded by: Maurice E. Crumpacker
- Succeeded by: Charles H. Martin

Member of the Oregon House of Representatives
- In office 1921–1923

Personal details
- Born: Franklin Frederick Korell; July 23, 1889 Portland, Oregon, US
- Died: June 7, 1965 (aged 75) Alexandria, Virginia, US
- Resting place: Arlington National Cemetery
- Party: Republican
- Spouse: Caroline Stoddard

Franklin Frederick Korell (July 23, 1889 – June 7, 1965) was an attorney, World War I veteran, and United States Congressman who represented the U.S. state of Oregon for two terms from 1927 to 1931.

== Early life ==
Korell was born in Portland, Oregon, the son of Charles H. and Frances Barrol Korrell; his father was a Danish immigrant. He attended the local public schools and the Bishop Scott Academy in Portland. In 1910, he earned a Bachelor of Laws degree from University of Oregon and was admitted to the Oregon State Bar that same year. He attended Yale Law School from 1911 to 1912, and returned to Portland to open his law practice.

== Military service ==
During World War I, Korell served as a first lieutenant and captain in the 12th Infantry Regiment of the 8th Infantry Division and in the 16th Infantry Division from August 1917 to March 1919.

== Political career ==
Following his military service, Korell returned to his law practice in Portland. In 1921, he was elected to the Oregon House of Representatives and served one two-year term.

=== Congress ===
In 1927, Korell, a Republican, won election to the United States House of Representatives, defeating Democrat Elton Watkins in a special election to fill the vacancy caused by the suicide of Maurice E. Crumpacker. Korell was easily re-elected to a full term over William C. Culbertson in 1928.

In 1930, Korell again ran for re-election, but faced several difficulties. First, the Wall Street crash of 1929 had made a difficult environment for incumbents in general and for Republicans in particular. Secondly, in Oregon, the Republican party was in disarray. George W. Joseph had won the Republican gubernatorial primary running on a populist message that included public development of hydroelectric power along the Columbia River. But Joseph died prior to the general election, and party leaders chose Phil Metschan, Jr., who opposed public power utilities. Joseph's friend and business partner Julius Meier picked up Joseph's platform and ran what would be a successful independent campaign that split the Republican party. Amid all this turmoil, Korell lost to Democrat Charles H. Martin by a margin of 55% to 40%.

== After Congress ==
Korell remained in Washington served as special assistant to the general counsel of the United States Treasury Department from 1931 to 1943 and in the chief counsel's office of the Bureau of the Internal Revenue Service from 1943 to 1959. In 1932, he married Caroline Stoddard, the former wife of Brigadier General Billy Mitchell.

=== Death and burial ===
He lived in Alexandria, Virginia until his death there on June 7, 1965. He was interred in Arlington National Cemetery.

U.S. House of Representatives
| Preceded by Maurice E. Crumpacker | Member of the U.S. House of Representatives from Oregon's 3rd congressional district October 18, 1927 – March 3, 1931 | Succeeded by Charles H. Martin |
