= Maurice Crumpacker House =

House in Multnomah County, Oregon, U.S.

- U.S. National Register of Historic Places
- Portland Historic Landmark
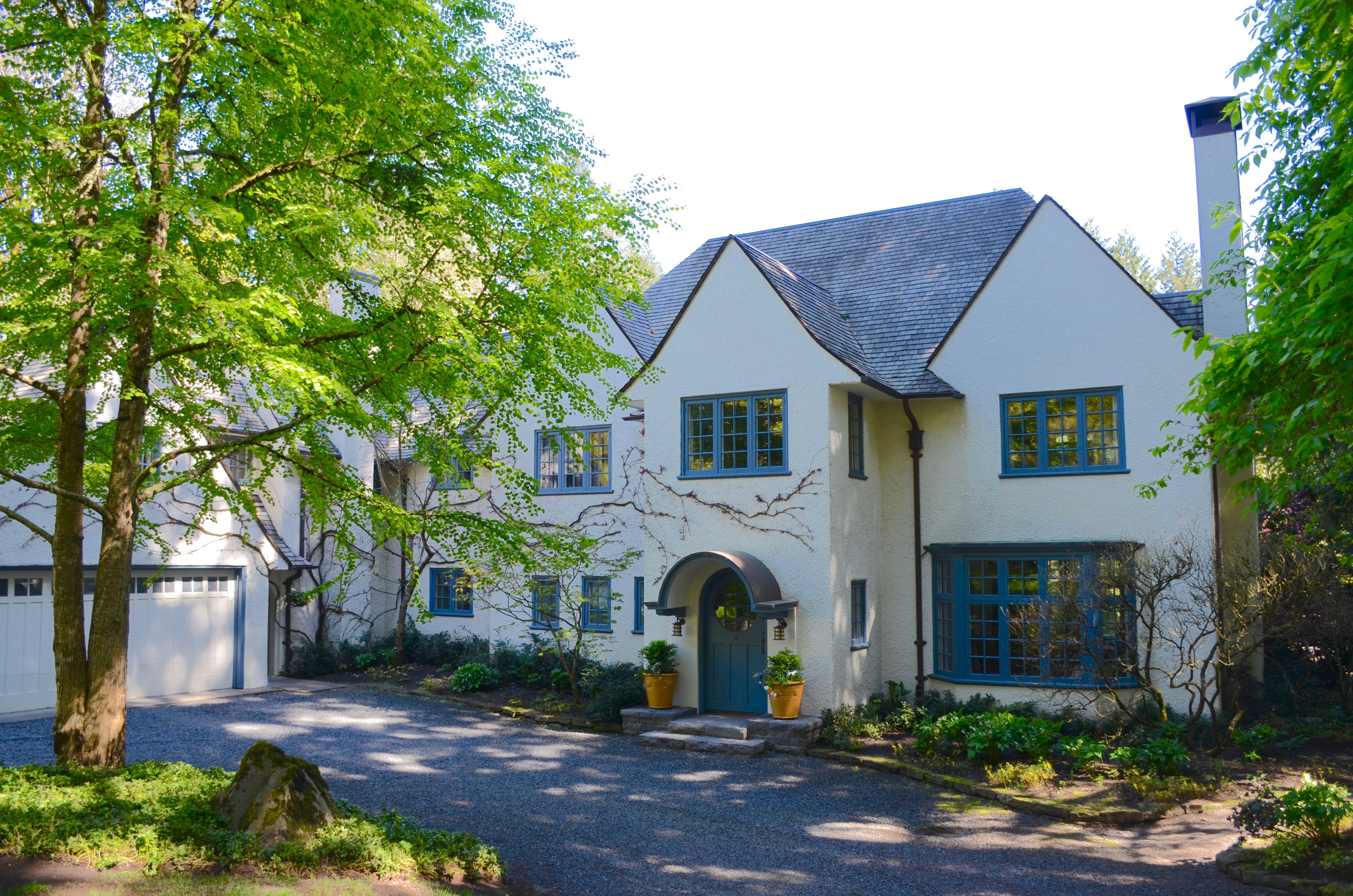
- The Crumpacker House in 2016
- Location: 12714 SW Iron Mountain Boulevard; Portland, Oregon
- Coordinates: 45°25′59″N 122°39′30″W
- Built: 1923
- Architect: Wade Hampton Pipes
- Architectural style: Tudor revival
- NRHP reference No.: 92001378
- Added to NRHP: October 23, 1992

The Maurice Crumpacker House is the former residence of Maurice E. Crumpacker, a popular Oregon attorney and United States Congressman in the 1920s.

The house was built by Portland architect Wade Hampton Pipes in 1923, and is located in the Dunthorpe neighborhood of Multnomah County, Oregon, just outside the Portland municipal boundary. It was added to the National Register of Historic Places in 1992.
