= Dr. Noble Wiley Jones House =

Historic building in Portland, Oregon, U.S.

- U.S. National Register of Historic Places
- Portland Historic Landmark
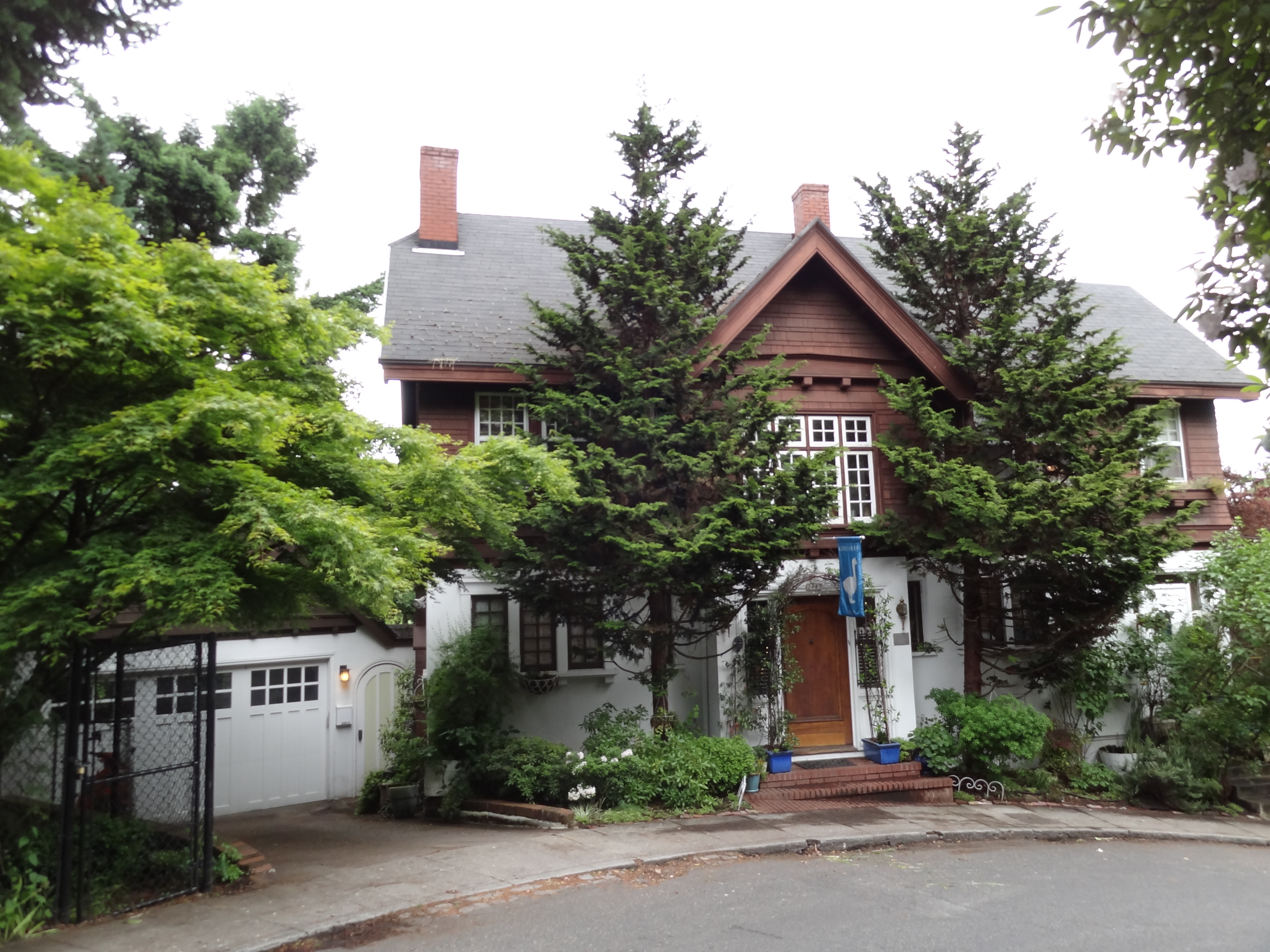

- Location within Portland, Oregon
- Location: 2187 SW Market Street Drive; Portland, Oregon
- Coordinates: 45°31′07″N 122°41′49″W
- Area: less than one acre
- Built: 1911
- Architect: Wade Hampton Pipes (house possibly; garage confirmed)
- Architectural style: English Arts and Crafts
- NRHP reference No.: 88000088
- Added to NRHP: February 11, 1988

The Dr. Noble Wiley Jones House is a house located in the Goose Hollow neighborhood of southwest Portland, Oregon. Built in 1911, the house was listed on the National Register of Historic Places in 1988.

The house was built for Dr. Noble Wiley Jones and his wife, Nellie Sturtevant Jones. A graduate of Stanford and Rush Medical College (then affiliated with the University of Chicago), Jones studied medicine in Europe for several years before settling in Portland in 1906 as the city's first specialist in internal medicine. In 1913, he was hired as a Clinical Associate in Medicine at the University of Oregon Medical School (now Oregon Health & Science University) and is considered one of the leaders who helped increase the reputation of the fledgling institution.

Jones chose the location for the home at the corner of Market Street Drive and Vista Drive, adjacent to Tanner Creek Canyon, then spanned by Ford Street Bridge (later replaced by the Vista Bridge in 1926).

According to interviews conducted with Jones's son Dr. Orville Jones, the architect of the house was noted Portland architect Wade Hampton Pipes. The house is built in the English Arts and Crafts style favored by Pipes, but it differs from Pipes' usual style, and there is debate that this house may not be his work. The garage was clearly designed by Pipes to complement the house.

Jones sold the house to his partner, Dr. Blair Holcomb, in 1927, and the house is sometimes called the Jones–Holcomb Residence. The house remains a private residence today.

Noble Wiley Jones house historical report

== See also ==
- National Register of Historic Places listings in Southwest Portland, Oregon
