= George Pipes House =

Historic building in Portland, Oregon, U.S.

- U.S. National Register of Historic Places
- Portland Historic Landmark
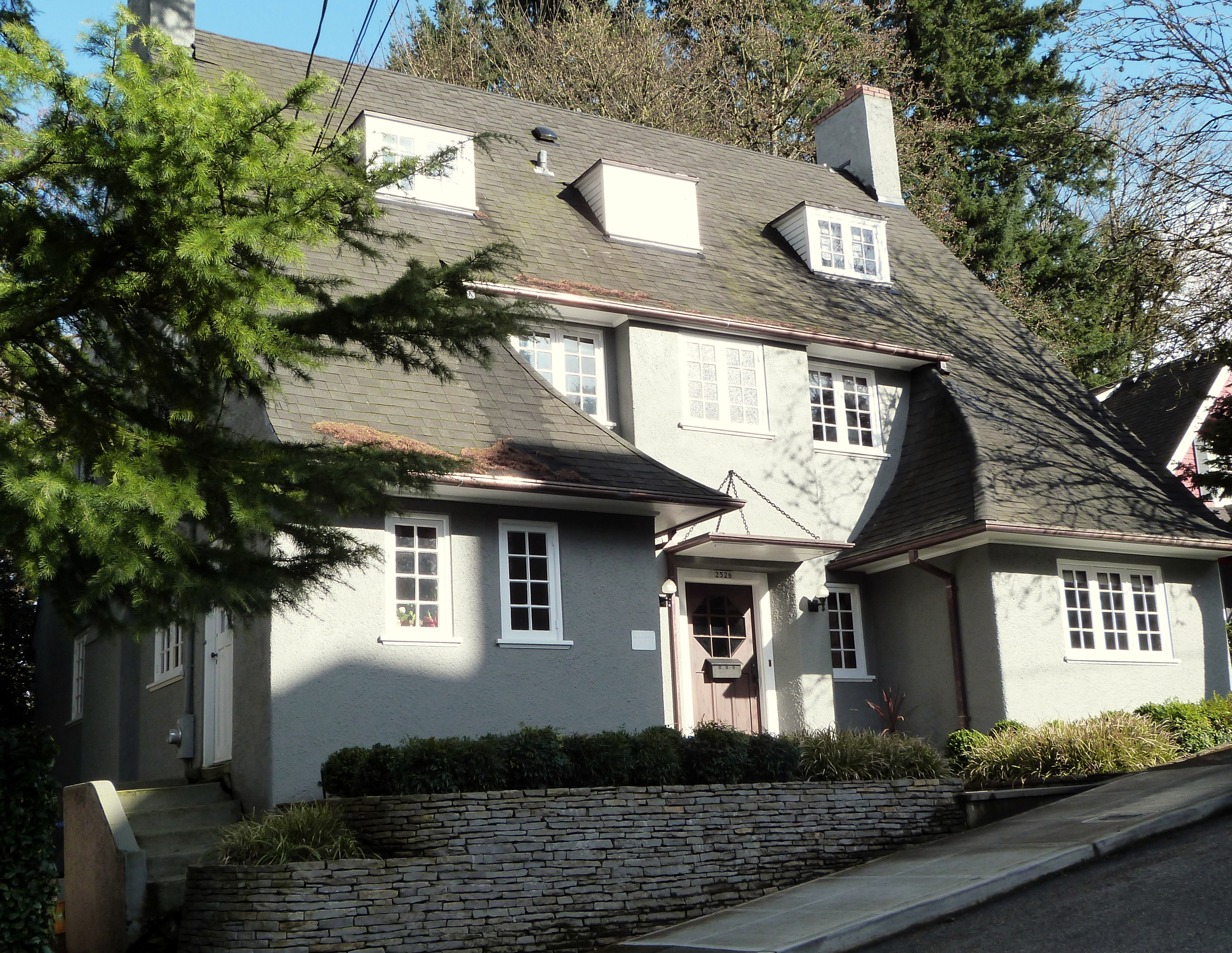
- The George Pipes House in 2013.

- Location within Portland, Oregon
- Location: 2526 SW St. Helen's Court; Portland, Oregon
- Coordinates: 45.509767°N 122.701639°W
- Area: 0.1 acres (0.040 ha)
- Built: 1923
- Architect: Wade Hampton Pipes
- Architectural style: English Cottage
- NRHP reference No.: 91000131
- Added to NRHP: February 22, 1991

The George Pipes House is a house located in southwest Portland, Oregon listed on the National Register of Historic Places.

== See also ==
- National Register of Historic Places listings in Southwest Portland, Oregon
