= 2004 United States House of Representatives elections in Oregon =

- November 2, 2004

All 5 Oregon seats to the United States House of Representatives
	Majority party	Minority party
Party	Democratic	Republican
Last election	4	1
Seats won	4	1
Seat change	Steady	Steady
Popular vote	951,688	761,545
Percentage	53.70%	42.97%
Swing	▼0.88%	▲0.32%

Democratic
40–50%
50–60%
60–70%
70–80%
Republican
40–50%
60–70%
70–80%
80–90%

The 2004 United States House of Representatives elections in Oregon were held on November 2, 2004, to select Oregon's representatives to the United States House of Representatives. All five seats were up for election in 2004, as they are every two years. All five incumbents were re-elected, four of them by large margins; only the 5th district was somewhat competitive.

== Overview ==
United States House of Representatives elections in Oregon, 2004
Party	Votes	Percentage	Seats	+/–
Democratic	951,688	53.70%	4	—
Republican	761,545	42.97%	1	—
Constitution (Oregon)	29,831	1.68%		—
Libertarian	14,445	0.82%		—
Socialist (Oregon)	10,678	0.60%		—
write-ins	4,119	0.23%		—
Totals	1,772,306	100%	5	—

== District 1 ==
2004 Oregon's 1st congressional district election
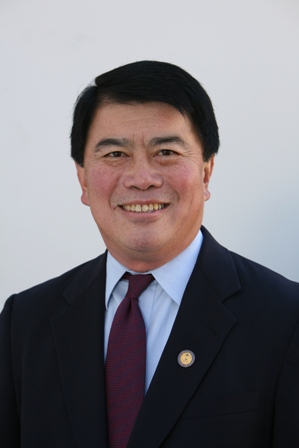

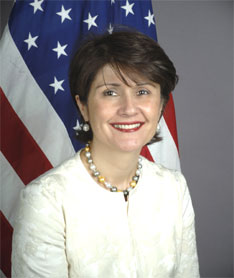
Nominee	David Wu	Goli Ameri
Party	Democratic	Republican
Popular vote	203,771	135,164
Percentage	57.5%	38.1%
- County results Wu: 40–50% 50–60% 60–70% 70–80%
U.S. Representative before election
David Wu
Democratic
Elected U.S. Representative
David Wu
Democratic

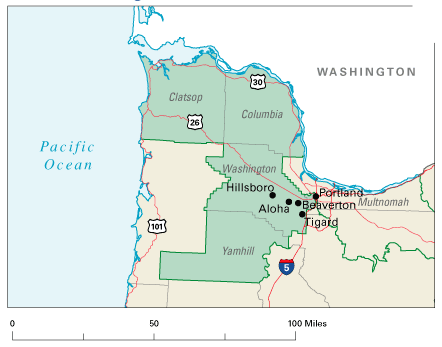

=== Democratic primary ===
==== Results ====
Democratic Primary results
Party	Candidate	Votes	%
Democratic	David Wu (incumbent)	62,001	98.99
	write-ins	631	1.01
Total votes		62,632	100

=== Republican primary ===
==== Results ====
Republican Primary results
Party	Candidate	Votes	%
Republican	Goli Ameri	26,451	48.22
Republican	Jason D.C. Meshed	14,495	26.43
Republican	Tim Phillips	13,316	24.28
	write-ins	591	1.08
Total votes		54,853	100

=== General election ===
==== Predictions ====
Source	Ranking	As of
The Cook Political Report	Lean D	October 29, 2004
Sabato's Crystal Ball	Lean D	November 1, 2004

==== Results ====
Oregon's 1st congressional district election, 2004
Party	Candidate	Votes	%
Democratic	David Wu (incumbent)	203,771	57.51
Republican	Goli Ameri	135,164	38.15
Constitution	Dean Wolf	13,882	3.92
	write-ins	1,521	0.43
Total votes		354,338	100
Democratic hold			

== District 2 ==
2004 Oregon's 2nd congressional district election
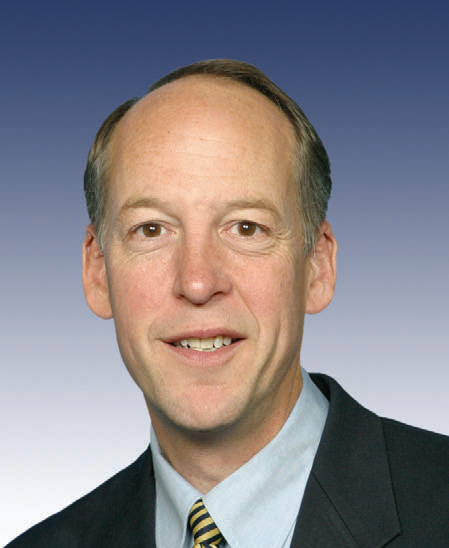

Nominee	Greg Walden	John C. McColgan
Party	Republican	Democratic
Popular vote	248,461	88,914
Percentage	72.5%	25.9%
- County results Walden: 60–70% 70–80% 80–90%
U.S. Representative before election
Greg Walden
Republican
Elected U.S. Representative
Greg Walden
Republican

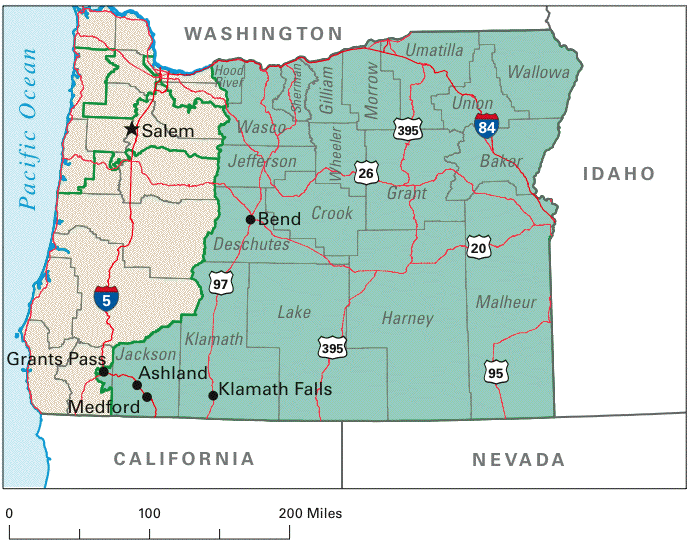

=== Democratic primary ===
==== Results ====
Democratic Primary results
Party	Candidate	Votes	%
Democratic	John C. McColgan	45,521	97.86
	write-ins	997	2.14
Total votes		46,518	100

=== Republican primary ===
==== Results ====
Republican Primary results
Party	Candidate	Votes	%
Republican	Greg Walden (incumbent)	79,686	99.32
	write-ins	549	0.68
Total votes		80,235	100

=== General election ===
==== Predictions ====
Source	Ranking	As of
The Cook Political Report	Safe R	October 29, 2004
Sabato's Crystal Ball	Safe R	November 1, 2004

==== Results ====
Oregon's 2nd congressional district election, 2004
Party	Candidate	Votes	%
Republican	Greg Walden (incumbent)	248,461	72.48
Democratic	John C. McColgan	88,914	25.94
Libertarian	Jim Lindsay	4,792	1.40
Constitution	Jack Alan Brown, Jr.	4,060	1.18
	write-ins	638	0.19
Total votes		342,805	100
Republican hold			

== District 3 ==
2004 Oregon's 3rd congressional district election
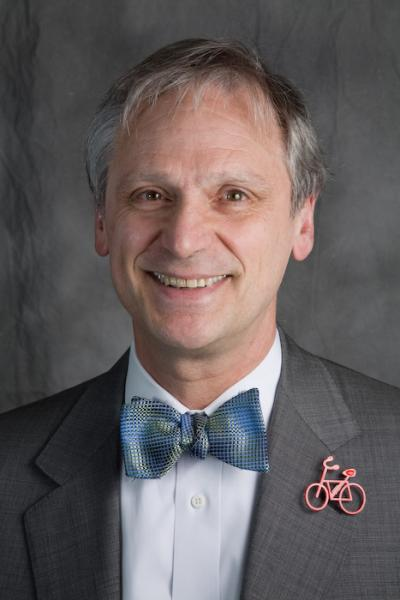

Nominee	Earl Blumenauer	Tami Mars
Party	Democratic	Republican
Popular vote	245,559	82,045
Percentage	70.9%	23.7%
- County results Blumenauer: 50–60% 70–80%
U.S. Representative before election
Earl Blumenauer
Democratic
Elected U.S. Representative
Earl Blumenauer
Democratic

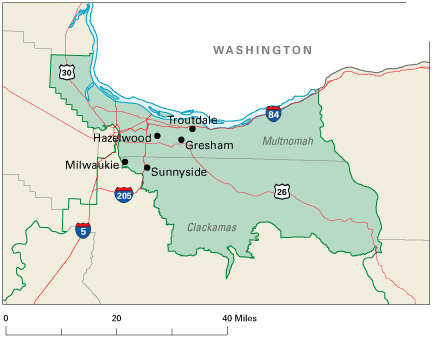

=== Democratic primary ===
==== Results ====
Democratic Primary results
Party	Candidate	Votes	%
Democratic	Earl Blumenauer (incumbent)	76,811	89.01
Democratic	John Sweeney	9,207	10.67
	write-ins	280	0.32
Total votes		86,298	100

=== Republican primary ===
==== Results ====
Republican Primary results
Party	Candidate	Votes	%
Republican	Tami Mars	21,572	94.01
	write-ins	1,374	5.99
Total votes		22,946	100

=== General election ===
==== Predictions ====
Source	Ranking	As of
The Cook Political Report	Safe D	October 29, 2004
Sabato's Crystal Ball	Safe D	November 1, 2004

==== Results ====
Oregon's 3rd congressional district election, 2004
Party	Candidate	Votes	%
Democratic	Earl Blumenauer (incumbent)	245,559	70.86
Republican	Tami Mars	82,045	23.67
Socialist	Walter F. "Walt" Brown	10,678	3.08
Constitution	Dale Winegarden	7,119	2.05
	write-ins	1,159	0.33
Total votes		346,560	100
Democratic hold			

== District 4 ==
2004 Oregon's 4th congressional district election
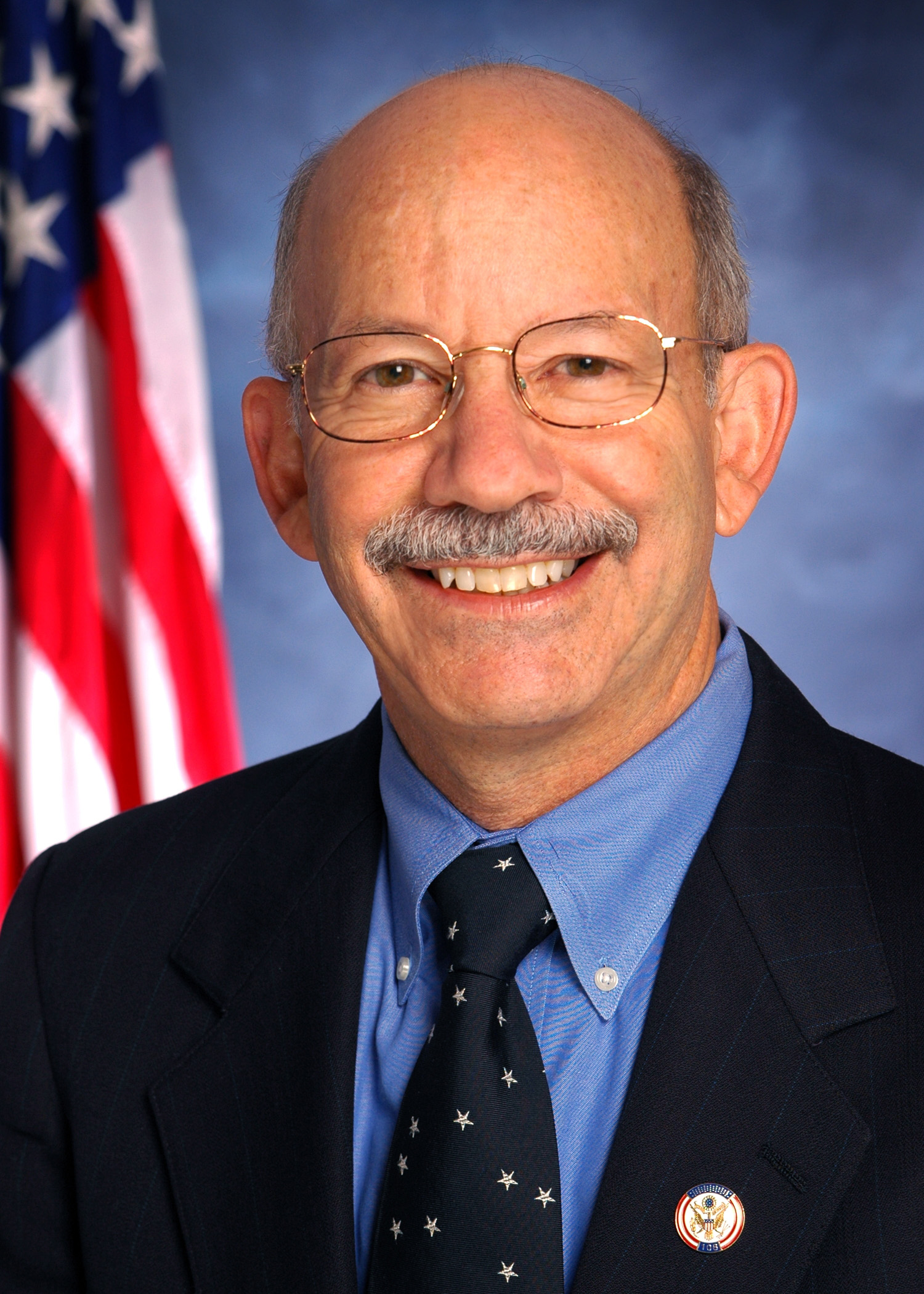

Nominee	Peter A. DeFazio	Jim Feldkamp
Party	Democratic	Republican
Popular vote	228,611	140,882
Percentage	61.0%	37.6%
- County results Defazio: 40–50% 50–60% 60–70% Feldkamp: 40–50%
U.S. Representative before election
Peter A. DeFazio
Democratic
Elected U.S. Representative
Peter A. DeFazio
Democratic

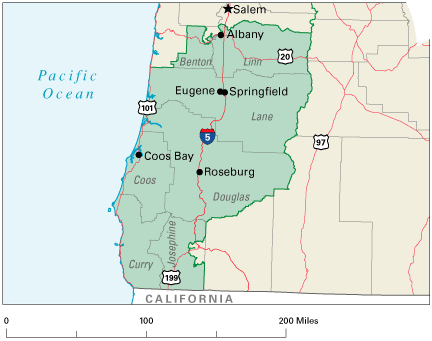

=== Democratic primary ===
==== Results ====
Democratic Primary results
Party	Candidate	Votes	%
Democratic	Peter A. DeFazio (incumbent)	78,414	99.23
	write-ins	610	0.77
Total votes		79,024	100

=== Republican primary ===
==== Results ====
Republican Primary results
Party	Candidate	Votes	%
Republican	Jim Feldkamp	51,500	97.75
	write-ins	1,183	2.25
Total votes		52,683	100

=== General election ===
==== Predictions ====
Source	Ranking	As of
The Cook Political Report	Safe D	October 29, 2004
Sabato's Crystal Ball	Safe D	November 1, 2004

==== Results ====
Oregon's 4th congressional district election, 2004
Party	Candidate	Votes	%
Democratic	Peter A. DeFazio (incumbent)	228,611	60.98
Republican	Jim Feldkamp	140,882	37.58
Libertarian	Jacob Boone	3,190	0.85
Constitution	Michael Paul Marsh	1,799	0.48
	write-ins	427	0.11
Total votes		374,909	100
Democratic hold			

== District 5 ==
2004 Oregon's 5th congressional district election
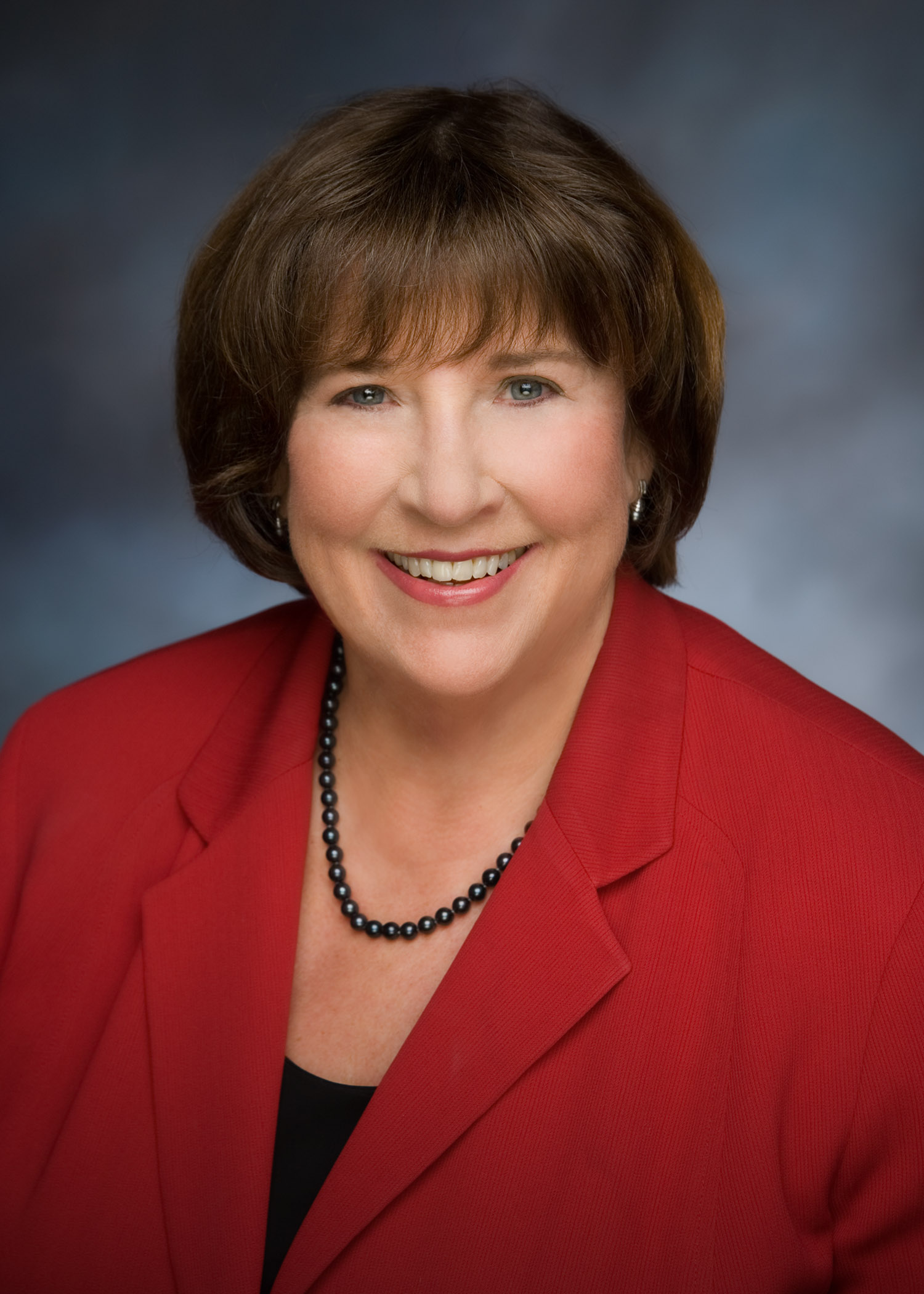

Nominee	Darlene Hooley	Jim Zupancic
Party	Democratic	Republican
Popular vote	184,833	154,993
Percentage	52.9%	44.3%
- County results Hooley: 40–50% 50–60% 60–70%
U.S. Representative before election
Darlene Hooley
Democratic
Elected U.S. Representative
Darlene Hooley
Democratic

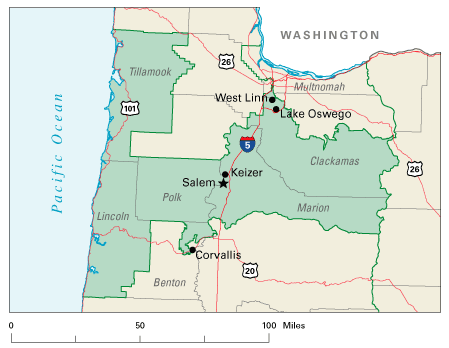

=== Democratic primary ===
==== Results ====
Democratic Primary results
Party	Candidate	Votes	%
Democratic	Darlene Hooley (incumbent)	59,407	85.11
Democratic	Andrew Kaza	10,027	14.37
	write-ins	366	0.52
Total votes		69,800	100

=== Republican primary ===
==== Results ====
Republican Primary results
Party	Candidate	Votes	%
Republican	Jim Zupancic	37,856	59.33
Republican	Jackie Winters	25,529	40.01
	write-ins	426	0.67
Total votes		63,811	100

=== General election ===
==== Predictions ====
Source	Ranking	As of
The Cook Political Report	Likely D	October 29, 2004
Sabato's Crystal Ball	Safe D	November 1, 2004

==== Results ====
Oregon's 5th congressional district election, 2004
Party	Candidate	Votes	%
Democratic	Darlene Hooley (incumbent)	184,833	52.86
Republican	Jim Zupancic	154,993	44.33
Libertarian	Jerry Defoe	6,463	1.85
Constitution	Joseph H. Bitz	2,971	0.85
	write-ins	374	0.11
Total votes		349,634	100
Democratic hold			

== See also ==
- United States House of Representatives elections, 2004
- United States presidential election in Oregon, 2004
- United States Senate election in Oregon, 2004
- Oregon state elections, 2004
