= John M. and Elizabeth Bates House No. 4 =

Historic house in Oregon, United States

- U.S. National Register of Historic Places
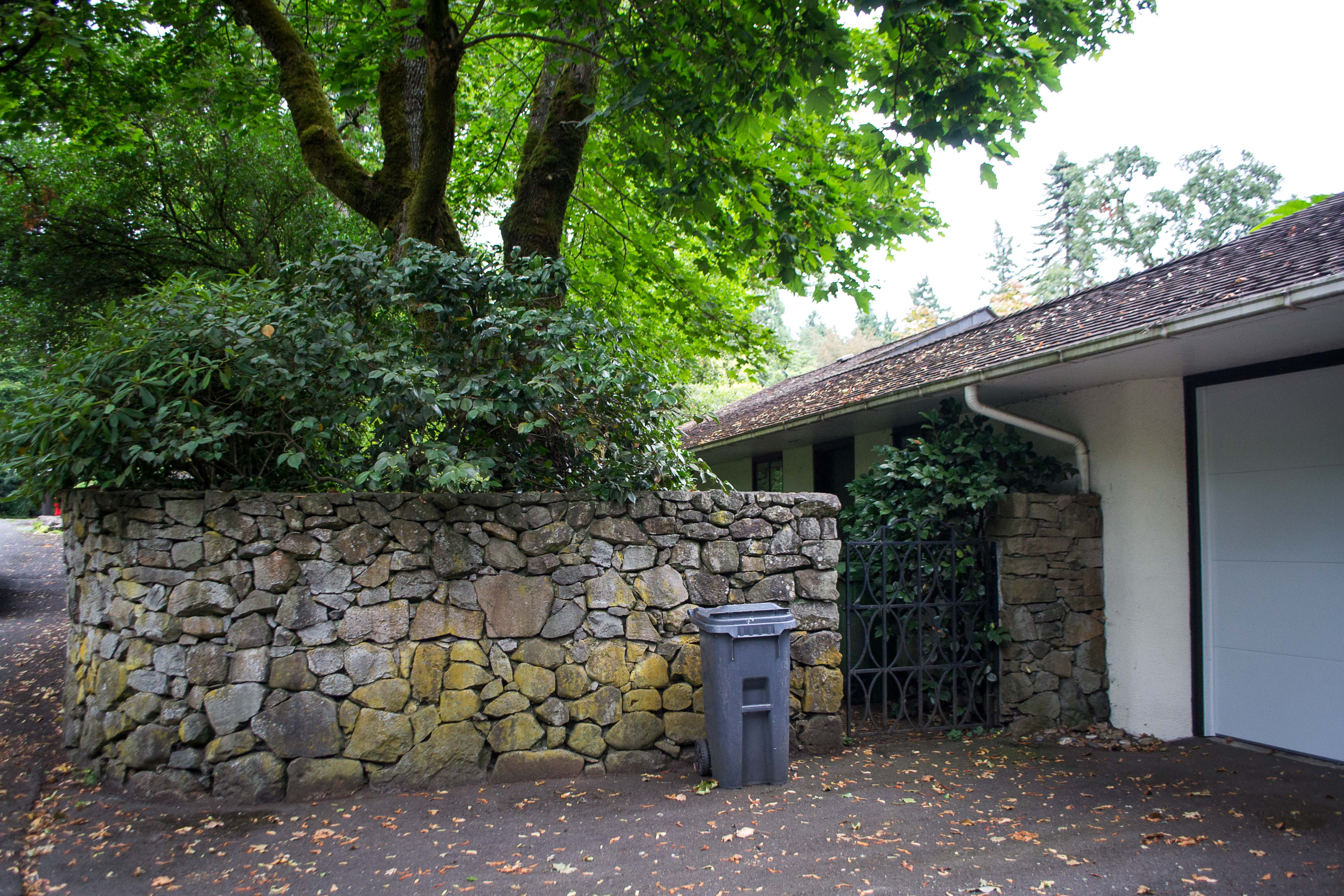
- The Bates House in 2013

- Location within Oregon
- Location: 4101 Southshore Boulevard; Lake Oswego, Oregon
- Coordinates: 45°24′16″N 122°43′05″W
- Area: 0.9 acres (0.36 ha)
- Built: 1954
- Architect: Wade Hampton Pipes
- Architectural style: Arts and Crafts, Northwest Regional
- MPS: Wade Pipes Residences for John and Elizabeth Bates MPS
- NRHP reference No.: 90000832
- Added to NRHP: June 13, 1990

The John M. and Elizabeth Bates House No. 4 is a historic house in Lake Oswego, Oregon, United States. It is the fourth and final residence designed by architect Wade Pipes (1877–1961) for his friends John and Elizabeth Bates, and the penultimate and finest commission of his career. In it, Pipes designed not only the building but also the landscape, furnishings, and interior finishes, representing the culmination of his work as a pivotal figure in the Arts and Crafts movement in Oregon, while also giving a nod to the Northwest Regional style. Built in 1954 on a lot fronting Oswego Lake, it is distinguished by clean, flowing lines, attention to its setting, a rubblestone wall buffering it from the nearby street, one of Pipes' signature bay windows, a central courtyard, and other features.

The house was added to the National Register of Historic Places in 1990. By 2018, most of the house's significant features were either significantly deteriorated or gone altogether, including the complete loss of Pipes' custom furniture and built-ins. This loss of integrity prompted the owner to petition for it to be removed from the National Register.

== See also ==
- National Register of Historic Places listings in Clackamas County, Oregon
- John M. and Elizabeth Bates House No. 1
