= Wade Hampton Pipes =

- Born: July 31, 1877; Independence, Oregon
- Died: July 1, 1961 (aged 83); Oregon
- Occupation: Architect

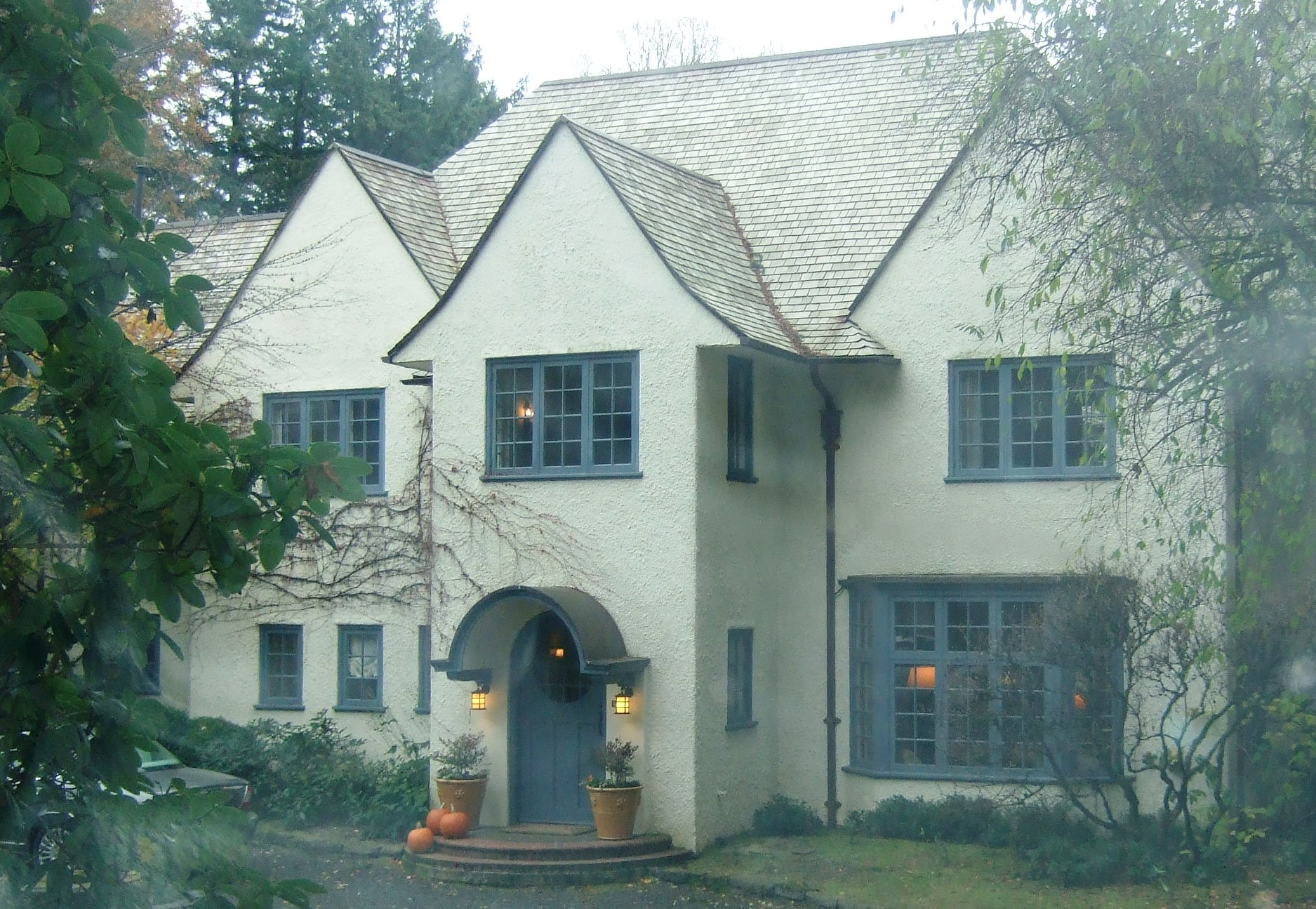
Maurice Crumpacker House

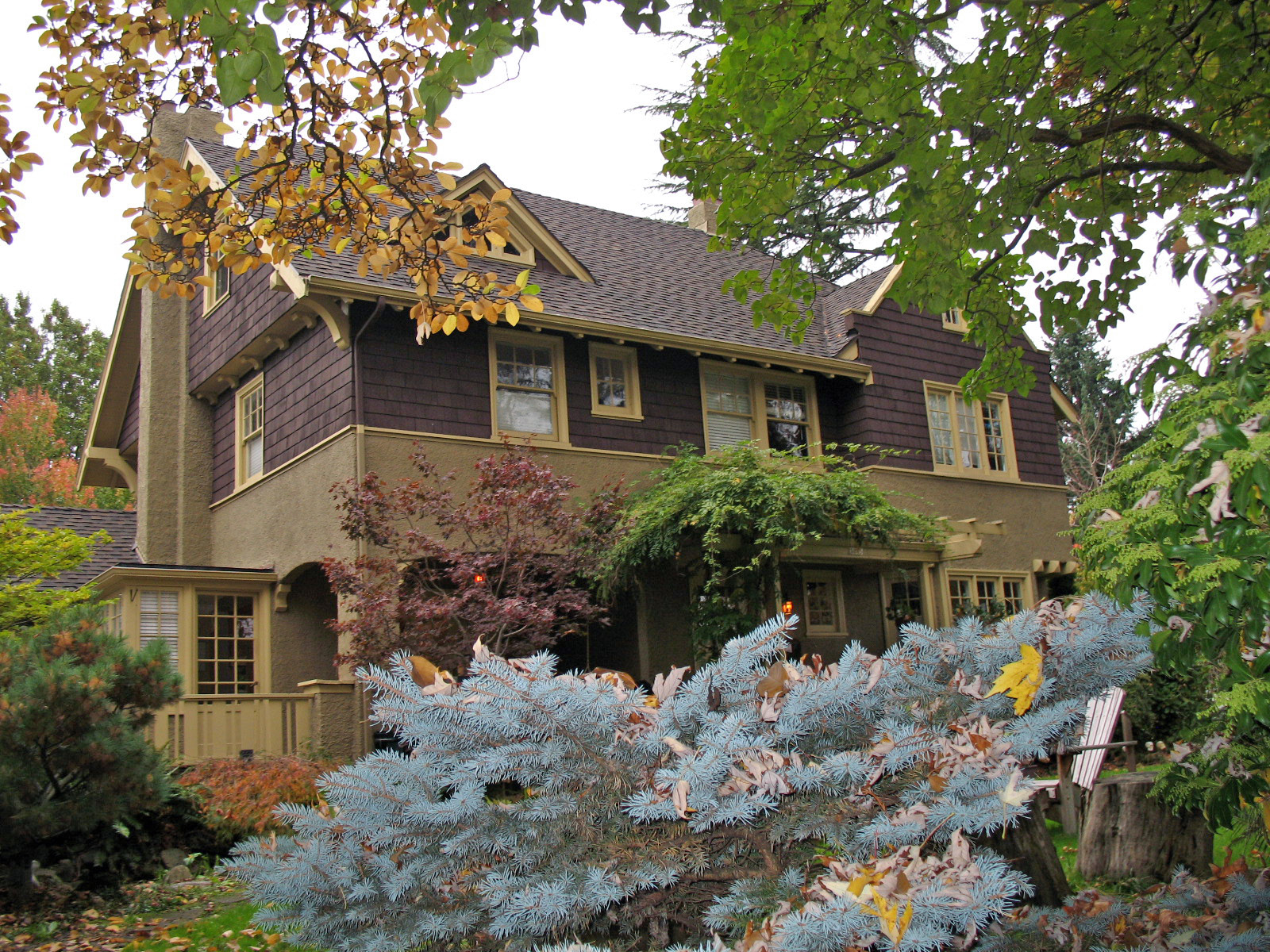
Pipes Family House

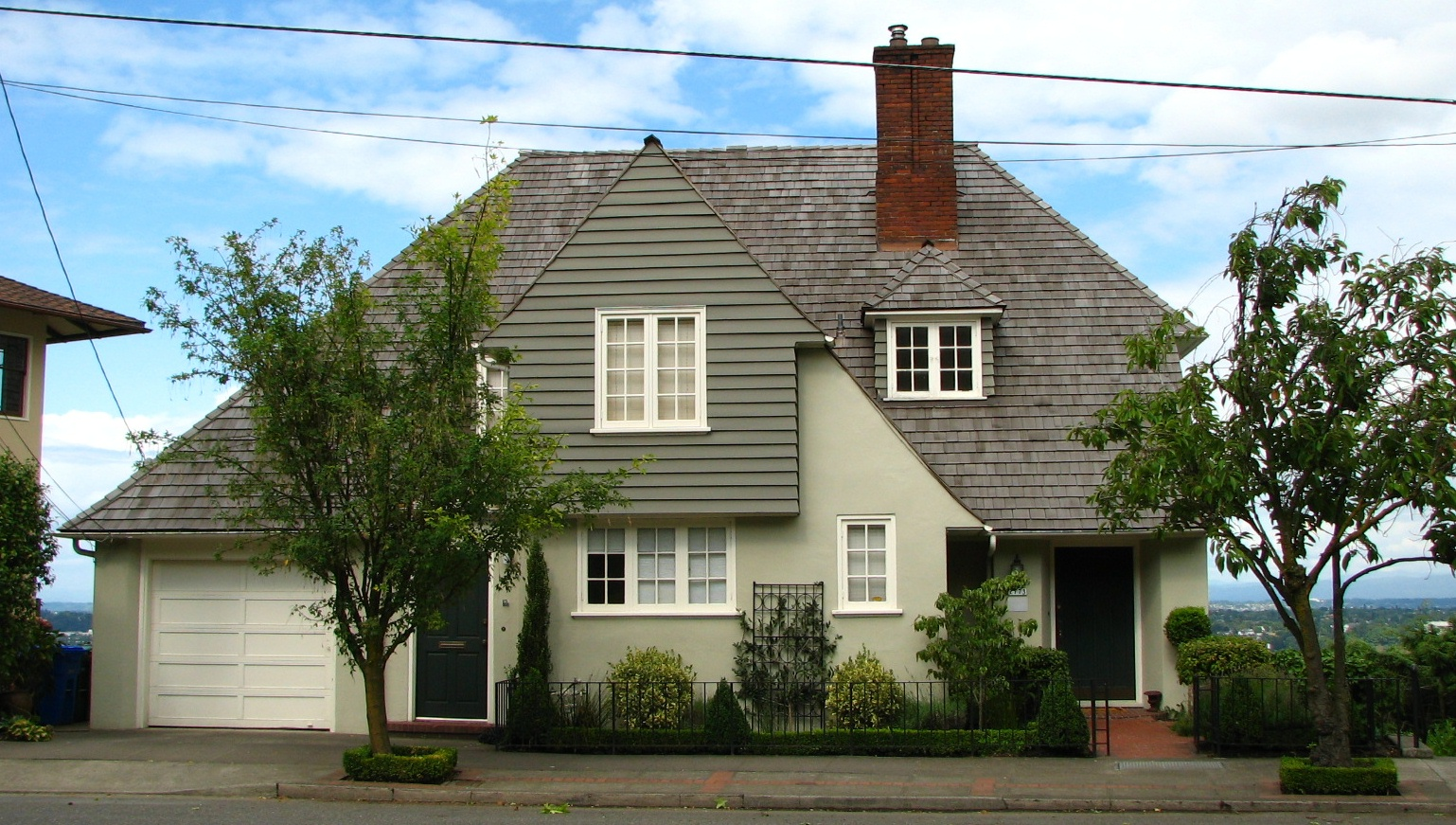
Elizabeth Ducey House

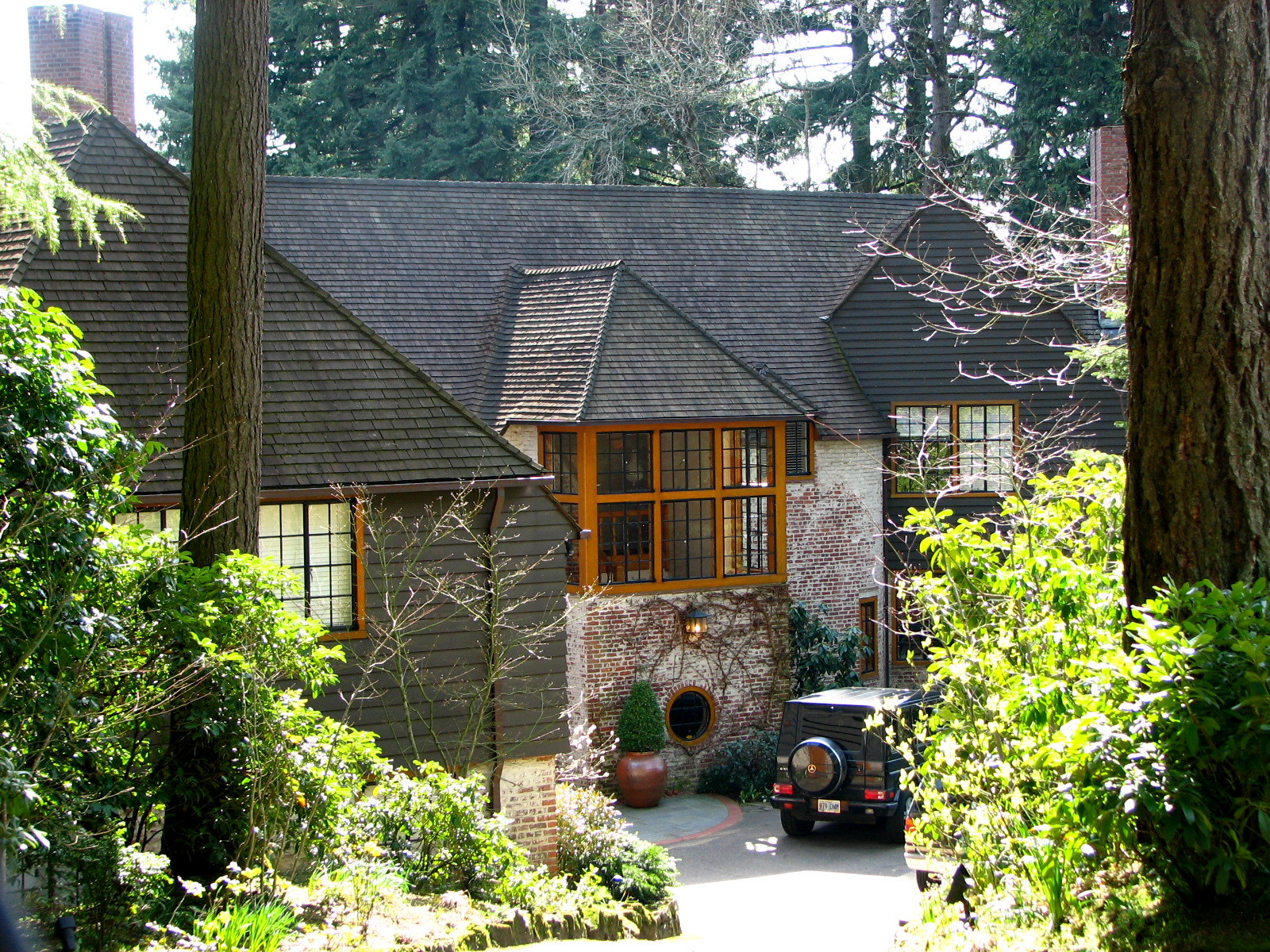
Dr. Frank B. Kistner House

Wade Hampton Pipes (July 31, 1877 – July 1, 1961) was an American architect in based in Portland, Oregon. Pipes was considered the "foremost exponent of English Cottage architecture" in the state.

== Career ==
Pipes admired the work of English architect Sir Edwin Landseer Lutyens, and was also influenced by C. F. A. Voysey. He designed in the Arts and Crafts style. In his fifty-year career, he designed some 70 residences. Many of his works are listed on the National Register of Historic Places (NRHP). In 1926, Pipes designed and a Tudor Revival style home in Southwest Portland for his father, judge Martin L. Pipes. The house is listed on the NRHP as the Martin Luther Pipes House. He also designed houses for naturalist William L. Finley, congressman Maurice Crumpacker, and author Lewis A. McArthur.

== Personal life ==
Pipes was born on July 31, 1877, in Independence, Oregon.

Pietro Belluschi described him as "an elegantly dressed man in English tweeds".

Pipes died on July 1, 1961, having spent his entire life in Oregon except for his period of study in England.

== Education ==
From 1907 to 1911, Pipes studied at the Central School of Arts and Crafts in London, England.

== Works on the NRHP ==
- John M. and Elizabeth Bates House No. 1, 1837 SW Edgewood Rd, Portland
- John M. and Elizabeth Bates House No. 2, 16948 SW Bryant Rd, Lake Oswego
- John M. and Elizabeth Bates House No. 3, 16884 SW Bryant Rd, Lake Oswego
- John M. and Elizabeth Bates House No. 4, 4101 South Shore Blvd, Lake Oswego
- Maurice Crumpacker House, 12714 SW Iron Mountain Blvd, Portland
- Marshall Dana House, 15725 SE Dana Ave, Milwaukie
- Elizabeth Ducey House, 2773 NW Westover Rd, Portland
- Bertha M. and Marie A. Green House, 2610 SW Vista Ave, Portland
- Dr. Noble Wiley Jones House, 2187 SW Market Street Dr, Portland
- Dr. Frank B. Kistner House, 5400 SW Hewett Blvd, Portland
- Pipes Family House, 3045 NE 9th Ave, Portland
- George Pipes House, 2526 St Helens Court, Portland
- Martin Luther Pipes House, 2675 SW Vista Ave, Portland
- Sherrard–Fenton House, 13100 SW Riverside Dr, Lake Oswego
- Walter S. Zimmerman House, 1840 SW Hawthorne Terrace, Portland
