= Walter S. Zimmerman House =

Historic building in Portland, Oregon, U.S.

- U.S. National Register of Historic Places
- Portland Historic Landmark
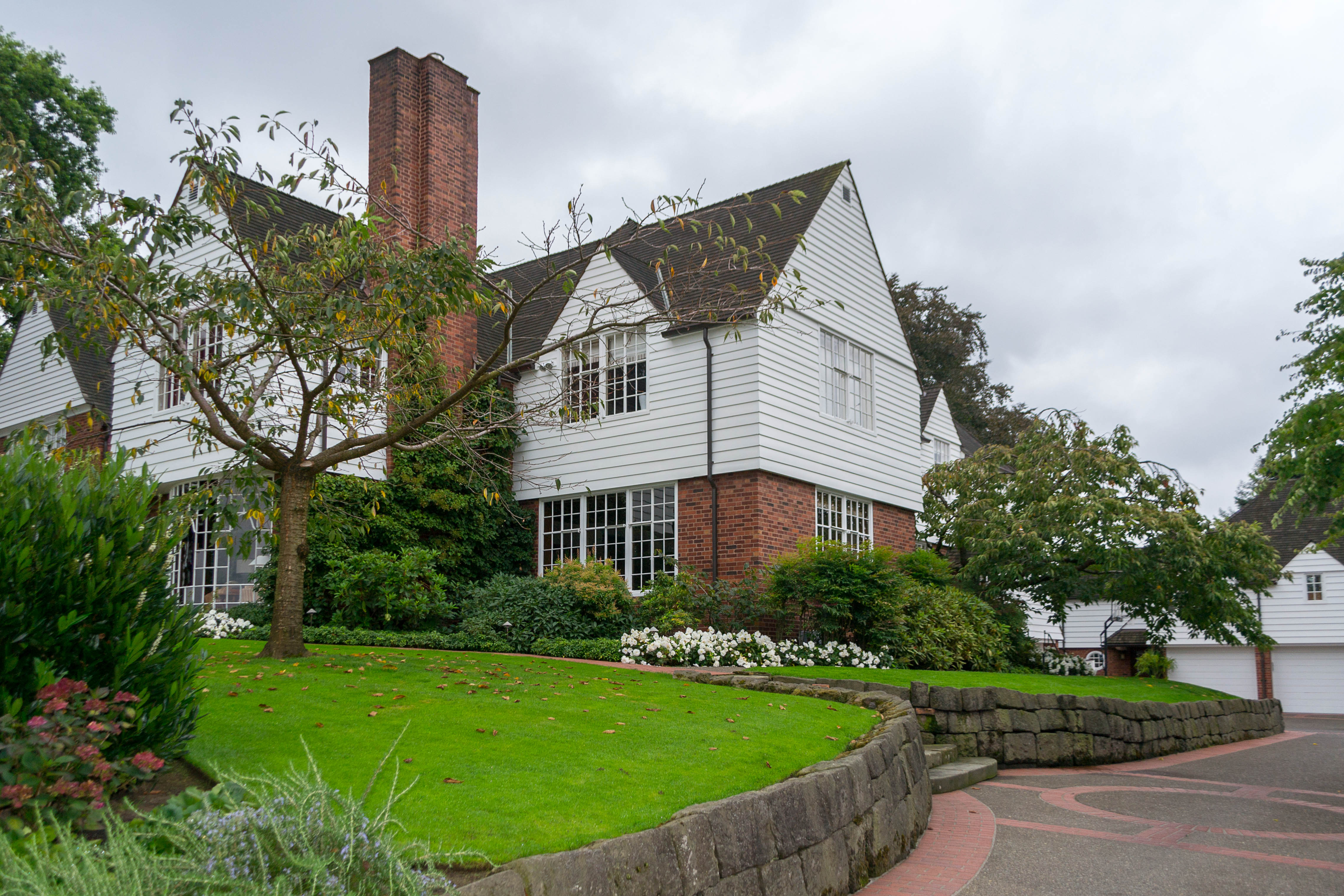
- The Zimmerman House in 2013

- Location within Portland, Oregon
- Location: 1840 SW Hawthorne Terrace; Portland, Oregon
- Coordinates: 45°30′28″N 122°41′57″W
- Area: 0.67 acres (0.27 ha)
- Built: 1931
- Architect: Wade Hampton Pipes
- Architectural style: English Cottage
- NRHP reference No.: 91000141
- Added to NRHP: February 28, 1991

The Walter S. Zimmerman House is a historic house located in Portland, Oregon, United States. The Portland architect Wade Hampton Pipes (1877–1961) was the most prominent advocate of the English Arts and Crafts movement in Oregon and established a wide, exclusively residential, body of work in the English Cottage style during his active career (beginning 1911). This 1931 house, designed for the logging and railway businessman Walter Zimmerman, represents a transitional step in the evolution of Pipes's work, moving from traditional stucco walls to brick and adding other Modern details.

The house was added to the National Register of Historic Places in 1991.

== See also ==
- National Register of Historic Places listings in Southwest Portland, Oregon
