= Martin Luther Pipes House =

Historic building in Portland, Oregon, U.S.

- U.S. National Register of Historic Places
- Portland Historic Landmark
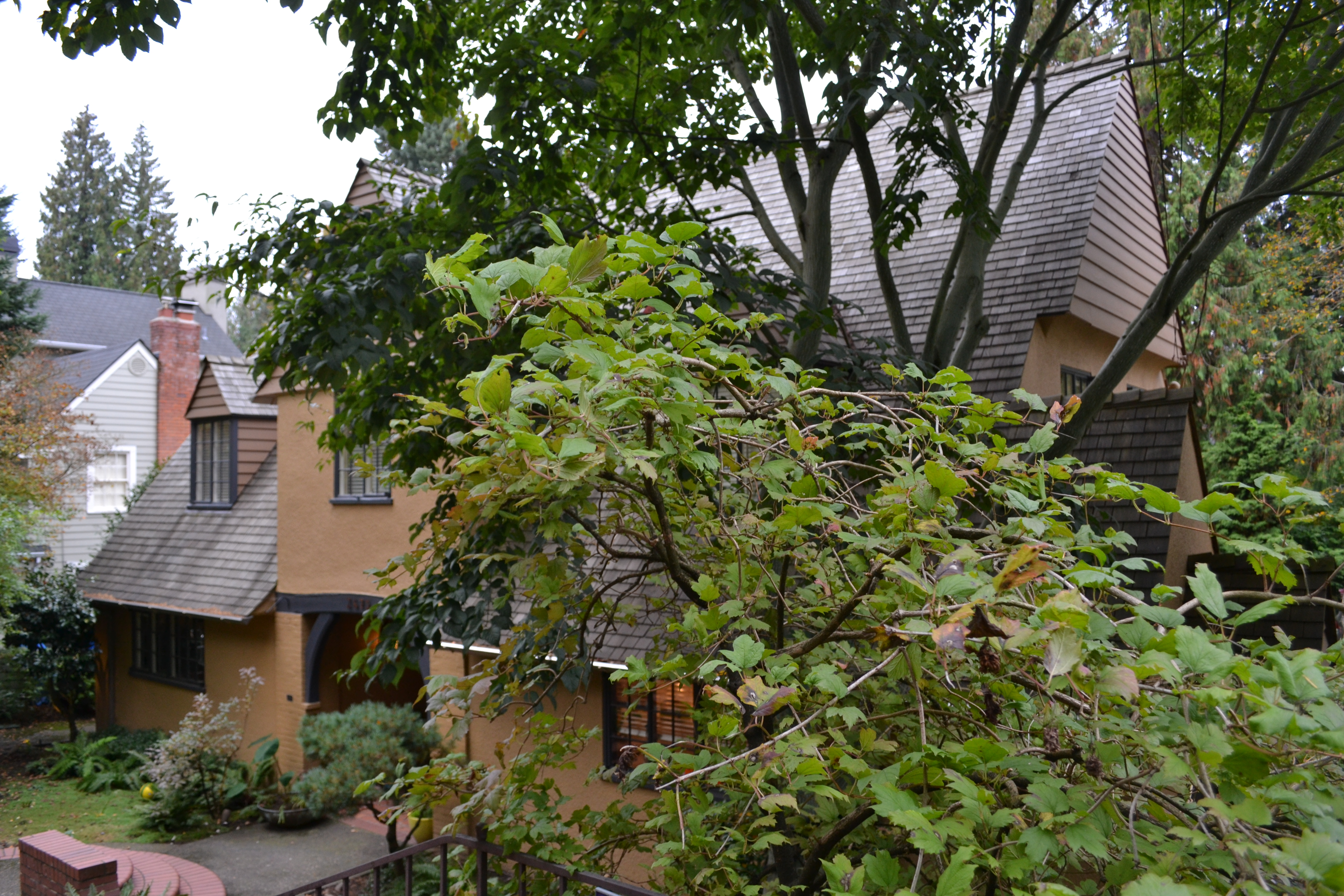
- The Pipes House in 2011.

- Location within Portland, Oregon
- Location: 2675 SW Vista Avenue; Portland, Oregon
- Coordinates: 45°30′23″N 122°42′15″W
- Area: less than one acre
- Built: 1926
- Architect: Wade Hampton Pipes
- Architectural style: English cottage
- NRHP reference No.: 87000310
- Added to NRHP: March 6, 1987

The Martin Luther Pipes House is a house located in southwest Portland, Oregon listed on the National Register of Historic Places.

== See also ==
- National Register of Historic Places listings in Southwest Portland, Oregon
