= Maurice E. Crumpacker =

American politician (1886–1927)

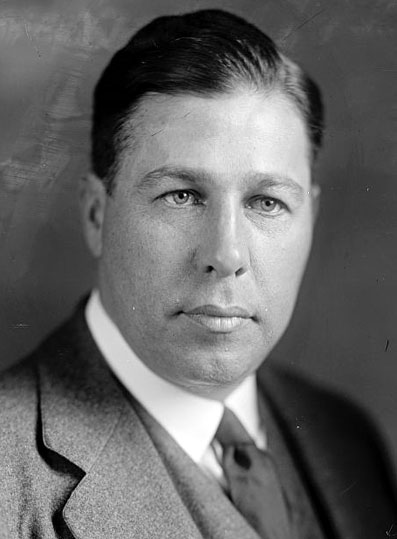

Member of the U.S. House of Representatives from Oregon's 3rd district
- In office March 4, 1925 – July 24, 1927
- Preceded by: Elton Watkins
- Succeeded by: Franklin F. Korell

Personal details
- Born: Maurice Edgar Crumpacker; December 19, 1886 Valparaiso, Indiana, U.S.
- Died: July 24, 1927 (aged 40) San Francisco, California, U.S.
- Resting place: River View Cemetery
- Party: Republican
- Spouse: Cully Cook Crumpacker
- Education: University of Michigan; Harvard University School of Law

Maurice Edgar Crumpacker (December 19, 1886 – July 24, 1927) was an American lawyer, World War I veteran, and politician who served two terms as a Republican U.S. congressman from Oregon from 1925 until his death in 1927.

== Early life ==
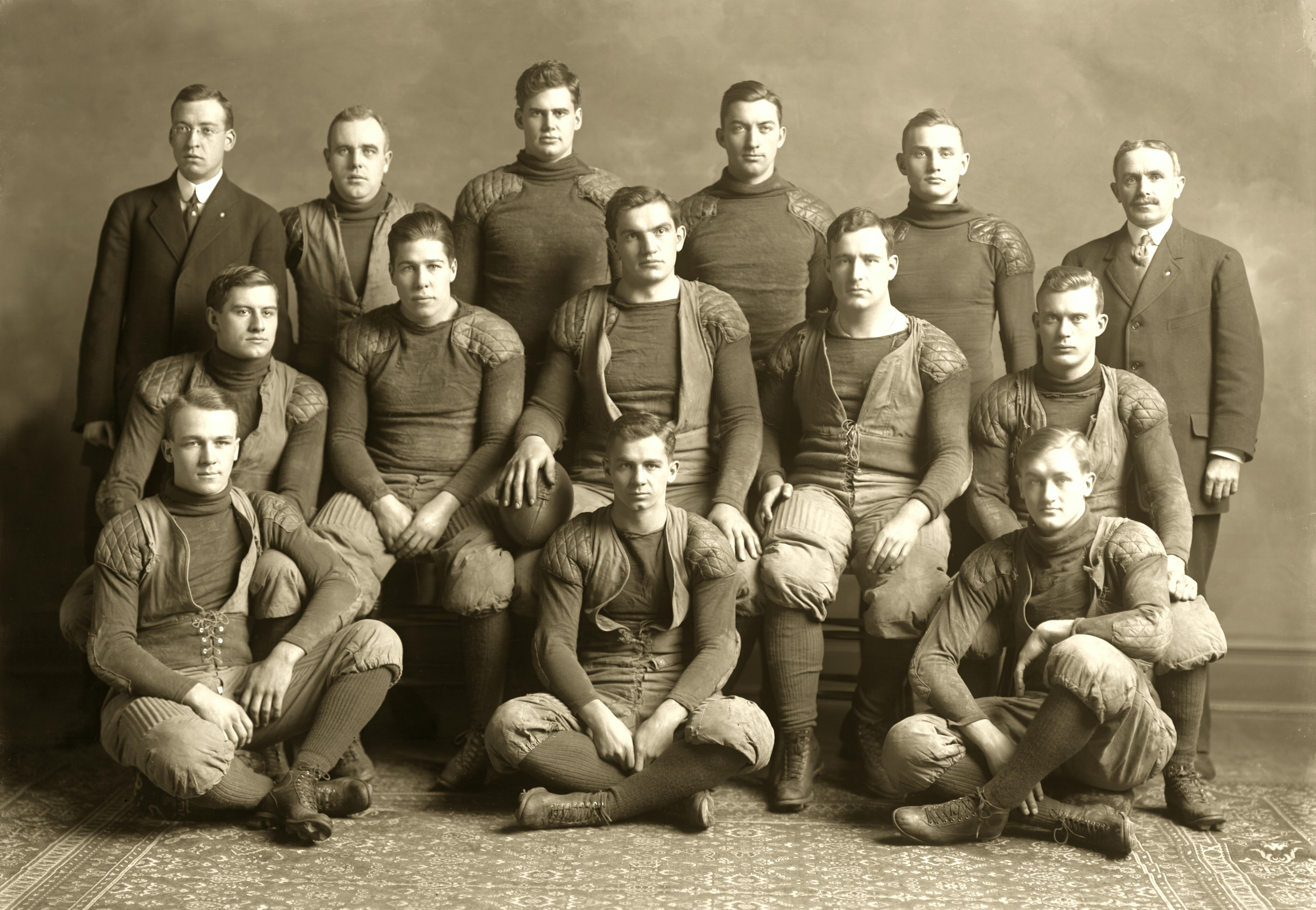
Crumpacker (middle row, second from left) was the starting right tackle for the 1908 Michigan Wolverines football team

Crumpacker was born in Valparaiso, Indiana in 1886, where he attended the public schools until his father, Edgar D. Crumpacker, was elected to the United States House of Representatives when Maurice was 10 years old. (Crumpacker's cousin, Shepard J. Crumpacker, Jr., would also serve in the House of Representatives representing Indiana.)

The younger Crumpacker completed his primary education in Washington, D.C., then returned to Indiana, where he graduated from the Culver Military Academy in 1905. Crumpacker attended the University of Michigan, where he was a starting right tackle for Fielding H. Yost's 1908 Michigan Wolverines football team in his senior year.

After graduating from Michigan in 1909, Crumpacker studied law at Harvard University School of Law and was admitted to the bar in 1912.

== Move to Oregon ==
Crumpacker set up his law practice in Portland, Oregon in 1912.

=== World War I ===
As the United States moved towards participation in World War I, he was commissioned as a first lieutenant in the U. S. Army's Aviation Section, U.S. Signal Corps, and in 1917, was put in charge of Loyal Legion of Loggers and Lumbermen, the company union for the Army's Spruce Production Division which supplied lumber for military aircraft and ships. He was eventually promoted to captain of the division and was honorably discharged in 1918.

== Political career ==
In 1921, Crumpacker was appointed special deputy district attorney for Multnomah County, and ran unsuccessfully for the Republican nomination for U.S. Congress in 1922. In 1924, he won the nomination, and was elected representative for Oregon's 3rd congressional district. He was re-elected in 1925 for the sixty-ninth and seventieth Congresses.

== Mysterious death ==
In July 1927, Crumpacker was invited by House speaker Nicholas Longworth to journey down the west coast from Seattle in a special train car as the guest of a Northern Pacific Railroad director. Crumpacker, who was 6' 2" tall and weighed 200 pounds (1.88 m, 91 kg), was uncomfortable during the travel through California's hot Central Valley. The train arrived in San Francisco on July 22, with plans to travel on to Salinas and then to California Senator James D. Phelan's ranch the next day. But when it was time to depart, Crumpacker could not be found, and the party left without him.

He was found later that day on a curb, acting strangely and claiming he had been poisoned. He was eventually subdued, handcuffed, and taken to the hospital, where the evaluating physician noted that he appeared to be "under a great nervous strain" and showing "symptoms of a paranoiac." Crumpacker eventually persuaded hospital officials to release him the next morning.

Word of Crumpacker's strange behavior had reached Thomas Smart, a Seattle newsman on vacation, and he agreed to accompany Crumpacker back home to Portland that night. But as Smart went for a walk with Crumpacker along San Francisco Bay, Crumpacker suddenly ran and jumped into the Bay. By the time Smart and others pulled him from the water, he was dead. Crumpacker left several notes indicating that he believed he had been murdered by his friends.

== Legacy ==
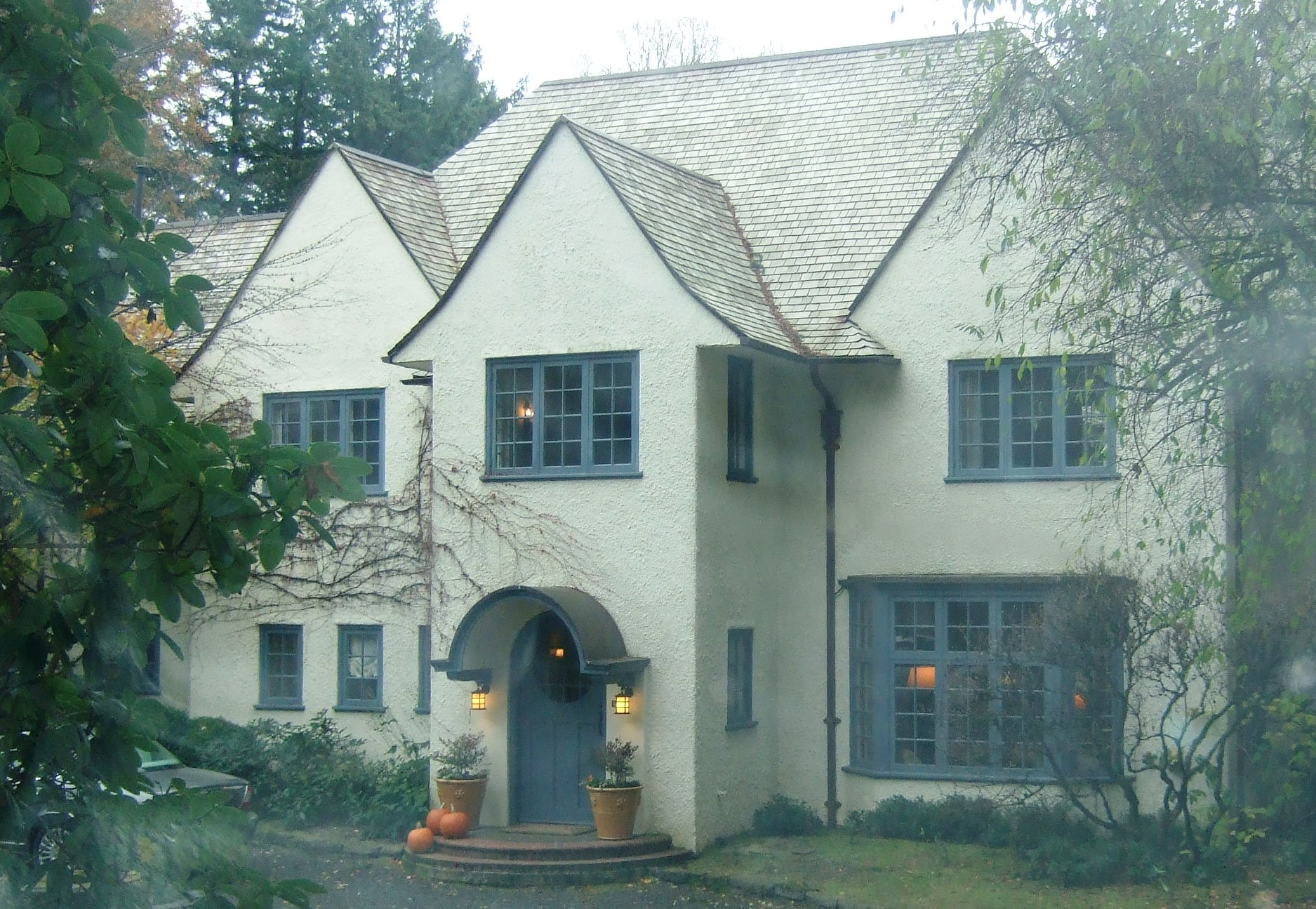
The Maurice Crumpacker House in Portland's Dunthorpe neighborhood

Crumpacker's body was returned to Portland amid effusive praise for his service. He was buried in River View Cemetery in Portland. He left a wife, Cully Cook Crumpacker, and three sons, James, Edgar, and Peter.

His Portland home, the Maurice Crumpacker House, was built by acclaimed Portland architect Wade Hampton Pipes and was added to the National Register of Historic Places in 1992.

== See also ==
- List of members of the United States Congress who died in office (1900–1949)

U.S. House of Representatives
Preceded by Elton Watkins	Member of the U.S. House of Representatives from Oregon's 3rd congressional district March 4, 1925 – July 24, 1927	Succeeded by Franklin F. Korell
