= Elizabeth Ducey House =

Historic building in Portland, Oregon, U.S.

- U.S. National Register of Historic Places
- Portland Historic Landmark
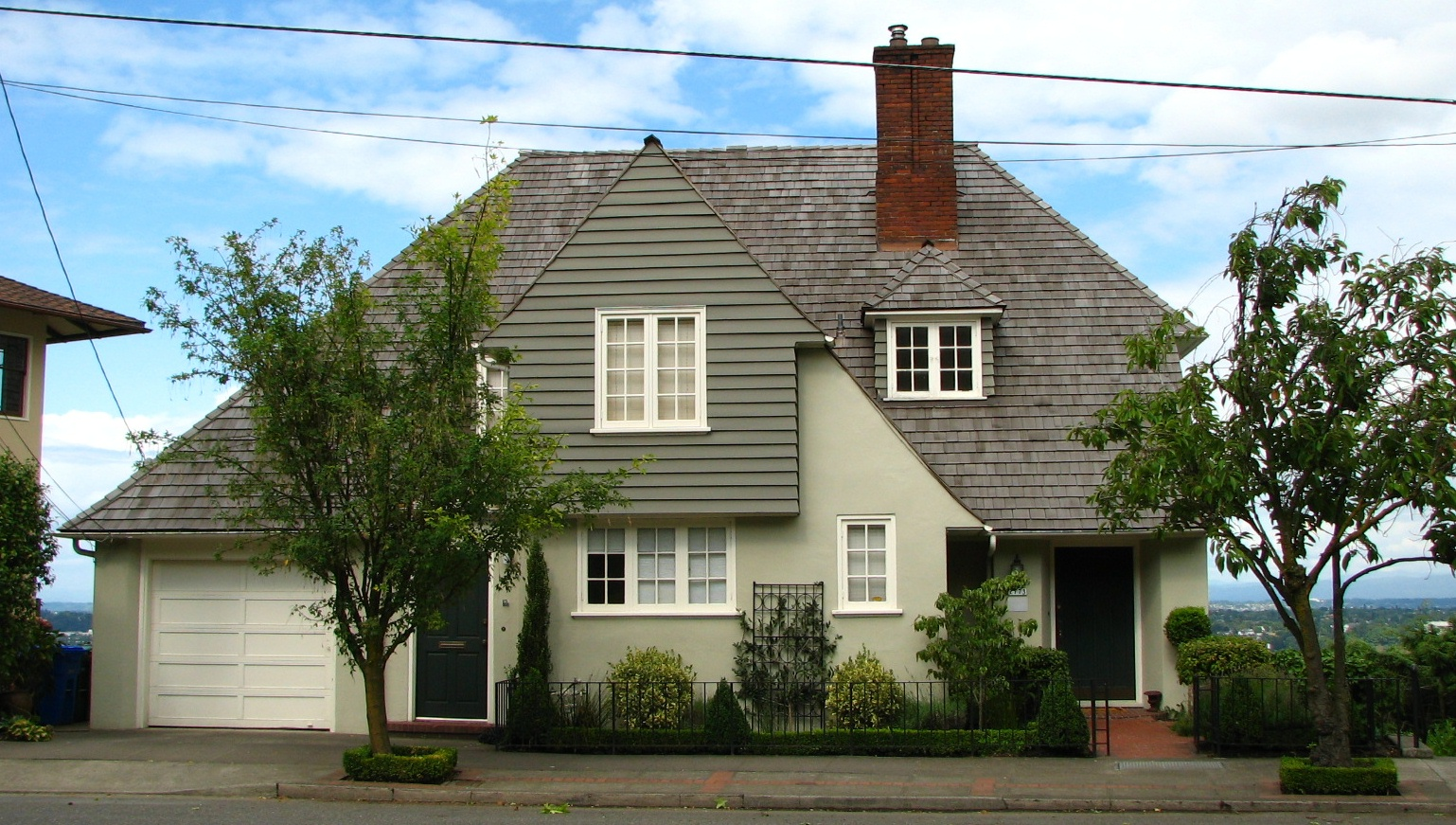
- Elizabeth Ducey House in 2008

- Location within Portland, Oregon
- Location: 2773 NW Westover Road; Portland, Oregon
- Coordinates: 45°31′51″N 122°42′27″W
- Built: 1927
- Architect: Wade Hampton Pipes
- Architectural style: English Cottage
- NRHP reference No.: 90000839
- Added to NRHP: June 1, 1990

The Elizabeth Ducey House is a house located in northwest Portland, Oregon, listed on the National Register of Historic Places.

== See also ==
- National Register of Historic Places listings in Northwest Portland, Oregon
