= John M. and Elizabeth Bates House No. 1 =

Historic building in Portland, Oregon, U.S.

- U.S. National Register of Historic Places
- Portland Historic Landmark
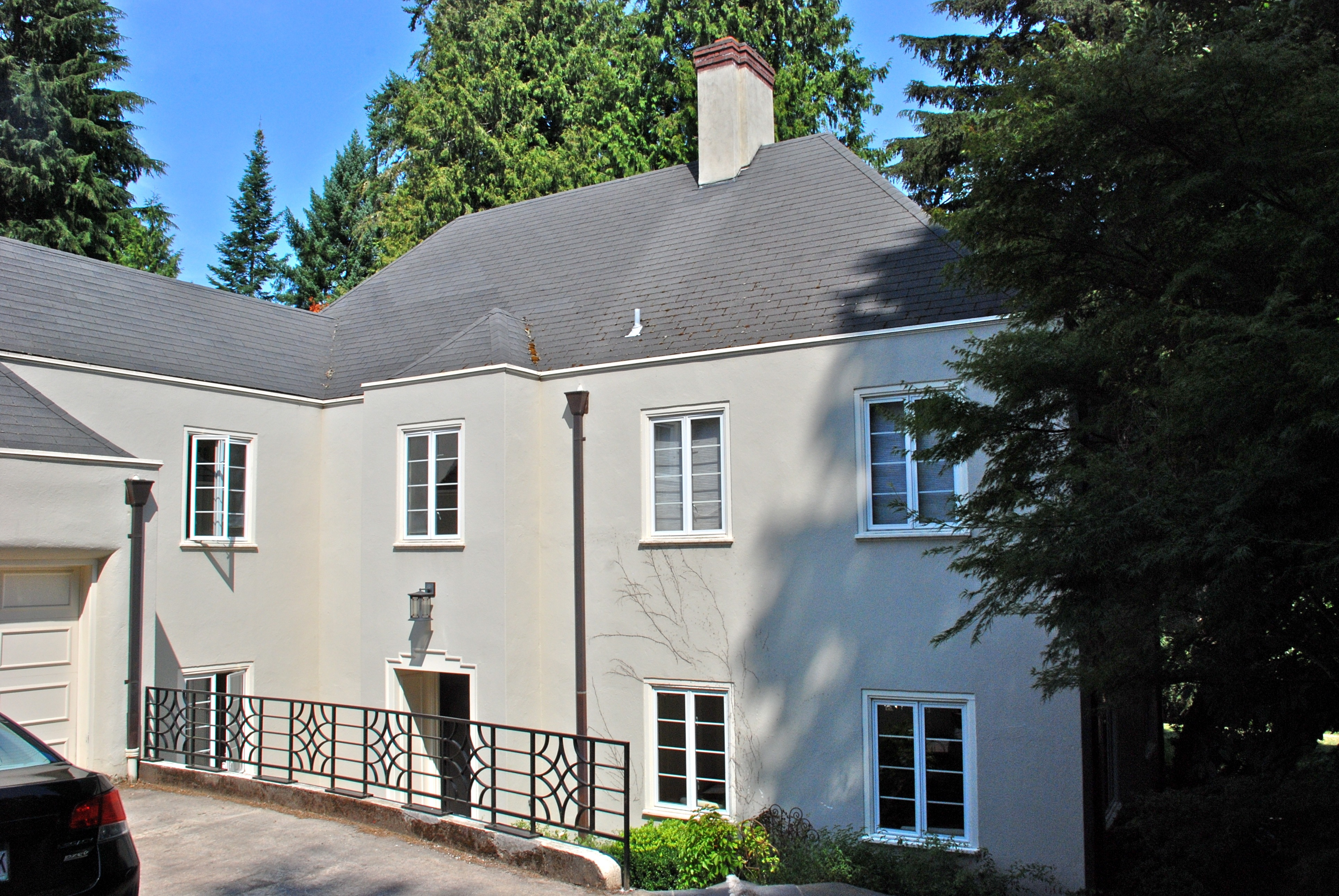
- The Bates House in 2014

- Location within Portland, Oregon
- Location: 1837 SW Edgewood Road; Portland, Oregon
- Coordinates: 45°30′16″N 122°41′55″W
- Area: 0.12 acres (0.049 ha)
- Built: 1935
- Architect: Wade Hampton Pipes
- Architectural style: Arts and Crafts
- MPS: Wade Pipes Residences for John and Elizabeth Bates MPS
- NRHP reference No.: 90000846
- Added to NRHP: June 12, 1990

The John M. and Elizabeth Bates House No. 1 is a historic house in Portland, Oregon, United States. Architect Wade Pipes, a pivotal figure in the Arts and Crafts movement in Oregon, designed the house in the mid-1930s for his close friends John and Elizabeth Bates. Built in 1935, it represents that decade's transition in Pipes' focus from English vernacular exterior elements toward clean lines, rectilinear forms, and minimal decoration. Its interior spaces and details express his devotion to Arts and Crafts principles. John and Elizabeth Bates subsequently commissioned three further houses from him.

The house was added to the National Register of Historic Places in 1990.

== See also ==
- National Register of Historic Places listings in Southwest Portland, Oregon
- John M. and Elizabeth Bates House No. 4
