= Bertha M. and Marie A. Green House =

Historic building in Portland, Oregon, U.S.

- U.S. National Register of Historic Places
- Portland Historic Landmark
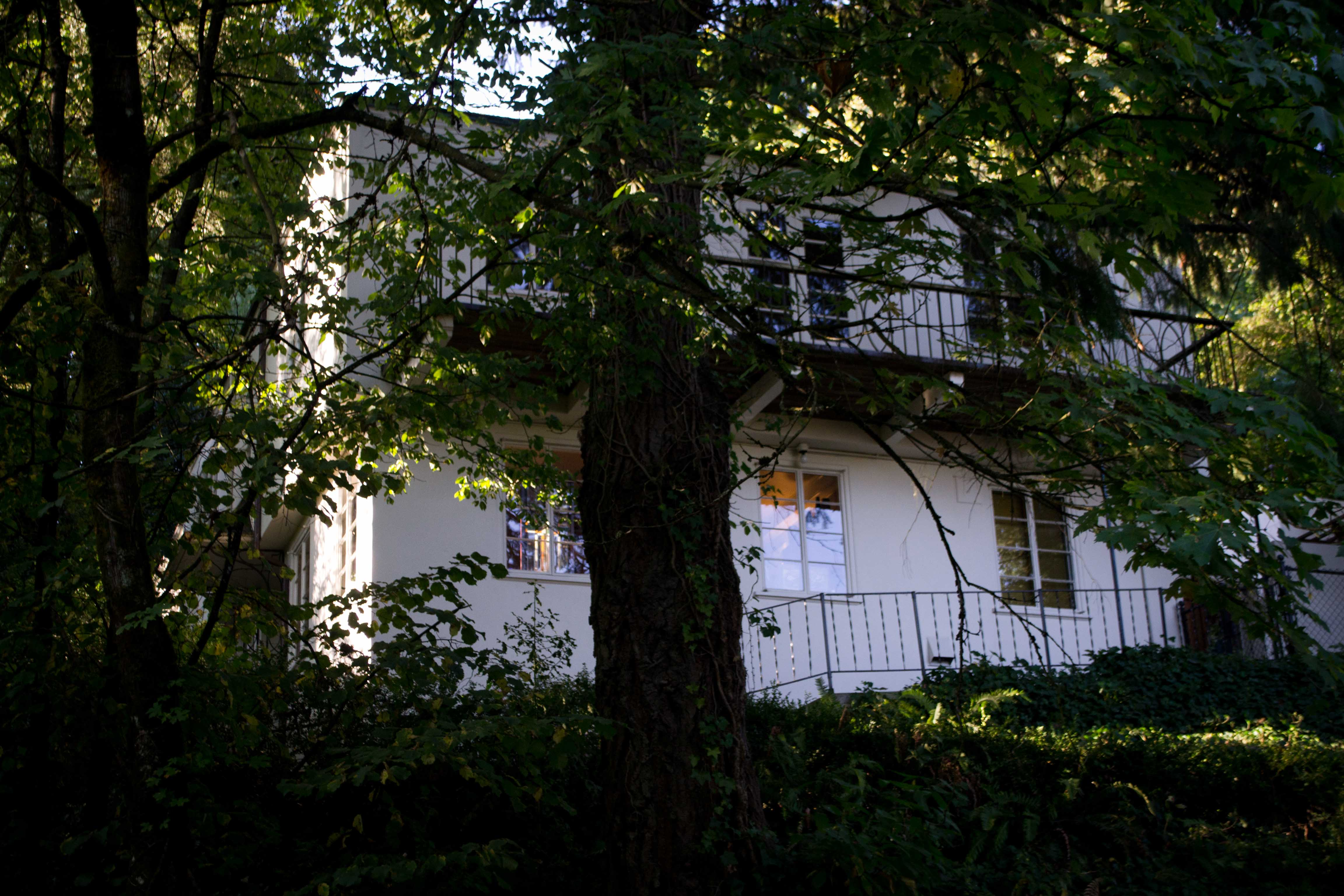
- Bertha M. and Marie A. Green House in 2012

- Location within Portland, Oregon Location within Oregon Location within the United States
- Location: 2610 SW Vista Avenue; Portland, Oregon
- Coordinates: 45°30′30″N 122°42′11″W
- Area: 0.2 acres (0.081 ha)
- Built: 1937
- Architect: Wade Hampton Pipes
- Architectural style: Colonial Revival, Art Deco, Modernistic, Georgian Revival
- NRHP reference No.: 92001379
- Added to NRHP: October 15, 1992

The Bertha M. and Marie A. Green House is a building located in southwest Portland, Oregon, listed on the National Register of Historic Places.

== See also ==
- National Register of Historic Places listings in Southwest Portland, Oregon
