= Tim Charles Phillips =

American investment manager (born 1966)

- Born: Tim Charles Phillips; July 7, 1966 (age 60); Sacramento, California, U.S.
- Education: Pepperdine University (BA)
- Occupations: Investment manager, political activist, philanthropist
- Employer(s): Phillips & Company
- Known for: Founder and CEO of Phillips & Company
- Title: Chief executive officer
- Spouse: Kristen Phillips
- Children: 2

Tim Charles Phillips (born July 7, 1966 Sacramento, California) is an American investment manager, political activist and philanthropist. He is the founder and CEO of Phillips & Company, one of Portland, Oregon's largest investment firms. He has appeared in the news media numerous times over the years to share his insight and analysis on the state of the US economy and its impact on investors. Phillips, his wife Kristen and their two children currently live in the Portland area.

== Political life ==
Phillips is an active member of the Oregon Republican Party. He once ranked 23rd on a list of the 50 Most Influential Political Figures in the State of Oregon. After his unsuccessful bid to become the Republican candidate for Congress in 2004, Phillips and fellow party member Ron Saxton formed the Oregon Leadership Roundtable, with the intent bringing together Republicans to figure out how to reverse the party's decline in the state. Saxton ran for Governor of Oregon in 2006, only to be defeated by Democrat Ted Kulongoski.

== Community involvement ==
Phillips served as the board chairman of the Children's Cancer Association (CCA) and also serves on the OHSU Cancer Council. He is also a Regent at Pepperdine University and serves on their endowment committee.

As an enthusiastic advocate for community involvement, Phillips has encouraged volunteerism within his company. He encourages employees to volunteer with their favorite organizations and directs the company to support such causes as the YMCA, Portland Art Museum, CCA, OHSU Foundation, and Orphans Overseas.

== Education ==
Phillips received a Bachelor's degree from Pepperdine University in 1987. He currently serves on the university's Board of Regents and the Endowment Committee.
