= Elton Watkins =

American politician

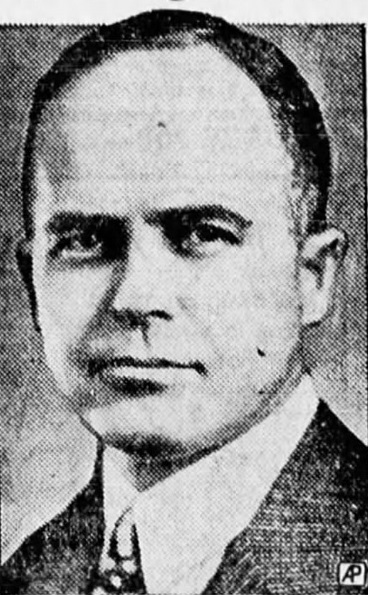

Member of the U.S. House of Representatives from Oregon's 3rd district
- In office March 4, 1923 – March 3, 1925
- Preceded by: Clifton N. McArthur
- Succeeded by: Maurice Edgar Crumpacker

Personal details
- Born: July 6, 1881 Newton, Mississippi, U.S.
- Died: June 24, 1956 (aged 74) Portland, Oregon, U.S.
- Resting place: Greenwood Hills Cemetery
- Party: Democratic
- Spouse: Daniela Ruth Sturgis

Elton Watkins (July 6, 1881 – June 24, 1956) was an American lawyer who served one term as a Congressman representing Oregon's 3rd congressional district for one term from 1923 to 1925. The son of a Confederate soldier, Watkins also served as an assistant U.S. Attorney.

== Early life ==
Watkins was born in Newton, Mississippi on July 6, 1881. His father was a veteran of the Confederate Army, and the younger Watkins was educated at the Webb School in Bell Buckle, Tennessee before attending college at Washington and Lee University in Virginia, where he graduated in 1910 with a Bachelor of Arts. Watkins then went on to law school at Georgetown where he earned an LL.B. Then in 1912, he graduated with a master's degree from George Washington University Law School. During part of his time in Washington, DC he worked for the Federal Bureau of Investigation.

== Oregon ==
Also in 1912 he moved to Oregon where he was admitted to the state bar. During World War I he returned to the FBI and in 1918, married Daniela Ruth Sturgis. The couple had two children. In 1919, he became an assistant attorney for the United States District of Oregon.

=== Congress ===
Then in 1922 he won election as a Democrat to the United States House of Representatives from Oregon’s 3rd congressional district. He lost his re-election bid in 1924.

== Later life ==
In 1930 Watkins was the Democratic nominee for U.S. Senate, but lost to incumbent Charles L. McNary. Then in 1932, he ran again and lost in the primary. Also in 1932, he ran and lost a bid to be Portland’s mayor.

=== Death and burial ===
He tried a second time for the mayors office in 1940 and lost. He then returned to the practice of law in Portland, where he died on June 24, 1956. He was buried in Greenwood Hills Cemetery.

Party political offices
Preceded by Milton A. Miller	Democratic nominee for U.S. Senator from Oregon (Class 2); 1930	Succeeded by Willis Mahoney
U.S. House of Representatives
Preceded by Clifton N. McArthur	Member of the U.S. House of Representatives from Oregon's 3rd congressional district March 4, 1923 – March 3, 1925	Succeeded by Maurice Edgar Crumpacker
