= Dr. Frank B. Kistner House =

Historic building in Portland, Oregon, U.S.

- U.S. National Register of Historic Places
- Portland Historic Landmark
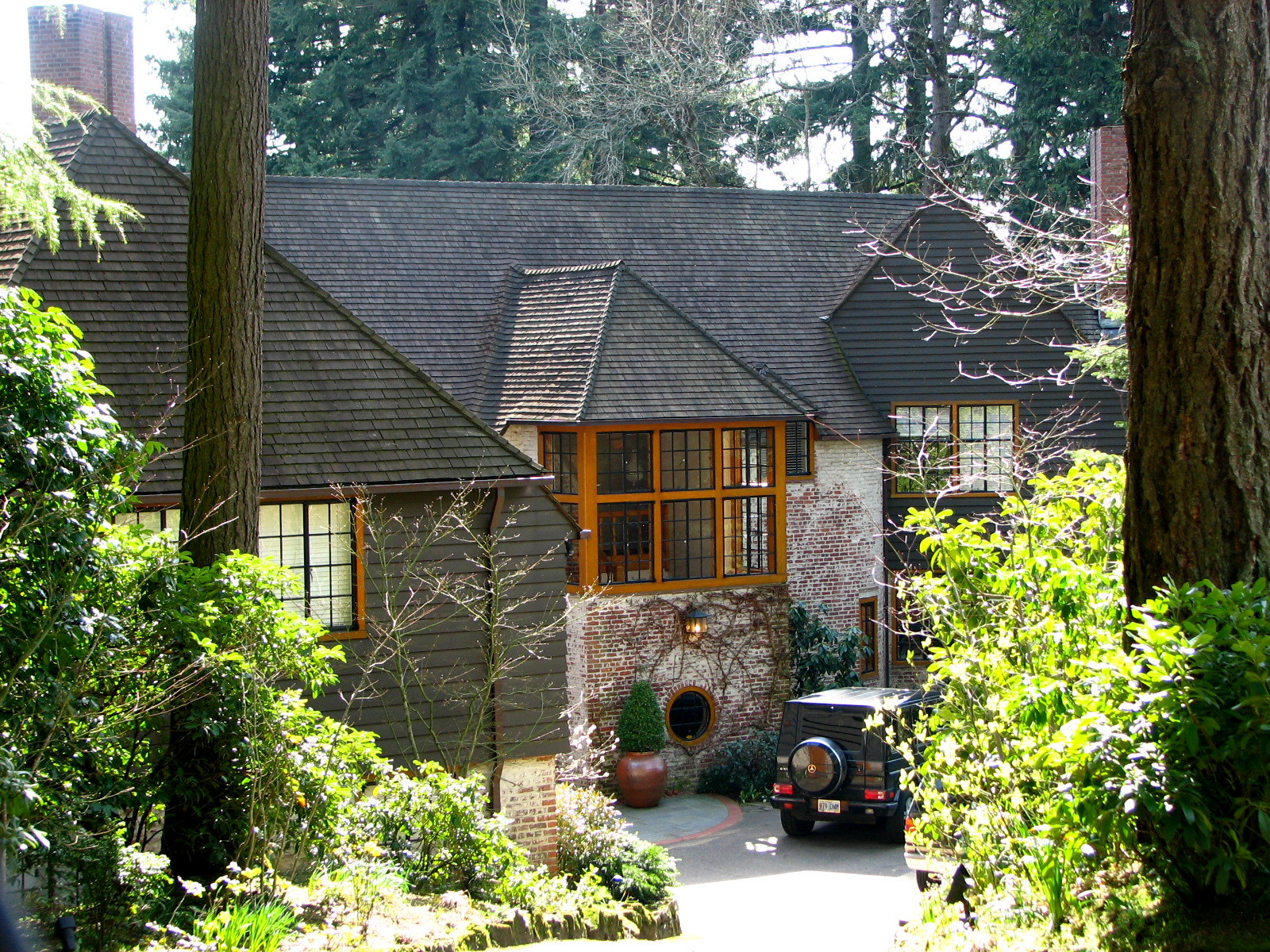
- The Kistner House in 2009.

- Location within Portland, Oregon
- Location: 5400 SW Hewett Boulevard; Portland, Oregon
- Coordinates: 45°30′07″N 122°43′58″W
- Area: 1 acre (0.40 ha)
- Built: 1930
- Architect: Wade Hampton Pipes, Nels J. & Melvin O. Nelson
- Architectural style: Late 19th and 20th Century Revivals, English Cottage style
- NRHP reference No.: 87000681
- Added to NRHP: April 30, 1987

The Dr. Frank B. Kistner House, also known as the Kistner–Kalberer House, is a house located in southwest Portland, Oregon listed on the National Register of Historic Places.

== See also ==
- National Register of Historic Places listings in Southwest Portland, Oregon
