= 2008 Oregon Republican presidential primary =

- May 2 to May 6, 2008
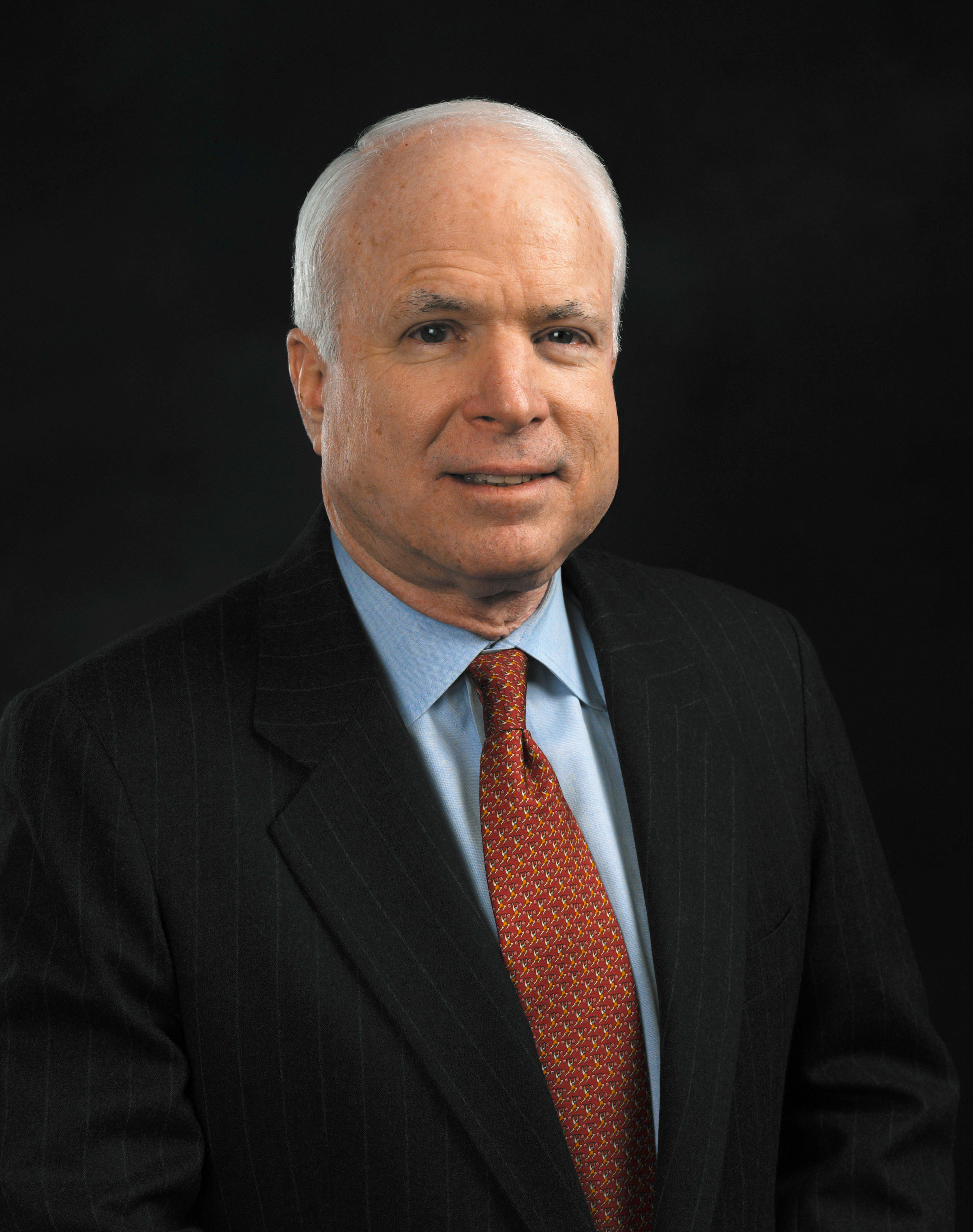

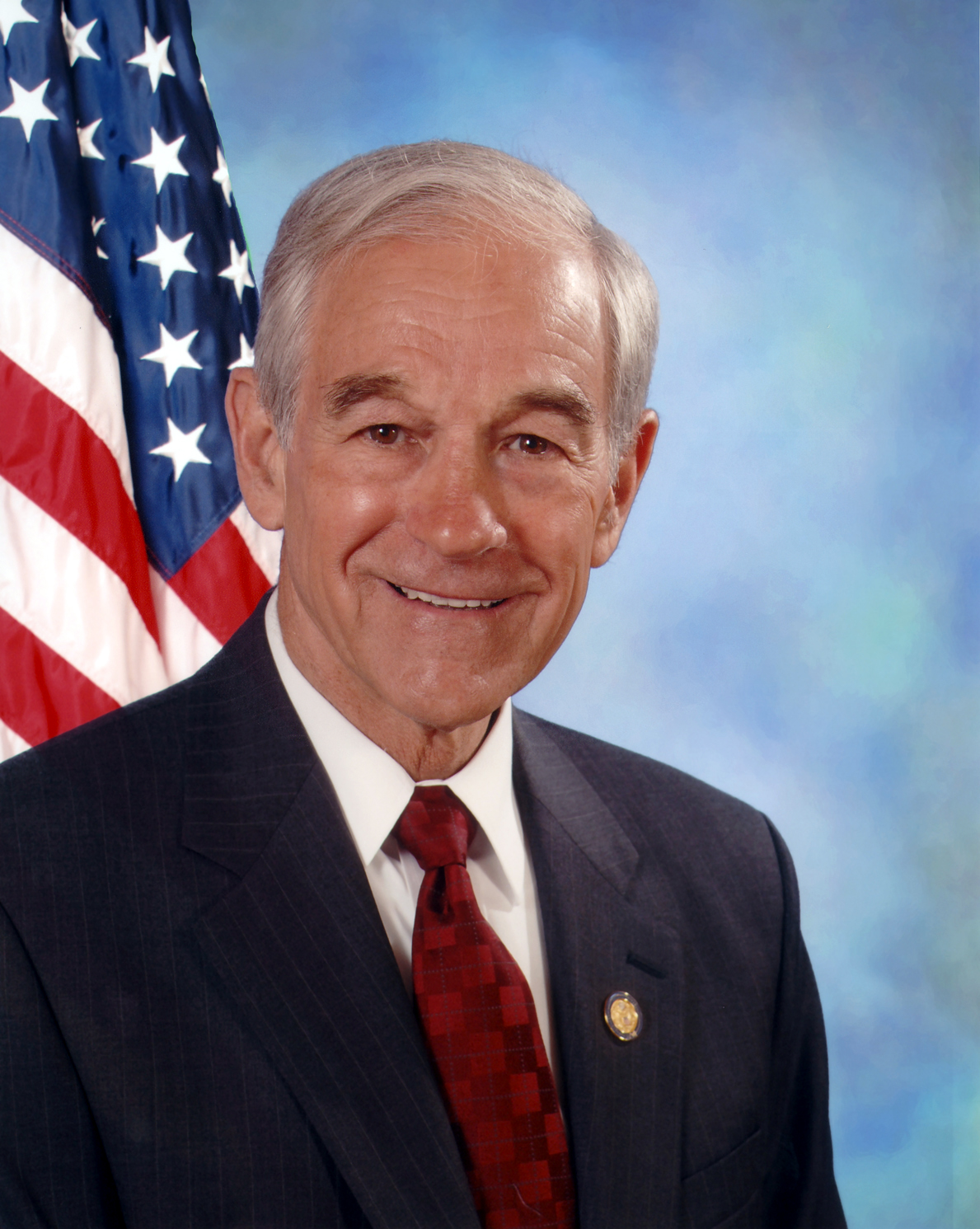
Candidate	John McCain	Ron Paul
Party	Republican	Republican
Home state	Arizona	Texas
Delegate count	23	4
Popular vote	285,881	51,100
Percentage	80.88%	14.46%
- Election results by county. John McCain

The 2008 Oregon Republican presidential primary was a mail only primary in the U.S. state of Oregon. Ballots were mailed to registered Republican voters between May 2 and May 6, 2008. To be counted, all ballots must have been received by county elections offices by 8:00 p.m. PDT on May 20, 2008. It was a closed primary; in order to vote in Republican races, residents must have registered as Republicans on or before April 29, 2008.

== Presidential race ==
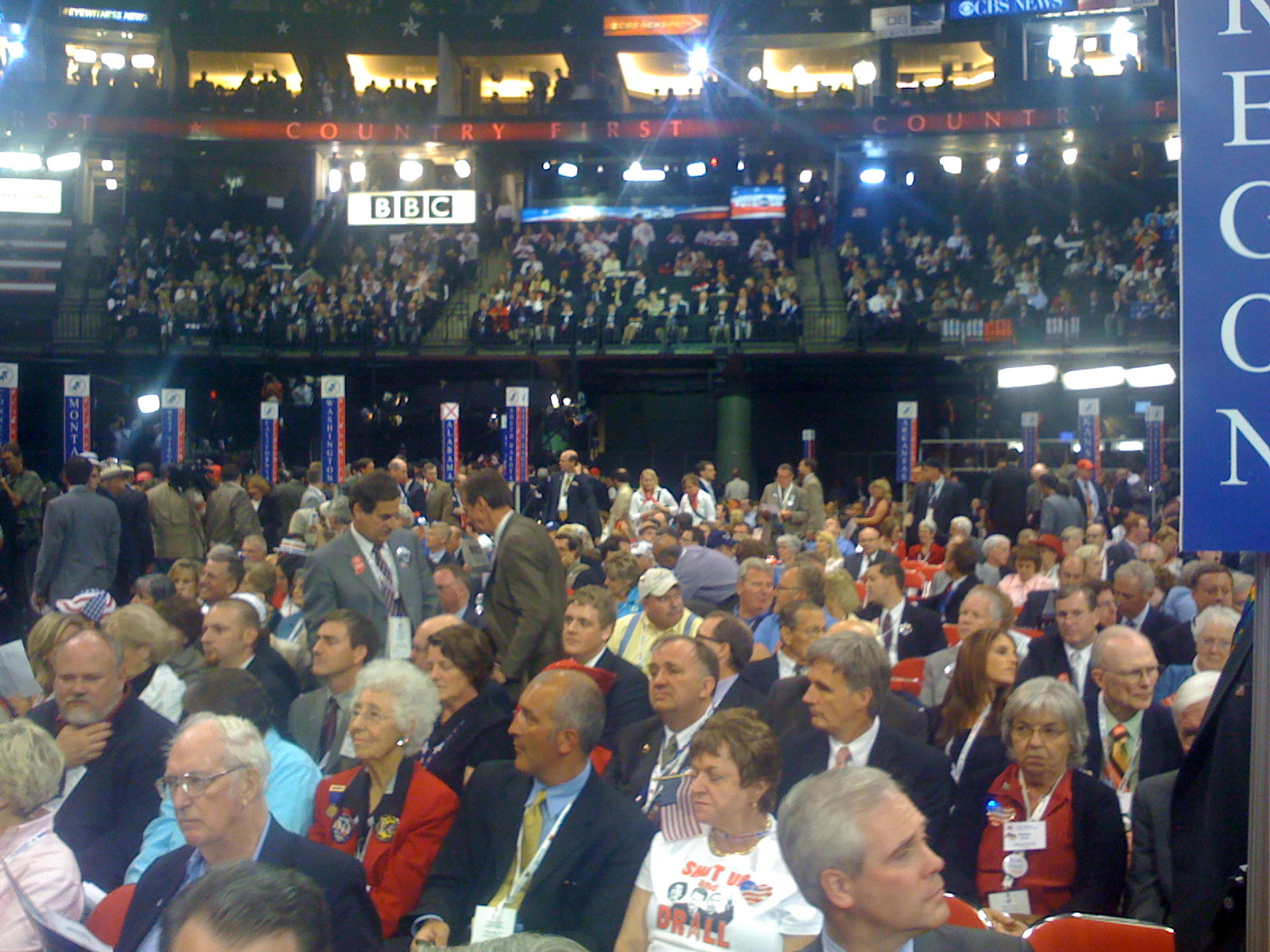
The Oregon delegation attending the 2008 Republican National Convention

In the race for the Republican nominee for President of the United States, there were two candidates on the Oregon ballot: John McCain and Ron Paul.

=== Results ===
2008 Oregon Republican presidential primary Official Results
Candidate	Votes	Percentage	Delegates
John McCain	285,881	80.88%	23
Ron Paul	51,100	14.46%	4
Write-in	16,495	4.67%	0
Total	349,914	100.00%	27

== Other races ==
=== U.S. Senate ===
Incumbent Senator Gordon Smith defeated Gordon Leitch for the Republican nomination as he sought re-election to the United States Senate.

=== U.S. House of Representatives ===
Oregon Republicans selected their candidate in four of Oregon's five congressional districts for the United States House of Representatives. Greg Walden, Oregon's only incumbent Republican congressman, was unopposed in his race in Oregon's 2nd congressional district.

In the 3rd district, real estate investor Delia Lopez was unopposed, and businessman Mike Erickson won a close race in the 5th district. Republicans did not field a candidate in the 4th district.

In the 1st district, retired teacher Joel Haugen won the nomination, but later withdrew it after clashes with party leaders over Haugen's endorsement of Democrat Barack Obama for President. Haugen is now the Independent Party of Oregon candidate, Another Republican Stephan Andrew Brodhead an Iraq War veteran and Real Estate investor Of Hillsboro, Oregon is running an active campaign as a write-in candidate.

=== Statewide offices ===
This election determined the Republican candidate for two statewide offices. For Secretary of State, Rick Dancer was unopposed.; for Treasurer Allen Alley was also unopposed. No Republican filed to run for Attorney General, but there were 13,043 write-in votes. John Kroger, who also won the Democratic primary, got 2,885 votes and will be the Republican nominee as well. Kroger's Democratic rival Greg Macpherson came in second with 1,391 votes.

=== Oregon Senate ===
Half (15) the positions in the Oregon State Senate were up for election. Republicans nominated candidates in 11 Senate districts for the general election, including one successful write-in candidate.

=== Oregon House of Representatives ===
As is the case every two years, all the 60 positions in the Oregon House of Representatives were up for election. Republicans nominated candidates in 44 House districts for the general election, including two successful write-in candidates.

== See also ==
- 2008 Oregon Democratic presidential primary
- 2008 Republican Party presidential primaries
