= 2008 Oregon State Treasurer election =

- November 4, 2008
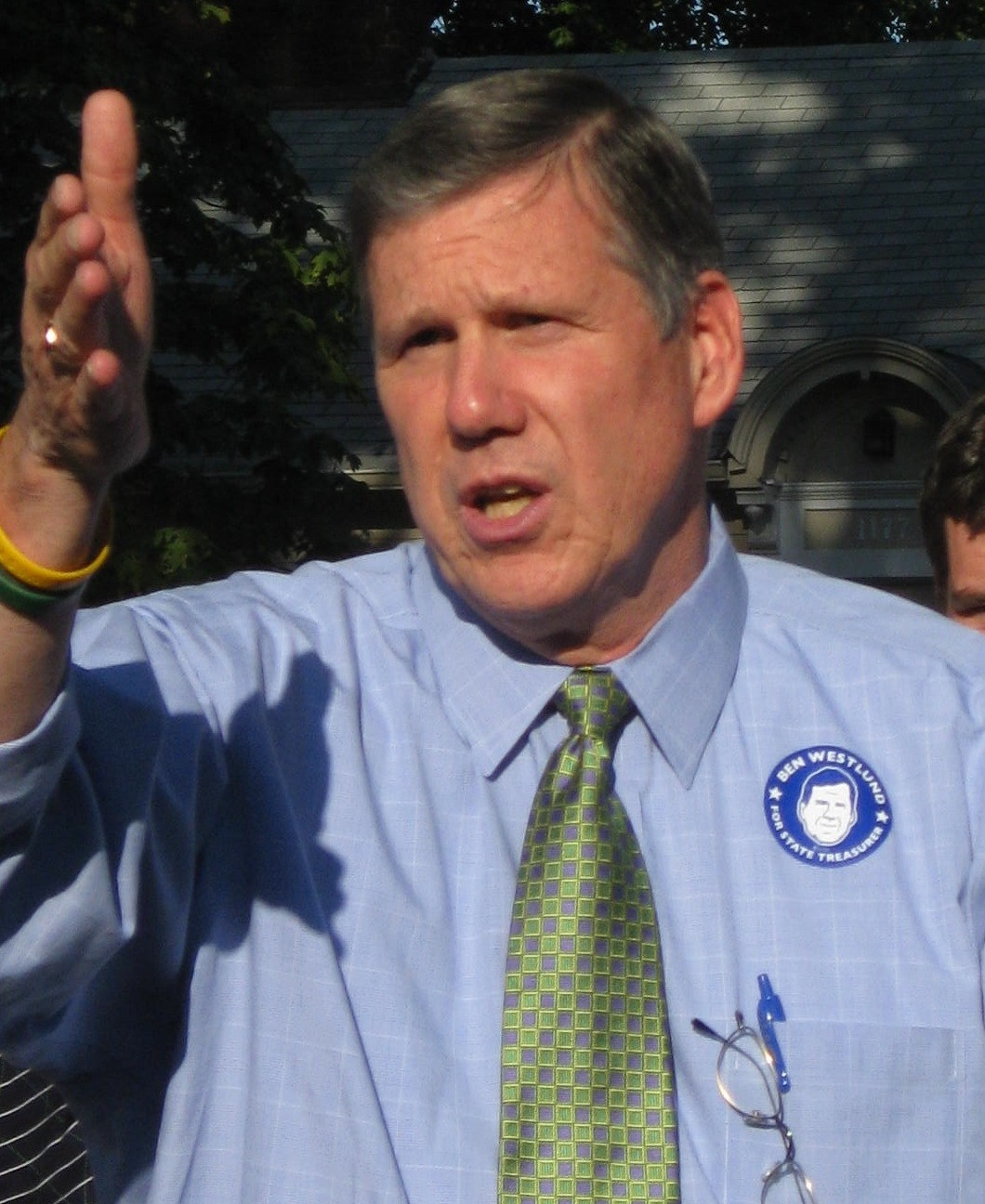

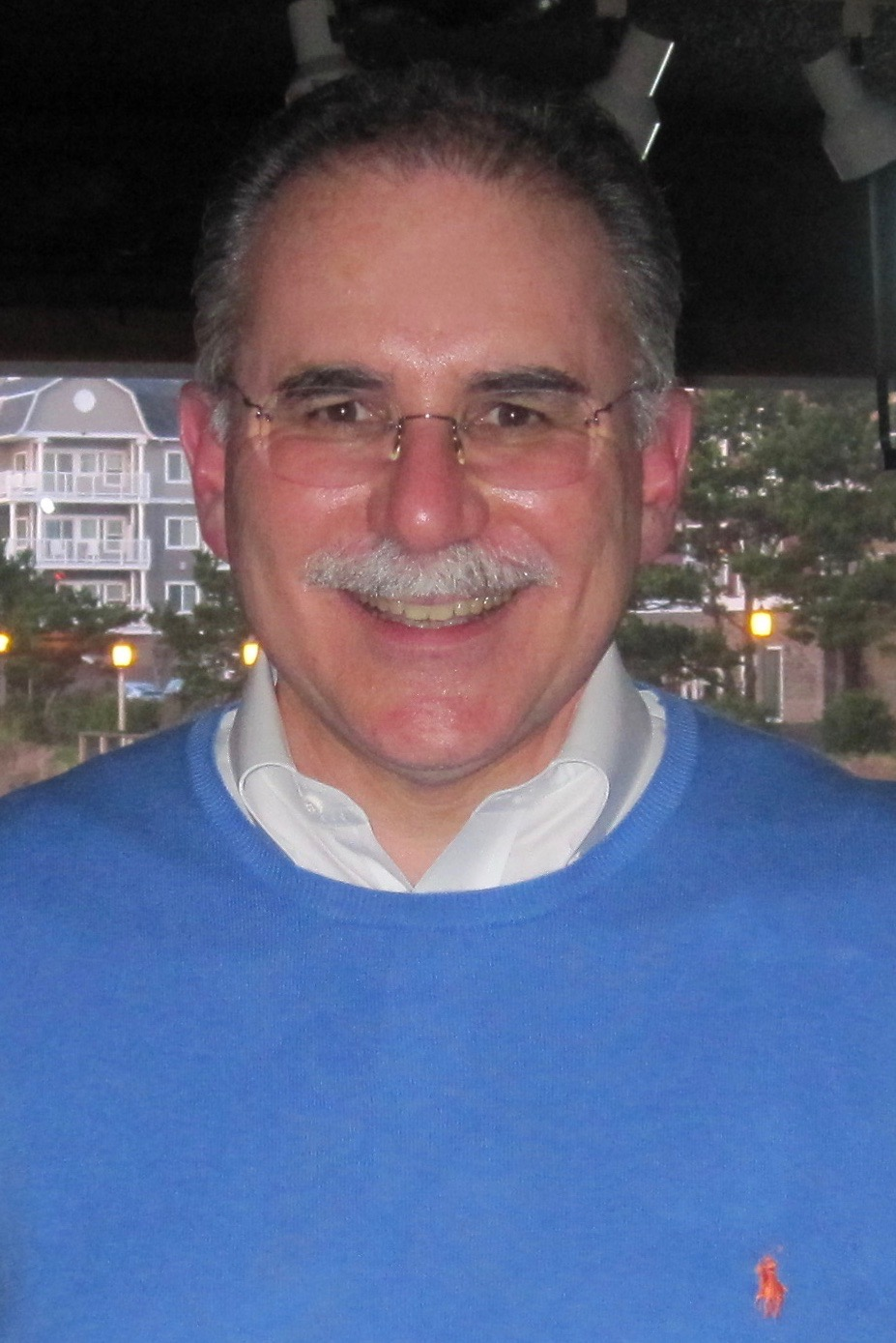
Candidate	Ben Westlund	Allen Alley
Party	Democratic	Republican
Popular vote	847,590	750,484
Percentage	51.12%	45.26%
- County results Westlund: 40–50% 50–60% 60–70% Alley: 40–50% 50–60% 60–70%
State Treasurer before election
Randall Edwards
Democratic
Elected State Treasurer
Ben Westlund
Democratic

The 2008 Oregon State Treasurer election was held on November 4, 2008, in order to elect the Oregon State Treasurer. Democratic nominee and member of the Oregon State Senate from the 27th district Ben Westlund defeated Republican nominee Allen Alley and Constitution nominee Michael Paul Marsh.

== Democratic primary ==
The Democratic primary was held on May 20, 2008, and was easily won by Ben Westlund, as he was the only candidate.

=== Results ===
Oregon State Treasurer Democratic primary, 2008
Party	Candidate	Votes	%
Democratic	Ben Westlund	408,890	99.01
Democratic	Write-ins	4,095	0.99
Total votes		412,985	100

== Republican primary ==
The Republican primary was held on May 20, 2008, and was easily won by Allen Alley, as he was the only candidate.

== General Election ==
The general election was held on November 4, 2008. Democratic nominee Ben Westlund won the election by a margin of 97,106 votes against his foremost opponent Republican nominee Allen Alley, thereby retaining Democratic control over the office of State Treasurer. Westlund was sworn in on January 3, 2009.

=== Results ===
Oregon State Treasurer election, 2008
Party	Candidate	Votes	%
Democratic	Ben Westlund	847,590	51.12
Republican	Allen Alley	750,484	45.26
Constitution	Michael Marsh	56,581	3.41
Write-in		3,529	0.21
Total votes		1,658,184	100%
Democratic hold			
