= Oregon's 38th House district =

Legislative district in Oregon, United States

Oregon's 38th House district after redistricting after the 2020 Census

District 38 of the Oregon House of Representatives is one of 60 House districts in the state of Oregon. As of 2021, the district boundaries include portions of Clackamas and Multnomah counties. The district includes most of Lake Oswego, parts of Tigard and Durham, and the South Waterfront neighborhood of South Portland. The current representative for the district is Democrat Daniel Nguyen of Lake Oswego.

== Election results ==
District boundaries have changed over time. Therefore, representatives before 2021 may not represent the same constituency as today. General election results from 2000 to present are as follows:

Year	Candidate	Party	Percent	Opponent	Party	Percent	Opponent	Party	Percent	Write-in percentage
2000	Cliff Zauner	Republican	57.84%	Ivy Fletcher	Democratic	42.16%	No third candidate			
2002	Greg Macpherson	Democratic	54.29%	Jim Zupancic	Republican	45.60%	No third candidate			0.11%
2004	Greg Macpherson	Democratic	85.68%	Christopher Richter	Libertarian	8.14%	Ernest Richardson	Constitution	4.98%	1.20%
2006	Greg Macpherson	Democratic	68.66%	Fred Bremner	Republican	31.16%	No third candidate			0.18%
2008	Chris Garrett	Democratic	61.85%	Steve Griffith	Republican	38.01%	No third candidate			0.14%
2010	Chris Garrett	Democratic	60.51%	Rob Gardier	Republican	39.40%	No third candidate			0.09%
2012	Chris Garrett	Democratic	68.45%	Tom Magginis	Republican	31.31%	No third candidate			0.24%
2014 (Note: Ann Lininger was the incumbent in this election. She was appointed to this seat on January 29, 2014 to replace Chris Garrett, who resigned to take an appointment to the Oregon Court of Appeals.)	Ann Lininger	Democratic	96.42%	Unopposed						3.58%
2016	Ann Lininger	Democratic	69.69%	Patrick De Klotz	Republican	30.13%	No third candidate			0.18%
2018 (Note: Andrea Salinas was the incumbent in this election. She was appointed to this seat on September 13, 2017 to replace Ann Lininger, who resigned to take an appointment to the Clackamas County Circuit Court.)	Andrea Salinas	Democratic	97.63%	Unopposed						2.37%
2020	Andrea Salinas	Democratic	72.35%	Patrick Castles	Republican	27.55%	No third candidate			0.10%
2022	Daniel Nguyen	Democratic	67.98%	Alistair Firmin	Republican	31.96%	No third candidate			0.06%
2024	Daniel Nguyen	Democratic	97.9%	Unopposed						2.1%

== See also ==
- Oregon Legislative Assembly
- Oregon House of Representatives
