= Renn Fayre =

Annual Reed College event

- Frequency: Annual
- Locations: Reed College, Portland, Oregon, United States
- Website: http://www.rennfayre.com/

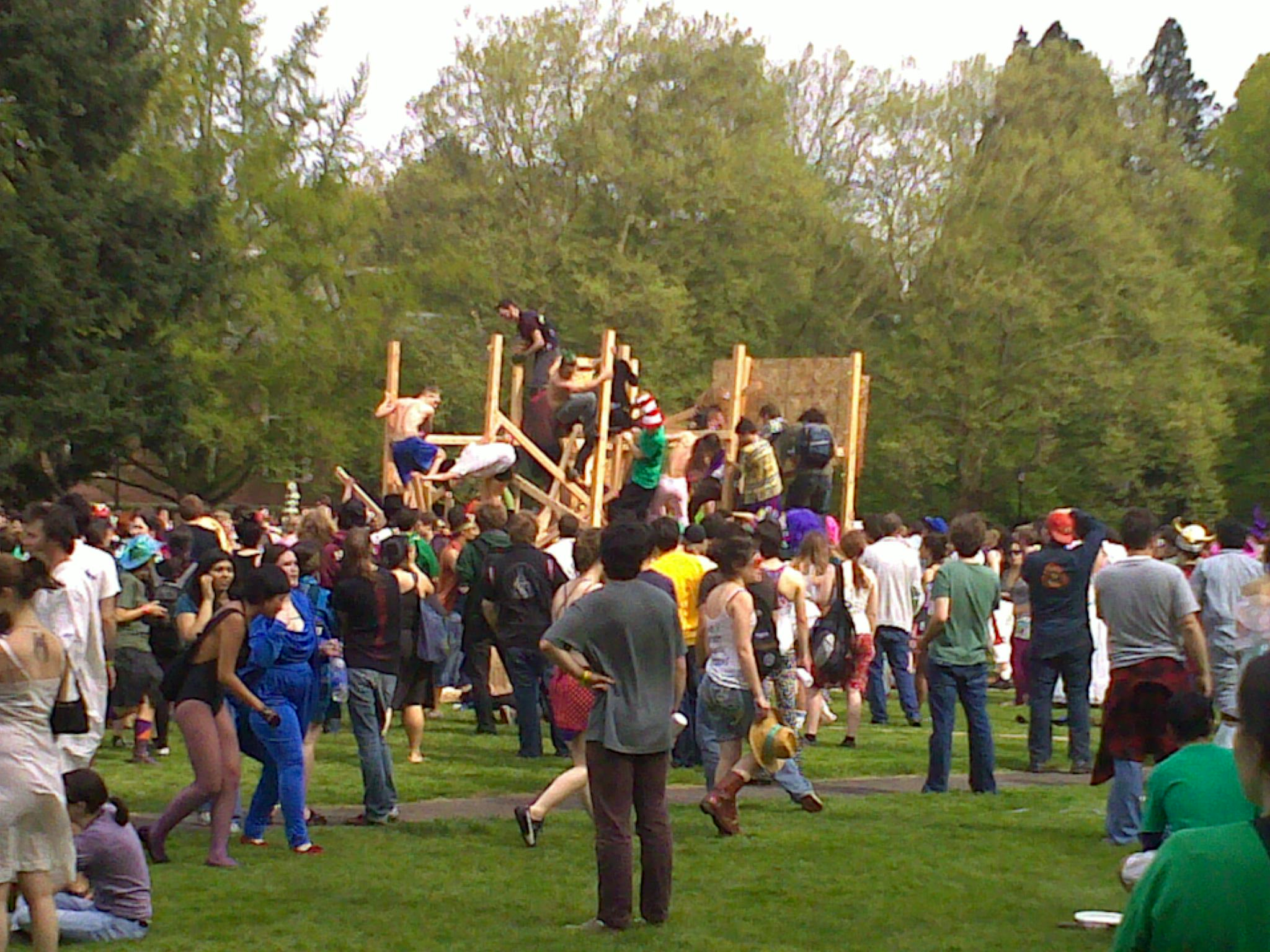
"CHVNK" Tower" being destroyed by students.

Renn Fayre is an annual three-day campus-wide celebration that occurs at Reed College, a liberal arts college located in Portland, Oregon, United States. The festival began as a one-day Renaissance Fayre, held during the spring semester in an attempt to recreate the Renaissance era. The event begins with a parade of senior students, who march from the library to the registrar's office to mark the completion of their theses and to be congratulated by the institution's President. The event includes a variety of activities and forms of expression.

== Description ==
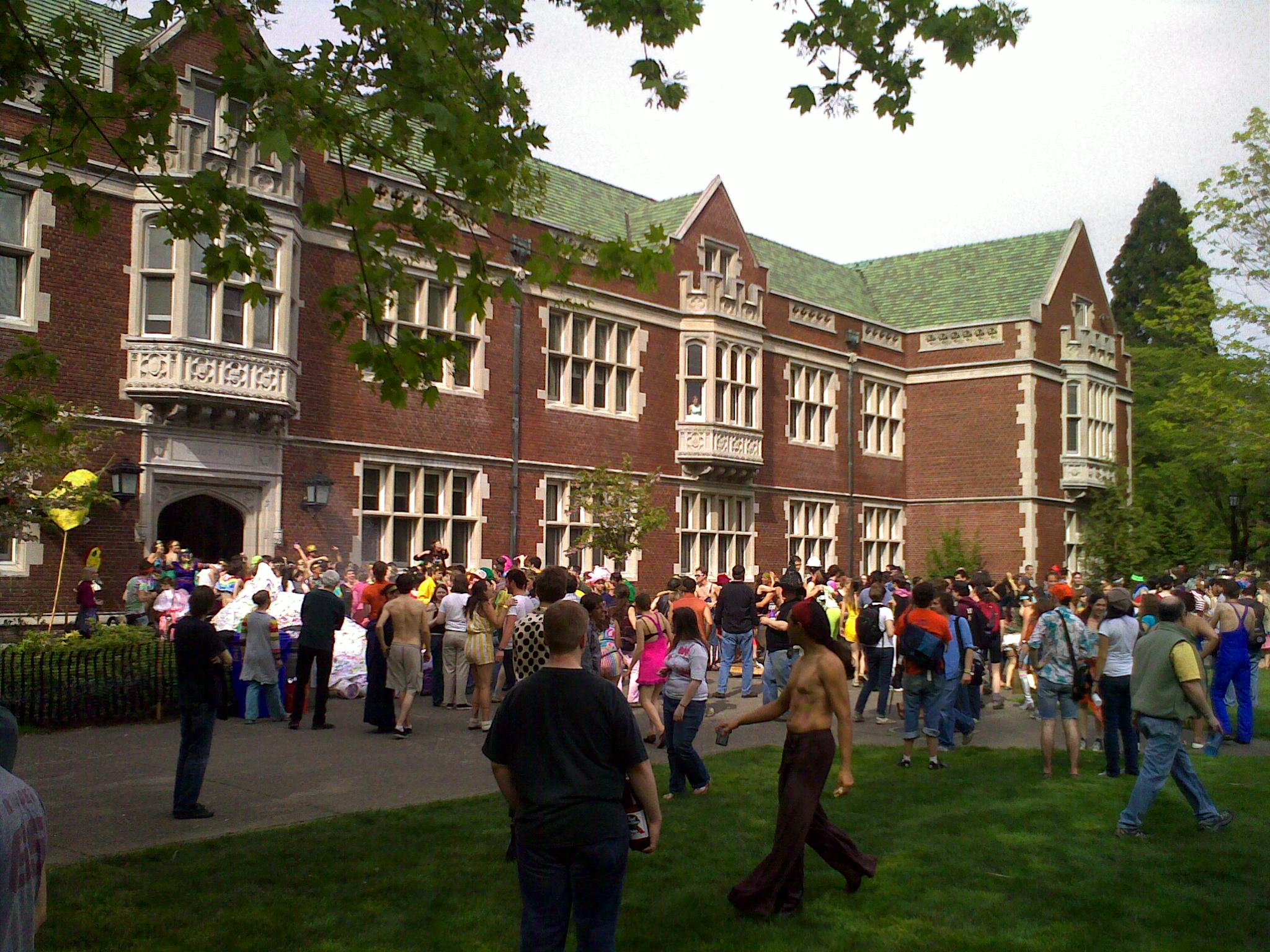
Parade of students in 2009

Renn Fayre is an annual three-day celebration that occurs on the campus of Reed College in Portland, Oregon. The festival was originally a one-day Renaissance Fayre, held during the spring semester for the purpose of recreating the Renaissance era. On the final days of class instruction, seniors march from the library to the registrar's office to celebrate the completion of their theses and to receive congratulations from the institution's President. The parade of students begins a weekend festival that has featured a variety of activities and forms of expression, including a fire show, fireworks, food, a giant slide and skate ramp, handicraft, lube wrestling, nude students covered by blue paint known as "Picts", Glow Opera, and other sports.

== Drug use and controversy ==
In 2008, Willamette Week reported on the tolerance of drug use during the festival. The article "inflamed" students and faculty, generating hundreds of comments, some of which were critical of the publication. Willamette Week revisited the story in 2009, concluding that little had changed, with similar activities taking place and a continued tolerance of drug use. In response, the school's spokesman stated: "We have a moral, legal and institutional responsibility to report serious violations. If we didn't see it and nobody points it out to us, we can't do anything. We've taken it seriously in more instances in the past year. We've gotten the Portland PD involved more." The spokesman also insisted that the college improved crowd control by limiting the number of festival participants and examines its alcohol and drug policy on a "pretty regular basis".

== See also ==
- Culture of Portland, Oregon
