= 2008 Oregon Democratic presidential primary =

2008 Oregon Democratic presidential primaries
- May 20, 2008

Candidate	Barack Obama	Hillary Clinton
Home state	Illinois	New York
Delegate count	31	21
Popular vote	375,385	259,825
Percentage	58.52%	40.50%
- Primary results by county Obama: 40–50% 50–60% 60–70% Clinton: 40–50% 50–60% 60–70%

The 2008 Oregon Democratic presidential primary was a mail-only primary in the U.S. state of Oregon. Ballots were mailed to registered Democratic voters between May 2 and May 6, 2008. To be counted, all ballots had to have been received by county elections offices by 8:00 p.m. PDT on May 20, 2008. It was a closed primary and voters had to have registered as Democrats by April 29, 2008, to be eligible to vote in any of the partisan races. Barack Obama won the presidential primary with 58% of the vote.

At the time of the election there were 868,371 registered Democratic voters; 73.56% of them voted in this election.

== Delegates ==
Oregon had a total of 65 delegates at the 2008 Democratic National Convention. Of these, 52 pledged delegates were allocated proportionally to one of the Democratic presidential candidates in the primary. (The delegates themselves, along with nine alternates, were elected at a later date.)

The 52 pledged delegates were allocated as follows:

- Oregon's 1st congressional district: 7
- Oregon's 2nd congressional district: 5
- Oregon's 3rd congressional district: 9
- Oregon's 4th congressional district: 7
- Oregon's 5th congressional district: 6
- At-large: 12
- Pledged superdelegates: 6

Oregon also had 13 unpledged superdelegates, all of whom endorsed Obama (though Kulongoski and Hooley originally endorsed Clinton in the primaries):

- Governor Ted Kulongoski
- U.S. Senator Ron Wyden
- Congressman David Wu
- Congressman Earl Blumenauer
- Congressman Peter DeFazio
- Congresswoman Darlene Hooley
- Secretary of State Bill Bradbury (by association with the Democratic Association of Secretaries of State)
- DNC member Frank Dixon
- DNC member Jenny Greenleaf
- DNC member Wayne Kinney
- DNC member Gail Rasmussen
- DNC member and DPO chair Meredith Wood Smith
- Former Governor Barbara Roberts (unpledged delegate, elected at the state Democratic convention on June 21)

== Polling ==
Source	Date	Clinton	Obama	Other	Undecided
SurveyUSA	May 16–May 18, 2008	42%	55%	2%	1%
Suffolk	May 15–May 17, 2008	41%	45%	--	8%
American Research Group	May 14–May 15, 2008	45%	50%	--	5%
Public Policy Polling (D)	May 10–May 11, 2008	39%	53%	--	7%
SurveyUSA	May 9–May 11, 2008	43%	54%	2%	2%
Davis, Hibbitts & Midghall	May 8–May 10, 2008	35%	55%	--	10%
Rasmussen Reports	May 1, 2008	39%	51%	--	10%
SurveyUSA	April 28–April 30, 2008	44%	50%	2%	4%
SurveyUSA	April 4–April 6, 2008	42%	52%	4%	3%
Riley Research Poll	January 21–January 29, 2008	36%	28%	18%	13%

=== May 18 Obama rally ===
On May 18, 2008, Barack Obama addressed a rally in Tom McCall Waterfront Park in Portland, with a crowd estimated at 72,000 (60,000 inside the gates and another 12,000 outside). This crowd was the largest ever to greet Obama, surpassing his previous record of 35,000 people in Pennsylvania. It was also likely the largest-ever political rally in Oregon, surpassing the John Kerry rally in 2004, which drew 50,000. Large, media-attracting rallies and meetings such as this were noted to make a substantial difference in electorate enthusiasm and volunteer sign-ups for both Democratic Party potential candidates.

== Results ==
Primary date: May 20, 2008

National pledged delegates determined: 52

2008 Oregon Democratic presidential primary Official Results
Candidate	Votes	Percentage	Delegates
Barack Obama	375,385	58.52%	31
Hillary Clinton	259,825	40.50%	21
Write-in	6,289	0.98%	0
Total	638,790	100.00%	52

== See also ==
- 2008 Democratic Party presidential primaries
- 2008 Oregon Republican presidential primary
