= Pixelworks =

Pixelworks, Inc.
- Company type: Public
- Traded as: Nasdaq: PXLW; Russell Microcap Index component
- Industry: Semiconductor - Integrated Circuits
- Founded: 1997; 29 years ago
- Headquarters: San Jose, California
- Key people: Todd DeBonis (president and CEO) Richard Miller (EVP of Technology)
- Products: video and pixel processing semiconductors and software for digital video applications
- Website: www.pixelworks.com

Pixelworks, Inc. was founded in 1997 and is based in San Jose, California. Pixelworks provides video and pixel processing semiconductors and software. The company also provides digital display, projection devices and digital signage.

== Products ==
The company’s primary product category is integrated circuits for image processing, for post processing video signals, for providing network capability for display systems, and for video conferencing, video surveillance and other industrial video applications.

=== Leadership ===
It was co-founded by Allen Alley, an Oregon politician. Todd DeBonis is the CEO and president of the company.
