= Colin Diver =

American lawyer and university president (born 1943)

14th President of Reed College
- In office October 5, 2002 – 2010
- Preceded by: Peter Steinberger (acting)
- Succeeded by: John Kroger

Dean of the University of Pennsylvania Law School
- In office 1989–1999
- Preceded by: Robert Mundheim
- Succeeded by: Charles W. Mooney Jr.

Personal details
- Born: December 29, 1943 (age 82) Boston, Massachusetts, U.S.
- Education: Amherst College (BA); Harvard University (LLB)

Colin S. Diver (born December 29, 1943) is an American lawyer and university president who was the president of Reed College in Portland, Oregon. He was also the dean of the University of Pennsylvania Law School from 1989 to 1999.

== Early life and education ==
Diver was born in Boston. He received his B.A., summa cum laude, from Amherst College in 1965, where he currently serves as a trustee. He later received an LL.B., magna cum laude, from Harvard Law School in 1968. He holds an honorary degree from Amherst.

== Career ==
Diver served as special counsel to the office of Boston mayor Kevin White and then held a series of positions in Massachusetts state government, including assistant secretary of consumer affairs and undersecretary in the Massachusetts Executive Office for Administration and Finance. Diver then worked for 14 years as a faculty member at Boston University School of Law, where he served as associate dean (1985–88) and dean (1988–89). He was a visiting professor at the Harvard Kennedy School and has held joint appointments in public policy at the Wharton School of the University of Pennsylvania and the Boston University School of Management.

Diver was named the Reed College's 14th president on October 5, 2002, replacing acting president Peter Steinberger, dean of faculty, and succeeding Steven Koblik, who departed Reed to run the Huntington Library in San Marino, California. Diver stepped down in 2012.

Under Diver's leadership, the college added a new major in environmental studies, hired additional faculty, created the office of institutional diversity, and saw the four-year graduation rate reach a new high. Diver presided during a period of significant volatility in the stock market. Despite being launched during a recession, however, Reed's centennial campaign has raised more than $165 million towards its goal of $200 million.

Diver's area of expertise includes administrative law. Prior to Reed, he was dean of the University of Pennsylvania Law School from 1989 to 1999.

=== Notable activities ===
Though Reed College, an exclusively undergraduate institution, does not have a law school, in September 2005 it was announced that Diver would be the coach of the inaugural Reed College mock trial team.

In 2005, Diver submitted an article to the Atlantic Monthly outlining the adverse effects of the U.S. News & World Report college ranking system, called Is There Life After Rankings? The article outlines why Reed College chooses not to participate in the rankings competition process, and addresses the implication that non-participation necessarily handicaps colleges in competing for student applications and enrollment. In 2022, he published a book titled Breaking Ranks on the issue.

Among his publications, Diver is co-author of a multiple-edition textbook entitled "Administrative Law: Cases and Materials."

== Personal life ==
Diver and his wife lived and raised their sons in Boston during the 1960s in a neighborhood that was undergoing rapid gentrification. Their experiences with school desegregation and racial equality were chronicled in The New York Times journalist J. Anthony Lukas's Pulitzer Prize-winning book Common Ground. This in turn became a 1990 made-for-TV movie of the same name.

== Notable works ==
- Administrative Law: Cases and Materials, 4th ed. Aspen Pub., Inc. (with R. Cass & J. Beermann) (2002)
- "Genophobia: What Is Wrong with Genetic Discrimination?" Univ. of Penn. Law Rev. 149:1441 (2001)
- "Seeking Higher Ground," Media Studies J. 12:120 (1998) (with Joan M. Diver)
- "Israeli Administrative Law from an American Perspective, " Law and Government in Israel, 4:1 (1997)
- "Regulatory Precision, " in Making Regulatory Policy (K. Hawkins & J. Thomas eds. 1989)
- "Presidential Powers, " American Univ. Law Rev., 36:519 (1987)
- "No Compromises, " J. of Policy Analysis & Mgt., 5:645 (1986)
- Diver, Colin (2022). Breaking Ranks: How the Rankings Industry Rules Higher Education and What to Do about It. Baltimore, MD: Johns Hopkins University Press. doi:10.56021/9781421443065. ISBN 9781421443058. OCLC 1246674491.
