= Ann Lininger =

American politician (born 1968)

Judge of the Clackamas County Circuit Court
- Incumbent
- Assumed office August 28, 2017

Member of the Oregon House of Representatives from the 38th district
- In office January 29, 2014 – August 15, 2017
- Preceded by: Chris Garrett
- Succeeded by: Andrea Salinas

Personal details
- Born: 1968 (age 57–58)
- Party: Democratic
- Education: Yale University (BA); New York University (JD)

Ann Lininger (/ˈlaɪnɪŋər/ LY-ning-ər; born 1968) is an American attorney, politician, and jurist serving as a judge on the circuit court in Clackamas County in the U.S. state of Oregon. Prior to being appointed as judge, she was a member of the Oregon House of Representatives from the 38th district, which includes most of Lake Oswego and portions of southwestern Portland.

== Early life and education ==
Lininger was born in Ashland, Oregon. She earned a Bachelor of Arts degree from Yale University and a Juris Doctor from the New York University School of Law.

== Career ==
Lininger served as a judicial law clerk for federal judges on the U.S. District Court and the U.S. Court of Appeals for the 10th Circuit. She practiced law at Earthjustice and at Hogan Lovells in Colorado. After returning to Oregon, Lininger practiced law at Legal Aid Services of Oregon, Oregon Iron Works, Buckley Law, and the Metropolitan Public Defender. She served as a program officer at the Meyer Memorial Trust, directing programs on financing charitable real estate projects and promoting access to affordable housing.

== Politics ==
In early 2009, Lininger ran against Molalla City Councilor, James Needham to fill Martha Schrader's seat on the Clackamas County Board of Commissioners when Schrader was appointed to the Oregon Senate. Lininger won a contested election in 2010 to hold the seat, and she did not seek re-election in 2012. Lininger subsequently worked as general counsel and vice president at Oregon Iron Works.

In December 2013, Chris Garrett resigned from his seat in the Oregon House of Representatives to take a seat on the Oregon Court of Appeals. In January 2014, county commissioners of Multnomah County and Clackamas County (both of which are represented by the House seat) unanimously voted to appoint Lininger to fill Garrett's seat.

Lininger won re-election to her legislative seat in 2014 without opposition. She was named a co-chair of a joint legislative committee to oversee the implementation of Ballot Measure 91, which legalized marijuana and she served on the House Judiciary and House Revenue committees. Lininger won a contested election in 2016 to retain her legislative seat, and she thereafter served as Chair of the House Economic Development and Trade Committee, Co-chair of the Joint Committee on Marijuana Regulation, and as a member of the House Judiciary Committee. From 2014-2016, Lininger served as an assistant majority leader in the House Democrats' leadership team.

=== Circuit Court ===
In July 2017, Oregon Governor Kate Brown appointed Lininger to the circuit court in Clackamas County. She resigned from the House effective August 15 and was sworn in on August 28.

== Personal ==
Lininger and her husband, David White, have two children and live in Portland.

== Electoral history ==
2014 Oregon State Representative, 38th district
Party	Candidate	Votes	%
Democratic	Ann Lininger	20,405	96.4
Write-in		757	3.6
Total votes		21,162	100%

2016 Oregon State Representative, 38th district
Party	Candidate	Votes	%
Democratic	Ann Lininger	26,675	69.7
Republican	Patrick De Klotz	11,533	30.1
Write-in		68	0.2
Total votes		38,276	100%

2018 Judge of the Oregon Circuit Court, 5th District, Position 2
Party	Candidate	Votes	%
Nonpartisan	Ann Lininger	95,045	97.7
Write-in		2,201	2.3
Total votes		97,246	100%
