= Audrey Bilger =

American academic

- Bilger in 2024

16th President of Reed College
- Incumbent
- Assumed office July 1, 2019
- Preceded by: John Kroger

Personal details
- Born: Audrey Sue Bilger West Virginia, U.S.
- Spouse: Cheryl Pawelski (m. 2008)
- Education: Oklahoma State University (BA); University of Virginia (MA, PhD)
- Website: audreybilger.com

Academic background
- Thesis: Laughing feminism: Comic strategies in Burney, Edgeworth, and Austen (1992)
- Doctoral advisor: Patricia Meyer Spacks; Susan Fraiman

Academic work
- Discipline: English literature
- Sub-discipline: Women literature
- Institutions: Oberlin College; Claremont McKenna College; Pomona College; Reed College

Audrey Bilger is the 16th and current president of Reed College. She is former vice president and dean of the college at Pomona College and previously was a professor of literature and faculty director of the Center for Writing and Public Discourse at Claremont McKenna College.

== Education and career ==
Bilger holds a B.A. in philosophy from Oklahoma State University and an M.A. and Ph.D. in English from the University of Virginia. As a graduate student at the University of Virginia, she was the program coordinator of the Women's Center and a DJ at the college radio station, WTJU, Charlottesville. At the University of Virginia, Bilger studied under the direction of Patricia Meyer Spacks and Susan Fraiman and was awarded a Ph.D. in Victorian literature in 1992. From 1992 to 1994, she was a visiting assistant professor of English at Oberlin College.

Bilger currently serves on the Ms. magazine Committee of Scholars and is the Gender and Sexuality section editor of The Los Angeles Review of Books. She is on the editorial boards of Pickering and Chatto's Gender and Genre Series and The Burney Journal.

Bilger's work focuses on comedy, Jane Austen, the English novel, feminist theory, popular culture, and gender and sexuality. In addition to her traditional academic writing, she has written for the Los Angeles Times, The Paris Review, The Women's Review of Books, The Los Angeles Review of Books and ROCKRGRL. Bilger is a regular contributor to Bitch magazine, Ms. magazine and the Ms. Blog, where she frequently covers issues pertaining to same-sex marriage and LGBT rights.

In her book on Jane Austen and her contemporaries, Laughing Feminism, Bilger coined the term "Enlightenment feminist humor" to identify a tradition of anti-patriarchal satire and comedy that begins in the late seventeenth century and continues through Austen and beyond. Enlightenment feminist humor mocks the idea that men are superior to women and promotes a more egalitarian gender system.

Bilger's most recent book, Here Come the Brides! Reflections on Lesbian Love and Marriage, co-edited with Michele Kort (Seal Press, 2012), is a collection of essays, stories and visual images that takes a "multidimensional look at how opening up the traditional order of 'man and wife' to include the possibility of 'wife and wife' is altering our social landscape." In a December 2009 radio interview Bilger asserted that advocates of same-sex marriage should begin to emphasize positive changes, instead of being afraid to say that same-sex marriage does not change anything about the institution of marriage. Bilger has written extensively on the legal battle regarding same-sex marriage and has covered the Proposition 8 trial in California for Ms. On August 12, 2010, she was a guest on Warren Olney's To the Point and discussed the feminist implications of Judge Vaughn Walker's historic ruling on the unconstitutionality of Proposition 8.

== Personal life ==
Bilger was born in West Virginia and her family relocated to Oklahoma before starting the seventh grade.

Bilger is married to Cheryl Pawelski, founder of Omnivore Recordings.

== See also ==
- List of presidents of Reed College

== Selected works ==
=== Books ===
- Here Come the Brides! Reflections on Lesbian Love and Marriage, an anthology, co-edited with Michele Kort, Seal Press (March, 2012), ISBN 9781580053921
- Editor, Broadview Literary Texts critical edition of The Art of Ingeniously Tormenting (1753). Jane Collier. Toronto: Broadview Press, 2003, ISBN 9781551110967
- Laughing Feminism: Subversive Comedy in Frances Burney, Maria Edgeworth, and Jane Austen. Detroit: Wayne State University Press, 1998; paperback, 2002, ISBN 9780814330548

=== Selected essays and interviews ===
- "Novels Are Not the Only Books," Review of Jeanette Winterson's Why Be Happy When You Can Be Normal? Los Angeles Review of Books, April 20, 2012.
- "The Marriage Prop," Los Angeles Review of Books, February 12, 2012. (Cited by The New Yorker's "The Book Bench", February 15, 2012)
- "But are they any Good?" Review of True Confessions: Feminist Professors Tell Stories Out of School, Ed. Susan Gubar (New York: W. W. Norton, 2011), Women's Review of Books, (November/December 2011), pp. 3–5
- "Just Like a Woman," Review of A Jane Austen Education: How Six Novels Taught Me about Love, Friendship, and the Things that Really Matter, William Deresiewicz (Penguin, 2011) and Rachel M. Brownstein, Why Jane Austen? (Columbia University Press, 2011), The Los Angeles Review of Books, 5 September 2011
- "Redefining Wife," Women's Media Center Blog, February 12, 2010
- "Why Straight People Should Be Following the Prop 8 Trial," Huffington Post, January 22, 2010
- "Branding Dear Jane." Review of Jane's Fame: How Jane Austen Conquered the World. Claire Harman. (Henry Holt and Company, 2009). Women's Review of Books, Vol. 27, Issue 6 (November/December 2010), pp. 5–6 [Lead review essay]
- "The Grace Lee Project" [on documentary The Grace Lee Project], Bitch: Feminist Response to Pop Culture, 10-Year Anniversary issue, 2006
- "Laughing All the Way to the Polls: Political Women's Humor," Bitch: Feminist Response to Pop Culture, Fall 2005, pp. 48–53 (Syndicated online on AlterNet, 5 January 2006.)
- "An Hour with Michael Cunningham." Interview with Michael Cunningham. CMC Magazine, Spring 2003, p. 16-18.
- "The Common Guy." Bitch: Feminist Response to Pop Culture 18, Fall 2002, pp. 19–20 +87
- "Handkerchiefes of Praise." Review of Mad Madge: The Extraordinary Life of Margaret Cavendish, Duchess of Newcastle, The First Woman to Live by Her Pen. Katie Whitaker. (New York: Basic Books, 2002). The Women's Review of Books, March 2003: pp. 16–17
- "Off the Beaten Track." Review of Mary Wollstonecraft: A Revolutionary Life, Janet Todd (Columbia, 2000) and Frances Burney: A Literary Life, Janice Ferrar Thaddeus (St. Martins, 2000). The Women's Review of Books. November 2000: pp. 17–19
- Interview with Jeanette Winterson. The Paris Review 145 (1997–98): pp. 68–112
- "Only Connect." Review of Jeanette Winterson's Gut Symmetries. Los Angeles Times Book Review, 13 April 1997

Academic offices
Preceded by John Kroger	16th President of Reed College; 2019 – present	Incumbent
