= Bob Tiernan =

American politician

Chair of the Oregon Republican Party
- In office January 10, 2009 – January 22, 2011
- Preceded by: Vance Day
- Succeeded by: Allen Alley

Member of the Oregon House of Representatives from the 24th district
- In office January 1993 – January 1997
- Preceded by: Randy Miller
- Succeeded by: Richard Devlin

Personal details
- Born: May 24, 1955 (age 71) Coronado, California, U.S.
- Party: Republican
- Spouse: Susan
- Education: Oregon State University (BS); University of Puget Sound (JD); Georgetown University (LLM)

Bob Tiernan (born May 24, 1955) is an American politician and attorney. A member of the Republican Party, he served in the Oregon House of Representatives from January 1993 to January 1997, representing Oregon's 24th House district, in the early 1990s. The district, at the time included most of Lake Oswego and portions of southwestern Portland. He was chair of the Oregon Republican Party from 2009 to 2011.

== Education and business career ==
He earned a Bachelor of Science degree from Oregon State University, a Juris Doctor degree from the University of Puget Sound, and a Master of Laws degree from Georgetown University.

Tiernan worked as a corporate turn-around consultant.

== Political career ==
=== State House of Representatives ===
In 1992, he was elected to the Oregon House and served 2 two-year terms. In 1996, he lost to his 1994 opponent, Richard Devlin. In 2002, he ran for the Oregon State Senate to represent the 19th senate district, again facing Devlin, narrowly losing by a margin of 47% to 50%.

He served as chief petitioners on several successful statewide ballot measures, including Measure 11 (mandatory minimum sentences), Measure 8 (pension reform), and Measure 17 (prison labor), all in 1994.

=== Oregon Republican Party chair ===
In January 2009, he was elected as chair of the Oregon Republican Party and served until 2011, when he was succeeded by Allen Alley.

=== 2022 gubernatorial campaign ===
Tiernan ran for governor of Oregon in the 2022 election; 19 candidates ran in the Republican primary, with Tiernan and Christine Drazan being considered the top contenders. He loaned his campaign a half-million dollars. Shortly before his loss, Willamette Week highlighted that Tiernan had failed to pay $8,700 in property taxes owed on his investment property in Lake Oswego. Tiernan said that Clackamas County had not notified him of the tax debt, and he paid the past-due amount after the publication brought it to his attention.

During the primary campaign, Tiernan's ties to Oregon also came under scrutiny. In court papers filed in July 2020, as part of Tiernan's long-running feud with San Francisco Bay Area cyclists, he asserted through his lawyers that he had lived in Diablo, California, "from 1963 to 1980, and again from 2006 to present"; The Oregonian noted that this raised questions about whether Tiernan had lived in Oregon for the preceding three years, a requirement for candidates for governor under the state Constitution. In a sworn deposition in the case, taken in July 2021, Tiernan estimated that he spent 60% of his time in California and 40% of his time in Oregon. Tiernan also ran for office in California in 2014. Asked about the issue in May 2022, Tiernan said his primary residence is Lake Oswego (where he brought the home in September 2019), but that he spent 30% of his time in California caring for his elderly parents; he also said that his wife Carissa Sauer is a resident of Washington state, where she owns a home in Battle Ground.

In the May 2022 Republican primary, Drazan defeated Tiernan. Drazan received 85,255 votes, Tiernan 66,089 votes, Stan Pulliam 41,123 votes, and Bridget Barton 40,886 votes, with the other candidates gaining the remainder.

== Personal life ==
Tiernan and his wife Susan have three children.

Party political offices
Preceded by Vance Day	Chair of the Oregon Republican Party; 2009–2011	Succeeded by Allen Alley
