= Peter Steinberger =

American political philosopher

Peter James Steinberger is a professor of political philosophy at Reed College. He was the thirteenth president of Reed College, preceding Colin Diver. Steinberger has served on the Reed College faculty since 1977. While at Reed College, Steinberger has taught his classes primarily in the same room for 35 years. He has also authored editorial columns in both the local and national press, including The Oregonian, The Wall Street Journal, The Christian Science Monitor, and The New York Times. Aside from his books, he has also published numerous articles in political philosophy, with a special emphasis on the work and impact of Hegel in the leading journals of Political Science, including the American Political Science Review.

== Career ==
=== Early education ===
- Ph.D. University of California, Riverside, 1976
- M.A. Fordham University, 1972
- B.A. Fordham University, 1970

=== Positions held ===
- Dean of the Faculty, Reed College, 1997–2001, 2002–2010.
- Acting President, Reed College, 2001-02 academic year.
- Chair, Department of Political Science, Reed College, various terms between 1979 and 1990.

=== Books ===
- Ideology and the Urban Crisis (Albany: State University of New York Press, 1985).
- Logic and Politics: Hegel's Philosophy of Right (New Haven and London: Yale University Press, 1988).
- The Concept of Political Judgment (Chicago and London: University of Chicago Press, 1993).
- The Idea of the State (Cambridge and New York: Cambridge University Press, 2005).
- The Problem With God (New York, Columbia University Press, 2013).
- The Politics of Objectivity (Cambridge: Cambridge University Press, 2015).
