= David Bragdon =

American politician

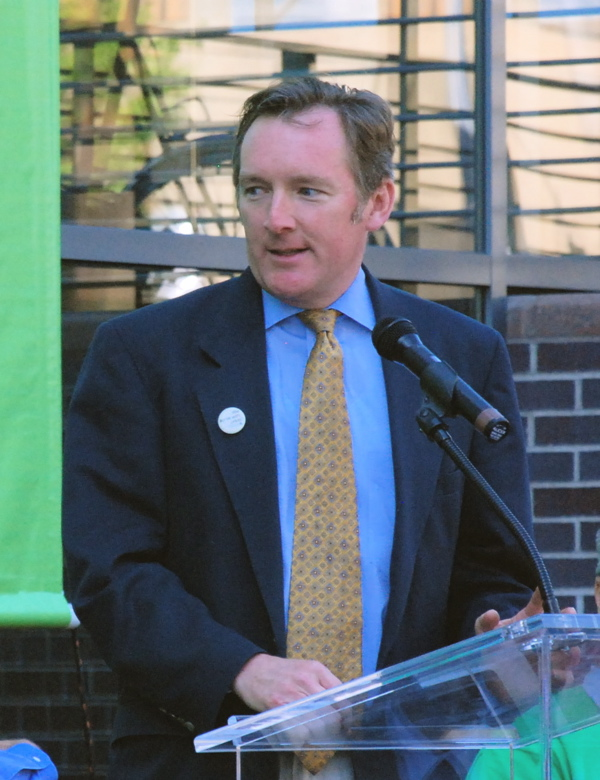
- Bragdon in 2009
- Born: David L. Bragdon; June 20, 1959 (age 67); New York, New York, U.S.
- Education: Harvard, Reed College
- Occupations: Politician, Civic leader
- Father: Paul Bragdon

David L. Bragdon (born June 20, 1959) is an American politician and civic leader in the U.S. states of Oregon and New York. From 2003 to 2010, he was the elected president of the Metro Council, a regional government in the Portland metropolitan area. He served as Director of the Mayor's Office of Long-Term Planning and Sustainability in the administration of Mayor Michael R. Bloomberg of New York City. He is currently executive director of TransitCenter, Inc., a New York-based non-profit organization which commissions and conducts research and advocacy related to urban transportation.

== Personal ==
Bragdon is the oldest son of former Reed College president Paul Bragdon and educator Nancy Bragdon. His brother, Peter Bragdon, is a sportswear executive who was Oregon Governor Ted Kulongoski's chief of staff in the early 2000s. His sister, Susan Bragdon, is an attorney specializing in intellectual property related for food and agriculture.

== Early life and education ==
Bragdon was raised in New York. He was 12 when his family moved from New York City to Portland. He attended high school at Catlin Gabel School, graduating in 1977. He graduated from Harvard University with a bachelor's degree with honors in government in 1982 and obtained a Master of Arts in Liberal Studies from Reed College in 2009.

== Career ==
Prior to entering public service, Bragdon worked in international trade and freight transportation in the private sector. He opened the first Nike office in Singapore where he oversaw the company's Southeast Asia shipping, worked as a maritime vessel agent at Columbia River ports, represented Evergreen Airlines, in India and the Soviet Union, and worked as a marketing manager for the Port of Portland. He also drove a taxicab in Portland for one year, in 2000.

Bragdon ran for the Oregon House of Representatives in 1996, but lost to Chris Beck in the Democratic primary.

Bragdon was first elected to the Metro Council as a district councilor in 1998. He was elected by the voters regionwide as the first Metro Council President in 2002, with 58 percent of the vote (taking office January 2003), and was re-elected in 2006 without an opponent. His accomplishments in office included the passage of a $227.4 million bond measure in 2006 which allowed for the preservation of thousands of acres of natural areas in Oregon. Because of this work he was rewarded the National Arbor Day excellence in Urban Forestry Leadership Award in 2010.

Bragdon was rumored to be a leading potential candidate for mayor of Portland in 2008, but in response to speculation that he would run, he issued a satirical press release disavowing intent to run for mayor of Portland or of any other city in the region that year. He is a train enthusiast, and as a kid wrote a booklet for TriMet about bus riding and how to use the TriMet bus system. He hosted a Sunday morning television show called "Outlook Portland" in 2008–09. He has also performed with Linda Austin's Boris and Natasha Dancers in "Catnip" as part of the Dance United benefit for Oregon Ballet Theater at the Keller Auditorium.

In 2010, moved from Portland to New York City to accept a job as Director of the mayor's Office of Long-Term Planning and Sustainability in the administration of Mayor Michael R. Bloomberg. He left that position in 2012 to become director of planning of a project to revitalize parkland around Jamaica Bay.

Since 2013, Bragdon has been executive director of TransitCenter, a New York-based non-profit organization which commissions and conducts research and advocacy related to urban transportation.

== See also ==
- Land use in Oregon
