= Andrea Salinas =

American politician (born 1969)

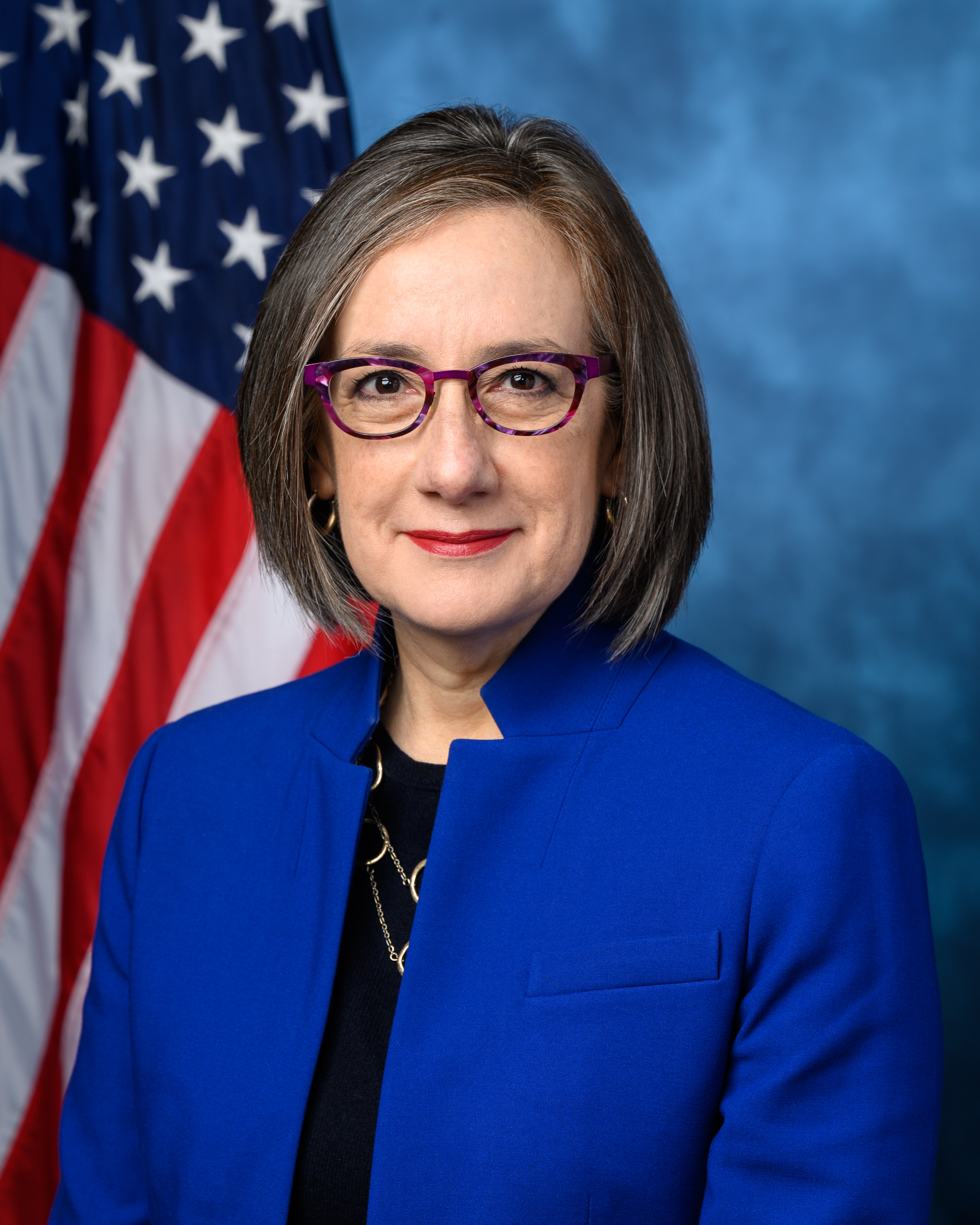
- Official portrait, 2023

Member of the U.S. House of Representatives from Oregon's 6th district
- Incumbent
- Assumed office January 3, 2023
- Preceded by: Constituency established

Member of the Oregon House of Representatives from the 38th district
- In office September 12, 2017 – January 9, 2023
- Preceded by: Ann Lininger
- Succeeded by: Daniel Nguyen

Personal details
- Born: Andrea Rose Salinas; December 6, 1969 (age 56) San Mateo, California, U.S.
- Party: Democratic
- Spouse: Chris Ramey
- Children: 1
- Education: University of California, Berkeley (BA)
- Website: House website Campaign website
- Salinas's voice Salinas supporting the PRO Act. Recorded March 7, 2023

Andrea Rose Salinas (born December 6, 1969) is an American politician serving as the U.S. representative for Oregon's 6th congressional district since 2023. Oregon's 6th congressional district includes all of Yamhill and Polk counties, the part of Marion County that includes Salem and Woodburn, a small piece of Beaverton, and the suburban communities to the southwest of Portland, including Tigard, Tualatin, and Sherwood.

A member of the Democratic Party, Salinas previously served as the Oregon State Representative for the 38th district, which includes the City of Lake Oswego and portions of southwestern Portland, from 2017 to 2023. She is one of the first two Hispanic women (alongside Lori Chavez-DeRemer) elected to the United States Congress from Oregon.

== Early life, education, and career ==
Salinas's father emigrated from Mexico. She was born in San Mateo, California, and grew up in Pleasant Hill. She graduated from the University of California, Berkeley.

In 2004, Salinas registered as a federal lobbyist on behalf of the National Treasury Employees Union. She lobbied for two years before moving to Portland, where she later lobbied from 2015 to 2017.

== Early political career ==
After graduating from Berkeley, Salinas was a legislative aide to U.S. Senator Harry Reid and U.S. Representatives Pete Stark and Darlene Hooley. She then worked as the legislative director of the Oregon Environmental Council. She left the Oregon Environmental Council to start her own legislative consulting practice. Before joining the Oregon House of Representatives, she was the Oregon Vice President of Strategies 360, a political consulting firm.

In September 2017, Salinas was appointed to fill the vacancy in district 38 of the Oregon House of Representatives created when Ann Lininger was appointed to the Clackamas County Circuit Court. Salinas completed Lininger's term, and was reelected in 2018 and 2020.

In the 81st Oregon Legislative Assembly, she served in the leadership team as the majority whip. She also was the chair of the House Committee on Health Care.

== U.S. House of Representatives ==
=== 2022 election ===
In November 2021, Salinas announced her candidacy to represent Oregon's new congressional district. This announcement came with controversy, as she did not live in the district. Salinas said that if she won the race, she would move into the district.

On November 8, 2022, Salinas won the open seat with 50.0% of the vote, defeating Republican Mike Erickson. After the election, Erickson filed a lawsuit against Salinas over a television ad. The lawsuit initially sought to block her from taking office. He sued under a state law that allows a judge to set aside election results if the judge determines that a false statement by the victor swayed voters enough to change the election's outcome. During a December hearing, Erickson indicated through his attorney that he did not wish to overturn the election results, but was still seeking $800,000 in damages because of Salinas campaign ads that said he had been charged with drug possession. Salinas was represented by the Portland law firm Markowitz Herbold PC and the Elias Law Group. In 2025, a judge ruled that Salinas did not violate state law with the ad.

In the 118th Congress, Salinas was the freshman representative for the Congressional Hispanic Caucus.

=== Caucus memberships ===
- Congressional Equality Caucus
- Bipartisan Rural Health Caucus
- Black Maternal Health Caucus
- Congressional Progressive Caucus
- Congressional Hispanic Caucus
- New Democrat Coalition
- Congressional Coalition on Adoption Caucus
- Congressional Freethought Caucus

=== Committee assignments ===
- Committee on Agriculture
- Committee on Science, Space, and Technology

=== Tenure ===
Salinas has cosponsored legislation to provide $300 million in federal funding for mental health services in public schools. In 2023, Salinas and Diana Harshbarger introduced a bipartisan bill to provide $10 million for telehealth services in rural areas.

== Personal life ==
Salinas is Roman Catholic. She is married to Chris Ramey. They have one child.

== Electoral history ==
2018 Oregon State Representative, 38th district
Party	Candidate	Votes	%
Democratic	Andrea Salinas	25,974	97.6
Write-in		631	2.4
Total votes		26,605	100%

2020 Oregon State Representative, 38th district
Party	Candidate	Votes	%
Democratic	Andrea Salinas	31,911	72.4
Republican	Patrick Castles	12,152	27.6
Write-in		43	0.1
Total votes		44,106	100%

2022 US House of Representatives, Oregon's 6th congressional district
Party	Candidate	Votes	%
Democratic	Andrea Salinas	147,156	50.0
Republican	Mike Erickson	139,946	47.5
Constitution	Larry D McFarland	6,762	2.3
Write-in		513	0.2
Total votes		294,377	100%

2024 US House of Representatives, Oregon's 6th congressional district
Party	Candidate	Votes	%
Democratic	Andrea Salinas	180,869	53.3
Republican	Mike Erickson	157,634	46.5
Write-in		562	0.2
Total votes		339,065	100%

== See also ==
- List of Hispanic and Latino Americans in the United States Congress

U.S. House of Representatives
New constituency	Member of the U.S. House of Representatives from Oregon's 6th congressional district 2023–present	Incumbent
U.S. order of precedence (ceremonial)
Preceded by Delia Ramirez	United States representatives by seniority 345th	Succeeded by Hillary Scholten
