= Christopher L. Garrett =

American judge (born 1973)

Chris Garrett
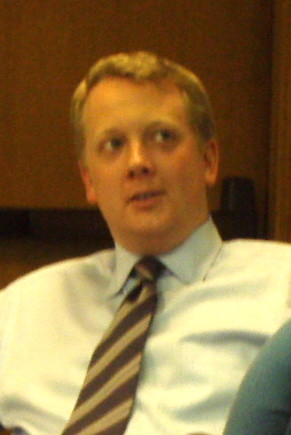

Justice of the Oregon Supreme Court
- Incumbent
- Assumed office January 1, 2019
- Appointed by: Kate Brown
- Preceded by: Rives Kistler

Member of the Oregon House of Representatives from the 38th district
- In office January 2009 – January 2013
- Preceded by: Greg Macpherson
- Succeeded by: Ann Lininger

Personal details
- Born: Christopher Lewis Garrett; December 26, 1973 (age 52) Portland, Oregon, U.S.
- Party: Democratic
- Education: Reed College (BA); University of Chicago (JD)

Christopher L. Garrett (born December 26, 1973) is a justice of the Oregon Supreme Court since January 1, 2019. Previously, he served on the Oregon Court of Appeals from 2013 to 2019, and was a member of the Oregon House of Representatives from 2008 to 2012.

== Early life and career ==
Garrett was born in Portland and graduated from Wilson High School. He earned a Bachelor of Arts in political science from Reed College in 1996 and a Juris Doctor from the University of Chicago Law School in 2000. He was formerly of counsel with Perkins Coie in Portland. He also teaches courses in legislation and regulation at Willamette College of Law.

== Political career ==
Garrett served as a senior policy advisor to Oregon State Senate President Peter Courtney and also worked in the office of Oregon State Senator Richard Devlin. In 2008, Garrett was the Democratic nominee in House District 38 for the open seat left by Greg Macpherson, who was not seeking re-election. In the general election, Garrett defeated Steve Griffith 62% to 38%. He was re-elected in 2010 and again in 2012.

Governor John Kitzhaber appointed Garrett to the Oregon Court of Appeals in December 2013, to succeed retiring judge David Schuman. Governor Kate Brown appointed him to the Oregon Supreme Court in December 2018; he succeeded retiring Justice Rives Kistler.

== Personal ==
Garrett lives in Portland.

== See also ==
- 75th Oregon Legislative Assembly

Legal offices
Preceded by Rives Kistler	Justice of the Oregon Supreme Court; 2019–present	Incumbent
