= List of presidents of Reed College =

Sixteen people have served as president of Reed College, a liberal arts college located in Portland, Oregon, United States. Seven have served in the role of acting president. The institution was led by an administrative committee from 1919 to 1921 and from July to December 1924.

== Presidents and acting presidents ==
*	Designates acting presidents
	Designates administrative committee

No.	Image	Name	Term start	Term end	Ref.
1		William Trufant Foster	1910	1919	
Administrative committee (1919–1921)
2		Richard F. Scholz	1921	1924	
Administrative committee (July–December 1924)
3		Norman F. Coleman	1925	1934	
4		Dexter Keezer	1934	1942	
5		Arthur F. Scott	1942	1945	
6		Peter H. Odegard	1945	1948	
7		E.B. MacNaughton	1948	1952	
8		Duncan S. Ballantine	1952	1954	
acting		Frank Loxley Griffin	1954	1956*	
9		Richard H. Sullivan	1956	1967	
acting		Byron L. Youtz	1967	1968*	
acting		Ross B. Thompson	1968 (Summer)*		
10		Victor G. Rosenblum	1968	1970	
acting		Ross B. Thompson	1970	1971	
11		Paul E. Bragdon	1971	1980	
acting		George A. Hay (Note: Hay was in charge of the college while Bragdon was on sabbatical from 1980 until 1981.)	1980	1981	
11		Paul E. Bragdon	1981	1988	
12		James L. Powell	1988	1991	
acting		William R. Haden	1991	1992	
13		Steven S. Koblik	1992	June 30, 2001 (Note: Resigns to head the Huntington Library.)	
acting		Peter J. Steinberger	July 1, 2001	June 30, 2002	
14		Colin Diver	July 1, 2002	June 30, 2012	
15		John Kroger	July 1, 2012	June 30, 2018	
acting		Hugh Porter	July 1, 2018	June 30, 2019	
16		Audrey Bilger	July 1, 2019	present	

Table notes:
