= Daniel Nguyen (politician) =

American politician

Member of the Oregon House of Representatives from the 38th district
- Incumbent
- Assumed office January 9, 2023
- Preceded by: Andrea Salinas

Personal details
- Born: Camas, Washington, U.S.
- Party: Democratic
- Education: Univ. of Puget Sound (BA); Marylhurst University (MBA)
- Occupation: Business owner
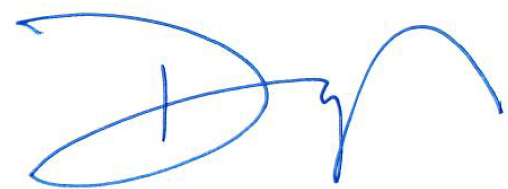
- Signature

Daniel Nguyen is an American Democratic politician serving the 38th district in the Oregon House of Representatives.

== Career ==
Nguyen founded a restaurant, Bambuza Vietnam Kitchen in 2008. As of 2022, it was the longest-running storefront in South Waterfront, Portland. He was elected to the Lake Oswego City Council in 2018, becoming the first person of color elected to the body. He also served as a director of the Immigration Counseling Service Business for a Better Portland and co-chair of the PCC School of Business & Entrepreneurship advisory committee.

Nguyen won the Democratic nomination for House District 38 in the Oregon House of Representatives; he beat his primary opponent by just 28 votes. He went on to defeat Republican opponent Alistair Firmin in the 2022 general election by a wide margin.

== Personal life ==
Nguyen was born to Vietnamese refugees who came to the United States in 1975 and settled in Camas, Washington, where Nguyen grew up. The family moved to Lake Oswego in 2010.

== Committees ==
He serves as the Vice Chair of the House Committee on Economic Development and Small Business, and the Joint Committee on Tax Expenditures, and also the Joint Committee On Ways and Means, in the Subcommitee Public Safety.

== Electoral history ==
2022 Oregon State Representative, 38th district
Party	Candidate	Votes	%
Democratic	Daniel Nguyen	25,949	68.0
Republican	Alistair Firmin	12,200	32.0
Write-in		22	0.1
Total votes		38,171	100%

2024 Oregon State Representative, 38th district
Party	Candidate	Votes	%
Democratic	Daniel Nguyen	30,385	97.9
Write-in		664	2.1
Total votes		31,049	100%
