= John Kroger =

American lawyer (born 1966)

John Richard Kroger
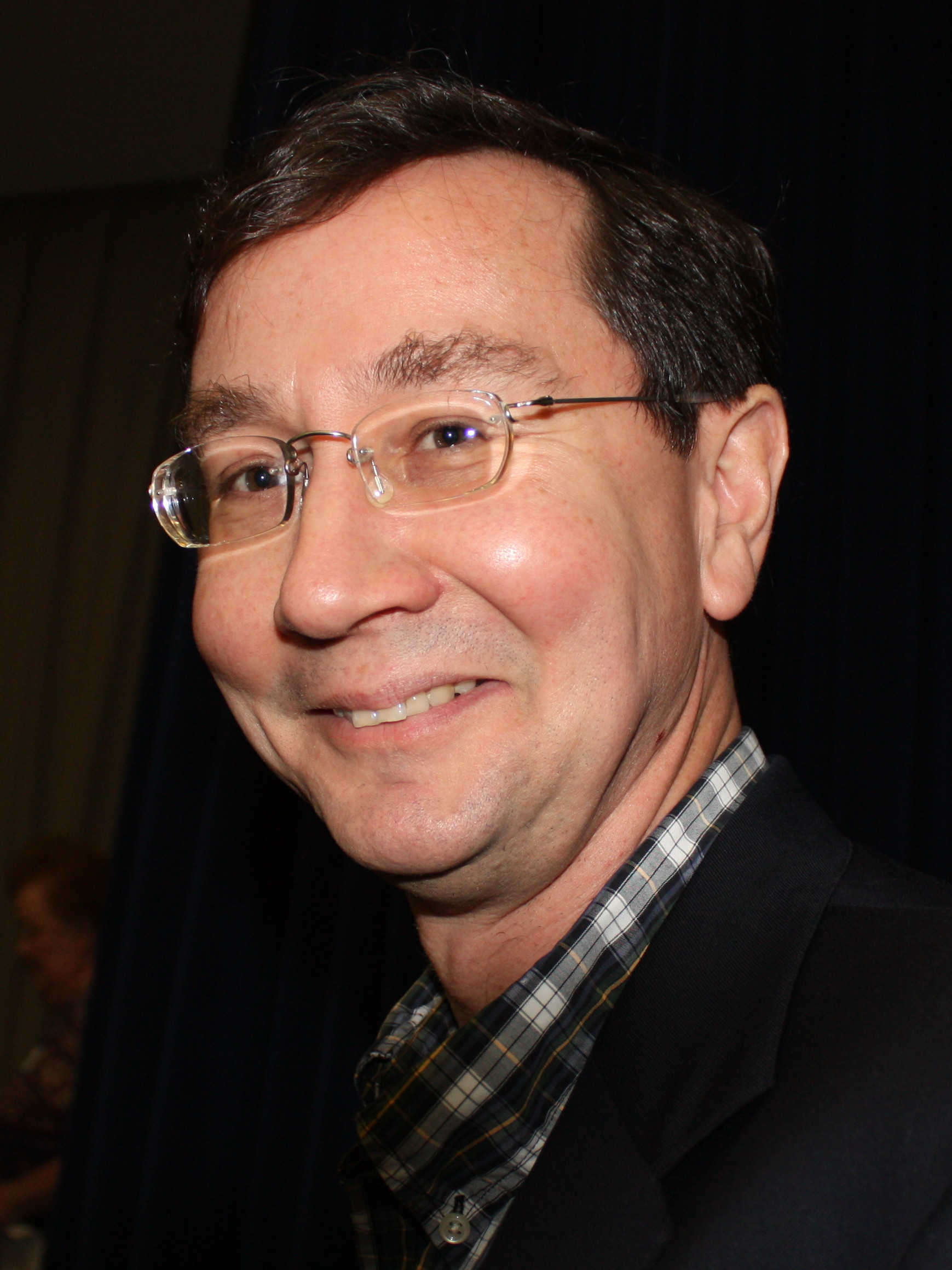

15th President of Reed College
- In office June 30, 2012 – June 29, 2018
- Preceded by: Colin Diver
- Succeeded by: Hugh Porter (acting); Audrey Bilger

16th Attorney General of Oregon
- In office January 5, 2009 – June 29, 2012
- Governor: Ted Kulongoski; John Kitzhaber
- Preceded by: Hardy Myers
- Succeeded by: Ellen Rosenblum

Personal details
- Born: 1966 (age 59–60) Ohio, U.S.
- Party: Democratic
- Spouse: Michele Toppe
- Education: Yale University; Harvard Law School
- Profession: Assistant United States Attorney (1997-2002); Law Professor (2002-2009); Attorney General of Oregon (2009–2012); President of Reed College (2012–2018)

Academic work
- Discipline: law and the government
- Sub-discipline: criminal law
- Institutions: Lewis & Clark College; Reed College; Harvard University

John Richard Kroger (born 1966) is an American lawyer who served as the president of Reed College. He served as Attorney General for the U.S. state of Oregon from 2009 to 2012. Prior to being elected in 2008, he had earlier served in the Marine Corps, was an Assistant United States Attorney in New York, and a law professor at Lewis & Clark Law School in Portland. He resigned as Attorney General effective June 29, 2012. On February 9, 2018, he announced that he would be resigning as President of Reed College come the conclusion of the academic year. After leaving Reed in June 2018, Kroger went to teach at Harvard University for the 2018–2019 academic year. On October 1, 2019, he became the first Chief Learning Officer of the United States Navy.

== Early life and career ==
Kroger was born in 1966 in Ohio, growing up in Indiana and then Texas. He served in a United States Marine Corps Recon Battalion in the United States Marine Corps after having joined in 1983 at the age of 17. During that time Kroger spent about five months on an assault carrier in the Pacific. He also underwent jungle warfare training in Panama. While he was in boot camp the United States invaded Grenada. Shortly thereafter Kroger volunteered to go to Lebanon, but in the aftermath of the 1983 Beirut barracks bombing attack, President Ronald Reagan withdrew U.S. forces before Kroger's unit was sent in.

He left the Marines in 1986, entered Yale College and studied philosophy, graduating in 1990 after winning the prestigious Truman Scholarship for public service leadership. Following graduation he moved to Washington, D.C., becoming a legislative assistant to then-Speaker of the United States House of Representatives Tom Foley (D–WA-5) and Senator Chuck Schumer (D-NY)

In 1991 he became Deputy Policy Director of Bill Clinton's 1992 presidential campaign, and after the campaign, as part of Clinton's transition team. He also served for a time as a senior policy analyst at the U.S. Treasury Department before returning to school, graduating magna cum laude from Harvard Law School in 1996.

Kroger clerked for a year for a federal appellate judge before joining the United States Attorney's office in Brooklyn, New York as a federal prosecutor.

During his years as a federal prosecutor, he won a high-profile conviction in a five-week Mafia multiple homicide trial against Gregory Scarpa Jr. He also handled numerous drug trafficking cases, including a conviction against drug kingpin Juan "La Puma" Rodriguez, for shipping 10 tons worth of cocaine across the United States each year for more than a decade. Kroger also handled white collar crime cases such as government corruption cases, and tax evasion cases.

In 2000, Kroger had an eight-week period blocked out for an upcoming drug kingpin trial, but when the trial schedule was moved back, Kroger took a three-month vacation. He bought a $350 Trek bicycle and started cycling west across the country, from New York to Oregon. After his return to New York, he was tapped to prosecute Alphonse Persico, boss of the Colombo organized crime family, on racketeering and money-laundering charges. While working that case, he became involved with the rescue and recovery effort after the September 11 attacks on the World Trade Center. In the day after the attacks, he reported to a round-the-clock command center in Manhattan, where he helped FBI agents run down leads by providing search warrants and subpoenas to investigate potential terrorist cells.

Both during his trip to Oregon and after his experiences post-9/11, he had come to realize he wanted to take a break from his career as a prosecutor and pursue teaching the law, and had fallen in love with Oregon. As a prosecutor, Kroger won the Director's Award from then-Attorney General Janet Reno, and by the time he left the office, had a 97% conviction rate of the criminals he charged.

When law professor Bill Williamson resigned from Lewis and Clark's law school in 2002 for health reasons, the college began looking for a new professor to teach criminal law. Kroger was given the job and relocated to Portland, where he currently resides.

Once at the college, Kroger taught only one semester of criminal procedure before he was asked to join the Justice Department's Enron Task Force and help investigate what at the time was the biggest corporate bankruptcy in U.S. history. For a little over a year, he led the investigation into Enron's broadband business – whose reported earnings on a future video-on-demand service, famously dubbed "Project Braveheart," contributed to the company's inflated stock price.

Eventually, Kroger and his team won indictments against seven men, including Ken Rice and Kevin Hannon, Enron's top two broadband executives. They pleaded guilty in 2004 and became government witnesses, helping to secure fraud convictions against Enron chairman Kenneth Lay and CEO Jeffrey Skilling.

Following the conclusion of his involvement in the Enron investigation, he returned to teaching at Lewis & Clark.

Kroger married Michele Toppe, the interim dean of students at Portland State University on August 1, 2009.

== Attorney general ==
On September 20, 2007, John Kroger announced his candidacy for Oregon Attorney General. Kroger was endorsed by former Oregon Governor John Kitzhaber, the Sierra Club, Oregon Small Business for Responsible Leadership, and the Carpenters Union. He defeated Greg Macpherson for the Democratic nomination in the May 20, 2008 primary election, and was also victorious in the Republican primary as a write-in. Under state law he was compelled to choose one party's representation, selecting to run as a Democrat. No Republican candidate filed for the race, and he won in the November general election. He was sworn into office on January 5, 2009, becoming the 16th Attorney General for the state.

In October 2011, Kroger announced he would not seek another term, citing an unspecified illness. In April 2012, he announced that he would be resigning from office to become president of Reed College, and later set the effective date as June 29.

2008 Oregon Attorney General Election
Party	Candidate	Votes	%
Democratic	John Kroger	1,096,507	72.57
Constitution	James Leuenberger	168,866	11.18
Pacific Green	Walt Brown	76,856	5.09
Working Families	J. Ashlee Albies	161,655	10.70
	write-ins	7,047	0.47
Total votes		1,510,931	100
Democratic hold			

== Return to academia ==
After leaving public service, Kroger returned to academia by becoming president of Reed College on June 30, 2012.

In February 2018, Kroger announced he would be stepping down as Reed College president in the summer of 2018. On June 30, 2018, Kroger was replaced at Reed College by vice president Hugh Porter, serving as acting president until a permanent replacement was found.

After leaving Reed, Kroger became the Hauser Leader-in-Residence at the Center for Public Leadership in the Harvard Kennedy School for the 2018–2019 academic year. For the Fall 2018 semester, Kroger taught a criminal procedure and investigation course at the Harvard Law School.

In October 2019, Kroger became the inaugural Chief Learning Officer for the US Navy, overseeing the US Naval Academy, the Naval Postgraduate School, the Naval War College, the Marine Corps University, and a soon to be established Naval Community College. Kroger left his job with the Navy to join the Aspen Institute in July 2020.

== Bibliography ==
- Kroger, John (May 2008). Convictions: A Prosecutor's Battles Against Mafia Killers, Drug Kingpins, and Enron Thieves. Farrar, Straus and Giroux. ISBN 0-374-10015-2. OCLC 180752029.

Legal offices
Preceded by Hardy Myers	16th Oregon Attorney General; 2009 – 2012	Succeeded by Ellen Rosenblum
Academic offices
Preceded by Colin Diver	15th President of Reed College; 2012 – 2018	Succeeded by Audrey Bilger
