= Greg Macpherson =

American politician (born 1950)

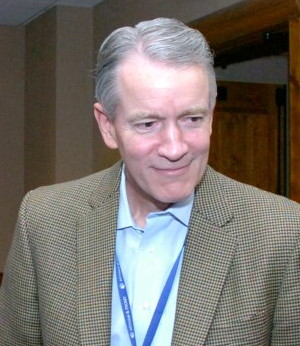

Member of the Oregon House of Representatives from the 38th district
- In office 2003–2009
- Preceded by: Richard Devlin
- Succeeded by: Chris Garrett

Personal details
- Born: May 3, 1950 (age 76) Corvallis, Oregon
- Party: Democratic
- Spouse: Tory Macpherson
- Occupation: Attorney

Gregory Hector Macpherson (born May 3, 1950) is a Democratic politician in the US state of Oregon. From 2003 to 2009, he served as the state representative from District 38, which includes most of Lake Oswego and portions of southwestern Portland.

== Early life ==
Macpherson was born in Corvallis, Oregon, and grew up in rural Linn County. His paternal grandfather, Hector Macpherson, Sr., was elected in 1926, 1928, and 1938 as a progressive Republican member the Oregon Legislative Assembly. During his political career his grandfather helped found the Oregon Department of Education. His father, Hector Jr., served in the Oregon State Senate and was a cosponsor of the 1973 law that established Oregon's land-use planning system.

Macpherson earned his undergraduate degree from Harvard University in 1972 and his law degree from Georgetown University in 1975. He was admitted to the Oregon bar in 1975. After 41 years, he retired in 2016 as a partner at Stoel Rives LLP in Portland.

== Political career ==
In 2002, Macpherson was elected to the Oregon House of Representatives, defeating Republican Jim Zupancic. He was re-elected in 2004 and 2006. In the Oregon House, he played a prominent role opposing Measure 37, a controversial ballot initiative that invalidated much of Oregon's land use regulation. He was the plaintiff in Macpherson v. Department of Administrative Services, an unsuccessful challenge to Measure 37's constitutionality. As chair of the House Judiciary Committee, he was instrumental in writing Measure 49, a 2007 ballot measure that scaled back some of Measure 37's provisions.

In 2006, Macpherson was one of only three Democrats in the Oregon legislature who urged the PUC to oppose refunding Portland General Electric (PGE) customers who had been illegally overcharged by the utility.

He was a candidate for Oregon Attorney General in 2008, running to succeed incumbent Hardy Myers, but lost in the Democratic primary to John Kroger. In 2012, Macpherson announced that he would run for mayor of his hometown of Lake Oswego.

== Personal ==
Macpherson and his wife Tory live in Lake Oswego. He has two adult children.

== Electoral history ==
2004 Oregon State Representative, 38th district
Party	Candidate	Votes	%
Democratic	Greg Macpherson	25,014	85.6
Libertarian	Christopher Richter	2,384	8.2
Constitution	Ernest C. Richardson	1,465	5.0
Write-in		357	1.2
Total votes		29,220	100%

2006 Oregon State Representative, 38th district
Party	Candidate	Votes	%
Democratic	Greg Macpherson	18,361	68.7
Republican	Fred Bremner	8,335	31.2
Write-in		45	0.2
Total votes		26,741	100%
