= Richard Devlin (politician) =

American politician

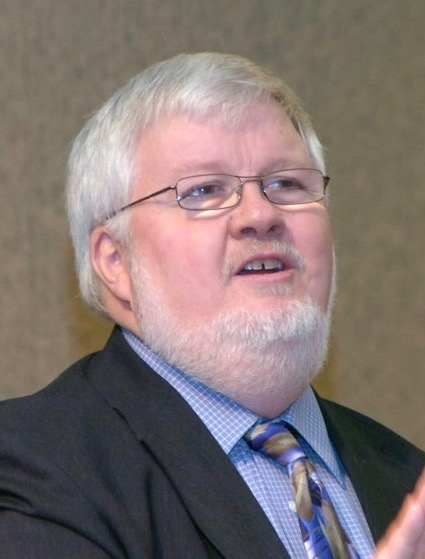
- Devlin in 2009

Member of the Oregon State Senate from the 19th district
- In office January 2003 – January 16, 2018
- Preceded by: Randy Miller
- Succeeded by: Rob Wagner

Member of the Oregon House of Representatives from the 38th district
- In office January 1997 – January 2003
- Preceded by: Bob Tiernan
- Succeeded by: Greg Macpherson

Personal details
- Born: September 9, 1952 (age 74) Eugene, Oregon
- Party: Democratic
- Spouse: Eliza Devlin
- Children: 2
- Education: Portland State University (BS); Pepperdine University (MA)

Richard Devlin (born September 9, 1952) is an American politician who served in the Oregon State Senate from 2003 to 2018, representing the 19th Senate district.

== Early life and education ==
Devlin was born in Eugene. He earned a Bachelor of Science degree in Administration of Justice from Portland State University in 1976 and a Master of Arts in Management from Pepperdine University in 1980.

== Career ==
He has worked in adult and juvenile corrections and as a civil and criminal investigator.

From 1985 to 1988, Devlin was a member of the Tualatin City Council. In 1988, he was elected to the Metro Council, serving on it until 1995. In 1994, Devlin won the Democratic nomination to the Oregon House of Representatives representing the 24th district, but lost in the general election to Republican Bob Tiernan. In 1996, Devlin again faced Tiernan, but this time, defeated him. Devlin was re-elected to the Oregon House in 1998 and 2000.

In 2002, Devlin ran for the Oregon State Senate to represent the 19th senate district; again, he faced Tiernan in the general election, and narrowly defeated him by a margin of 50% to 47%. He was re-elected to another 4-year term in 2006.

In the Senate, Devlin has served on the Joint Ways and Means Committee and has chaired the Ways and Means Subcommittee on Education and the Subcommittee on Natural Resources. He served as Senate Majority Leader from 2007 to 2010, succeeding Kate Brown, who successfully ran for Oregon Secretary of State.

Devlin was elected for a third term in 2010, defeating Republican Mary Kremer. In 2014, he was unopposed for re-election.

On October 23, 2017, Devlin was appointed by Governor Kate Brown to the Northwest Power and Conservation Council, which he accepted and began serving on January 16, 2018.

== Personal life ==
Devlin and his wife Eliza live in Tualatin, Oregon. They have two children.

== Electoral history ==
2006 Oregon State Senator, 19th district
Party	Candidate	Votes	%
Democratic	Richard Devlin	30,963	61.3
Republican	David Newell	18,299	36.2
Libertarian	Marc Delphine	1,218	2.4
Write-in		65	0.1
Total votes		50,545	100%

2010 Oregon State Senator, 19th district
Party	Candidate	Votes	%
Democratic	Richard Devlin	30,179	54.5
Republican	Mary Kremer	25,038	45.3
Write-in		112	0.2
Total votes		55,329	100%

2014 Oregon State Senator, 19th district
Party	Candidate	Votes	%
Democratic	Richard Devlin	39,529	96.0
Write-in		1,626	4.0
Total votes		41,155	100%
