= Allen Alley =

American businessman and politician

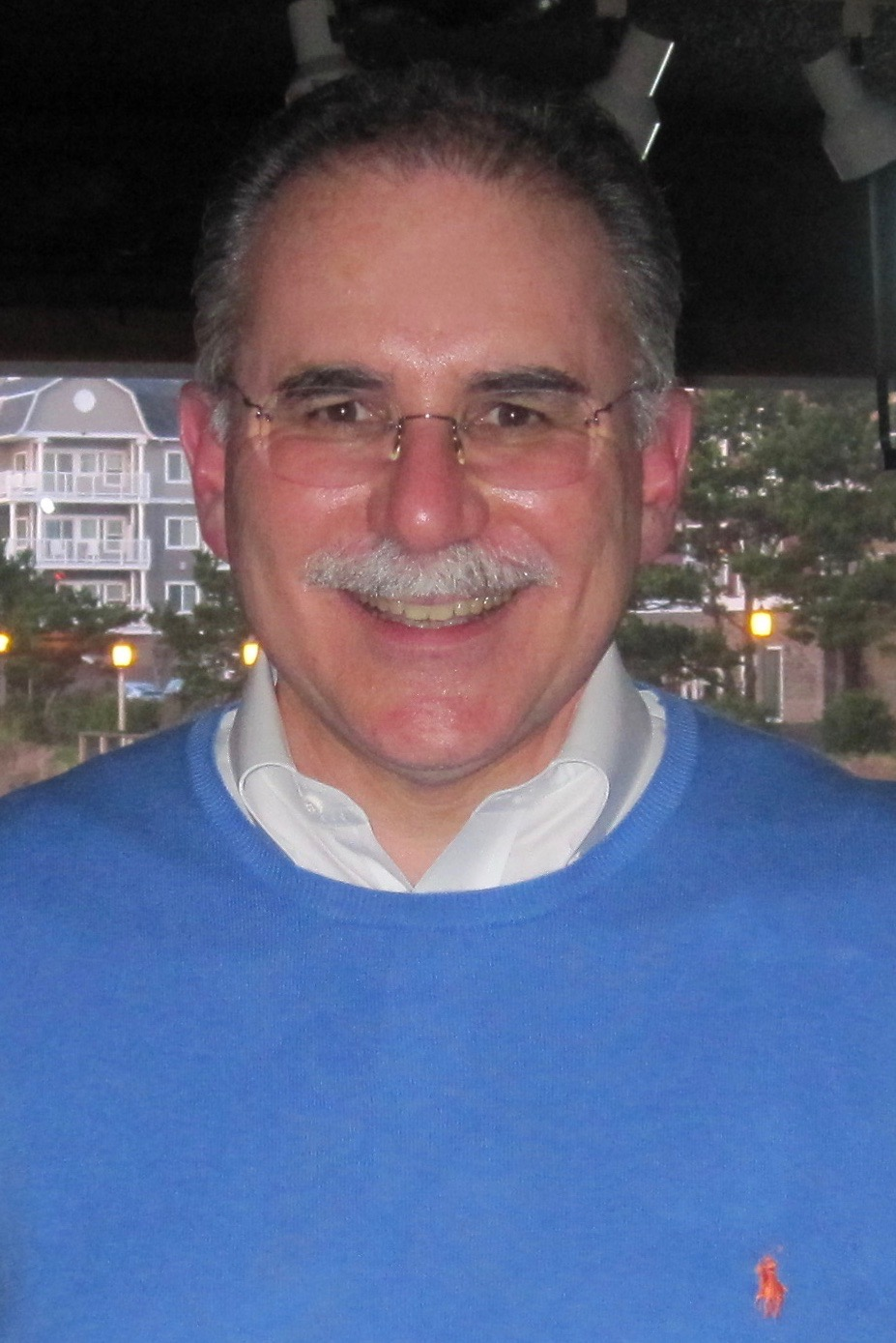

Chair of the Oregon Republican Party
- In office January 2011 – February 2013
- Preceded by: Bob Tiernan
- Succeeded by: Suzanne Gallagher

Personal details
- Born: August 3, 1954 (age 72) Kalamazoo, Michigan, U.S.
- Party: Republican
- Spouse: Debbie Alley
- Education: Purdue University (BS)

Allen Alley (born August 3, 1954) is an American businessman and politician from the State of Oregon. He sought the Republican nomination for Governor of Oregon in the 2016 Oregon gubernatorial special election, losing to Bud Pierce. Alley also sought the Republican nomination in 2010, but lost to Chris Dudley. Alley was the Republican nominee for Oregon State Treasurer in 2008 and also served as chairman of the Oregon Republican Party from January 2011 to February 2013.

== Early life and education ==
Alley was born in Kalamazoo, Michigan, United States, the son of Nafe and Behle Alley. His father, a mechanical engineer, began his career designing conveyor systems before joining the Boeing Company. The family lived in several different cities, including Seattle and Philadelphia where Allen attended Nether Providence High School.

In 1976, Alley graduated from Purdue University with a degree in mechanical engineering and a minor in business.

== Career ==
=== Business ===
He went to work for the Ford Motor Company and then Boeing in various product engineering and design roles. Alley joined Computervision as director of Product Marketing in Boston, Massachusetts. From there, he was recruited to join Battery Ventures, a $75 million investment company that specialized in high-technology ventures. In 1992, Alley moved to Oregon to work for InFocus, a manufacturer of mobile business display hardware, where he served as vice president of corporate development, engineering, and marketing. In 1997, Alley co-founded Pixelworks, a fabless semiconductor company.

In 2000, Alley raised $66.1 million for Pixelworks, making it one of that year's top capital raises for semiconductors.

=== Politics ===
In February 2002, Alley accepted a Presidential appointment from President George W. Bush to sit on the U.S.-Japan Private Sector/Government Commission, which strove to promote sustainable economic growth in both countries.

In 2006, Alley was named as the Chairman of the Oregon Business Plan, which is tasked with helping shape public policy to promote economic growth, create jobs, raise incomes and reduce poverty in Oregon.

After stepping down as CEO of Pixelworks Inc. in 2007, Alley was hired to serve as a deputy chief of staff for Democratic Oregon Governor Ted Kulongoski. Included in Alley's policy portfolio was economic development, technology, transportation, workforce training and energy.

==== Campaigns ====
In May 2008, Alley won the Republican primary for Oregon State Treasurer. Alley lost to Democratic state Senator Ben Westlund by 51% to 45% in the general election.

In 2009, Alley announced his candidacy for Governor of Oregon in 2010. He lost in the May 2010 Republican primary to wealth strategist and former NBA player Chris Dudley.

On January 3, 2011, Alley announced his candidacy for Oregon Republican Party Chairman. Alley gained support from numerous other Republican politicians and party leaders including U.S. Congressmen Greg Walden. Alley ran unopposed and on January 22, 2011, he was elected to the position.

On June 23, 2012, as Oregon GOP chairman, Alley directed that the Congressional District Convention be concluded at 5 p.m., which angered some supporters of the Ron Paul slate, who alleged that the adjournment was intended to prevent additional candidates from the slate from winning Alternate Delegate slots. On August 28, 2012, at the 2012 Republican National Convention, Alley reported the Oregon delegation's votes as 4 for Ron Paul, 1 for Rick Santorum, and 23 for Mitt Romney.

In November 2012, Alley announced he would not seek another term as chairman, citing business concerns. He was succeeded in February 2013 by Suzanne Gallagher.

In 2016, Alley ran for Governor of Oregon a second time. He finished second in the Republican primary, losing to Bud Pierce.

== Personal life ==
Alley married his wife Debbie in 1982 and they have three children. As of January 15, 2019, Allen and Debbie reside in Lake Oswego, Oregon.

== Electoral history ==
Oregon State Treasurer election, 2008
Party	Candidate	Votes	%
Democratic	Ben Westlund	847,590	51.1
Republican	Allen Alley	750,484	45.3
Constitution	Michael Marsh	56,581	3.4
Write-in		3,529	0.2
Total votes		1,658,184	100%

Oregon Republican gubernatorial primary results, 2010
Party	Candidate	Votes	%
Republican	Chris Dudley	122,855	39.11
Republican	Allen Alley	99,753	31.76
Republican	John Lim	47,339	15.07
Republican	Bill Sizemore	23,522	7.49
Republican	William Ames Curtright	12,497	3.98
Republican	Rex O. Watkins	3,060	0.97
Republican	Write-ins	2,001	0.64
Republican	Clark Colvin	1,206	0.38
Republican	Darren Karr	1,127	0.36
Republican	Bob Forthan	727	0.23
Total votes		314,087	100.00

2016 Republican primary results by county. Red indicates a win by Pierce, yellow a win by Alley.

Oregon gubernatorial special election, 2016 Republican primary
Party	Candidate	Votes	%
Republican	Bud Pierce	171,158	47.66
Republican	Allen Alley	103,388	28.79
Republican	Bruce Cuff	41,598	11.58
Republican	Bob Niemeyer	35,669	9.93
Republican	Bob Forthan	4,290	1.19
Republican	Write-ins	3,020	0.84
Total votes		359,123	100

Party political offices
Preceded by Bob Tiernan	Chair of the Oregon Republican Party; 2011–2013	Succeeded by Suzanne Gallagher
