= Paul Bragdon =

American college president (1927–2021)

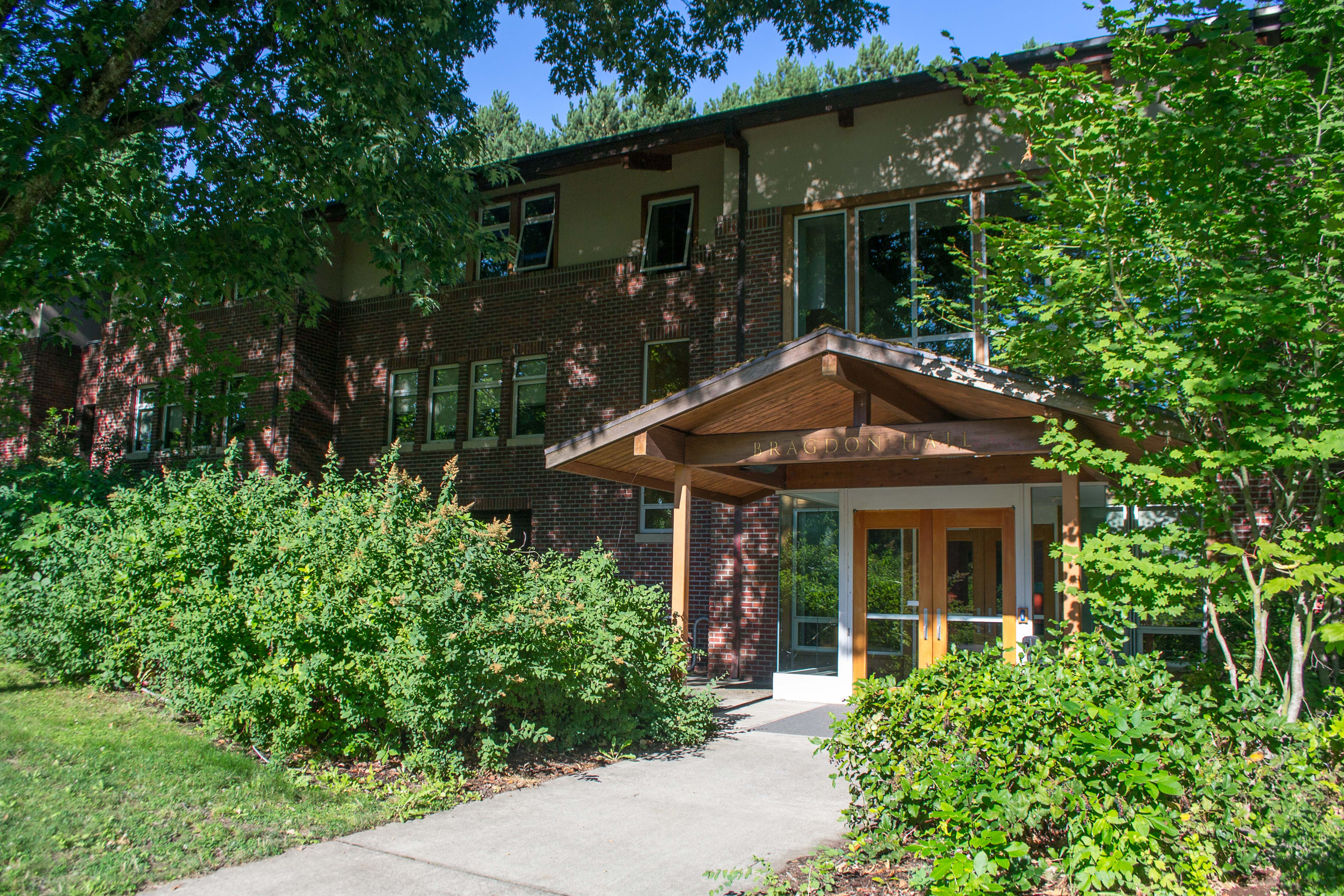
Bragdon Hall at Reed College was named after Paul Bragdon.

Paul Bragdon (April 19, 1927 – August 7, 2021) was Reed College’s longest serving President, from 1971 to 1988. One of the college's residence halls, Bragdon Hall, was named after him. After he retired from Reed, he became interim president of Lewis & Clark College from 2003 to 2004.

== Background ==
Bragdon was born in Portland, Maine. A Marine Corps vet, he graduated from Amherst College and Yale Law School. He received honorary degrees from Amherst College, Whitman College, Oregon Health & Sciences University, Pacific University, Lewis & Clark College, and Reed College.

== Career ==
Bragdon was named Reed College President in 1971, when he was a 43-year-old Senior Vice President at New York University.

Current Reed College President Audrey Bilger wrote, "Paul became president of Reed at an especially difficult moment in the college's history, with multiple challenges that led some to question Reed's viability. With Nancy by his side, Paul's caring and stalwart leadership allowed the Reed community to regain its strength and continue to offer its distinctive education in the liberal arts and sciences to the thousands of students who have chosen to enroll."

== Personal life ==
Bragdon married Nancy Ellen Horton and has two sons Peter and David and a daughter Susan. He died on August 7, 2021, at the age of 94.
